= List of art universities and colleges in Europe =

This is a list of fine art universities and colleges in Europe, containing academic institutions of higher (tertiary) undergraduate education, postgraduate education and research, offering academic degrees of fine art (such as Bachelor of Fine Arts, Master of Fine Arts, and equivalent). The list makes no distinction between public or private institutions, or by institutions that focus solely on fine art or as part of a wider range of related or non-related subjects. However, it does exclude 1) institutions below higher (tertiary) education, and 2) academic institutions that focus solely on arts in the definition of design, and applied arts, etc.

== Austria ==
- Academy of Fine Arts Vienna, Vienna, 1692 - website
- University of Art and Design Linz, Linz, 1947 - website
- University of Applied Arts Vienna, Vienna, 1867 - website

== Belgium ==
- Royal Academy of Fine Arts (Antwerp), Antwerp, 1663 - website
- Académie Royale des Beaux-Arts, Brussels, 1711
- Royal Academy of Fine Arts (Ghent), Ghent, 1741 - website
- LUCA School of Arts, Brussels, 1880
- Institut Saint-Luc, Brussels, 1882
- La Cambre, Brussels, 1926

== Bosnia and Herzegovina ==
- Academy of Performing Arts in Sarajevo, Sarajevo, 1981

== Bulgaria ==
- European Academy of Fine Arts, Sofia.2019 *National Academy of Art, Sofia, 1896

== Croatia ==
- Academy of Fine Arts, University of Zagreb, Zagreb, 1907

== Cyprus ==
- Cyprus College of Art, Larnaca, 1969

== Czech Republic ==
- Academy of Fine Arts, Prague, Prague, 1799 - website
- Academy of Arts, Architecture and Design in Prague, Prague, 1885 - website
- Prague City University, Prague, 2004 -
- Academy of Performing Arts in Prague, Prague, 1945- website
- Faculty of Fine Arts, Brno, 1993 - website
- Janáček Academy of Music and Performing Arts, Brno, 1947- website
- Ladislav Sutnar Faculty of Design and Art, University of West Bohemia, Plzeň, 2013 - website
- Faculty of Art and Design, Jan Evangelista Purkyně University in Ústí nad Labem, Ústí nad Labem, 2000 - website
- Faculty of Arts and Architecture, Technical University of Liberec, Liberec, 1994- website
- Prague School of Creative Communication, Prague, 2016 - website

== Denmark ==
- Royal Danish Academy of Fine Arts, Copenhagen, 1754
- Funen Art Academy, Odense, 1944
- Jutland Art Academy, Århus, 1959
- The Classical Drawing School, Glyptoteket

== Estonia ==
- Estonian Academy of Arts, Tallinn, 1914
- Tartu Art College, Karlova, 2000

== Finland ==
- University of the Arts Helsinki, Helsinki, 2013

== France ==
- École nationale supérieure des Beaux-Arts, Paris, 1682
- École nationale supérieure d'art de Nancy, Nancy, 1702
- Institut supérieur des arts de Toulouse, Toulouse, (1746?)
- ESAD de Reims, Reims, 1748
- École supérieure d'art et de design Marseille-Méditerranée, Marseille, 1752
- École supérieure des beaux-arts de Tours, Tours, 1760
- École supérieure d'art de Grenoble, Grenoble, 1762
- École supérieure d'art d'Aix-en-Provence, Aix-en-Provence, 1765
- École nationale supérieure d'art de Dijon, Dijon, 1765
- École nationale supérieure des arts décoratifs, Paris, 1766
- École nationale des beaux-arts de Lyon, Lyon, 1756
- École supérieure des beaux-arts de Montpellier Méditerranée Métropole, Montpellier, (1779?)
- École supérieure d'art et de design d'Orléans, Orléans, 1787
- École régionale des beaux-arts de Rennes, Rennes, 1795
- École supérieure d'art d'Avignon, Avignon, 1801
- Haute École des arts du Rhin, Strasbourg, (1821?)
- École nationale supérieure des arts appliqués et des métiers d'art, Paris, 1856
- Villa Arson, Nice, 1881
- École Boulle, Paris, 1886
- École des beaux-arts de Bordeaux, Bordeaux, 1889
- École supérieure des beaux-arts de Nantes Métropole, Nantes, 1904
- École nationale supérieure d'arts de Paris-Cergy (ENSAPC), 1975
- Paris College of Art, Paris, 1981 - PCA website
- Institut des Hautes Études en Arts Plastiques, Paris, 1985
- Pont Aven School of Contemporary Art, Pont-Aven, 1993 - permanently closed
- European Academy of Art in Brittany (European University of Brittany), Rennes, 2010
- Parsons Paris (2013) (Parsons School of Design), Paris, 2013- website
- Ecole Supérieure de Réalisation Audiovisuelle (ESRA Paris, Nice, Rennes), 1972 website

== Germany ==
- Academy of Fine Arts, Nuremberg, Nuremberg, 1662 - Akademie website
- Berlin University of the Arts, Berlin, 1696 - UDK website
- Burg Giebichenstein University of Art and Design, Halle (Saale), 1915 - University website
- State Academy of Fine Arts in Stuttgart, Stuttgart, 1761 - Akademie website
- Kunstakademie Düsseldorf, Düsseldorf, 1773 - Akademie website
- Dresden Academy of Fine Arts, Dresden, 1764
- Hochschule für Grafik und Buchkunst Leipzig, Leipzig, 1764
- University of Fine Arts of Hamburg, Hamburg, 1767
- Kunsthochschule Kassel, Kassel, 1777
- Academy of Fine Arts, Munich, Munich, 1808 - Akademie website
- Städelschule, Frankfurt, 1817
- Hochschule für Gestaltung Offenbach am Main, Offenbach am Main, 1832
- Academy of Fine Arts, Karlsruhe, Karlsruhe, 1854
- Bauhaus University, Weimar, Weimar, 1860
- University of the Arts Bremen, Bremen, 1873
- Weißensee Academy of Art Berlin, Berlin, 1946
- Braunschweig University of Art, Braunschweig, 1952

== Greece ==
- Athens School of Fine Arts, Athens, 1837
- Aristotle University of Thessaloniki, Thessaloniki, 1925

== Hungary ==
- Moholy-Nagy University of Art and Design, Budapest, 1870 - website
- Hungarian University of Fine Arts, Budapest, 1871 - website

== Iceland ==
- Iceland Academy of the Arts, Reykjavík, 1998

== Ireland ==
- National College of Art and Design, Dublin, 1746 - NCAD website
- Limerick School of Art and Design, Limerick, 1852 Limerick School of Art website
- Crawford College of Art and Design, Cork, 1974 - Crawford website
- Dublin Institute of Technology, Dublin, 1992 - School of Art, Design & Printing website
- Burren College of Art, Galway, 1993 - Burren College of Art website
- Dún Laoghaire Institute of Art, Design and Technology, Dublin, 1997

== Italy ==
=== State academies of fine art ===
- Accademia di Belle Arti di Firenze, Florence, 1563 - website
- Accademia di Belle Arti di Roma, Rome, latter part of the 16th century - website
- Accademia di Belle Arti di Torino "Albertina", Turin, 1678
- Accademia di Belle Arti di Venezia, Venice, 1750 - website
- Accademia di Belle Arti di Napoli, Naples, 1752 - website
- Accademia di Belle Arti di Milano "Brera", Milan, 1776 - website
- Accademia di Belle Arti di Carrara, Carrara, 1769
- Accademia di Belle Arti di Palermo, Palermo, 1780
- Accademia di Belle Arti di Bologna, Bologna, 1802 - website
- Accademia di Belle Arti di Lecce, Lecce, 1960
- Accademia di Belle Arti di Catania, Catania, 1967
- Accademia di Belle Arti di Reggio Calabria, Reggio Calabria, 1967
- Accademia di Belle Arti di Urbino, Urbino, 1967 - website
- Accademia di Belle Arti di L'Aquila, L'Aquila, 1969
- Accademia di Belle Arti di Bari, Bari, 1970
- Accademia di Belle Arti di Foggia, Foggia, 1970
- Accademia di Belle Arti di Catanzaro, Catanzaro, 1972
- Accademia di Belle Arti di Macerata, Macerata, 1972 - website
- Accademia di Belle Arti di Frosinone, Frosinone, 1973
- Accademia di Belle Arti di Sassari, Sassari, 1989

=== Other academies with state recognition ===
- Accademia di Belle Arti di Perugia, Perugia, 1573
- Accademia Ligustica di Belle Arti di Genova, Genoa, 1751
- Accademia di Belle Arti di Verona, Verona, 1764
- Accademia Carrara di Belle Arti di Bergamo, Bergamo, 1796
- Accademia di Belle Arti di Ravenna, Ravenna, 1827
- Accademia di Belle Arti "Lorenzo da Viterbo", Viterbo, 1975
- Accademia di belle arti Michelangelo, Agrigento, 1979
- Nuova Accademia di Belle Arti, Milan, 1980
- Accademia di Belle Arti Aldo Galli di Como, Como, 1989
- Accademia di Belle Arti di Cuneo, Cuneo, 1992
- Accademia di Belle Arti Rosario Gagliardi, Syracuse, 1995
- Accademia di Belle Arti di Sanremo, Sanremo, 1997
- Accademia di Belle Arti "Fidia" di Stefanaconi, Stefanaconi, 1997
- Accademia di Belle Arti "Rome University of Fine Arts" di Roma, Rome, 1998
- Libera Accademia di Belle Arti LABA di Brescia, Brescia, 1999
- Accademia di Belle Arti Kandinskij di Trapani, Trapani, 1999
- Accademia di Belle Arti SantaGiulia di Brescia, Brescia, 2002
- Accademia di Belle Arti Abadir di San Martino delle Scale, San Martino delle Scale
- Accademia di Belle Arti Abadir di Sant'Agata li Battiati, Sant'Agata li Battiati
- Accademia di Belle Arti Europea dei Media ACME di Milano, Milan
- Accademia di Belle Arti Europea dei Media ACME di Novara, Novara
- Accademia di Belle Arti I. Repin a Firenze, Florence

== Latvia ==
- Art Academy of Latvia, Riga, 1921

== Lithuania ==
- Vilnius Academy of Art, Vilnius, 1793

== Netherlands ==
- Royal Academy of Art, The Hague, The Hague, 1682 - KABK website
- Willem de Kooning Academy (including Piet Zwart Institute), Rotterdam, 1773 - Willem de Kooning website
- Academie Minerva, Groningen, 1798 - website
- AKV St.Joost, Breda, Den Bosch, 1812 - website
- Rijksakademie van beeldende kunsten, Amsterdam, 1870 - Rijksakademie website
- Fontys School of the Fine and Performing Arts, Tilburg, 1912 -
- Gerrit Rietveld Academie, Amsterdam, 1924 - Gerrit Rielveld Academie website
- Jan Van Eyck Academie, Maastricht, 1948 - Jan van Eyck Academie website
- Amsterdam University of the Arts, Amsterdam, 1987
- Maastricht Academy of Fine Arts, Maastricht, 1993
- Frank Mohr Institute, Groningen, 1996 - FMI website
- Artez, Arnhem, Enschede, and Zwolle, 2002 - ArtEZ website
- Utrecht School of the Arts, Utrecht, 1987 - HKU website

== Norway ==
- Bergen Academy of Art and Design, Bergen, 1972/1909
- Trondheim Academy of Fine Art, Trondheim, 1979
- Oslo National Academy of the Arts, Oslo, 1996
- Tromsø Academy of fine Art, Tromsø, 1997

== Poland ==
- Jan Matejko Academy of Fine Arts, Kraków, 1818 - website
- University of Fine Arts in Poznań, Poznań, 1919
- Academy of Fine Arts in Warsaw, Warsaw, 1932
- Academy of Fine Arts In Łódź, Łódź, 1945

== Portugal ==
- Colégio das Artes (University of Coimbra), Coimbra, (1542?)
- University of Porto, Porto, 1911 - website
- University of Lisbon, Lisbon, 1911 - website

== Romania ==
- George Enescu University of Arts of Iași, Iași, 1864
- Bucharest National University of Arts, Bucharest, 1948
- Art and Design University of Cluj-Napoca, Cluj-Napoca, 1925

== Serbia ==
- University of Arts in Belgrade § Faculty of Fine Arts, Belgrade, 1937
- University of Novi Sad § Academy of Arts, Novi Sad, 1974

== Slovakia ==
- Academy of Fine Arts and Design, Bratislava, Bratislava, 1949 VSVU website

== Slovenia ==
- Academy of Fine Arts and Design (University of Ljubljana), Ljubljana, (1919?)

== Spain ==
- Real Academia de Bellas Artes de San Fernando, Madrid, 1744
- Real Academia de Bellas Artes de San Carlos de Valencia, Valencia, 1768
- Reial Acadèmia Catalana de Belles Arts de Sant Jordi, Barcelona, 1775

== Sweden ==
- Royal Institute of Art, Stockholm, 1735 - http://www.kkh.se/en
- University College of Arts, Crafts and Design, Stockholm, 1844 - https://www.konstfack.se/en
- Valand Academy, Gothenburg, 1865 - http://akademinvaland.gu.se/english
- Malmö Art Academy, Malmö, 1965 - http://www.khm.lu.se/en
- Academy of Fine Arts, Umeå, Umeå, 1987 - http://www.art.umu.se/en

== Switzerland ==
- École cantonale d'art de Lausanne, Lausanne, 1821
- Zurich University of the Arts, Zurich, 1878/2007
- Bern Academy of Arts, Bern, 2003

== United Kingdom ==
=== England ===
- Norwich University of the Arts, Norwich, 1845 - Norwich University of the Arts website
- University for the Creative Arts, 2005 - Canterbury, Farnham, Epsom - UCA website
- Royal Academy of Arts, London, 1768 - Royal Academy website
- Royal College of Art, London, 1837 - RCA website
- Manchester School of Art, Manchester, 1838
- Leeds Arts University, Leeds 1846
- Hereford College of Arts, West Midlands, 1851
- Bath School of Art and Design, Bath, 1852
- Central Saint Martins (University of the Arts London), London, 1854 - St Martins College website
- City and Guilds of London Art School, London, 1854
- Arts University Plymouth, Plymouth, 1856
- Slade School of Art, London, 1871 - Slade website
- Ruskin School of Drawing and Fine Art (University of Oxford), Oxford, 1871
- Arts University Bournemouth, Poole, 1880 - The Arts Institute at Bournemouth website
- Wimbledon College of Art (University of the Arts London), London, 1890 - Wimbledon College website
- Goldsmiths College, London, 1891 - Goldsmiths website
- London College of Communication (University of the Arts London), London, 1894 - LCC website
- Camberwell College of Arts (University of the Arts London), London, 1898 - Camberwell College website
- Falmouth University, Falmouth, Cornwall, 1902
- University of Leeds, Leeds, 1904
- Chelsea College of Arts (University of the Arts London), London, 1908 - Chelsea College website
- Liverpool College of Art, Liverpool, 1910

=== Northern Ireland ===
- Belfast School of Art, Belfast, 1849

=== Scotland ===
- Edinburgh College of Art, Edinburgh, 1760 - ECA website
- Glasgow School of Art, Glasgow, 1845 - GSA website
- Gray's School of Art, Aberdeen, 1885
- Duncan of Jordanstone College of Art and Design, Dundee, 1888 - DJCAD website
- Leith School of Art, Edinburgh, 1987

=== Wales ===
- Cardiff School of Art & Design, Cardiff, 1865
- Royal Cambrian Academy of Art, Conwy, 1881

== See also ==
- Art school
- Art education
- List of art schools in Europe
