= List of academies of fine art in Italy =

This is a list of the tertiary-level schools or academies of fine art in Italy that are recognised by the Ministero dell'Istruzione, dell'Università e della Ricerca, the Italian ministry of higher education.

== Accademie di Belle Arti ==
The official Accademie di Belle Arti or academies of fine art which depend directly from the ministry are:

Name	Address	Website	Director
Accademia di Belle Arti di Bari	Via Re David 189/C, 70124 Bari	www.accademiabelleartiba.it	Giancarlo Chielli
Accademia di Belle Arti di Bologna	Via delle Belle Arti 54, 40126 Bologna	www.ababo.it	Enrico Fornaroli
Accademia di Belle Arti di Carrara	Via Roma 1, 54033 Carrara	www.accademiacarrara.it	Luciano Massari
Accademia di Belle Arti di Catania	Via del Bosco 34/A, 95125 Catania	www.accademiadicatania.it	Vincenzo Tromba
Accademia di Belle Arti di Catanzaro	Via Tommaso Campanella 182, 88100 Catanzaro	www.abacatanzaro.it	Vittorio Politano
Accademia di Belle Arti di Firenze	Via Ricasoli 66, 50122 Florence	www.accademia.firenze.it	Claudio Rocca
Accademia di Belle Arti di Foggia	Corso Garibaldi 35, 71100 Foggia	www.abafg.it	Francesco Arrivo
Accademia di Belle Arti di Frosinone	Via Marconi, 03100 Frosinone	www.accademiabellearti.fr.it	Loredana Rea
Accademia di Belle Arti dell'Aquila	Via Leonardo da Vinci Loc. Pettino, 67100 L'Aquila	www.abaq.it	Marco Brandizzi
Accademia di Belle Arti di Lecce	Via Libertini 3, 73100 Lecce	www.accademialecce.it	Andrea Rollo
Accademia di Belle Arti di Macerata	Via Berardi 6, 62100 Macerata	www.abamc.it	Rossella Ghezzi
Accademia di Belle Arti di Milano "Brera"	Via Brera 28, 20121 Milan	www.accademiadibrera.milano.it	Giovanni Iovane
Accademia di Belle Arti di Napoli	Via S.M. Costantinopoli 107/A, 80138 Naples	www.abana.it	Giuseppe Gaeta
Accademia di Belle Arti di Palermo	Via Papireto 18/20, 90134 Palermo	www.accademiadipalermo.it	Mario Zito
Accademia di Belle Arti di Reggio Calabria	Via XXV Luglio 10, 89121 Reggio Calabria	www.accademiabelleartirc.it	Maria Daniela Maisano
Accademia di Belle Arti di Roma	Via Ripetta 222, 00186 Rome	abaroma.it	Cecilia Casorati
Accademia di Belle Arti di Sassari	Via Duca degli Abruzzi 4, 07100 Sassari	www.accademiasironi.it	Antonio Bisaccia
Accademia di Belle Arti di Torino "Albertina"	Via Accademia Albertina 6, 10123 Turin	www.albertina.academy	Edoardo Di Mauro
Accademia di Belle Arti di Urbino	Via dei Maceri 2, 61029 Urbino	www.accademiadiurbino.it	Umberto Palestini
Accademia di Belle Arti di Venezia	Dorsoduro 423, 30123 Venezia	www.accademiavenezia.it	Giuseppe La Bruna

== Other recognised academies ==
Other academies which have ministerial recognition are:

Name	Address	Website	Director
Accademia di Belle Arti Legalmente Riconosciuta di Agrigento "Michelangelo"	Via F. Crispi 87, 92100 Agrigento	www.abama.it	Alfredo Prado
Accademia di Belle Arti Legalmente Riconosciuta di Bergamo "Carrara"	Piazza G. Carrara 82/D, 24121 Bergamo	www.accademiabellearti.bg.it	Alessandra Pioselli
Accademia di Belle Arti Legalmente Riconosciuta di Brescia "LABA" – Libera Accademia di Belle Arti"	Via Don G. Vender 66, 25128 Brescia	www.laba.edu	Roberto Dolzanelli
Accademia di Belle Arti Legalmente Riconosciuta di Brescia "Santagiulia"	Via N. Tommaseo 49, 25128 Brescia	www.accademiasantagiulia.it	Riccardo Romagnoli
Accademia di Belle Arti Legalmente Riconosciuta di Catania "Nike"	Via Valdisavoia 3, 95123 Catania	www.accademianike.it	Vincenzo Caruso
Accademia di Belle Arti Legalmente Riconosciuta di Como "Aldo Galli"	Via Francesco Petrarca 9, 22100 Como	www.accademiagalli.com	Clemente Tajana
Accademia di Belle Arti Legalmente Riconosciuta di Cuneo	Via Savigliano 8/B, 12100 Cuneo	www.accademiabellearticuneo.it	Alberto Lucchini
Accademia di Belle Arti Legalmente Riconosciuta di Genova "Accademia Ligustica"	Largo Pertini 4, 16121 Genoa	www.accademialigustica.it	Osvaldo Devoto
Accademia di Belle Arti Legalmente Riconosciuta di Milano "Acme"	Via Cagnola 17, 20154 Milan	www.acmemilano.it	Walter Bacchella
Accademia di Belle Arti Legalmente Riconosciuta di Milano "NABA – Nuova Accademia di Belle Arti"	Via Darwin 20, 20143 Milan	www.naba.it	Alberto Bonisoli
Accademia di Belle Arti Legalmente Riconosciuta di Novara "ACME"	Via C. Porta 25, 28100 Novara	www.acmenovara.it	Walter Bacchella
Accademia di Belle Arti Legalmente Riconosciuta di Perugia "Pietro Vannucci"	Piazza S. Francesco Al Prato 5, 06100 Perugia	www.abaperugia.org	Paolo Belardi
Accademia di Belle Arti Legalmente Riconosciuta di Ragusa "Mediterranea"	Viale Europa 377, 97100 Ragusa		Claudio Calabrese
Accademia di Belle Arti Legalmente Riconosciuta di Ravenna	Via delle Industrie 76, 48100 Ravenna	www.accademiabellearti.ra.it	Mauro Mazzali
Accademia di Belle Arti Legalmente Riconosciuta di Roma "Rome University of Fine Arts"	Via Benaco 2, 00199 Rome	www.unirufa.it	Fabio Mongelli
Accademia di Belle Arti Legalmente Riconosciuta di S. Agata li Battiati (Ct) "Abadir: Accademia di Belle Arti e Restauro"	Via G. Leopardi 8, 95030 Sant'Agata li Battiati	www.abadir.net	Lucia Giuliano
Accademia di Belle Arti Legalmente Riconosciuta di S. Martino Delle Scale "Abadir"	Abbazia Benedettina, Piazza Platani 10, 90040 San Martino delle Scale	www.abadir.it	Valentino Faraci
Accademia di Belle Arti Legalmente Riconosciuta di Sanremo "Istituto I. Duncan"	Corso Imperatrice 51, 18038 Sanremo	www.accademiabelleartisanremo.it	Pier Luigi Megassini
Accademia di Belle Arti Legalmente Riconosciuta di Siracusa "Rosario Gagliardi"	Via Cairoli, 20, 96100 Syracuse	www.madeprogram.it	Alessandro G. Montel
Accademia di Belle Arti Legalmente Riconosciuta di Stefanaconi – Vibo Valentia "Fidia"	C/Da Paieradi, Stefanaconi, Vibo Valentia	www.accademiafidia.it	Maria Concetta Greco
Accademia di Belle Arti Legalmente Riconosciuta di Trapani "Kandinskij"	Via C.A. Pepoli 159/161, 91100 Trapani	www.accademiadibelleartikandinskij.it	Silvia Guaiana
Accademia di Belle Arti Legalmente Riconosciuta di Verona "Cignaroli"	Via Carlo Montanari 5, 37122 Verona	www.accademiacignaroli.it	Massimiliano Valdinoci
Accademia di Belle Arti Legalmente Riconosciuta di Viterbo "Lorenzo da Viterbo"	Via Col Moschin 17, 01100 Viterbo	www.abav.it	Luigi Sepiacci

== See also ==
- List of art schools in Europe
