= List of art schools in Europe =

This is a list of art schools in Europe, containing art schools below higher (tertiary) undergraduate education. The list makes no distinction between public or private institutions, or by institutions that focus solely on fine art or as part of a wider range of related or non-related subjects. However, it does exclude (1) institutions of (tertiary) higher education (instead listed in List of art universities and colleges in Europe), and (2) institutions that focus solely on arts in the definition of design or applied arts, etc.

== Austria ==
- Academy of Fine Arts Vienna
- Anton Bruckner Private University, Linz
- Mozarteum University Salzburg
- University of Applied Arts Vienna
- University of Art and Design Linz
- University of Music and Performing Arts Graz
- University of Music and Performing Arts Vienna

== Azerbaijan ==
- Azerbaijan State Academy of Fine Arts
- Azerbaijan State University of Culture and Arts
- Azim Azimzade Azerbaijan State Art School
- House of Khurshidbanu Natavan

== Belgium ==
=== French community of Belgium ===
==== Brussels ====
- École nationale supérieure des arts visuels de La Cambre (ENSAV La Cambre)
- Académie royale des Beaux-Arts – École supérieure des Arts de la Ville de Bruxelles (ARBA-ESA)
- Instituts Saint-Luc de Bruxelles:
  - École supérieure des Arts Saint-Luc (ESA)
  - École de recherche graphique (Erg)
- Institut national supérieur des arts du spectacle et des techniques de diffusion (INSAS)
- École supérieure des Arts du Cirque (ESAC)
- Royal Conservatory of Brussels (CRB)
- École supérieure des Arts de l'image Le 75 (ESA Le 75)

==== Liège ====
- École supérieure des arts de la ville de Liège (ÉSAVL)
- Royal Conservatory of Liège (CRL)
- École supérieure des arts Saint-Luc de Liège

==== Louvain-la-Neuve ====
- Institut des arts de diffusion (IAD)

==== Mons ====
- Arts²

=== Flemish community of Belgium ===
- Erasmushogeschool Brussel (EhB):
  - Royal Institute of Theatre, Cinema and Sound (RITCS)
  - Royal Conservatory of Brussels (KCB)
- LUCA School of Arts:
  - Lemmensinstituut
- Hogeschool Gent (HoGent):
  - Royal Academy of Fine Arts of Ghent (KASK)

=== Private unrecognized institutions ===
- Institut Jaques-Dalcroze
- École supérieure de réalisation audiovisuelle
- Queen Elisabeth Music Chapel

== Estonia ==
- Estonian Academy of Arts (Eesti Kunstiakadeemia)

== Finland ==
- University of the Arts, Helsinki
- Free Art School, Helsinki
- Nordic Art School, Kokkola

== France ==
Art schools in France

- École nationale supérieure des Beaux-Arts de Paris (ENSBA)
- École supérieure d'art de Lorraine (ESAL)
- École nationale supérieure des arts décoratifs (ENSAD)
- École nationale supérieure d'arts de Paris-Cergy (ENSAPC)
- École nationale supérieure des beaux-arts de Lyon
- Haute école des arts du Rhin (HEAR)

=== Defunct ===
- Académie Julian, Paris (See also: List of faculty and alumni of the Académie Julian)
- Académie Colarossi
- Académie Ranson
- Écoles gratuites de dessin

== Georgia ==
- Tbilisi State Academy of Arts

== Greece ==
- Athens School of Fine Arts
- University of West Attica, Athens, School of Applied Arts and Culture
- Aristotle University of Thessaloniki, Faculty of Fine Arts
- Aegean Center for the Fine Arts, Paros Fine Arts School
- Arts and Arts Sciences, University of Ioannina
- School of Fine Arts Tinos, Marble Workshop
- Hellenic Open University, Patras School of Applied Arts
- Ionian University of Corfu, Department of Audio-Visual Arts
- Dept of Wood & Furniture Design and Technology, Karditsa TEI of Thessaly
- University of the Aegean, Syros, Department of product and systems design

== Hungary ==
- Faculty of Music and Visual Arts, Pécs
- Hungarian University of Fine Arts
- Moholy-Nagy University of Art and Design Budapest
- Budapest Metropolitan University

== Ireland ==
- Burren College of Art, Galway
- Crawford College of Art and Design, Cork
- Dublin Institute of Technology
- Dún Laoghaire Institute of Art, Design and Technology
- Galway-Mayo Institute of Technology, Department of Art and Design/Film and Television, Galway
- Limerick School of Art and Design
- National College of Art and Design, Dublin
- Waterford Institute of Technology, Department of Art, Waterford

== Italy ==
- Accademia di belle arti Michelangelo, Agrigento (1979)
- Accademia di Belle Arti di Bari, Bari (1970)
- Accademia Carrara di Belle Arti di Bergamo, Bergamo (1796)
- Accademia di Belle Arti di Bologna, Bologna (1802)
- Free University of Bozen-Bolzano, Bolzano (1997)
- Libera Accademia di Belle Arti LABA di Brescia, Brescia (1999)
- Accademia di Belle Arti SantaGiulia di Brescia, Brescia (2002)
- Accademia di Belle Arti di Carrara, Carrara (1769)
- Accademia di Belle Arti di Catania, Catania (1967)
- Accademia di Belle Arti di Catanzaro, Catanzaro (1972)
- Accademia di Belle Arti Aldo Galli di Como, Como (1989)
- Accademia di Belle Arti di Cuneo, Cuneo (1992)
- Istituto Superiore per le Industrie Artistiche ISIA Faenza, Faenza (1980)
- Accademia di Belle Arti di Firenze, Florence (1563)
- Florence Classical Arts Academy, Florence (2009)
- Istituto Europeo di Design, Florence
- Istituto Superiore per le Industrie Artistiche ISIA Firenze, Florence (1975)
- Accademia Italiana, Florence – Rome
- Florence Art Studio, Florence
- Accademia di Belle Arti di Foggia, Foggia (1970)
- Accademia di Belle Arti di San Pietroburgo a Firenze, Florence (2017)
- Accademia di Belle Arti di Frosinone, Frosinone (1973)
- Accademia Ligustica di Belle Arti di Genova, Genoa (1751)
- Accademia di Belle Arti di L'Aquila, L'Aquila (1969)
- Accademia di Belle Arti di Lecce, Lecce (1960)
- Accademia di Belle Arti di Macerata, Macerata (1972)
- Accademia di Belle Arti di Milano "Brera", Milan (1776)
- Nuova Accademia di Belle Arti, Milan (1980)
- Accademia di Belle Arti Europea dei Media ACME di Milano, Milan
- Istituto Europeo di Design, Milan
- Scuola Politecnica di Design, Milan (1954)
- Domus Academy, Milan (1982)
- Accademia di Belle Arti di Napoli, Naples (1752)
- Accademia di Belle Arti Europea dei Media ACME di Novara, Novara
- Accademia di Belle Arti di Palermo, Palermo (1780)
- Accademia di Belle Arti di Perugia, Perugia (1573)
- Accademia di Belle Arti di Ravenna, Ravenna (1827)
- Accademia di Belle Arti di Reggio Calabria, Reggio Calabria (1967)
- Accademia di Belle Arti di Roma, Rome (latter part of the 16th century)
- Accademia di Belle Arti "Rome University of Fine Arts" di Roma, Rome (1998)
- Istituto Superiore per le Industrie Artistiche ISIA Roma, Rome (1962)
- Accademia di Belle Arti Abadir di San Martino delle Scale, San Martino delle Scale
- Accademia di Belle Arti di Sanremo, Sanremo (1997)
- Accademia di Belle Arti Abadir di Sant'Agata li Battiati, Sant'Agata li Battiati
- Accademia di Belle Arti di Sassari, Sassari (1989)
- Accademia di Belle Arti "Fidia" di Stefanaconi, Stefanaconi (1997)
- Accademia di Belle Arti Rosario Gagliardi, Syracuse (1995)
- Accademia di Belle Arti Kandinskij di Trapani, Trapani (1999)
- Accademia di Belle Arti di Torino "Albertina", Turin (1678)
- Istituto d'Arte Applicata e Design IAAD, Turin (1978)
- Accademia di Belle Arti di Urbino, Urbino (1967)
- Istituto Superiore per le Industrie Artistiche ISIA Urbino, Urbino (1974)
- Accademia di Belle Arti di Venezia, Venice (1750)
- Università Iuav di Venezia, Venice – Treviso (1926)
- Accademia di Belle Arti di Verona, Verona (1764)
- Accademia di Belle Arti "Lorenzo da Viterbo", Viterbo (1975)

== Latvia ==
- Art Academy of Latvia, Riga
- Jānis Rozentāls Art High School, Riga
- Liepājas Art Highschool
- Mara Muizniece Riga School of Art, Riga
- Pardaugava Music and Art School, Riga
- Riga Design and Art school, Riga
- Riga School of Arts and Crafts, Riga
- Valka Art school (also provides primary art education to Estonian schoolchildren from Valga)
- Valmiera Design and Art school, Valmiera
- Rezekne Art and Design school, Rezekne

== Lithuania ==
- Jonava Janina Miščiukaitė School of Art, Jonava
- National M. K. Čiurlionis School of Art, Vilnius
- Vilnius Academy of Art

== Netherlands ==
- Academie Minerva, Groningen
- AKI Academy for Art & Design, Enschede; part of ArtEZ University of Arts
- AKV St. Joost, 's-Hertogenbosch and Breda
- Amsterdam University of the Arts
- ArtEZ University of Arts, Arnhem en Zwolle
- Christelijke Kunstacademie Zwolle, Zwolle
- Design Academy Eindhoven
- Fontys Academie voor Beeldende Vorming, Tilburg
- Gerrit Rietveld Academie, Amsterdam
- Interdisciplinary Arts Maastricht (iArts), Maastricht
- Jan Van Eyck Academie, Maastricht
- Maastricht Academy of Fine Arts
- Rijksakademie van beeldende kunsten, Amsterdam
- Royal Academy of Art, The Hague
- Utrecht School of the Arts
- Willem de Kooning Academy (WDKA), Rotterdam

== Norway ==
- Tromsø Academy of Contemporary Art, Tromsø
- Oslo National Academy of the Arts, Oslo
- Fakultet for kunst, musikk og design, UiB, Bergen
- Kunstakademiet, Trondheim
- Einar Granum Kunstfagskole, Oslo
- Strykejernet, Oslo
- Designinstituttet, Oslo
- Prosjektskolen art school, Oslo

== Poland ==
- Academy of Arts, Warsaw
- Academy of Fine Arts Eugeniusza Gepperta, Wrocław
- Academy of Fine Arts in Gdańsk
- Academy of Fine Arts in Katowice
- University of Fine Arts in Poznań
- Academy of Fine Arts in Warsaw
- Jan Matejko Academy of Fine Arts, Kraków
- Academy of Fine Arts In Łódź
- Academy of Music in Kraków
- Aleksander Zelwerowicz National Academy of Dramatic Art in Warsaw
- Fryderyk Chopin University of Music, Warsaw
- AST National Academy of Theatre Arts in Kraków, Kraków
- National Film School in Łódź

Arts faculties of other universities in Poland:

- Art Department at the Maria Curie-Skłodowska University in Lublin
- Art Department of Silesian University in Cieszyn
- Art Department, University of Zielona Góra
- Faculty of Arts, Pedagogical University of Kraków
- Faculty of Arts, University of Rzeszów
- Faculty of Arts, Kazimierz Pułaski University of Technology and Humanities in Radom
- Faculty of Fine Arts, Nicolaus Copernicus University in Toruń
- Faculty of Pedagogy and Art, Adam Mickiewicz University in Kalisz
- Faculty of Arts, University of Warmia and Mazury in Olsztyn
- Faculty of Pedagogy and Art, Jan Kochanowski University in Kielce

Private universities:

- European Academy of Arts in Warsaw
- Polish–Japanese Institute of Information Technology, Faculty of New Media Arts in Warsaw and Gdańsk and design course in Bytom

Art schools:

- Kraków Schools of Art and Fashion Design in Kraków

== Portugal ==
- Escola Superior de Tecnologia e Gestão, Instituto Politécnico de Portalegre, Portalegre
- Escola Secundária Artística António Arroio, Lisboa
- Escola Superior de Música de Lisboa, Instituto Politécnico de Lisboa, Lisboa
- Departamento de Comunicação e Arte, Universidade de Aveiro, Aveiro
- VICARTE, Research Unit "Glass and Ceramic for the Arts", Master of Glass Art and Science, Faculdade de Ciências e Tecnologia da Universidade Nova de Lisboa
- Departamento de Artes Visuais / Escola das Artes / Universidade de Évora, Évora
- ESAD Matosinhos – Escola Superior de Artes e Design, Matosinhos, Porto
- ESAP – Escola Superior Artística do Porto, Porto
- ESAD.CR – Escola Superior de Artes e Design, Caldas da Rainha
- IADE – Instituto de Artes Visuais, Design e Marketing, Lisboa
- Escola Superior Artística do Porto, Porto
- FBAUP, Faculdade de Belas Artes da Universidade do Porto, Porto
- FBAUL, Faculdade de Belas Artes da Universidade de Lisboa, Lisboa
- ESART. Escola Superior de Artes Aplicadas de Castelo Branco
- Colégio das Artes, Universidade de Coimbra, Coimbra

== Romania ==
- George Enescu National University of Arts, Iași
- West University of Timișoara, Facultatea de Arte si Design, Timişoara
- Art and Design University of Cluj-Napoca
- Bucharest National University of Arts
- University of Oradea, Facultatea de Arte vizuale, Oradea

== Russia ==
- Stroganov Moscow State Academy of Arts and Industry, Moscow
- Moscow Surikov State Academic Institute of Fine Arts
- Russian Academy of Painting, Sculpture and Architecture, Moscow
- Saint Petersburg Repin Academy of Arts, St.Petersburg (former Imperial)
- Saint Petersburg Art and Industry Academy (Stieglitz's), St.Petersburg
- Moscow State University of Printing Arts, Moscow
- College of Printing Arts, Moscow
- MArchI, Moscow
- British Higher School of Art and Design, Moscow

Former:

- Imperial Academy of Arts, St. Petersburg
- Moscow School of Painting, Sculpture and Architecture

== Serbia ==
- University of Arts in Belgrade, Belgrade
- Faculty of Fine Arts, Belgrade
- Faculty of Applied Arts, Belgrade
- Academy of Arts, University of Novi Sad, Novi Sad
- Academy of Classical Painting, Educons University, Sremska Kamenica
- School of Applied Arts, Šabac
- College of Fine and Applied Arts, Belgrade

== Slovakia ==
- Academy of Arts in Banská Bystrica
- Academy of Fine Arts and Design, Bratislava (VSVU – abbreviation in Slovak), Bratislava
- Academy of Performing Arts in Bratislava (VSMU), Bratislava
- School of Applied Arts Josefa Vydru (SUV), Bratislava

== Spain ==
- ANIMUM Creativity Advanced School, Málaga.
- AULA CM, School of Marketing and Communication. Madrid
- Barcelona Academy of Art (BAA. -abbrev. in Spanish Lang), Barcelona
- Barcelona Atelier of Realist Art (BARA. -abbrev. in Spanish Lang), Barcelona
- Escola d'Art i Superior de Disseny d'Alacant (EASD.A – abbrev. in Spanish lang.), Alicante
- Escuela Superior de Arte del Principado de Asturias (ESAPA – abbrev. in Spanish lang.), Asturias
- Escola d'Art i Superior de Disseny Pau Gargallo (EASD – abbrev. in Spanish lang.), Badalona, Barcelona
- Escola Massana, Centre d'Art i Disseny, Barcelona
- Elisava, Escola Superior de Disseny, Barcelona
- Esdi, Escola Superior de Disseny, Sabadell, Barcelona
- Eina, Escola de Disseny i Art, Barcelona
- Davinci Escola d'Art, Barcelona
- Estudio Nómada, Barcelona
- Istituto Europeo di Design (IED), Barcelona
- FDModa, Escuela Superior de Diseño y Moda Felicidad Duce, Barcelona
- IDEP, Escuela Superior Universitaria de imagen y diseño, Barcelona
- Metàfora, International Workshop, Barcelona
- Davinci Escola d'Art, Barcelona
- Barcelona Academy of Art (BAA), Barcelona
- EASD de Vic, Vic (Barcelona)
- UCLM Universidad de Castilla-La Mancha, Cuenca
- Escola d'Art i Superior de Disseny d'Olot, Girona
- Escuela de Arte Granada, Granada
- Escuela de Arte número diez, Madrid
- E/S/D MADRID, Escuela Superior del Diseño
- UCM Universidad Complutense de Madrid, Madrid
- Escuela Trazos, Madrid
- CICE, Escuela Profesional de Nuevas Tecnologias, Madrid
- ESNE, School Of Design, Madrid
- Instituto Superior de Arte, Madrid
- Real Escuela Superior de Dramatico, Madrid
- Istituto Europeo di Design (IED), Madrid
- ESDIP, Escuela Superior de Dibujo Profesional, Madrid
- Escuela Superior de Artes y Espectáculos, TAI, Madrid
- Academia del Lusso, Madrid
- Escuela de Arte Collado Mediano (EACM), Madrid
- Escuela de Arte de Murcia, Murcia
- Escola de Arte e Superior de Deseño Antonio Failde, Ourense
- Escola de Arte e Superior de Deseño Mestre Mateo, Santiago de Compostela
- Escuela de Artes de Zaragoza, Zaragoza
- PHotoEspaña International Centre Alcobendas PIC.A, Alcobendas-Madrid
- Creanavarra centro superior de diseño, Pamplona, Navarra
- Institute of the Arts Barcelona

== Sweden ==
- Idun Lovén Art School, Stockholm, 1920
- Swedish Academy of Realist Art, 2006
- Pernby School of Painting, Stockholm, 1929
- Gerlesborg School of Fine Art, Gerlesborg and Stockholm, 1944
- Konstfack, Stockholm, 1844
- Royal Institute of Art, Stockholm, 1735

== Switzerland ==
- École cantonale d'art de Lausanne
- Haute Ecole d'Art et Design de Genève (HEAD)
- Hochschule der Künste Bern (HKB)
- Institut Kunst Hochschule für Gestaltung und Kunst Basel (HGK)
- Zurich University of the Arts (ZHDK)
- F+F Schule für Kunst und Mediendesign Zürich (FFZH)
- Hochschule Luzern Kunst & Design
- Centre d'Enseignement Professionnel de Vevey (CEPV)
- École cantonale d'art du Valais (ECAV)

== Turkey ==
- Mimar Sinan Fine Arts University

== United Kingdom ==
=== England ===
- University for the Creative Arts
- Royal College of Art
- Chelsea College of Art
- Fine Arts College
- Heatherley School of Fine Art
- Manchester School of Art
- Open College of the Arts
- Putney School of Art and Design
- Royal Drawing School
- Slade School of Fine Art
- University of the Arts London
- School of Art, Architecture and Design (London Metropolitan University)
- Cambridge School of Art

=== Scotland ===
- Duncan of Jordanstone College of Art and Design, Dundee
- Edinburgh Atelier of Fine Art
- Edinburgh College of Art, University of Edinburgh
- Glasgow School of Art, Glasgow
- Gray's School of Art, The Robert Gordon University, Aberdeen
- Leith School of Art, Edinburgh

=== Wales ===
- Aberystwyth University School of Art
- Arts Academy Cardiff
- Cardiff School of Art & Design
- North Wales School of Art & Design, Wrexham
- Swansea College of Art

== See also ==
- Art school
- Art education
- List of art universities and colleges in Europe
