= List of art schools =

The following is a list of notable art schools.

== Accredited non-profit art and design colleges ==
- Adelaide Central School of Art
- Alberta University of the Arts
- Art Academy of Cincinnati
- Art Center College of Design
- The Art Institute of Boston
- The Art Institute of Pittsburgh
- Bauhaus University Weimar
- California College of the Arts
- California Institute of the Arts
- Camberwell College of Arts
- Cleveland Institute of Art
- College for Creative Studies
- Columbia College Chicago
- Columbus College of Art and Design
- Cooper Union
- Corcoran College of Art and Design
- Cornish College of the Arts
- École cantonale d'art de Lausanne
- Emily Carr University of Art and Design
- Fashion Institute of Technology
- Government College of Art and Craft
- Grekov Odessa Art school
- Kansas City Art Institute
- Kendall College of Art and Design
- Laguna College of Art and Design
- Lyme Academy College of Fine Arts
- Maine College of Art
- Maryland Institute College of Art
- Massachusetts College of Art and Design
- Memphis College of Art
- Milwaukee Institute of Art & Design
- Minneapolis College of Art and Design
- Montserrat College of Art
- Moore College of Art and Design
- National Art School (Sydney, NSW, Australia)
- New Hampshire Institute of Art
- Nova Scotia College of Art and Design University
- Ontario College of Art and Design University
- Oregon College of Art & Craft
- Otis College of Art and Design
- Pacific Northwest College of Art
- Paris College of Art
- Parsons The New School for Design
- Pratt Institute
- Rhode Island School of Design
- Ringling College of Art and Design
- San Francisco Art Institute
- Savannah College of Art and Design
- School of the Art Institute of Chicago
- School of the Museum of Fine Arts, Boston
- Vermont College of Fine Arts
- Watkins College of Art, Design & Film

== Other art schools ==
- Academy of Classical Design, North Carolina
- Art Academy of Cincinnati
- The Art Institute of Fort Lauderdale
- Art Students League of New York
- The Ashland Academy of Art
- Brooks Institute
- Burren College of Art
- California Academy of Studio Arts
- Capilano University
- College of Fine Arts, Bengaluru
- College of the Arts, Windhoek
- The Creative School, Toronto Metropolitan University
- Delaware College of Art and Design
- Digital Media Arts College
- Escola Nacional de Belas Artes
- European Academy of Art (EESAB)
- Famous Artists School
- Florida School of the Arts
- Haliburton School of the Arts
- Hong Kong Academy for Performing Arts
- Hussian College, School of Art
- Indonesian Institute of the Arts, Denpasar, Bali
- The Jerusalem Studio School
- Joe Kubert School of Cartoon and Graphic Art
- Lisbon School of Fine Arts
- Mississippi School of the Arts
- National Institute of Design
- New Brunswick College of Craft and Design
- New Hampshire Institute of Art
- New Image College of Fine Arts
- Northwest College of Art & Design
- Osaka University of Arts
- Paier College of Art
- Paris College of Art
- Pennsylvania Academy of the Fine Arts
- Pennsylvania Governor's School for the Arts
- Pierre Lassonde School of Fine Arts, Mount Allison University
- Rochester Institute of Technology
- Rocky Mountain College of Art and Design
- Royal College of Art
- School of Visual Arts
- Sessions College for Professional Design
- Sir Jamsetjee Jeejebhoy School of Art
- Srishti School of Art Design and Technology
- Sydney College of the Arts
- Tartu Art College
- University of Florida College of Fine Arts
- University of North Carolina School of the Arts
- Valand School of Fine Arts
- Victorian College of the Arts

== Academies of arts ==
- Academia de Artes (Mexico), an art institution founded in 1967/1968
- Academy of Art University (United States), a private school of art and design in San Francisco, California
- Academy of Arts (Egypt), a large educational complex in Cairo
- Academy of Arts and Academics (United States), a public high school dedicated to the arts, in Springfield, Oregon
- Bezalel Academy of Arts and Design (Israel), Israel's national college of art and design, located in Jerusalem; school of architecture, fashion, ceramics, fine arts, multimedia, founded in 1906
- Chengdu Art Academy (China), an art institution based in Chengdu, Sichuan, and founded in 1980
- China Academy of Art (China), an art school of mainland China, founded in 1928 by the government of the Republic of China
- Cranbrook Academy of Art (United States), a school of architecture and design, founded in 1932, in Bloomfield Hills, Michigan
- Estonian Academy of Arts (Estonia), a public arts school that offers education in arts at university level
- Iceland Academy of the Arts (Iceland), a public arts school that offers education in arts at university level
- Imperial Academy of Arts (Russia), a Russian art institution founded in 1757 which has played a variety of roles in the artistic life of Russia
- Iranian Academy of the Arts (Iran), an organization whose aim is the preservation and development of Iranian and local arts
- New York Academy of Art (United States), in New York City, boasts the only graduate program which focuses on the human figure
- Royal Academy of Arts (United Kingdom), an independent fine arts institution based in London
- Royal Swedish Academy of Arts (Sweden), an independent organization acting to promote painting, sculpting, building and the other visual arts
- Wulin Academy of Arts (China), an independent research institution and honorary society based in Hangzhou, dedicated to promoting studies of Chinese arts

== Academies of fine arts ==
- Académie des Beaux-Arts, Paris (France)
- Academy of Fine Arts and Design, Bratislava (Slovakia)
- Academy of Fine Arts and Design, Ljubljana (Slovenia)
- Academy of Fine Arts, Belgrade (Serbia)
- Academy of Fine Arts, Bologna (Italy)
- Academy of Fine Arts, Calcutta (India)
- Academy of Fine Arts, Florence (Italy)
- Academy of Fine Arts, Helsinki (Finland)
- Academy of Fine Arts, Karlsruhe (Germany)
- Academy of Fine Arts, Munich (Germany)
- Academy of Fine Arts, Nuremberg (Germany)
- Academy of Fine Arts, Prague (Czech Republic)
- Academy of Fine Arts, Umeå (Sweden)
- Academy of Fine Arts, Verona (Italy)
- Academy of Fine Arts, Vienna (Austria)
- Academy of Fine Arts, Zagreb (Croatia)
- Accademia di Belle Arti di Napoli (Italy)
- Accademia di Belle Arti di Perugia (Italy), founded in 1573, the second art academy of Europe
- Accademia di Belle Arti di Roma (Italy)
- Accademia di Belle Arti di Venezia Venice (Italy)
- AKV St. Joost, Breda (Netherlands)
- American Academy of Art, Chicago (United States)
- Bezalel Academy of Arts and Design, Jerusalem (Israel)
- Brera Academy, Milan (Italy)
- Central Academy of Fine Arts, Beijing (China)
- Chengdu Academy of Fine Arts, Chengdu (China)
- Gerrit Rietveld Academie, Amsterdam (Netherlands)
- Hong Kong Academy of Fine Arts (Hong Kong)
- Jan Matejko Academy of Fine Arts, Kraków (Poland)
- Jutland Art Academy, Aarhus (Denmark)
- Kunstakademie Düsseldorf, Düsseldorf (Germany)
- Libera Accademia di Belle Arti, Brescia (Italy)
- Maastricht Academy of Fine Arts, Maastricht (Netherlands)
- Nanyang Academy of Fine Arts (Singapore)
- New Orleans Academy of Fine Arts (United States)
- New York Academy of Art, New York City (United States)
- Nuova Accademia di Belle Arti, Milan (Italy)
- Pennsylvania Academy of the Fine Arts, Philadelphia (United States)
- Royal Academy of Art, The Hague (Netherlands)
- Royal Danish Academy of Fine Arts, Copenhagen (Denmark)
- Russian Academy of Arts, Moscow (Russia)
- Saint Petersburg Repin Academy of Fine Arts, Saint Petersburg (Russia)
- Utrecht School of the Arts, Utrecht (Netherlands)
- Willem de Kooning Academy, Rotterdam (Netherlands)

== Universities of the arts ==
Institutions called "university of the arts" and those with very similar names:

- Alberta University of the Arts, Calgary, Alberta, Canada
- Amsterdam University of the Arts
- Arts University Bournemouth
- Arts University Plymouth
- Baekseok Arts University
- Berlin University of the Arts
- Braunschweig University of Art
- Chugye University for the Arts
- Emily Carr University of Art and Design
- Falmouth University (formerly Falmouth College of Arts, an art, media and design school located in Penryn and Falmouth)
- Folkwang University of the Arts
- Full Sail University
- Iceland University of the Arts
- Karlsruhe University of Arts and Design
- Korea National University of Arts
- Kyoto City University of Arts (Kyoto-Geidai)
- Leeds Arts University
- Mimar Sinan Fine Arts University
- Nagoya University of Arts
- National Taiwan University of Arts
- Norwich University of the Arts
- Nova Scotia College of Art and Design University
- Ontario College of Art and Design University
- Osaka University of Arts
- Stockholm University of the Arts
- Tainan National University of the Arts
- Taipei National University of the Arts
- Tokyo University of the Arts (Tokyo-Geidai)
- University for the Creative Arts
- University of Art and Design Lausanne
- University of the Arts
- University of the Arts Bern
- University of the Arts Bremen
- University of the Arts Helsinki
- University of Arts in Belgrade
- University of the Arts London (federation of institutions)
- University of the Arts Singapore
- University of the Visual & Performing Arts
- Yewon Arts University
- Zurich University of the Arts

== Schools of the arts ==
The name of several schools (usually high schools) that are devoted to the fine arts, including:

- Baltimore School for the Arts
- Barbara Ingram School for the Arts
- Booker T. Washington High School for the Performing and Visual Arts
- Brooklyn High School of the Arts
- Cab Calloway School of the Arts
- Carver Center for Arts and Technology
- Charleston County School of the Arts
- Chattanooga High School Center for Creative Arts
- Children's Studio School
- Coronado School of the Arts
- Cracow School of Art and Fashion Design
- Denver School of the Arts (grades 6–12)
- Douglas Anderson School of the Arts
- Dreyfoos School of the Arts
- Duke Ellington School of the Arts
- Etobicoke School of the Arts
- Governor's School for the Arts
- Harding Fine Arts Academy
- Joshibi High School of Art and Design
- Las Vegas Academy
- Lois Cowles Harrison Center for the Visual and Performing Arts
- Los Angeles County High School for the Arts
- Malvern College Egypt
- Mississippi School of the Arts
- New World School of the Arts
- Northwest School of the Arts
- Oakland School for the Arts
- Orange County High School of the Arts
- Osceola County School for the Arts
- Perpich Center for Arts Education
- Pinellas County Center for the Arts
- Rochelle School of the Arts (PreK–8)
- Roosevelt School of the Arts
- San Francisco School of the Arts
- School of the Arts (Rochester, New York)
- South Carolina Governor's School for the Arts & Humanities
- Tacoma School of the Arts
- Vancouver School of Arts and Academics
- Victoria School of the Arts
- Walnut Hill School

== Similar school names ==
- AKI Academy for Art & Design
- The American Academy of Art
- Douglas Anderson School of the Arts
- Fiorello H. LaGuardia High School of Music & Art and Performing Arts
- Frank Sinatra School of the Arts
- High School of Art and Design
- High School of Graphic Communication Arts
- Idyllwild Arts Academy
- Interlochen Arts Academy
- Northcoast Preparatory and Performing Arts Academy
- Professional Performing Arts School
- San Diego School of Creative and Performing Arts

== University schools of the arts ==
Arts programs within a university may also be called a "school of the arts". Such programs include:

- Carnegie Mellon School of Art
- Columbia University School of the Arts
- Cornell University College of Architecture, Art, and Planning
- Faculty of Fine Arts of the University of Porto
- Lamar Dodd School of Art
- Mason Gross School of the Arts
- National Dong Hwa University College of the Arts
- Peck School of the Arts, University of Wisconsin–Milwaukee
- Skunder Boghossian College of Performing and Visual Arts

== Artist-initiated schools ==
Some art schools have been initiated by artists; these may be designed to operate as traditional schools, or may themselves be considered art projects.

- Black Mountain College (defunct)

== See also ==
- Art school
- Association of Independent Colleges of Art and Design
- Flint Institute of Arts
- Kunstgewerbeschule
- List of art schools in Europe
- List of art schools in Quebec
- National Association of Latino Arts and Culture
- National Association of Schools of Art and Design
