= Masciarelli =

Masciarelli is a surname. Notable people with the surname include:

- Andrea Masciarelli, Italian cyclist
- Francesco Masciarelli, Italian cyclist
- Livio Masciarelli, Italian sculptor
- Palmiro Masciarelli, Italian cyclist
- Renata Masciarelli, Mexican footballer
- Roberto Masciarelli, Italian volleyball player
- Simone Masciarelli, Italian cyclist
- Stefano Masciarelli, Italian actor
