= Elisabetta Di Prisco =

Italian politician (born 1950)

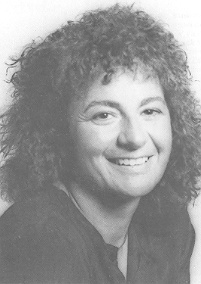

Member of the Chamber of Deputies
- In office 2 July 1987 – 14 April 1994

Personal details
- Born: 26 March 1950 (age 75); Verona, Italy
- Political party: Italian Communist Party; Democratic Party of the Left

Elisabetta Di Prisco (born 26 March 1950) is a former Italian politician. She was a member of the Chamber of Deputies for the Italian Communist Party and the Democratic Party of the Left between 1987 and 1994.

== Early life ==
Di Prisco was born on 26 March 1950 in Verona, Italy. She worked as a lecturer at the Academy of Fine Arts, Verona and as a scene painter. She served as the head of the women's committee and a member of the regional committee for the Italian Communist Party (PCI).

== Political career ==
She was elected to the Chamber of Deputies in the 1987 general election on 2 July 1987 as a representative for Verona-Padua-Vicenza-Rovigo. She served as a member on the committee for culture, science and teaching.

She was re-elected in the 1992 general election on 21 April 1992 as a member for the Democratic Party of the Left (PDS). She served as secretary of the Parliamentary Commission for the General Address and Supervision of the Radio and Television Services and as a member of the education commission. She left office on 14 April 1994.
