= LorenzoArs =

Italian artist

LorenzoArs (born Lorenzo di Giacomo), born in 1970 in Italy, is an Italian artist. His work has been shown in exhibitions in Italy and abroad.

== Biography ==
Lorenzo Di Giacomo was born in Abruzzo, Italy. He became active as an artist in the 1990s. He trained at the Academy of Fine Arts of Bologna and showed his work in local galleries. His work includes sculpture, video, photography and computer graphics. He also worked in advertising.
