= Bilmes =

Bilmes is a surname. Notable people with the surname include:

- Alex Bilmes (born 1973), British journalist
- Linda Bilmes (born 1960), American economist and academic
- Semyon Bilmes (born 1955), Azerbaijani-American painter
