= Aleksandra Gajewska (born 1971) =

Polish politician (born 1971)

Member of the Silesian Voivodeship Sejmik
- In office 28 November 2007 – 21 November 2014
- Constituency: No. 5

Personal details
- Born: 9 December 1971 (age 54) Czeladź, Poland
- Party: Civic Platform
- Education: Kraków Schools of Art and Fashion Design; University of Economics in Katowice
- Occupation: Politician; actress; director; writer

Aleksandra Joanna Gajewska-Przydryga (Polish: [a.lɛkˈsan.dra jɔˈan.na ɡaˈjɛf.ska pʂɘ̟ˈdrɘ̟.ɡa]; born 9 December 1971) is a Polish theatre director, and retired stage actress and politician. Since 2018, she has been a director of the Entertainment Theatre in Chorzów, where she previously performed as an actress. From 2007 to 2013, she was a member of the Silesian Voivodeship Sejmik, where, from 2010 to 2013, she served as its deputy marshal. She also wrote poems and children's books.

== Biography ==
Aleksandra Gajewska was born on 9 December 1971 in Czeladź, a town in Silesian Voivodeship, Poland. She graduated from the Kraków Schools of Art and Fashion Design, and from the University of Economics in Katowice with a degree in management. She was an actress in the Entertainment Theatre in Chorzów, and also occasionally performed at the New Theatre in Zabrze. Gajewska also wrote poems and children's literature. In 2010, she published a poetry book, titled Przez przypadki. Wiersze. She also wrote numerous short stories published in the children's magazine Miś.

In 2006, as a candidate of the Civic Platform, Gajewska unsuccessfully run of office to the Silesian Voivodeship Sejmik. She was appointed to the office on 28 November 2007, replacing Antoni Piechniczek, who was elected to the Senate of Poland. Gajewska was re-elected in 2010, and was appointed as the deputy marshal of the Sejmik in December 2010, holding the later office until January 2013, when she was replaced by Mirosław Sekuła. She resigned the same year. Afterwards, she was a member of several competition committees for cultural awards, and was also a board member of the program council of the Silesian Philharmonic.

In 2014, Gajewska was a director's representative at the Entertainment Theatre in Chorzów, working on public relations, marketing, and fund acquisition matters. She was also a lecturer at the Higher School of Occupational Health and Safety Management in Katowice. In 2018, Gajewska was appointed by the voivodeship government as a director of the Entertainment Theatre.

== Personal life ==
Gajewska has a daughter.

== Written works ==
Title	Publication date	Publisher	Notes	Ref.
Plamka i las pełen tajemnic	2005	Wydawnictwa Szkolne i Pedagogiczne	Short story; first published in the magazine Miś, no. 21 (2005), pp. 15–17	
Niezwykły sen	2006	Wydawnictwa Szkolne i Pedagogiczne	Short story; first published in the magazine Miś, no. 3 (2006), pp. 10–11	
Dziwne stworzenia	2006	Wydawnictwa Szkolne i Pedagogiczne	Short story; first published in the magazine Miś, no. 4 (2006), pp. 12–13	
Czy to już wiosna?	2006	Wydawnictwa Szkolne i Pedagogiczne	Short story; first published in the magazine Miś, no. 5 (2006), pp. 12–13	
Dzień dobry, już wiosna!	2006	Wydawnictwa Szkolne i Pedagogiczne	Short story; first published in the magazine Miś, no. 6 (2006), pp. 12–13	
Kwiecień – plecień	2006	Wydawnictwa Szkolne i Pedagogiczne	Short story; first published in the magazine Miś, no. 7 (2006), pp. 10–11	
Leśne pracusie	2006	Wydawnictwa Szkolne i Pedagogiczne	Short story; first published in the magazine Miś, no. 8 (2006), pp. 12–13	
Wielka majówka	2006	Wydawnictwa Szkolne i Pedagogiczne	Short story; first published in the magazine Miś, no. 8 (2006), pp. 12–13	
Mali ogrodnicy	2006	Wydawnictwa Szkolne i Pedagogiczne	Short story; first published in the magazine Miś, no. 10 (2006), pp. 10–11	
Przyjaciel	2006	Wydawnictwa Szkolne i Pedagogiczne	Short story; first published in the magazine Miś, no. 11 (2006), pp. 10–11	
Apetyt na jabłka	2006	Wydawnictwa Szkolne i Pedagogiczne	Short story; first published in the magazine Miś, no. 12 (2006), pp. 12–13	
Mały lotnik	2006	Wydawnictwa Szkolne i Pedagogiczne	Short story; first published in the magazine Miś, no. 13 (2006), pp. 12–13	
Niejadek	2006	Wydawnictwa Szkolne i Pedagogiczne	Short story; first published in the magazine Miś, no. 14 (2006), pp. 10–11	
Jak ryba w wodzie	2006	Wydawnictwa Szkolne i Pedagogiczne	Short story; first published in the magazine Miś, no. 15 (2006), pp. 10–11	
Żniwa	2006	Wydawnictwa Szkolne i Pedagogiczne	Short story; first published in the magazine Miś, no. 16 (2006), pp. 10–11	
Przeprowadzka	2006	Wydawnictwa Szkolne i Pedagogiczne	Short story; first published in the magazine Miś, no. 17 (2006), pp. 10–11	
Czerwone korale	2006	Wydawnictwa Szkolne i Pedagogiczne	Short story; first published in the magazine Miś, no. 18 (2006), pp. 10–11	
Zielone jeżyki	2006	Wydawnictwa Szkolne i Pedagogiczne	Short story; first published in the magazine Miś, no. 19 (2006), pp. 12–13	
Na grzyby!	2006	Wydawnictwa Szkolne i Pedagogiczne	Short story; first published in the magazine Miś, no. 20 (2006), pp. 10–11	
Pora na dobranoc	2006	Wydawnictwa Szkolne i Pedagogiczne	Short story; first published in the magazine Miś, no. 21 (2006), pp. 10–11	
Tajemniczy listek	2006	Wydawnictwa Szkolne i Pedagogiczne	Short story; first published in the magazine Miś, no. 21 (2006), pp. 16–17	
Zima za pasem	2006	Wydawnictwa Szkolne i Pedagogiczne	Short story; first published in the magazine Miś, no. 23 (2006), pp. 16–17	
Każdy chłopak...	2006	Wydawnictwa Szkolne i Pedagogiczne	Short story; first published in the magazine Miś, no. 23 (2006), pp. 16–17	
Zimowy niedźwiadek	2006	Wydawnictwa Szkolne i Pedagogiczne	Short story; first published in the magazine Miś, no. 24 (2006), pp. 16–17	
Przez przypadki. Wiersze	2010	Wydawnictwo Naukowe Śląsk	Poetry book	

== Electoral resutls ==
Electoral history of Aleksandra Gajewska
Year	Office		Party	Constituency	Votes			Result	Ref.
Year	Office		Party	Constituency	Total	%	P.	Result	Ref.
2006	Silesian Voivodeship Sejmik	3rd	Civic Platform	No. 5	2,987	1.86	12th	Lost (Note: Later appointed to the office in 2007, replacing Antoni Piechniczek.)	
2010	Silesian Voivodeship Sejmik	4th	Civic Platform	No. 5	7,068	4.14	3rd	Won	
