= National Observatory of Outsider Art =

Coordinates: 45°26′12″N 11°0′13″E

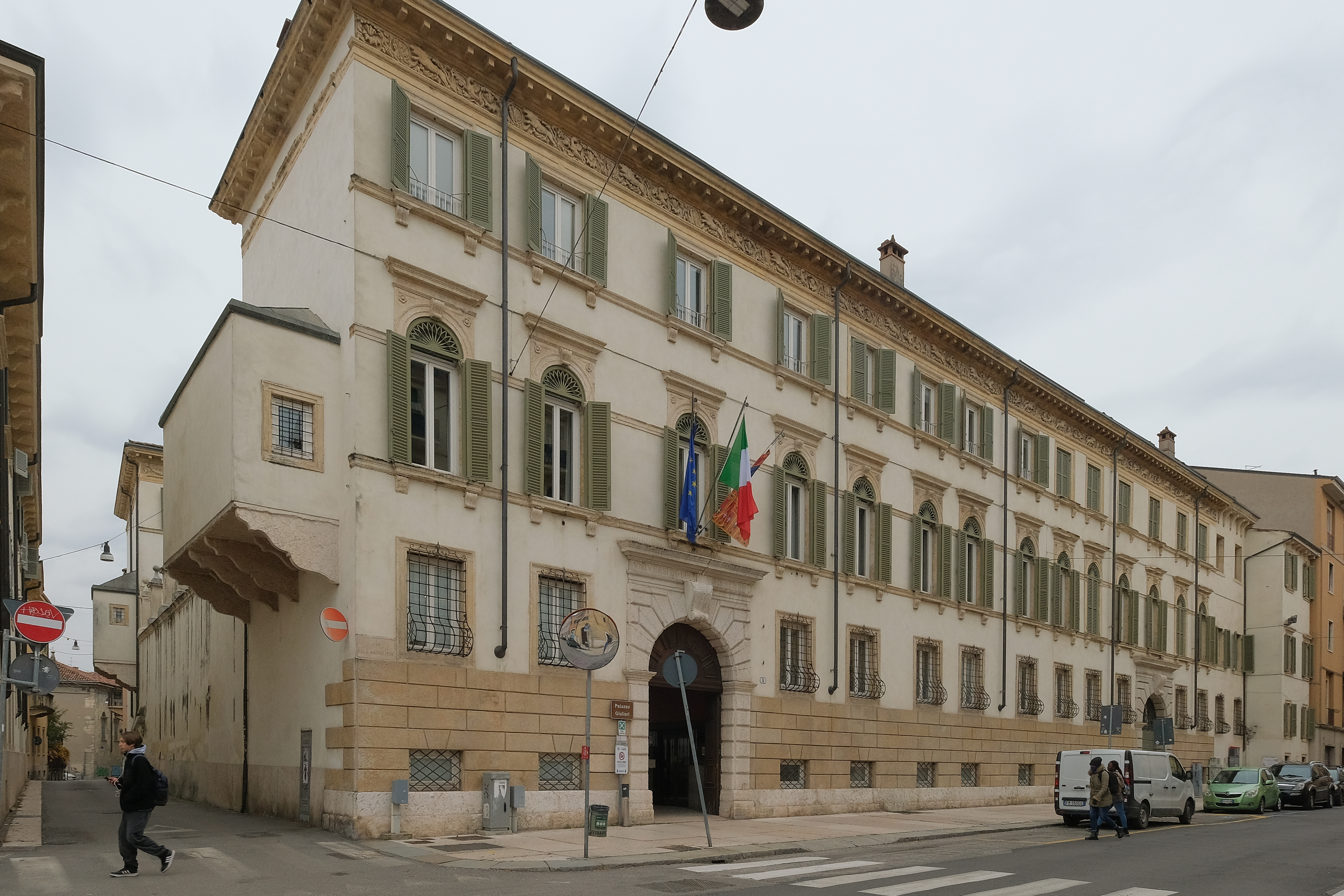
- Type: University
- Established: 2007
- Dean: Daniela Rosi
- Location: Verona, Italy, Europe
- Campus: Academy of Fine Arts of Verona
- Website: www.accademiacignaroli.it

The National Observatory of Outsider Art is a joint Department of the University of Verona, Faculty of Arts (Academy of Fine Arts, Verona). The Academy of Fine Arts of Verona (Italian name: Accademia di Belle Arti Gian Bettino Cignaroli di Verona) is a post-secondary school for studies in the visual arts, founded in 1764. One of the oldest Art Academy in the world, the Accademia Cignaroli is listed among the five Academie Storiche d'Italia (Italian Historic Academies).
