= Tekleab =

Tekleab is a surname. Notable people with the surname include:

- Hermon Tekleab (born 1993), Eritrean footballer
- Kebedech Tekleab (born 1958), Ethiopian painter, sculptor, and poet
