= Children's Studio School =

- Founded: 1977
- Founder: Marcia McDonell
- Type: Elementary School
- Location: Washington, D.C., United States
- Website: www.studioschooldc.org

Children's Studio School is a non-profit arts organization and full-day school of the arts and architecture in Washington, D.C., United States.

== History ==
In 1977, Children's Studio School started as a school where young children (three–five years old) of diverse abilities, learning styles, and economic and cultural backgrounds work in studios with artists and architects as a total means of education.

== Mission ==
The organization's mission is to develop divergent and multidimensional capabilities of thinking, acting, knowing, and intercultural understanding in young children for navigating the complex world in which they live.

== See also ==
- List of architecture schools
- List of art schools
