= Skunder Boghossian College of Performing and Visual Arts =

College in Addis Ababa University

- Type: State university
- Established: 2010
- Parent institution: Addis Ababa University
- Dean: Berhanu Ashagrie Deribew
- Location: Addis Ababa, Ethiopia
- Website: www.aau.edu.et/cpva/

The Skunder Boghossian College of Performing and Visual Arts is the umbrella organization for Ethiopia's oldest secular schools for the arts, offering Bachelors and Masters programs in art, theater, and music.

Part of Addis Ababa University, the college was created in 2010 to join three separate schools—the Alle School for Fine Arts and Design, the Yoftahe Nigussie School of Theatrical Arts, and the Yared School of Music—with the Gebre Kristos Desta Center and Modern Art Museum.

The college is named after Ethiopia's most well-known contemporary artist Skunder Boghossian, who taught in AAU's School of Fine Arts and Design. Its first head was Berhanu Ashagrie Deribew.

== Schools ==
=== Alle School of Fine Arts and Design ===
Previously known as the Addis Ababa Art School, this school was founded in 1958 and was the first and remains the only formal art school in Ethiopia. It was founded by the artist Alle Felegeselam with the support of Emperor Haile Selassie and the former Ministry of Education and Fine Arts. It has been vital to modern Ethiopian art as it has produced "its most prominent artists" and "all notable Ethiopian painters, sculptors, designers, and printmakers have passed through the gates of this school."

It was initially attended predominantly by traditional church painters, and the taught subjects were limited to drawing, painting, sculpture, commercial art and art history.

In 1975 the school began requiring students to have completed the tenth grade and to pass an art aptitude test. It became affiliated with AAU in 1988, after which point it was able to grant Bachelors and master's degrees. In 2012, the college curriculum was revised to better prepare its students for the international art market. In 2015, the college added Masters Programs in Fine Arts and Film Production.

The school has collaborated with local and international institutions to form projects such as the Acting Archives, which was formed with the Institut für Raumexperiment and Berlin University of the Arts. It also has hosted international conferences about space in African urban cities. It participated in choosing the artwork for the African Union Peace and Security Building. In 2019, the school organized the first Consortium of Humanities Centers and Institutes (CHICI) Africa Workshop.

=== Yared School of Music ===
Previously known as the National School of Music, this school was founded in 1946 and was the first and remains the only formal music school in Ethiopia. It has played a vital role in generating Ethiopia's music professionals. The school's mandate was "to train music teachers and professional musicians, promote cultural exchanges, impart social prestige to the profession, and educate the public. Students were required to study both Western and Ethiopian instruments in addition to studies in western classical music theory, harmony, and solfège."

It was renamed to the Yared School of Music in 1969, in honor of the Ethiopian saint of music Saint Yared, when the Bulgarian government funded a new building and instruments. In 1998, it joined Addis Ababa University to become a degree awarding institution, granting Bachelor of Art in Music degrees. It underwent expansion in 1972 and 2012.

=== Yoftahe Nigussie School of Theatrical Arts ===
Founded in 1978, this school was Ethiopia's first and remains the only formal school of drama. It was named after Yoftaḥe Nǝguśe, a pioneer in Ethiopian drama and a major dramatist of the 1930s.

Students study how to direct, write, act, and write film and theater criticism. It has collaborated with he School of Music to write and stage musical productions.

In 2011 the school introduced Master of Arts programs in Theatre and Theatre and Development, which teach students on using theatre as a tool of community development.

=== The Gebre Kristos Desta Center ===
The Gebre Kristos Desta Center and Modern Art Museum was founded in 2005 and opened to the public in 2008. It is the first and only institution dedicated to modern art in the country.

It is housed in the renovated former palace of Alga Werash Asfaw Wosen and was created to house approximately thirty paintings by the Ethiopian artist Gebre Kristos Desta. It was funded by the Goethe Institute.

The center has permanent exhibits of some Ethiopia's best known modern artists, including Desta and Boghossian, as well as Abdruhman Sherif, Yohannes Gedamu, Tibebe Teffa, Behailu Bezabeh, Bekele Mekonen, and Bisrat Shibabaw. It has hosted temporary exhibits the work of such well-known Ethiopian modern artists Julie Mehretu, Emeka Ogboh, and Michael Tsegaye.

As of January 2019, the center's director was Elizabeth Wolde Giorgis.

== Alumni ==
- Wosene Worke Kosrof
- Elizabeth Habte Wold
- Zerihun Yetmgeta
