= Livio Masciarelli =

Italian sculptor (1913–1984)

- Born: 15 February 1913; Roccamontepiano, Abruzzo, Italy
- Died: 14 July 1984 (aged 71); Pescara, Abruzzo, Italy
- Known for: Sculpture, Smithing, Forging
- Movement: Cubism, Surrealism

Livio Masciarelli (Roccamontepiano, 15 February 1913 – Pescara, 14 July 1984) was an Italian sculptor of the twentieth century.

== Biography ==
Livio Masciarelli was born in Roccamontepiano, Abruzzo, from Elpenice Nola and Giuseppe Masciarelli, blacksmith, from whom he learned the craft of wrought iron.

Livio Masciarelli from an early age brought out his artistic talent by creating shapeless objects. His paternal grandfather, Pantalone Masciarelli, influenced his artistic development and encouraged his work with forged iron.

In an edition of Corriere della Sera, 1904, on page three, Edmondo De Amicis praised for his distinguished Pantalone Masciarelli in a competition of fireworks held in Turin, demonstrating the great artistic talent of his grandfather Livio Masciarelli.

Livio Masciarelli felt passion for birds and created birds, eagles, and waders.

Livio Masciarelli taught from the 50s to the 70s at the art schools of Lanciano, Penne, Venice and Chieti, both as teacher and professor for forging hammer and jewelry.

During the fifties he was invited to exhibit his works in solo and group exhibitions in Italy but also abroad (Palma de Mallorca, Barcelona, Caracas, New York, Washington, D.C.). The sculptor, along with his works, has appeared on several magazine covers and newspapers (magazine of art and culture Nuvole, the art magazine La Revue Moderne, but also posthumous citations as those made on the Italian art magazine Italia and Italy) and received cash prizes and medals.

He also operated a workshop that trained or hosted several artists, including Carlo Rambaldi, Mario Garbuglia, Pasquale Martini and Giovanni D'Addazio.

Among the many public works commissioned to Livio Masciarelli we must point out the Young Worker, a wrought iron gate that was located at the shop entrance of the Blessed Nunzio Sulprizio in Pescosansonesco.

In the years between 1960 and 1964 two documentaries were dedicated to Livio Masciarelli created by a film maker and photo journalist Costas Papadopoulos. These two films were commissioned by RAI and have been broadcast several times by two different programs: Giramondo and Non è mai troppo tardi. The two documentaries are preserved in the archives of RAI.

Some works of Livio Masciarelli with its filiform resolution, instinctively refer to the Giacometti sculpture, such as Diogene 1. During the sixties, a particular period started for the artist strongly inspired by the neo-Cubism of Picasso, where Masciarelli creates sculptures depicting female figures, obtained entirely from forged iron. Some of these works are the Bather, 1968, the Basketball Player, in 1969, and probably the most important work of the sculptor: The Venus.

Livio Masciarelli has participated to several Artisan Exhibitions held in the Palazzo Pitti in Florence, winning many first prizes, gold medals and honors (The Venus which was exhibited at the Palazzo Pitti in the 70s and for two times also won a 1st prize).

Several posthumous exhibitions have been devoted to the artist, including one organized in 2006 in Guardiagrele for the 34th exhibition named Mostra dell'Artigianato Artistico Abruzzese, or the more recent one organized in 2007 under the name Harmónia és áttetszőség (in English Harmonies and transparencies) at the famous Cafe New York Palace Boscolo Luxury Hotel, Budapest, together with the works and sculptures of his son Clodoveo Masciarelli, as his father a sculptor.

In the month of November 2013 during the XXI International Competition of Painting and Sculpture "Premio G. D'Annunzio" was dedicated a retrospective exhibition of the artist at the Museum MU.MI Michetti in Francavilla al Mare, in which they were exposed his most important works such as: The Venus, Diogenes #2, Homage to Picasso #2, Our Lady of the mirror, Toros y Toreros and The Fly.

== Curiosities ==
The artist Remo Brindisi was a close friend of Livio Masciarelli, for summers he was a guest of his houses in Pescara and Francavilla al Mare. The painter commissioned Livio Masciarelli, to his birthplace in Penne, a door with bas-reliefs forged in wrought iron and a wrought iron gate. The gate was made by the sculptor along with one of his most prominent students, the sculptor Pasquale Martini.

In addition to forging large-scale works, such as the Bather, 1968 (size: 75 x 119 x 190 cm), the Basketball Player, 1969 (sizes: cm. 300 x 70 x 80), the artist has also created a fly-sized and well the precise size of mm. 10 x 7 height.mm 2. This micro-sculpture the artist is inspired by the legendary joke made by Giotto to Cimabue,"[...] his young apprentice painted such a lifelike fly on the face of the painting that Cimabue was working on, that he tried several times to brush it off.".

A first stylized version of The Venus appears in the film L'homme orchestre with Louis de Funès, 1970s. The work has been lost.

== Works ==
=== Sculptures ===
- St. Francis (S. Francesco, 1967)
- Bather (Bagnante, 1968)
- Horse (Cavallo, 1968)
- Basketball player (Giocatrice di pallacanestro, 1969)
- Diogenes #1 (Diogene n.1)
- Recruit (Recluta)
- Diogenes #2 (Diogene n. 2. 1973)
- Homage to Picasso #1 (Omaggio a Picasso n.1, 1976)
- Sunrise in the pond (Alba nello stagno, 1980)
- The Venus (La Venere)
- Homage to Picasso #2 (Omaggio a Picasso n.2)
- Our Lady of the mirror (Madonna dello specchio, also known under the title Madonna di Lourdes)
- Way of the Cross (Via Crucis)
- Ciborium (Ciborio)
- Baptismal Font (Fonte Battesimale)
- Young Worker (Giovane Operaio)

=== Micro sculptures ===
- The Fly (La Mosca)

=== Repoussage ===
- Toros y toreros

== Bibliography ==
Dante Marianacci, Armonie e trasparenze. Sculpture, Gioielli, Grafiche. (Original name Harmónia és áttetszőség. Szobrok,ékszerek, grafikák) in the art magazine Italia and Italy, p. 64–65, nn.34-35–36 January–June 2007 sponsored by the Istituto Italiano di Cultura in Budapest.
