= Zerihun Yetmgeta =

Zerihun Yetmgeta (born 1941) is an Ethiopian artist. His paintings and mixed media pieces combine elements of contemporary art with traditional forms of Ethiopia, particularly from the icons and scrolls of Ethiopian Orthodox art.

== Career ==
Yetmgeta artistic practice started at an early age. At fifteen years of age, he won first prize in a national art competition, known as the "All Ethiopian School" competition. After completing high school, he attended the Alle School of Fine Arts and Design in Addis Ababa (1963-1968). While attending the university, Yetmgeta shared a studio with Alexander Boghossian, known as Skunder Boghossian. Boghossian, along with Gebre Kristos Desta and Karl Heinz Hansen (his professors at the School of Fine Arts), have been cited as major influences in the artist’s development. Yetmgeta has taught at the Alle School of Fine Arts and Design since 1978.

In the aftermath of the 1974 Ethiopian Revolution, when the Emperor Haile Selassie was overthrown, many artists went into exile. The socialist military rule of the Provisional Military Administrative Council (known as the Derg) that followed, established repressive practices toward the arts, mandating the use of social realism and censoring subject matter. Yetmgeta, however, chose to stay in Addis Ababa. Since the end of Derg rule, Yetmgeta has enjoyed international prominence and has exhibited widely.

On 24 August 2019, the Ethiopian Cultural Garden, featuring Yetmgeta's original design in addition to a replication of his work "When the Sun Meets the Moon", was dedicated in Rockefeller Park in Cleveland, Ohio. It is the first cultural garden from the continent of Africa and it is believed to be the only monument to Ethiopia in the United States.

=== Themes ===
The sources of Yetmgeta’s various practices included imagery from Ethiopian Orthodox Coptic art and ancient rock art, see Ethiopian art. His works may include Amharic inscriptions and the visual allusion to prayer scrolls, icons, and altarpieces. He also creates work that relates to his connection to the African continent, pulling from imagery from ancient Egypt, West and Central African masks, and particularly traditional arts from Ghana. His celebration of his cultural roots can be found not only in his work, but also in his studio, which follows a floor plan of an Ethiopian church.

Yetmgeta works in a variety of media, including printmaking, painting, and mixed media pieces. The constructed pieces based in wooden reliefs may also include elements of parchment, bamboo, wax, and gold.

=== Awards ===
1st Prize, All Ethiopian School, Addis Ababa, 1958

Represented Ethiopia in the 4th Havana Biennial in 1991, themed: The Challenge of Colonization

Prix de la Biennale, Dakar Biennale, or Dak'Art ’92

2nd prize at the Kenya Art Panorama, French Cultural Center, Nairobi, 1994

== Bibliography ==
Biasio, Elisabeth. "The Hidden Reality. Three Contemporary Ethiopian Artists: Zerihun Yetmgeta, Girmay Hiwet, Worku Goshu." (1989).

---. "Magic Scrolls in Modern Ethiopian Painting." Africana Bulletin 52 (2004): 31-42.

---, and Zerihun Yetmgeta. "Ethiopian World Art." Ethiopia–Traditions of Creativity, University of Washington Press, Seattle (1999): 88-111.

Chojnaki, Stanislau. "A Survey of Modern Ethiopian Art." In Äthiopien. Stuttgart: Institut für Auslandsbeziehungen, 1973, 84-94.

Martin Nagy, Rebecca. Continuity and Change: Three Generations of Ethiopian Artists. Gainesville, U of Florida 2007 74-75.

Silverman, Raymond A. “Zeribun Yetmgeta: Portfolios.” African Arts 30/1 (1997), 52-57

---et al, Ethiopia: Traditions of Creativity. East Lansing, Michigan State University, 1999

Sylla, A. "Yetmgeta, Zerihun, A Spiritual Art." CIMAISE 43, no. 240-41 (1996): 82-86.

Yetmgeta, Zerihun, and Abebe Zegeye. Zerihun Yetmgeta: The Magical Universe of Art. Unisa Press, 2008.
