= Skunder Boghossian =

Ethiopian painter and professor (1937–2003)

- እስክንድር ቦጎሲያን; Սկունդեր Բողոսյան
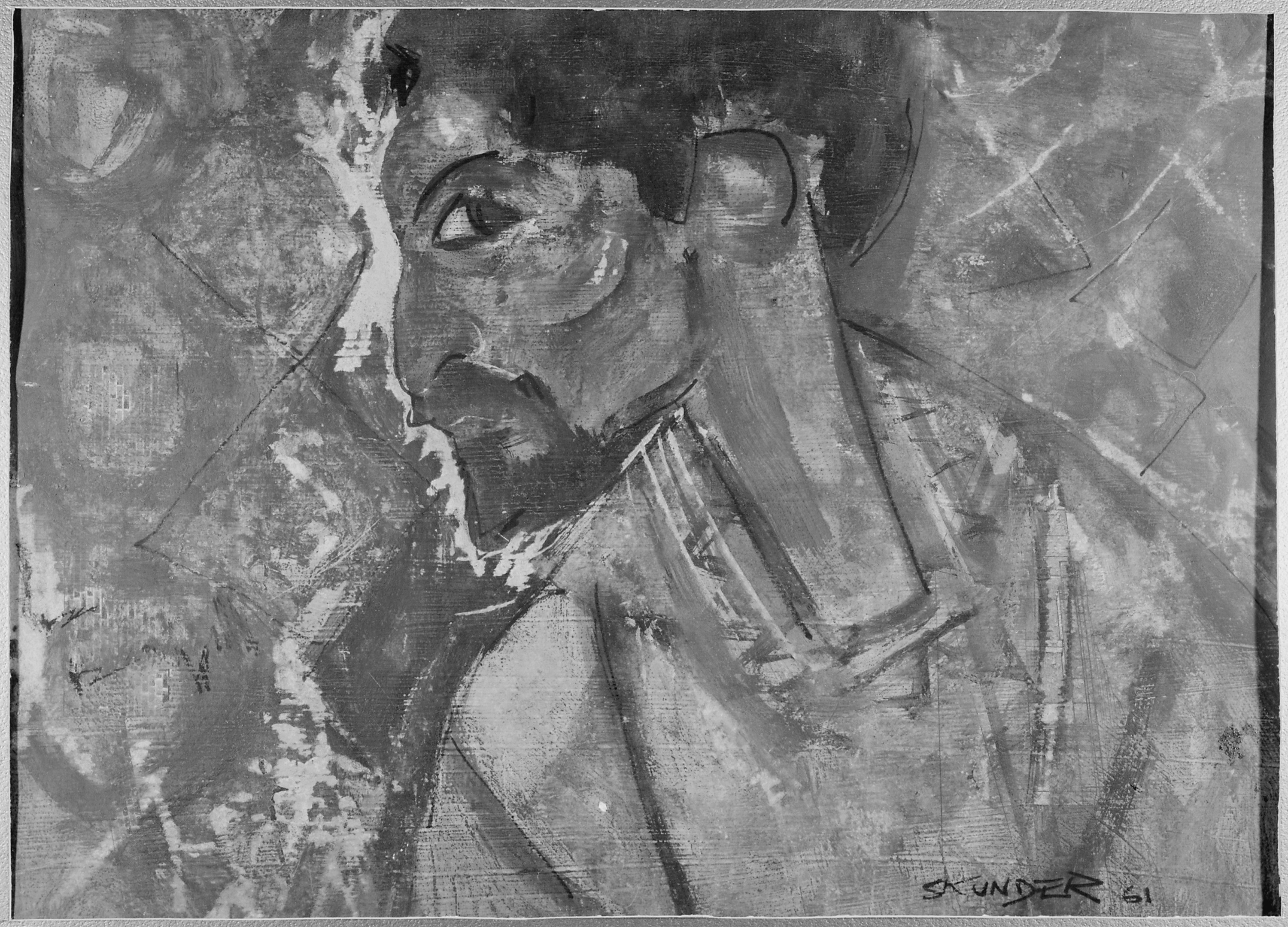
- Boghossian (1961) "Self-Portrait"
- Born: Alexander Boghossian; July 22, 1937; Addis Ababa, Italian East Africa (now Ethiopia)
- Died: May 4, 2003 (aged 65); Howard University Hospital, Washington, D.C., US
- Education: Saint Martin's School of Art; Central School of Art and Design; Slade School of Fine Art; Académie de la Grande Chaumière; Ecole Nationale Supérieure des Beaux Arts
- Occupations: Painter; professor
- Spouse: Marilyn Pryce (divorced)
- Children: 2

Alexander "Skunder" Boghossian (Amharic: አሌክሳንደር እስክንድር ቦጎሲያን; Armenian: Ալեքսանդր "Սկունդեր" Բողոսյան; July 22, 1937 – May 4, 2003) was an Ethiopian painter and professor active in the United States. Boghossian was one of the first, and by far the most acclaimed, contemporary Black artists from the African continent to gain international attention.

== Early life and education ==
Alexander Boghossian (Amharic: አሌክሳንደር ቦጎሲያን; Armenian: Ալեքսանդր Բողոսյան) was born on July 22, 1937 in Addis Ababa, Italian East Africa a year and a half after the Second Italo-Abyssinian War. Boghossian's mother, Tsedale-Wolde Tekle, (Note: Also cited as Weyzero Tsedale-Wolde Tekle.) was Ethiopian and his father, Kosrof Gorgorios Boghossian, was an Armenian colonel in the Kebur Zabagna and a member of the Ethiopian resistance. Boghossian had a sister and a half brother.

In 1938, Boghossian's father was imprisoned for seven years by the Italian authorities. His mother had set up a new life apart her children and although both he and his sister visited their mother frequently, they were raised in the home of their uncle Kathig Boghassian. Kathig, who was serving as the Assistant Minister of Agriculture, together with other uncles and aunts brought them up during their father's imprisonment.

He attended a traditional kindergarten where he was taught the Ge'ez script. In primary and secondary school, he was taught by both Ethiopian and foreign tutors and became fluent in Amharic, Armenian, English, and French. He studied art informally at the Teferi Mekonnen School. He also studied under Stanislaw Chojnacki, a historian of Ethiopian art and watercolor painter. French Canadian philosopher and painter, Jacques Goudbet, also influenced Boghossian, allowing him to create paintings without them feeling forced.

As a teenager, an African American neighbor and family friend, Larry Erskine not only gave him his first feedback on his drawings, but introduced him to jazz through Voice of America, and throughout his life jazz was often playing in the background as he worked on paintings. He claimed jazz to be "a very heavy movement of the twentieth century. It is not one person; it is not one thought, it is a combination of geniuses... the constant modulation of concepts... it is the one thing we have, black folks, as artists...".

In 1954, Boghossian won second prize at the Jubilee Anniversary Celebration of Haile Selassie I. The following year Boghossian settled in London and studied at Saint Martin's School of Art, Central School of Art and Design, and Slade School of Fine Art under an Imperial scholarship. In 1957, Boghossian relocated to Paris and studied at the Académie de la Grande Chaumière and later at the Ecole Nationale Supérieure des Beaux Arts. According to Solomon Deressa, Boghossian never finished his formal education.

== Career ==
After meeting artists and likeminded individuals like Leopold Sedar Sendhor and Madelaine Rousseux, Boghossian gained enough clout to be invited to participate in the Second Congress of Negro Artists and Writers in Rome. This along with his acclaim gained from his 1964 exhibition at the Galerie Lambert earned him an invitation to become a member of the avant-garde movement, Phase, which he left shortly to work with André Breton. In 1966 he returned home, teaching at Addis Ababa's School of Fine Arts until 1969. In 1970 he emigrated to the United States, first to Atlanta, where he became acquainted with the Black Arts Movement and taught at Atlanta's Center for Black Art, then he moved to Washington, D.C., where he taught at Howard University from 1972 until 2001.

Boghossian was the first contemporary African artist to have his work purchased by the Musee d’Art Moderne in Paris in 1963. In 1965, the Museum of Modern Art in New York acquired his painting Juju's Wedding (1964).

In 1977, he became the first African to design a First Day Cover for a United Nations stamp. He was commissioned by the World Federation of United Nations Associations. His pen and ink drawing on the theme of "Combat Racism" for the cover and the accompanying stamp were issued on September 19, 1977.

In 2001, Boghossian worked with Kebedech Tekleab on a commission called Nexus for the Wall of Representation at the Embassy of Ethiopia in Washington, D.C. The work is an aluminum relief sculpture (365 x 1585 cm) mounted on the granite wall of the embassy. Nexus includes decorative motifs, patterns and symbols from Ethiopian religious traditions including Christianity, Judaism, Islam and other indigenous spiritual practices incorporating symbolic scrolls and forms representing musical instruments, utilitarian tools, and regional flora and fauna.

Most recently, Boghossian is represented in New York by the Contemporary African Art Gallery.

The umbrella organization for Ethiopia's oldest secular schools is named after him, the Skunder Boghossian College of Performing and Visual Arts.

=== Political and cultural views ===
While he spent some time in Paris, Boghossian talked often about political and cultural influences, citing Frantz Fanon, Aimé Césaire, Cheikh Anta Diop as well as creative forces in modern art like Paul Klee. Less well-known painters like Gerard Sekoto introduced him to the great Cuban surrealist painter, Wifredo Lam. He also worked closely with a group of West African artists.

The radical politics of Black Power and the Black Arts Movement in the United States can be seen and they seem to have inspired his paintings with coded and overt political themes, such as Black Emblem (1969), The End of the Beginning (1972), and DMZ (1975). His involvement with the Black Arts Movement impacted his work in more ways than just one. His earlier paintings depended on the combination of biomorphic forms and minutely detailed abstract notations, he populated the spaces of his new work with bold, polychomatic, geometric, and "African" motifs.

=== Style and technique ===
Bird Icon (1964)

Taking a look at his heritage, Ethiopia has a long tradition of wall painting in churches and of illustrated manuscripts reaching back to the eighth century. It is from this cultural fountain that once included three-fourths of Ancient Egypt, the builders of the great pyramids and the cradle of civilization, that the artist drew inspiration from. He also mined his early childhood memories, Coptic markings in Biblical art, illuminated church manuscripts, and ancient scrolls to stamp iconic signatures thick and crusty, flat and smooth, on canvas, hardboard, bark cloth, aluminum or paper.

When considering his art as a whole, he focused on color being used to illuminate, to create superimposed dimensions of form and shape, which in turn enables the viewer to first see the painting as a unit, then as a simultaneous breaking up of images, and finally as a recognition of the identities. He wanted his viewers to look at his paintings and make up their own interpretations, all the while imagining the figures on the canvas being brought to life rather than just being placed on there. Boghossian greatly valued the importance of rhythm in his paintings.

=== Spirituality and influences ===
Boghossian, like other African American artists at this time, balanced multiple cultural, spiritual, and ancestral identities. He incorporated many different religious symbols in both his life and in his work ranging from Christian, to African, to Santerian. He would often start his day sprinkling the house with St. Michael’s holy water, meditate, burn incense, and commune with the “jujus”, asking for forgiveness and blessings. He once refused to work in a studio while creating his piece for the Ethiopian embassy because an assistant began working before he could communicate with the “jujus.” His use of these faiths was not a religious one, but a secular resepecting of his ancestors, who hailed from both Armenia and Ethiopia. Using imagery from däbtära magic scrolls, he utilizes a composition he calls “quflfu,” or the “interlocked.” This is a composition of interlacing and interweaving images and textures. This composition also mirrors Ethiopian craftsmanship like baskets and the cultural dress, the tebab. Boghossian would also directly use these däbtära scrolls, scraping the original image off to leave only a shadow of what was once on it. He would then use these remaining impressions to create more vibrant works, repurposing the scrolls.

Substance abuse combined with his spirituality also was the generator for many of his works. The Metamorphoses, a visualization of Franz Kafka’s, The Metamorphosis, is a perfect example of the combination of the two. Often after a drinking binge, Boghossian would create visceral, gripping works between the battle of good and evil. This is seen in The Metamorphoses with the evil spirit pulling him towards alcohol, and his good spirit urging him to stop. This conflict is a common theme in many of his works.

== Personal life ==
Boghossian met Marilyn Pryce in Paris, 1964, while she was studying cinematography. They were married in Tuskegee, Alabama, Pryce's hometown, but the marriage later ended in divorce. He had two children, Aida Mariam and Edward Addisu, a sister, and four grandchildren.

On May 4, 2003 Boghossian died at Howard University Hospital in Washington, DC., aged 65.

== Awards ==
- Haile Selassie First Prize for Fine Arts, 1967.
- Contemporary African Painters, First Prize, Munich, Germany, 1967.
- Twenty-Ninth Annual Show of Black Artists First Prize, Spelman College, Atlanta, Georgia, 1970.
- District of Columbia Certificate of Appreciation.
- United Nations Special Committee Against Apartheid Certificate of Appreciation, 1984.
- City of Miami Beach, Florida, Certificate of Appreciation, 1985.
- Ethiopian Embassy's Excellence Award in 2000.

== Notable works ==
- Night Flight of Dread and Delight 1964
- Axum 1967
- The End of the Beginning 1973
- African Images 1980
- Time Cycle III 1981
- The Metamorphoses 1982
- Jacob’s Ladder 1984
- Nexus 2001

== Exhibitions ==
- Contemporary Ethiopian art at the Smithsonian Institution's National Museum of African Art.
- Musée d'Art Moderne de la Ville de Paris.
- National Museum of African Art in Washington D.C.
- The Ministry of Foreign Affairs Building in Addis Ababa.
- 1965: Fourth Biennale in Paris.
- 1966: Salon de Comparison.
- 1972: The Studio Museum in Harlem.
- 2002: The Short Century: Independence and Liberation Movements in Africa, 1945–1994
