= Semyon Bilmes =

Azerbaijani-American painter

- Born: August 29, 1955 (age 70); Baku, Azerbaijan SSR
- Occupation: Painter
- Years active: 1955–present

Lady in a red Turban, Oil on Canvas, by Semyon Bilmes

Semyon Bilmes (29 August 1955) is an Azerbaijani American painter and the founder and instructor of The Ashland Academy of Art, in Ashland, Oregon, United States and Atelier Maui, in Maui, Hawaii, United States.

Bilmes has achieved national recognition as an advertising, editorial, and book illustrator. Bilmes has illustrated campaigns for AT&T, CBS, General Mills, Warner Lambert, Smirnoff Vodka, Citibank, Clairol, Western Union, Alaska Airlines, and Philip Morris. His work can be found on the covers of books and periodicals such as Reader's Digest and the New York Times. His oil painting, "Lady in a red Turban", was on the cover of the annual directory of top illustrators and designers in the country, American Showcase.

== Life ==
Semyon Bilmes was born on August 29, 1955, in Baku, Azerbaijan SSR. His art education started when he was a child in youth classes, where he studied the fundamentals of drawing. When he reached the age of sixteen, he attended the A. Azim-Zade Academy of Art in Baku (USSR) where he was trained in the Russian Academic System. Bilmes' immigrated to New York in 1980 where he also graduated from the Parsons School of Design.

As a successful artist, Bilmes founded the Bilmes Art School, where for ten years he taught art with a commercial emphasis.

Blimes later acquired and renovated a large building in Ashland, Oregon, for The Ashland Academy of Art.

In 2010, Semyon with his family moved to Maui, where they opened Atelier Maui. Semyon Bilmes currently resides on Maui with his wife.

== See also ==
- Atelier Method

Semyon Bilmes currently resides on Maui with his wife.
