= Hong Kong Academy of Fine Arts =

Art school in Hong Kong

The Hong Kong Academy of Fine Arts (HKAFA) was the first fine arts academy established in Hong Kong. It was founded in 1952 by Professor Chan Hoi Ying with the simple mission that is to design the HKAFA Curriculum for the contemporary student based on traditional methods of art instruction. Over the years, the academy has produced many successful alumni and has many notable achievements.

== History ==
The Hong Kong Academy of Fine Art's history can be traced back to the 1800s when Professor Chan Hoi-Ying's teacher, Li Tiefu, began learning his trade from the two famed American painters; John Singer Sargent and William Merritt Chase. When Li returned from overseas, he discovered the very talented Chan Hoi-Ying and took him under his wing. The two grew very close during Chan's 18 years under Li's tutelage and Professor Chan Hoi-Ying later claimed that much of his philosophy behind art and the Hong Kong Academy of Fine Arts were inherited from his mentor.

== Mission ==
Consummation in drawing skills is the foundation for the curriculum of the HKAFA. The academy offers courses in subjects related to the fine arts and designs. Enrollment is flexible, with provisions for full-time as well as part-time students. The academy also offers special courses in art and also hosts English and Mandarin language classes several times a week. There is also a student exchange program at the academy. Students also get the opportunity to participate in international symposiums and exhibitions.
