= Kebedech Tekleab =

Ethiopian painter and poet

- Born: 1958 (age 67–68)
- Education: School of Fine Arts in Addis Ababa; Howard University (BFA & MFA)
- Known for: Painting, mixed media, poetry
- Website: kebedechtekleab.com

Kebedech Tekleab (born 1958) is an Ethiopian painter, sculptor, and poet.

Tekleab attended the School of Fine Arts in Addis Ababa, becoming active in the student resistance movement during the revolution late in the 1970s. Fleeing Ethiopia, she became embroiled in the country's war with Somalia, being imprisoned in a labor camp for close to a decade. She was released in 1989 and emigrated to join the family in the United States, receiving her Bachelor of Fine Arts in 1992 and her Master of Fine Arts in 1995 from Howard University. She produced her Punishment Series of works as part of her thesis project "Humanity In Descent: Visual Images Of Human Suffering".

Tekleab has taught at SCAD Savannah College of Art and Design in Savannah, Georgia, and Howard University, in Washington, DC. She is currently teaching at The City University of New York, in New York City.

In 2001, Tekleab worked with Alexander Boghossian on a commission called Nexus for the Wall of Representation at the Embassy of Ethiopia in Washington, D.C. The work is an aluminum relief sculpture (365 x 1585 cm) mounted on the granite wall of the embassy. Nexus includes decorative motifs, patterns and symbols from Ethiopian religious traditions including Christianity, Judaism, Islam and other indigenous spiritual practices incorporating symbolic scrolls and forms representing musical instruments, utilitarian tools, and regional flora and fauna.

In 2003 Tekleab was among a number of significant Ethiopian artists exhibited in the Smithsonian National museum of African Art's Ethiopian Passages exhibition in Washington D.C., USA. Other artists included were Aida Muluneh and Elizabeth Atnafu.
