= College of Printing Arts =

Printing school in Moscow, Russia

Coordinates: 55°40′07.37″N 37°44′34.66″E

- Former names: Polygraph college № 56
- Type: College
- Established: 1922
- Affiliations: Moscow State University of Printing Arts,
- Location: Moscow, Russia
- Website: College of Printing Arts

Polygraph college No. 56 is an educational institution in Moscow. The College provides professional vocational education in the printing industry.

Training focuses on basic and advanced levels of primary and secondary education. At the end of college, graduates are awarded the qualification and level.

== Departments ==
=== Sovkhoznaya ulitsa, 2 ===
Former Polygraph Lyceum No. 314 was created in September 1977. The school repeatedly changed its status. It has trained about 4.5 thousand professionals from 12 professions for the printing industry.

=== Poltavskaya ulitsa, 3 ===
Former vocational school No. 25 opened in 1931. In Moscow, the construction of the Publishing House "True" and for the preparation of printers created a factory school. Trained graduates in the subdivision.

=== Kirovogradskaya ulitsa, 23 ===
Former Vocational School No. 205 was created in 1987.

=== Velozavodskaya ulitsa, 8 ===
Its ancestor is the FZU school, founded in 1922. It was based on the First Obraztsova typography. In 1962, it was renamed Moscow city vocational school No. 3.

== Educational activities ==
Polygraph college No. 56 carries out training programs:

Classes cover e-recruitment and layout, offset printing, binder, secretary, mechanic, publishing, printing and production, management, design (in printing); training of specialists.

In 2010, the college completed 70 years of professional education in Russia.

== Other Moscow printing educational institutions ==
- Moscow State University of Printing Arts
