= Remo Brindisi =

Italian painter (1918–1996)

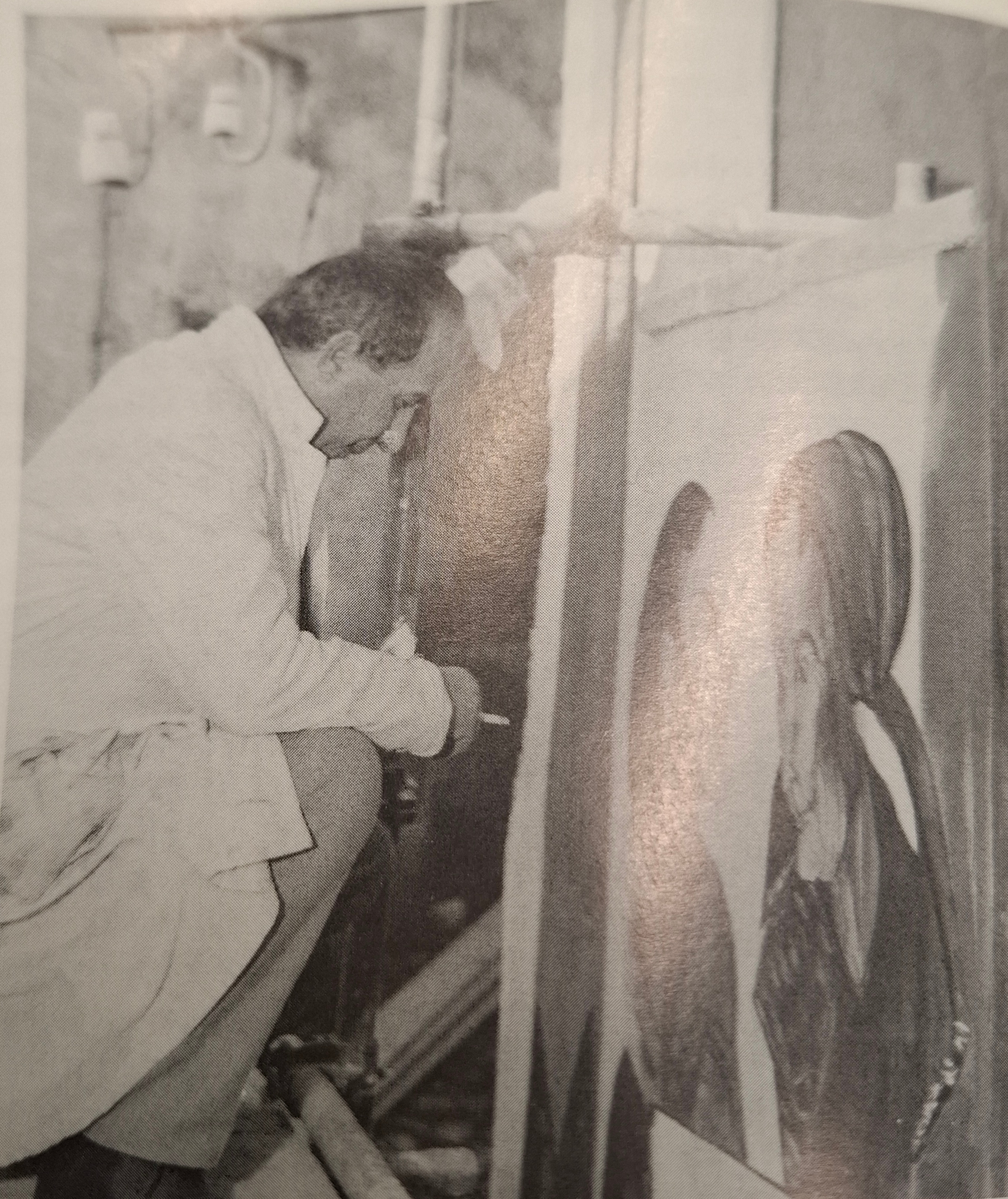
Remo Brindisi, 1957

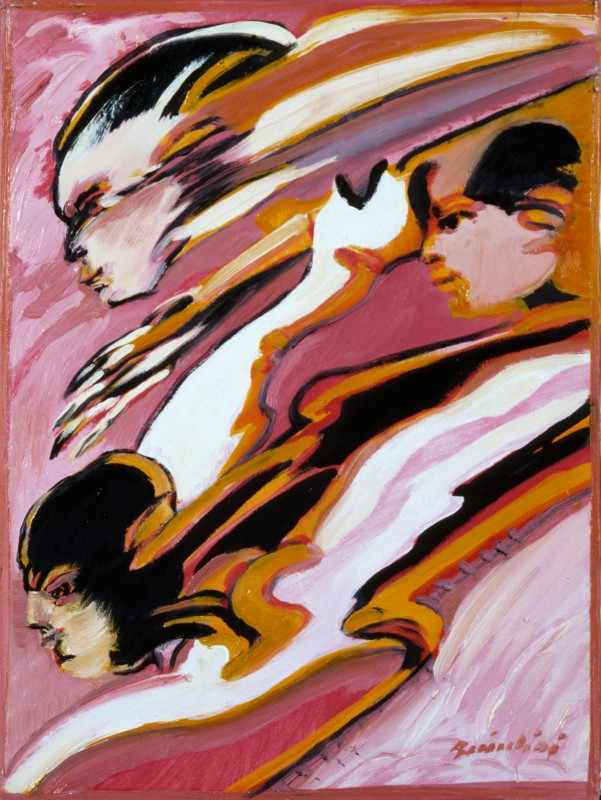
Tre profili, 1975-1980 (Art collections of Fondazione Cariplo).

Remo Brindisi (25 April 1918 – 25 July 1996) was an Italian painter.

== Biography ==
Born in Rome, Brindisi was trained by his father, a skilled wood carver, in Pescara and L'Aquila. Having attended the Experimental Centre of Stage Design in Rome for a short period during 1935, he obtained a grant to study at the Institute of Book Decoration and Illustration in Urbino, where he specialized in graphic art and printmaking and served a professional apprenticeship as an illustrator.

He came into contact with Ardengo Soffici and Ottone Rosai in Florence in 1940 and held his first solo show there, with a presentation by Eugenio Montale. The period from 1943 to 1946, which he spent in Venice, saw the start of large-scale involvement in exhibitions and constant participation in the Rome Quadrennial and the Venice Biennial as well as connections with the major private galleries of Milan and Venice.

As a result of a move to Milan, the post-war period saw a short phase marked by the influence of Cubist painting as interpreted in an expressionistic and existential sense. Brindisi formed the Gruppo di Linea together with Gianni Dova and Ibrahim Kodra and was later associated with the realist movement, while maintaining, however, complete autonomy with respect to the major artistic trends of the age. His focus on issues of social commitment and protest culminated in the period 1960–61 with a series of large paintings devoted to the history of Fascism, in which figurative painting of an expressionist character was combined with an approach modelled on the examples of Art Informel. The 1970s and ’80s saw the continuation of the same repertoire distinguished by intense and violent colour and characteristically flattened figures in two-dimensional space.

Brindisi was director of the Macerata Academy of Fine Arts from 1981 to 1983, and president of the Milan Trienniale in 1972. He died at Lido di Spina in 1996.

== Bibliography ==
- Elena Lissoni, Remo Brindisi, online catalogue Artgate by Fondazione Cariplo, 2010, CC BY-SA (source for the first revision of this article).
