= The Ashland Academy of Art =

Former art school in Ashland, Oregon

- Type: Private
- Established: 2003
- Founder: Semyon Bilmes
- Location: Ashland, Oregon, United States

The Ashland Academy of Art was an art school located in Ashland, Oregon, United States. The Ashland Academy of Art was a classically based and independent school. The academy's program was mainly based on the Russian Academic System. This system followed the artistic achievements of the Renaissance, developed and practiced by European academies until the end of the 19th century.

The Ashland Academy's curriculum combined academic art education with the latest advancements in psychology of visual perception. The academy's drawing curriculum was rooted in the Construction Method. This analytical method emphasizes a sculptural approach to form, by studying comparative measurements, structure, planes, function, and perspective.

== History ==
Preserving the unique academic system of the classical European academies, Semyon Bilmes, founded the Bilmes Art School in 1990 in Medford, Oregon. In 2003, Semyon Bilmes founded The Ashland Academy of Art. In 2004, the Ashland Academy was listed as one of Art Renewal Center approved teliers. The school was located in the former Temple Emek Shalom synagog. In late 2009, the Bilmes Family announced that the school would close in October 2010, with the faculty and some students relocating immediately to another facility in Portland, where the school's classes would continue, uninterrupted. In February 2010, Semyon Bilmes announced that instead of moving to Portland, he would relocate to Hawaii and take ten students with him.

== See also ==
- Atelier Method
- Classical Realism
- Russian Academic System
