= Colégio das Artes =

Academic unit of the University of Coimbra

Coordinates: 40.208165°N 8.422971°W

The Colégio das Artes (College of the Arts) is an academic unit of the University of Coimbra that operates in the field of contemporary art in its relation to architecture, film and the performing arts in an interdisciplinary perspective.

- Official website
