= Kraków Schools of Art and Fashion Design =

Art school in Kraków, Poland

Cracow School of Art and Fashion Design
- Krakowskie Szkoły Artystyczne
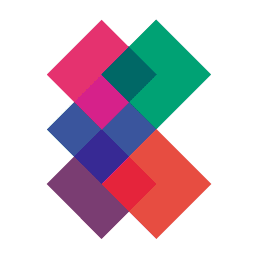
- Type: Private college
- Established: 1989
- Rector: Joanna and Jerzy Gaweł s.c.
- Location: Kraków, Kraków, Poland
- Campus: Urban
- Website: http://www.ksa.edu.pl

The Cracow School of Art and Fashion Design group (Polish: Krakowskie Szkoły Artystyczne, KSA) is an umbrella group of postsecondary art and fashion design schools in Kraków, Poland. It was established in 1989 and comprises seven schools: Fashion Design, Photography, Interior Design, Visual Merchandising, Choreography, Drama and Pattern Making.

The School is approved by the Ministry of Culture and National Heritage of the Republic of Poland, and is listed in the Ministry's Art School Directory. Tuition all faculties is run in Polish. There is also a possibility to study in English at Fashion College and School of Creative Photography.

Online Fashion Diploma and Online Photography Diploma are also available at the Cracow School of Art and Fashion Design. The School has introduced an online learning system.

Online Fashion Diploma and Online Photography Diploma programs are for students who can not travel to Poland. Online version is for full time students only.

== Staff ==
Teachers who work at school are active artists and designers who combine teaching with their professional careers. This system ensures that the students are taught by a variety of arts professionals who share with them their experience and knowledge.

School graduates are qualified to work in all areas of fashion, from fashion designer stylists, fashion photographers, illustrators to merchandisers.

== SAPU Fashion Design Department ==
SAPU department was open within the Kraków School of Art and Fashion design in 1989. The department offers two-and-half-year full-time programme. The programme is individually designed by professional artist – teachers who focus on students needs and market requirements. Most of the courses are workshops, which give students a possibility to develop necessary skills and release their full potential. The programme covers topics such as design, textiles, fashion illustration, garment construction and garment styling. There are separate workshops for life drawing, colour study, painting, jewellery design, textile technology, accessories including millinery and shoe design, fashion photography and history of fashion. At the end of the fifth semester, each student gets a possibility to design and present his own author collection on a runway show during Kraków Fashion Awards.

== SKF Creative Photography Department ==
The Photography department was open within Kraków School of Art and Fashion Design in 1992. SKF offers 2 year full-time program. The programme focus on developing practical skills, most of the classes are workshop that introduce students to all photography techniques like liquid light photography, advertising photography, experimental photography, portrait. Next to computer classes, students also master the old school techniques like gumprint. Professional photo studio, as well as a dark room are available for students. At the end of the final semester, each student is preparing his diploma collection of photographs on a chosen theme. Student's works are presented on individual exhibitions in Kraków galleries, and a main diploma exhibition presenting best works is organized in school hall each year in November.

== Achievements ==
School students take part in national and international competitions. In 2005 Łucja Wojtala was one of the finalist of the International Talent Support in Trieste, Italy and was awarded 3 months internship in John Galliano Atelier in Paris.

2008 was especially successful for the school and its graduates who have won first prizes in the most important fashion competitions. Peggy Pawłowski was awarded The Golden Thread for her pret-a-porter collection "Gavroche", in the International Contest for Clothes' Designers in Łódź. During The International Fashion Competition Habitus Baltija, in Riga, Latvia - Kraków School of Art and Fashion Design was awarded a title "The Best School 2009".

In 2009, the School's graduates won both main prizes of the 17th International Contest for Clothes' Designers The Golden Thread during Fashion Week Poland in Łódź. Małgorzata Grzywnowicz and Małgorzata Węgiel for their pret-a-porter collection "Phantas Magoria" and Magdalena Śmielak for her premiere vision collection "Destruction". Other prestigious prizes were awarded also to the School's graduates: Magdalena Dąbrowska, Grażyna Łoboda, Dąbrówka Szopa, Marta Mandla and Szymon Rychlik.
