= Accademia di Belle Arti di Urbino =

Fine arts school in Urbino, Italy

Coordinates: 43.727701°N 12.633825°E

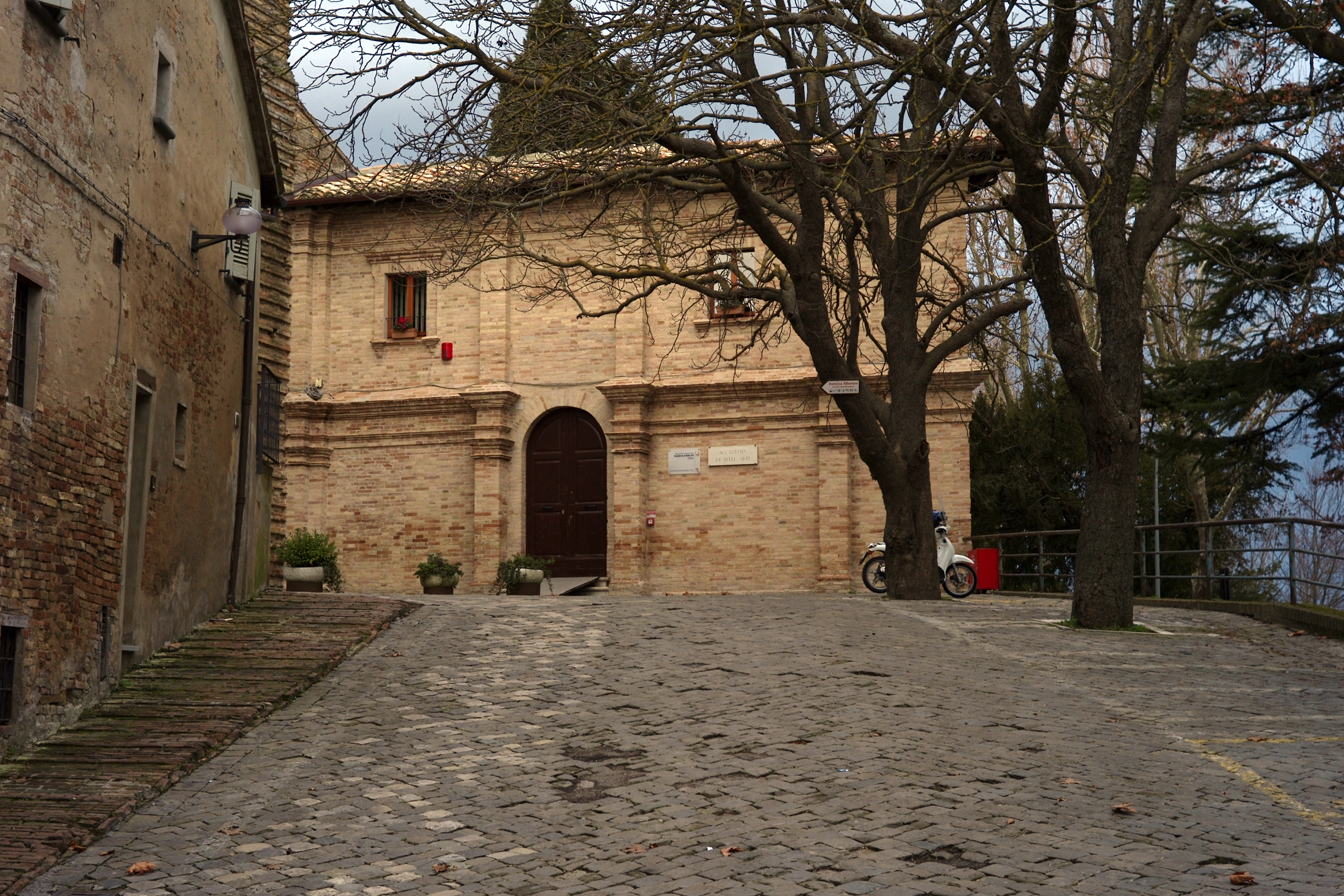
- Urbino, Italy

Information
- Established: 1967

The Accademia di Belle Arti di Urbino is an academy of fine arts located in Urbino, Marche. It was founded in 1967.
