= Accademia di Belle Arti di Catanzaro =

Fine arts school in Catanzaro, Italy

Coordinates: 38.9181°N 16.5681°E

Accademia di Belle Arti di Sassari
- Catanzaro, Italy

Information
- Established: 1972

The Accademia di Belle Arti di Catanzaro is an academy of fine arts located in Catanzaro, Italy. It was founded in 1972.
