= Accademia di Belle Arti di Lecce =

Fine arts school in Lecce, Italy

Coordinates: 40.3508°N 18.1650°E

- Lecce, Italy

Information
- Established: 1960

The Accademia di Belle Arti di Lecce is an academy of fine arts located in Lecce, Italy. It was founded in 1960.
