= Accademia di Belle Arti di Foggia =

Fine arts school in Foggia, Italy

Coordinates: 41.4618°N 15.5434°E

Accademia di Belle Arti di Frosinone
- Foggia, Italy

Information
- Established: 1970

The Accademia di Belle Arti di Foggia is an academy of fine arts located in Foggia, Italy. It was founded in 1970.
