= Accademia di Belle Arti di Bari =

Art school in Bari, Italy

- Accademia di belle arti di Bari
- Type: academy of art
- Established: 1 October 1970
- Director: Giancarlo Chielli
- Location: Bari, Apulia, Italy; 41.1108°N 16.8769°E
- Campus: Via Re David 189/c, 70124 Bari
- Website: accademiabelleartiba.it

The Accademia di Belle Arti di Bari is a public tertiary academy of art in Bari, in Apulia in southern Italy. It was established on 1 October 1970 and was formally approved by presidential decree on 15 March 1973.

Like other state art academies in Italy, it became an autonomous degree-awarding institution under law no. 508 dated 21 December 1999, and falls under the national Ministry of Education, University and Research.
