= Nuova Accademia di Belle Arti =

Design school in Milan, Italy

- Type: academy of fine art
- Established: 1980
- Students: about 5500
- Location: Milan; Rome; 45°26′44.14″N 9°10′28.38″E
- Website: naba.it

The Nuova Accademia di Belle Arti ('new academy of fine arts'), abbreviated NABA, is a private academy of fine art in Milan, in Lombardy in northern Italy. In 2024–2025 it had approximately 5500 students.

== History ==
The Nuova Accademia di Belle Arti was started in Milan in 1980 by Guido Ballo, Tito Varisco and Ausonio Zappa. From 1985 to 1993 the artist Gianni Colombo was director of the school. In 1994 it received one of the forty "Ambrogino" certificates of civic merit awarded each year by the Comune of Milan. In 2008 the school began hosting a "node" of the Planetary-Collegium research platform of the University of Plymouth.

It was bought by Bastogi Spa of Milan in 2002. In December 2009 Bastogi sold it to Laureate Education of Baltimore, Maryland, for €22 million, and in 2017, Laureate Education sold it to Galileo Global Education as part of a $263-million deal that also included Domus Academy.

The school is listed by the Ministero dell'Istruzione, dell'Università e della Ricerca, the Italian ministry of education, as a "legally recognised academy" in the AFAM classification of schools of music, art and dance that are considered equivalent to a traditional university.

A branch was opened in the Garbatella district of Rome in 2019.
