= Accademia di Belle Arti di Palermo =

Fine arts school in Palermo, Italy

Coordinates: 38°06′56″N 13°21′10″E

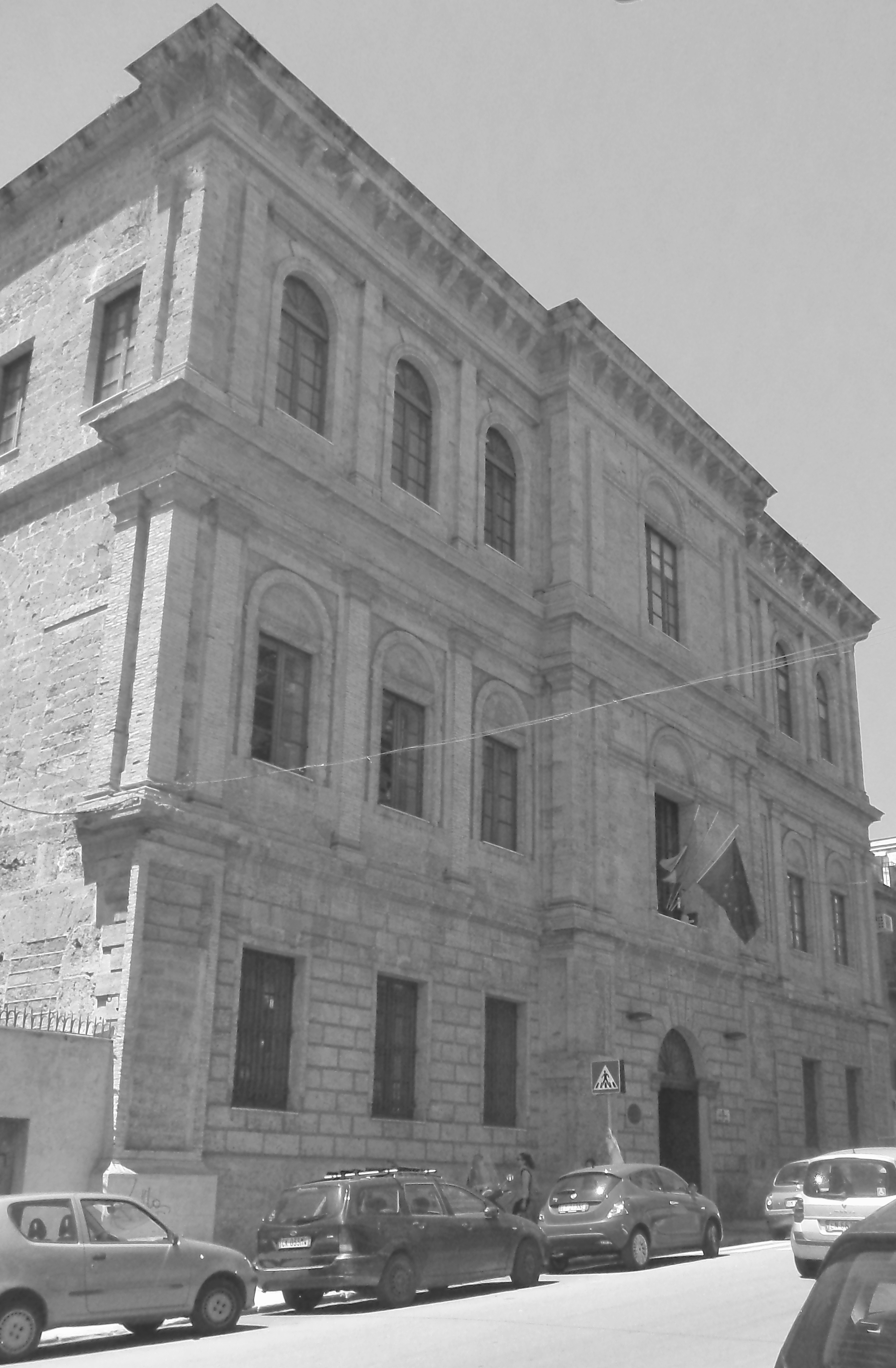
- Palermo, Italy

Information
- Established: 1780; 246 years ago

The Accademia di Belle Arti di Palermo ("Academy of Fine Arts of Palermo") is a public tertiary academy of art in Palermo, Sicily. It was established in 1780.
