= Accademia di Belle Arti dell'Aquila =

Public art school in L'Aquila, Italy

Coordinates: 42.3651°N 13.3722°E

- L'Aquila, Italy

Information
- Type: Public
- Established: 1969
- President: Roberto Marotta
- Dean: Marco Brandizzi
- Website: http://www.abaq.it

The Accademia di Belle Arti dell'Aquila is an academy of fine arts located in L'Aquila, Italy. It was founded in 1969.

== History ==
The academy was founded in 1969 and started its activities in the 1969-70 academic year; until 1989, the institute had its seat in the city's historic centre in the Palazzo Carli Benedetti. From 1989, it moved to a building specially designed by Paolo Portoghesi in the modern district of Pettino. Following the L'Aquila earthquake of 2009, the academy interrupted its activities for a few days.
