= Accademia di belle arti di Reggio Calabria =

Fine arts school in Reggio Calabria, Italy

Coordinates: 38°07′05″N 15°39′04″E

Accademia di Belle Arti di Reggio Calabria
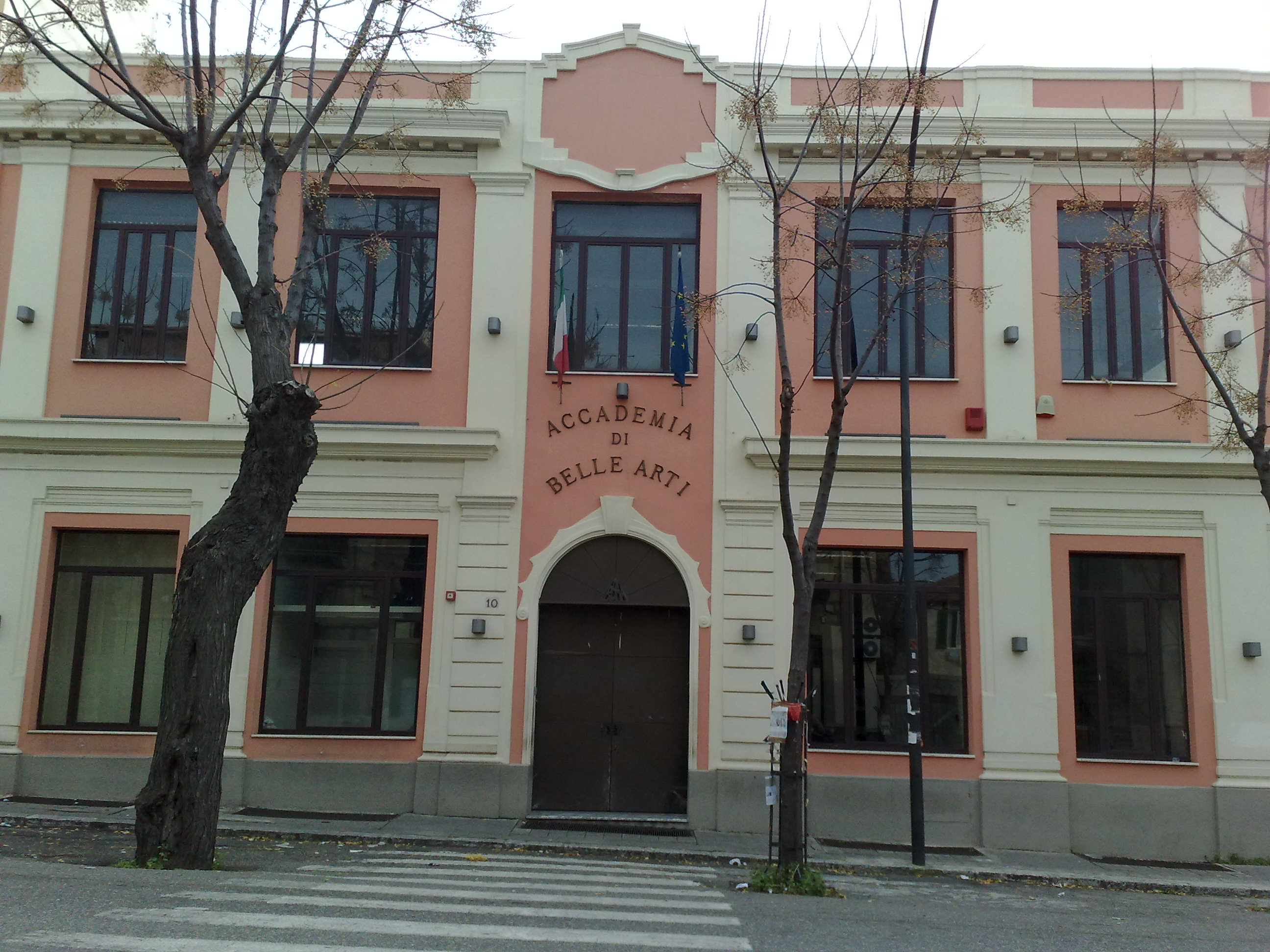
- Reggio Calabria, Italy

Information
- Established: 1967

The Accademia di belle arti is an academy of fine arts located in Reggio Calabria, Italy. It was founded in 1967.
