= Accademia di Belle Arti di Catania =

Fine arts school in Catania, Sicily, Italy

Coordinates: 37.51286°N 15.07539°E

- Catania, Italy

Information
- Established: 1967

The Accademia di Belle Arti di Catania is an academy of fine arts located in Catania, Sicily. It was founded in 1967 and started its activities in January 1968. As of 2013, it was the third academy of fine arts in Italy for number of students.
