= Accademia di Belle Arti di Bologna =

Fine arts school in Bologna, Italy

Coordinates: 44.49781°N 11.35319°E

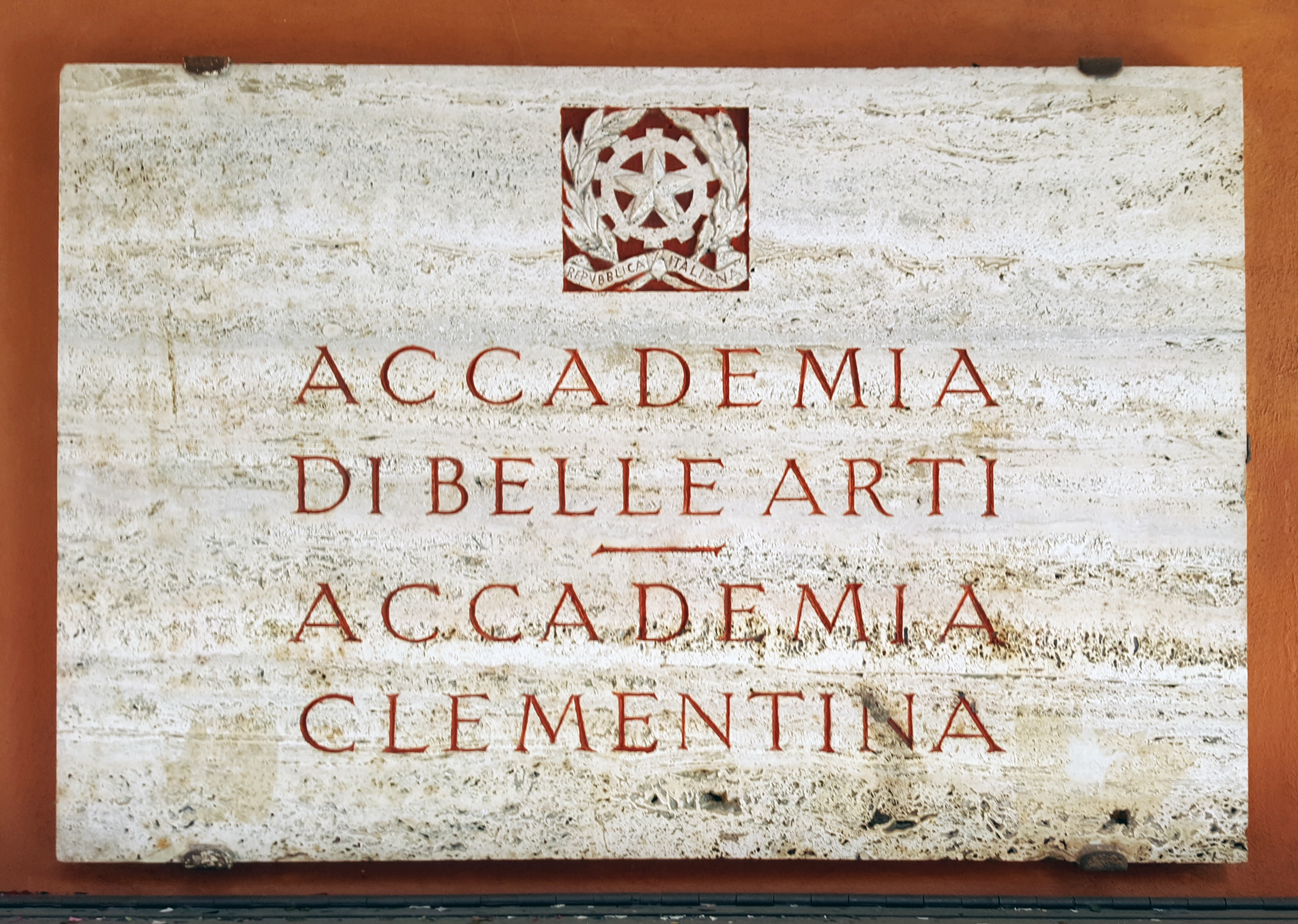
- Former names: Accademia Clementina; Accademia Nazionale di Belle Arti di Bologna; Reale Accademia di Belle Arti; Accademia Pontificia di Belle Arti; Regia Accademia di Belle Arti di Bologna
- Type: academy of art
- Established: 1710; Re-established 1802
- President: Alessandro Fiumi
- Director: Mauro Mazzali
- Students: 1450 (2012)
- Location: Bologna, Emilia-Romagna, Italy
- Campus: Via Belle Arti 54, 40126 Bologna
- Website: www.ababo.it

The Accademia di Belle Arti di Bologna ('academy of fine arts of Bologna') is a public tertiary academy of fine art in Bologna, Italy. It has a campus in Cesena.

Giorgio Morandi taught engraving at the Accademia for more than 25 years.

== History ==
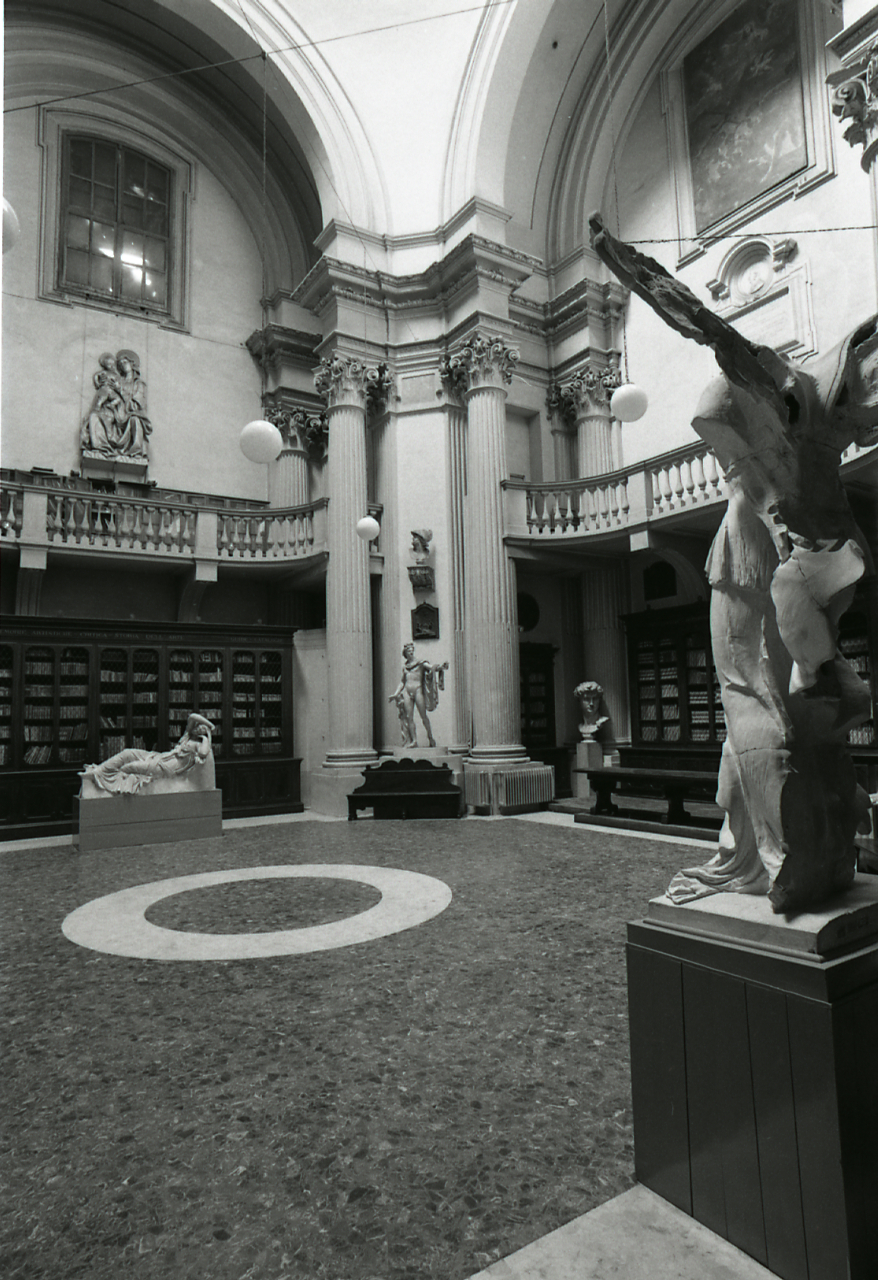
The interior of the Accademia in 1974

=== Background ===
The earliest art academy documented in Bologna was the Accademia dei Desiderosi, later known as the Accademia degli Incamminati, founded in or before 1582 by Ludovico, Agostino and Annibale Carracci, and sometimes known also as the Accademia dei Carracci.

In 1706, Giampietro Zanotti and other artists met at Palazzo Fava to establish a new academy. The Accademia dei Pittori was inaugurated in the house of Luigi Ferdinando Marsili on 2 January 1710; the statute was approved by Pope Clement XI in October 1711, and the academy took the name Accademia Clementina. It became part of the Istituto delle Scienze e Arti Liberali, founded with the support of the pope by Marsili on 12 December 1711, which in 1714 changed its name to Accademia delle Scienze dell'Istituto di Bologna. The Accademia Clementina occupied one floor of Palazzo Poggi, at that time known as Palazzo Cellesi; the Accademia delle Scienze was on the floor above, and the Specola, or astronomical observatory, above that.

Carlo Cignani and Donato Creti taught at the Accademia Clementina, as did three members of the Galli family of set designers from Bibbiena in the Casentino: Ferdinando, Francesco and Giuseppe. Other artists associated with the academy include Vittorio Bigari, Gaetano Gandolfi, Ercole Lelli, Francesco Rosaspina and Angelo Venturoli.

The Accademia Clementina was suppressed in 1796 after the Napoleonic invasion of Italy.

=== The Accademia di Belle Arti ===
In 1802 the Napoleonic administration founded a new academy, the Accademia Nazionale di Belle Arti di Bologna, in the buildings of the former Jesuit church and convent of Sant'Ignazio, built by Alfonso Torreggiani between 1728 and 1735. The name was changed in 1805 to Reale Accademia di Belle Arti; in 1815, following the fall of Napoleon and the return of papal authority, the academy was again renamed, to Accademia Pontificia di Belle Arti. After the unification of Italy it became the Regia Accademia di Belle Arti di Bologna.

In 1882, administration of the Pinacoteca, the art collection of the academy, was separated from that of the school, and handed over to the Direzione delle Antichità e Belle Arti (now the Ministero per i Beni e le Attività Culturali). The two institutions continued to share the same building.

With the educational reforms of Giovanni Gentile in 1923, the academy ceased all secondary education and became a tertiary-level institution; architecture courses were transferred to the University of Bologna.

Like other state art academies in Italy, the Accademia of Bologna became an autonomous degree-awarding institution under law no. 508 dated 21 December 1999, and falls under the Ministero dell'Istruzione, dell'Universita e della Ricerca, the Italian ministry of education and research.

In December 2008 students of the academy occupied it for a week; an eighteenth-century plaster cast was broken.

=== The new Accademia Clementina ===
The Accademia Clementina was re-founded as a learned society in 1931. It shares the premises of the Accademia, and has three classes of membership: honorary members; "effective" members, who are the teaching staff of the Accademia; and correspondent members. It publishes a journal, the Accademia Clementina. Atti e Memorie.

== Alumni ==
Among the alumni of the Accademia are the painters Pompilio Mandelli and Ilario Rossi, the painter-engravers Luciano De Vita and Paolo Manaresi, and the sculptors Quinto Ghermandi and Luciano Minguzzi.

== See also ==
- List of art schools in Europe
- List of academies of fine art in Italy
