= Accademia di Belle Arti di Frosinone =

Fine arts school in Frosinone, Italy

Coordinates: 41°38′24″N 13°20′56″E

- Frosinone, Italy

Information
- Type: art academy
- Established: 1973

The Accademia di Belle Arti di Frosinone is an academy of Fine arts located in Frosinone, Italy. It was founded in 1973.

== Academics and alumni ==
- Jago (1987), sculptor
