= Accademia di Belle Arti di Sassari =

Fine arts school in Sassari, Italy

Coordinates: 40.7180°N 8.5704°E

- Sassari, Italy

Information
- Established: 1989

The Accademia di Belle Arti "Mario Sironi" di Sassari is an academy of fine arts located in Sassari, Sardinia. It was founded in 1989 and it is the more recently established Italian state academy of fine art.
