= Accademia di Belle Arti di Macerata =

Fine arts school in Macerata, Italy

Coordinates: 43°18′3.65″N 13°27′2.85″E

- Macerata, Italy

Information
- Established: 1972
- Website: http://www.abamc.it/eng/

The Accademia di Belle Arti di Macerata is an academy of fine arts in Macerata, Italy.

The Accademia was founded in 1972, located in the Palazzo Buonaccorsi. After the Umbria and Marche earthquake of 1997, it was moved to its current location, in an 18th-century former convent. Among its directors were painters and art critics, including Remo Brindisi.
