= Libera Accademia di Belle Arti =

Fine arts school in Brescia, Italy

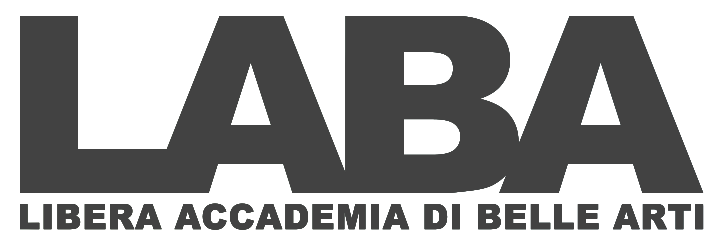
- Other names: LABA
- Type: Academy of Fine Arts, Private
- Established: 1999
- President: Luigi Bracchi
- Director: Roberto Dolzanelli
- Location: Via Don G. Vender, 66 , Brescia, 25127, Italy
- Campus: Brescia, Florence, and Rimini
- Website: laba.edu

Libera Accademia di Belle Arti (Academy of Fine Arts), or LABA in short, is a Fine Arts University in Italy, with main campus in Brescia and branch campuses in Florence and Rimini. LABA offers undergraduate and postgraduate programs in the fields of art, new technologies, design, fashion, photography, film and theater, visual arts, architecture and interior design, scenography, graphic design, multimedia, cultural heritage, art therapy and arts administration. The university is accredited by Italian Ministry of Education, Universities and Research (MIUR).

== Programmes ==
Undergraduate (Laurea) - Scenography with a concentration in Drama and Performative Arts - Scenography with a concentration in Cinema, Audiovisual and Multimedia - Graphic Design and Multimedia Arts - Fashion Design - Design - New Art Technologies - Photography - Painting, Visual Art - Interior Design (Decoration)

Postgraduate (Laurea Magistrale and Master 1st Level) - Cinema & Audiovisual - Industrial and Research Design - Interior and Urban Design - Painting - Scenography - Photography - 3D Animation - Web & App Design - Re-design Medicine - Photography - Accessory design - Curatorship and Arts and Cultural Heritage Management - Arts Therapies

== Internationalisation ==
LABA has a campus in Douala in Cameroon. The university has collaborations with several universities and institutions in China and Vietnam.
