= Academy of Fine Arts, Verona =

Art school in Verona, Italy

Accademia di Belle Arti di Verona
- Accademia di Belle Arti Gian Bettino Cignaroli di Verona
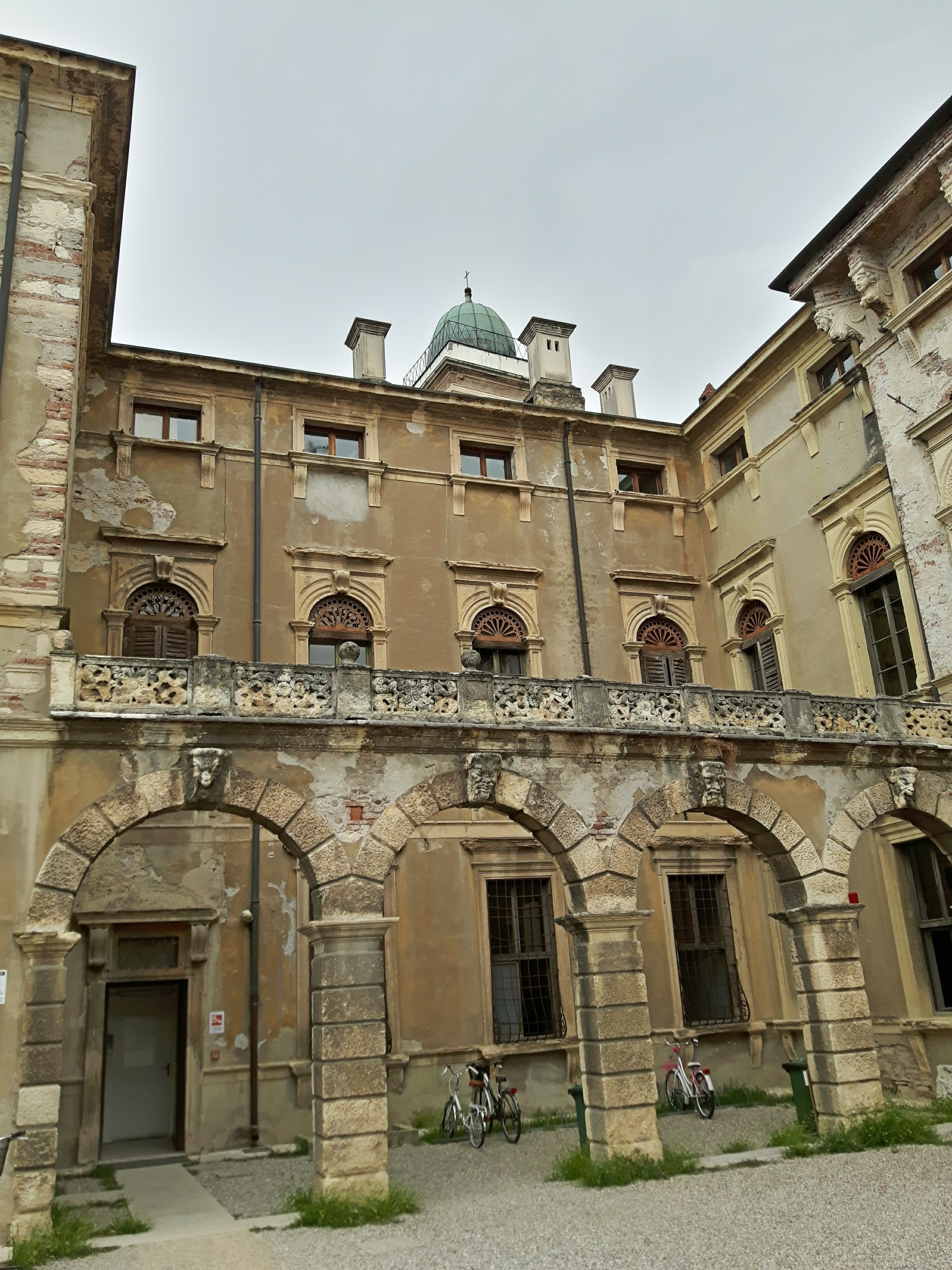
- Type: Academy of Fine Arts, Private
- President: Stefano Pachera
- Director: Francesco Ronzon
- Location: Via Carlo Montanari, 5 , Verona, 37122, Italy; 45.4349°N 10.9928°E
- Website: www.accademiabelleartiverona.it

The Academy of Fine Arts of Verona is a post-secondary school for studies in the visual arts.

Under the current European regulations (Bologna Process), the Academy of Fine Arts of Verona is included in the university program in the field of artistic and musical training, issuing bachelor's degrees, master's degrees and Continuing Education Certificates in the following areas: painting/visual arts, sculpture/visual arts, scenography, decoration, design and restoration.

The title for Diploma Accademico (master of art) graduate students is Dottore/Dottoressa (abbrev. Dott./Dott.ssa or Dr., meaning Doctor), not to be confused with the title for the PhD level graduate, which is Dottore/Dottoressa di Ricerca. In the Italian system, graduates from the fields of Education, Art and Music are also called Dr. Prof. (or simply Professore) or Maestro. The "Diploma Accademico" degree issued by the academy represents the highest level of artistic education issued by the Italian University System. For the students who are willing to add more experience to their degree, there are several options available, like Continuing Education Certificates, Post-MA Courses (both valid as credit for PhD programs) and professional certificates.

All the degrees issued by the Academy of Verona are Internationally recognized, as stated by the Law n. Legge 508/99 and n.268, November 22, 2002 of the Ministero della Pubblica Istruzione (Legge 22 novembre 2002, n. 268; Dec. Law St., November 3, 1999, n.509.) and by the Resolution of the European Commission for the Higher Education Area in Academic Degrees presented in the Bologna Process.

== See also ==
- List of art schools in Europe
