= List of Ethiopian artists =

The following list of Ethiopian artists (in alphabetical order by last name) includes artists of various genres, who are notable and are either born in Ethiopia, of Ethiopian descent or who produce works that are primarily about Ethiopia.

== A ==
- Amsale Aberra (1954–2018), Ethiopian American fashion designer, entrepreneur
- Fikirte Addis (born 1981), fashion designer
- Mahlet Afework, fashion designer, entrepreneur
- Fasil Assefa (born 1984), painter

== B ==
- Mickaël Bethe-Selassié (1951–2020), sculptor known for papier mâché
- Skunder Boghossian (1937–2003), painter, art teacher; Ethiopian of Armenian heritage
- Yadesa Bojia (born 1970), artist, designer; lives in Seattle
- Nicolò Brancaleon (c. 1460 – after 1526), Italian painter whose adopted the art style in Ethiopia

== C ==
- Sheba Chhachhi (born 1958), Ethiopian-born Indian photographer, filmmaker, installation artist, women's rights activist, writer

== D ==
- Gebre Kristos Desta (1932–1981), painter and poet

== E ==
- Agegnehu Engida (1905–1950), modern painter
- Awol Erizku (born 1988), Ethiopian-born American painter, photographer, sculptor, and filmmaker

== F ==
- Dege Feder (born 1978), Ethiopian-born Israeli singer, painter, and dancer

== G ==
- Gedewon (1939–1995), Ethiopian drawer and draftsman
- Lemma Guya (1928–2020), portrait painter, airplane pilot, author

== J ==
- Eyerusalem Jiregna (born 1993), photographer

== K ==
- Wosene Worke Kosrof (born 1955), painter, mixed-media artist

== M ==
- Tadesse Mamechae (born 1941), sculptor
- Julie Mehretu (born 1970), Ethiopian-born American painter, printmaker, drawer
- Aïda Muluneh (born 1974), photographer, painter

== N ==
- Martha Nasibù (1931–2019), writer, artist

== P ==
- Etiyé Dimma Poulsen (born 1968), Ethiopian-born Danish sculptor, ceramicist

== S ==
- Ale Felege Selam (1924–2016), painter, school founder

== T ==
- Afewerk Tekle (1932–2012), painter, stained glass artist; known for Ethiopian Orthodox religious art
- Kebedech Tekleab (born 1958), painter, sculptor, poet
- Adamu Tesfaw (born 1933), painter known for Ethiopian Orthodox religious art
- Mamo Tessema (1935-2007), sculptor, ceramicist, curator
- Abel Tilahun (born 1983), sculptor
- Michael Tsegaye (born 1975), photographer, painter

== U ==
- Tesfaye Urgessa (born 1983), painter; lives in Germany

== W ==
- Elizabeth Habte Wold (born 1963), mixed-media artist, multimedia artist

== Y ==
- Zerihun Yetmgeta (born 1941), painter known for Ethiopian Orthodox religious art

== See also ==
- African art
- Ethiopian art
- Ethiopian Orthodox Tewahedo Church
- List of Ethiopian Americans
- List of Ethiopian women artists
