= Ethiopian art =

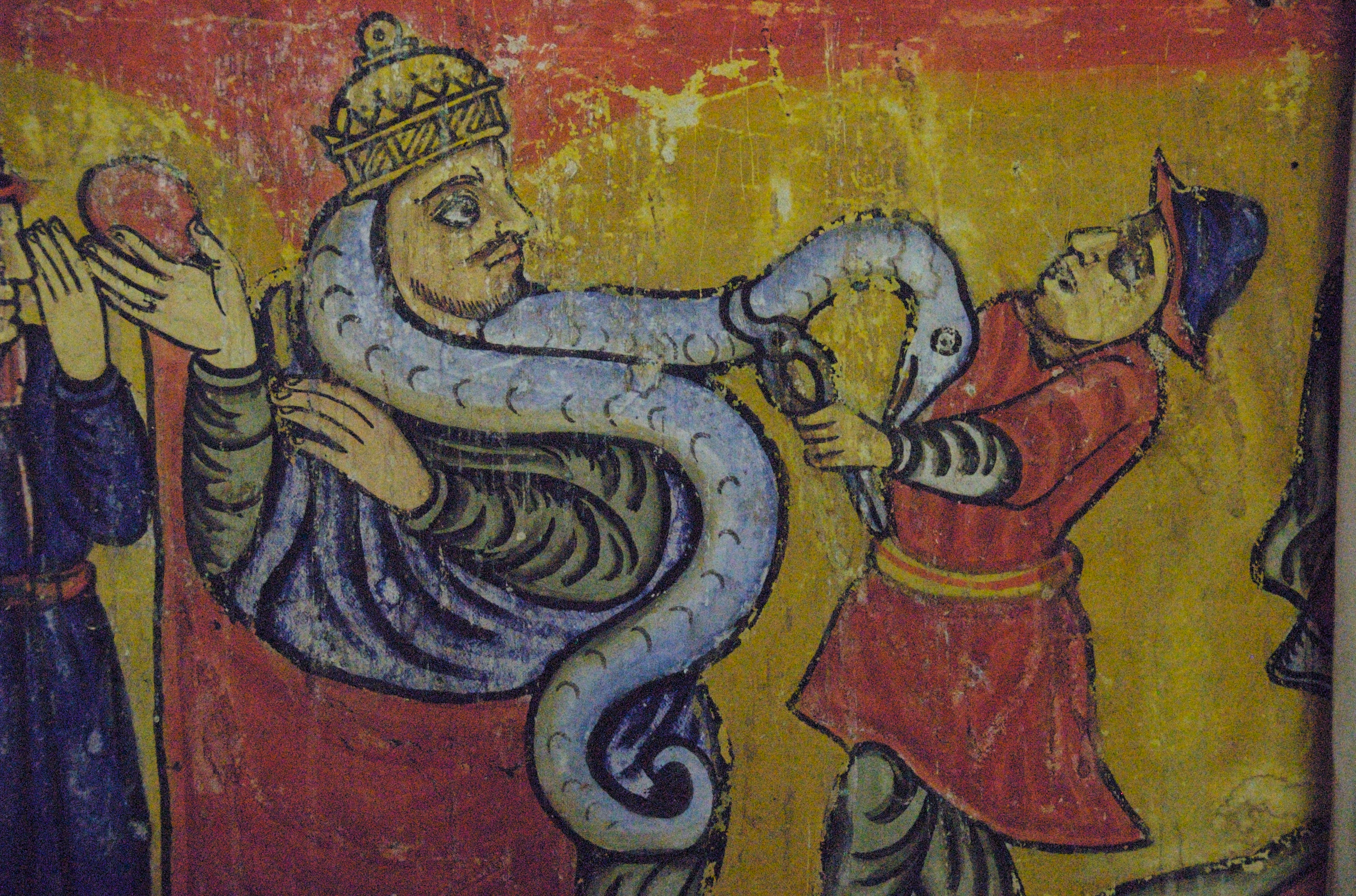
Painting in Istifanos Monastery

Ethiopian art is the manifestation in art of the Ethiopian civilization. In a primarily Christian civilization, Ethiopian art traditions have developed for millennia alongside Christian Art the world over, and since the 7th century, the Islamic artistic traditions as well. The main artistic expressions have been architecture, painting, goldsmithing, and manuscript illuminations. There is also a range of traditions in textiles, many with woven geometric decoration, alongside many more plain styles.

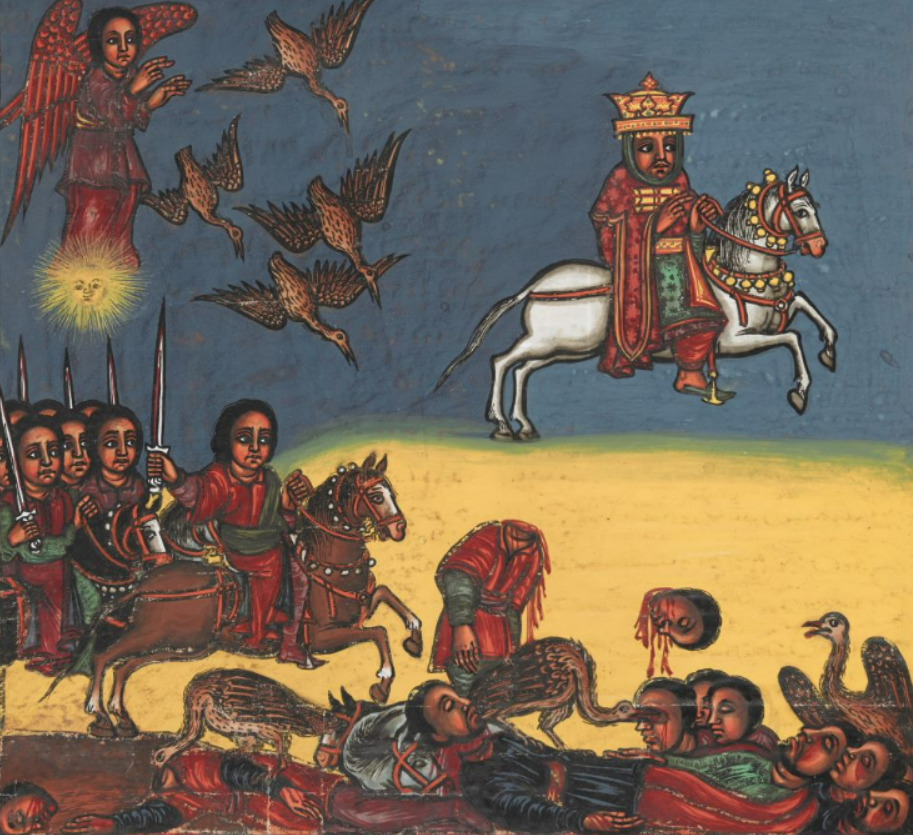
Gondarine Chronical

== Overview ==
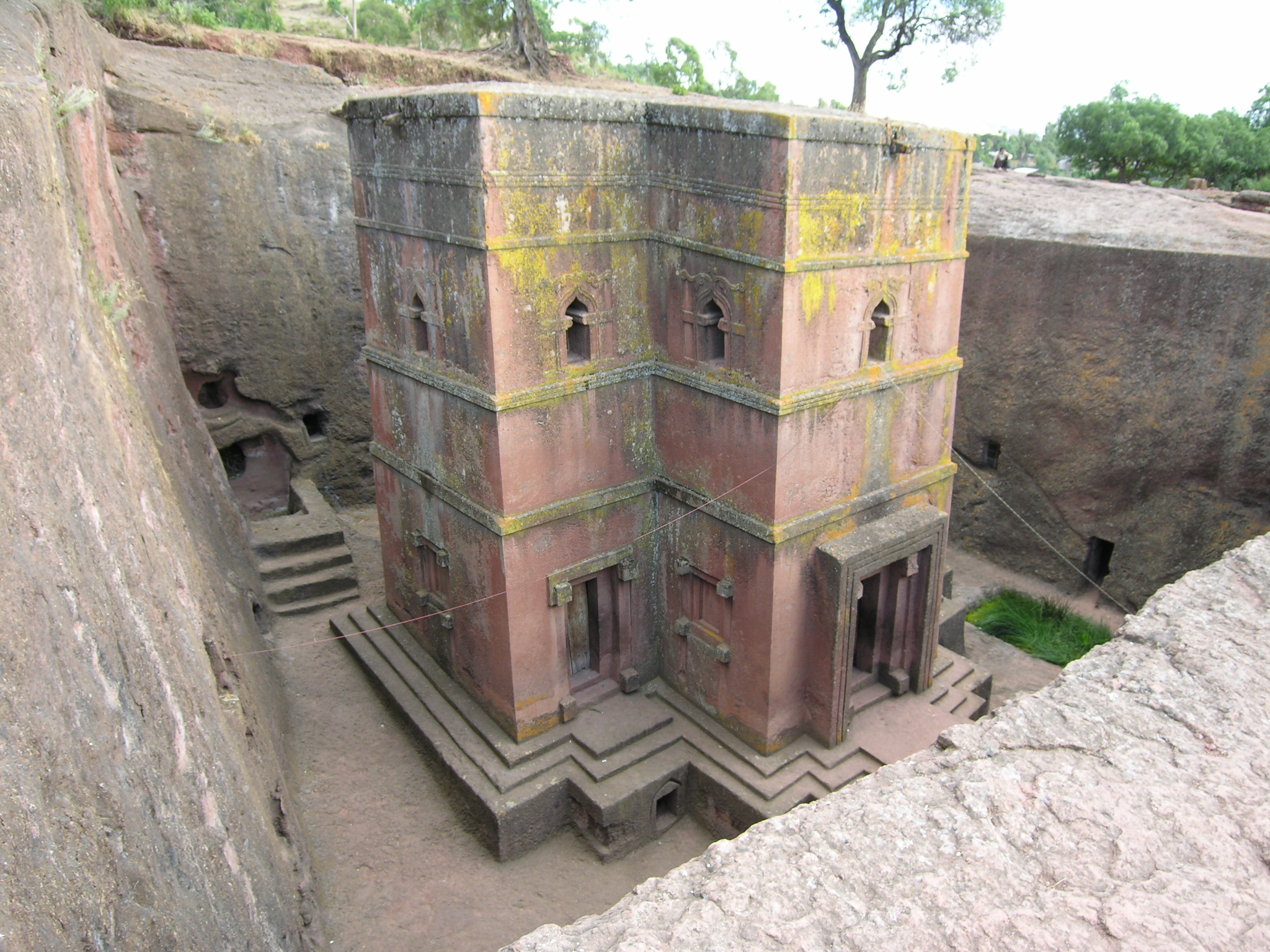
The rock-cut Church of Saint George, Lalibela (Biete Ghiogis)

Prehistoric rock art comparable to that of other African sites survives in a number of places, and until the arrival of Christianity stone stelae, often carved with simple reliefs, were erected as grave-markers and for other purposes in many regions; Tiya is one important site. The "pre-Axumite" Iron Age culture of about the 5th century BCE to the 1st century CE was influenced by the Kingdom of Kush to the north, and settlers from Arabia, and produced cities with simple temples in stone, such as the ruined continuations of traditional church art. The powerful Kingdom of Aksum emerged in the 1st century BCE and dominated Ethiopia until the 10th century, has become very largely Christian from the 4th century.

== Types ==
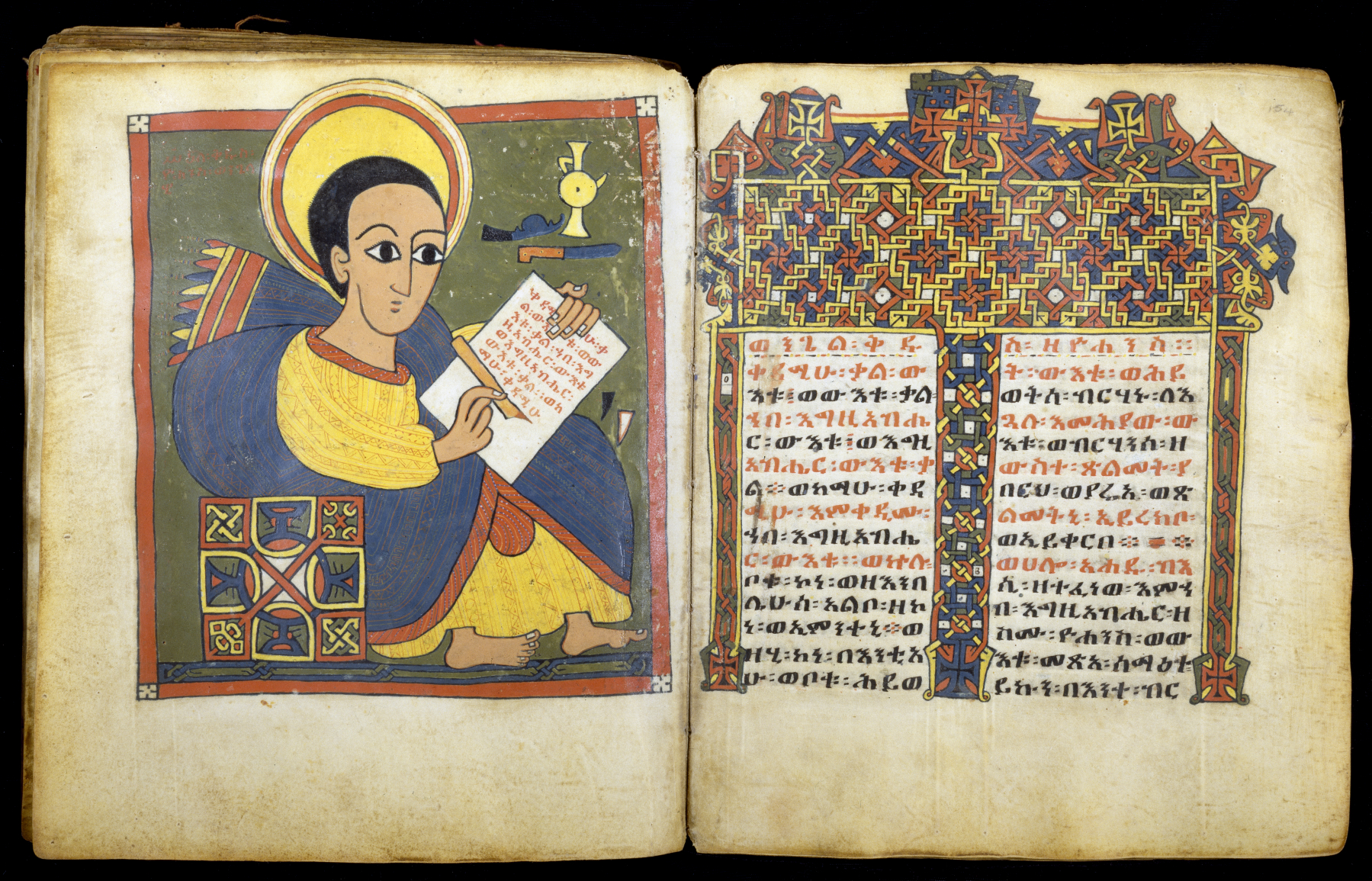
Depiction of John the Evangelist in one of the Gunda Gunde Gospels, c. 1540

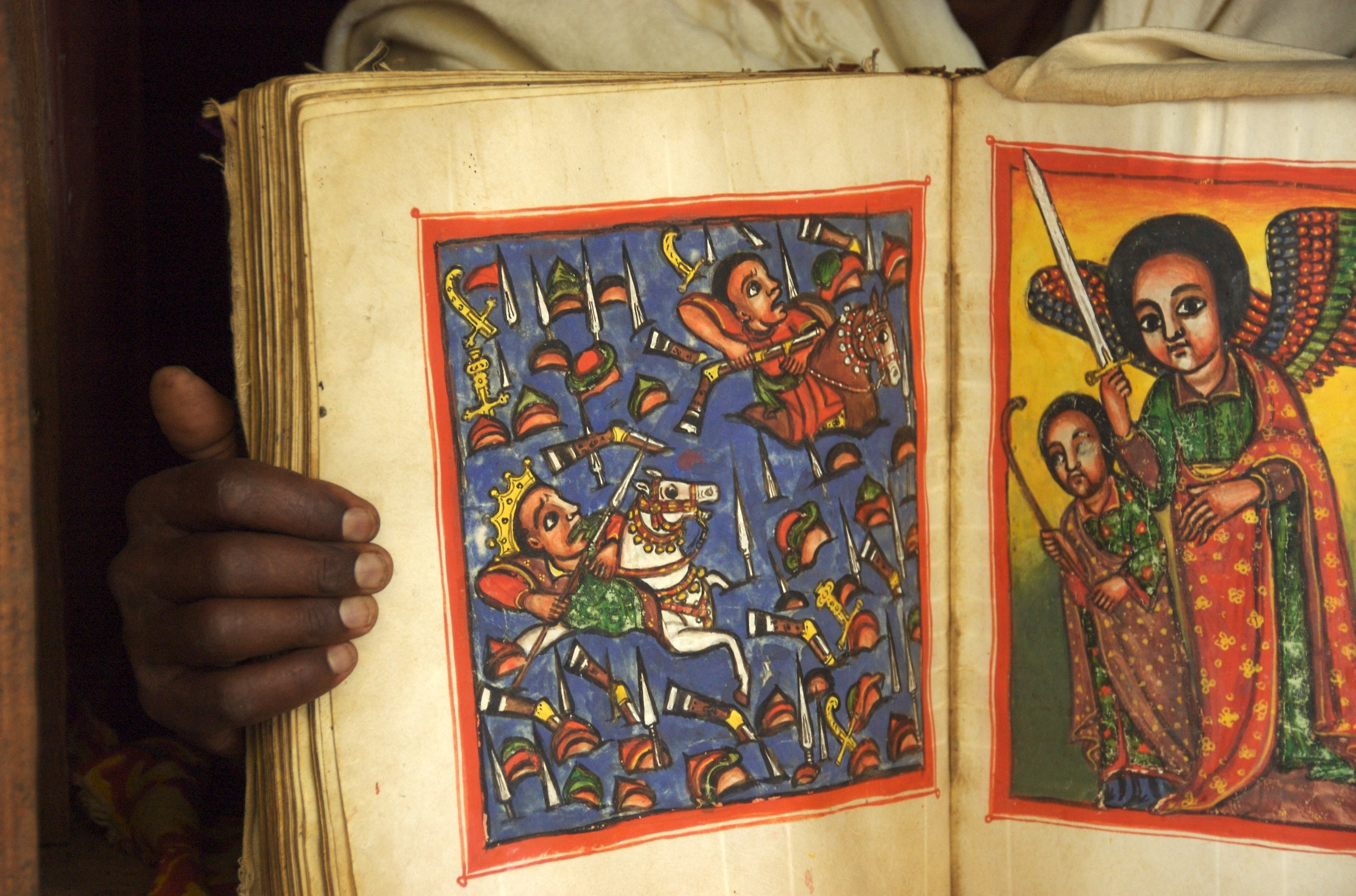
From the treasury of the Church of Narga Selassie, Dek Island, Lake Tana, Ethiopia

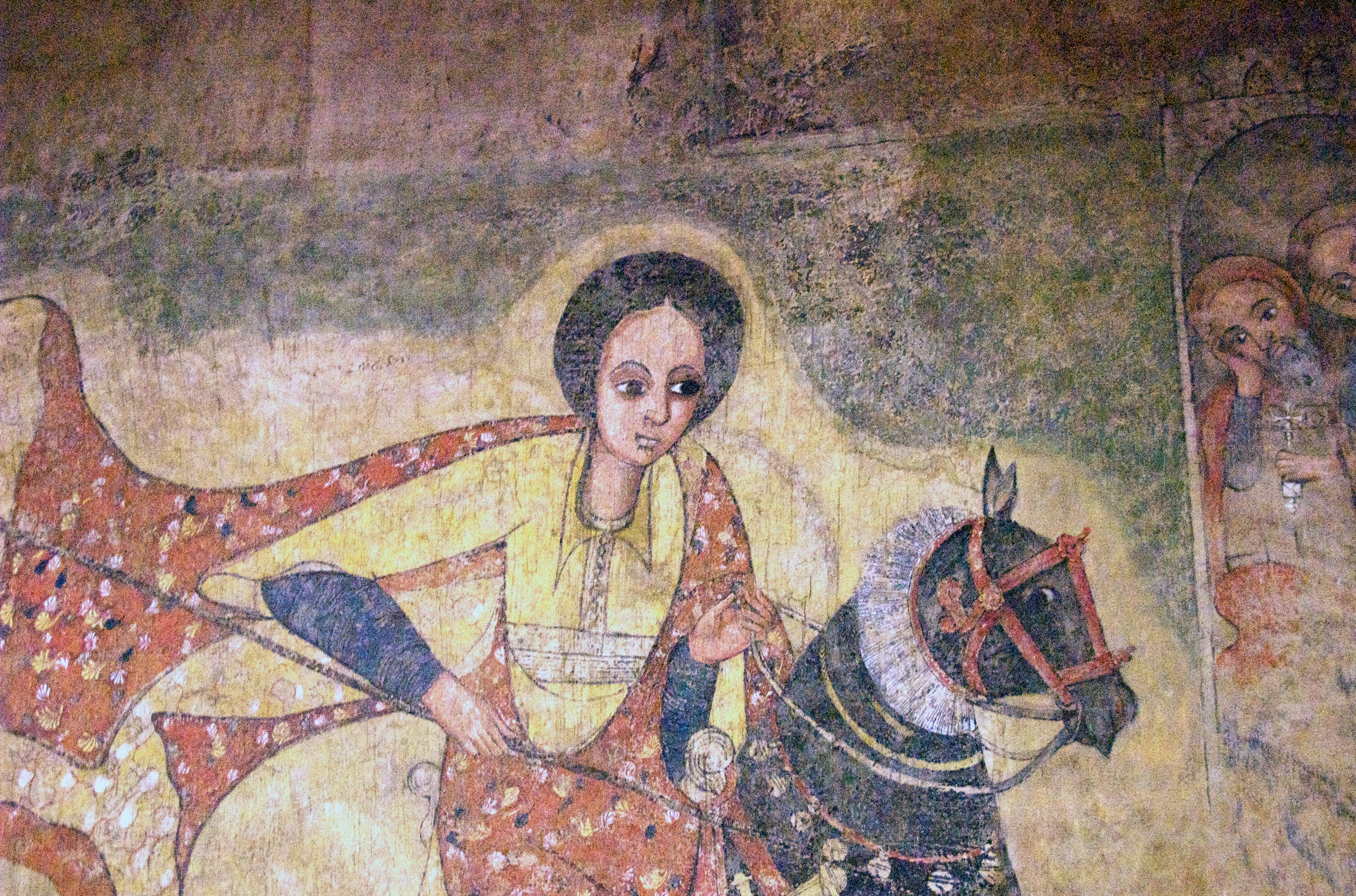
A 17th-century Gondarene-style Ethiopian painting depicting Saint Mercurius, originally from Lalibela, now housed in the National Museum of Ethiopia in Addis Ababa

=== Painting ===
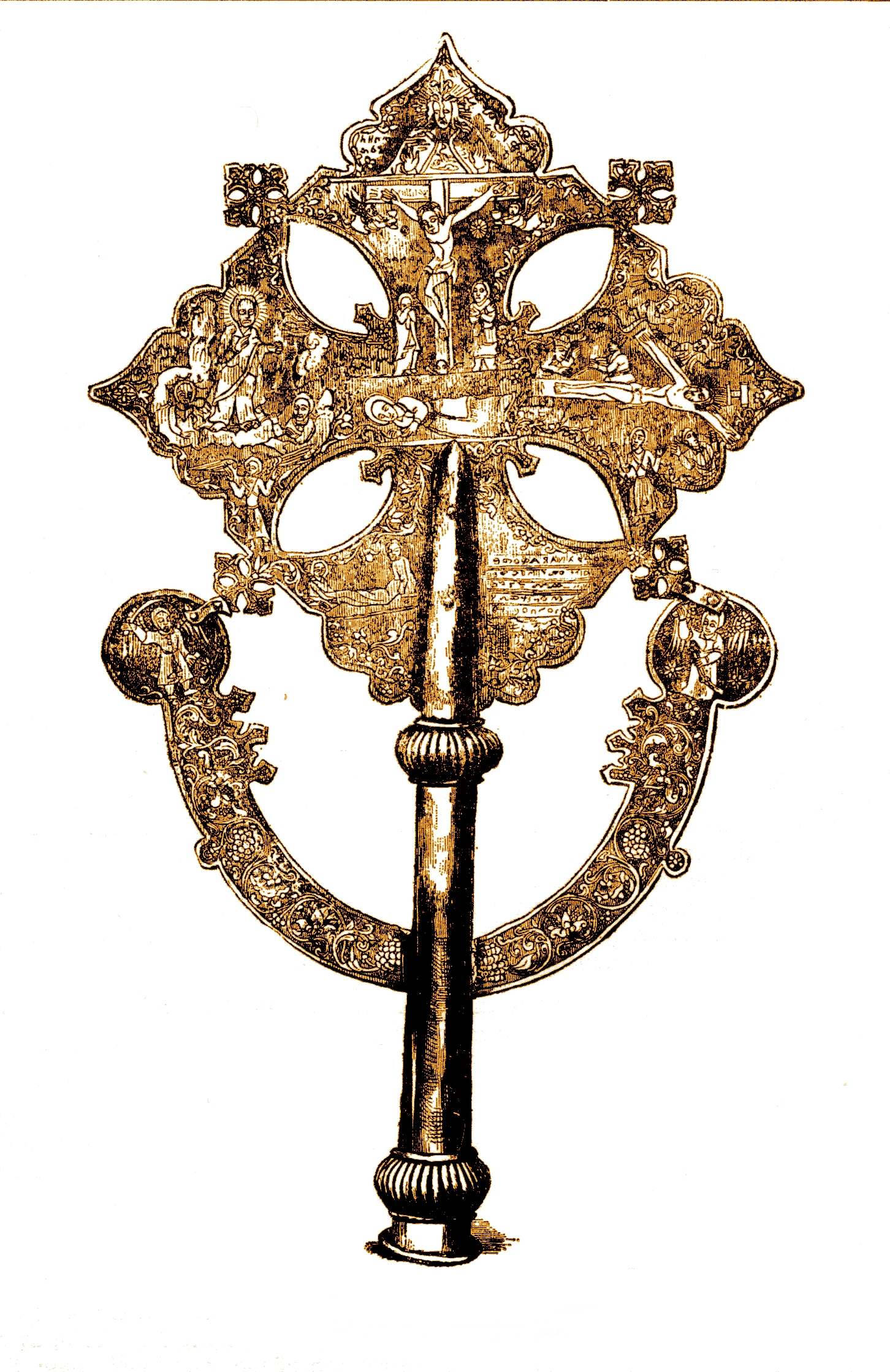
Cross of Emperor Theodore II

Church paintings in Ethiopia were likely produced as far back as the introduction of Christianity in the 4th century AD, although the earliest surviving examples come from the church of Debre Selam Mikael in the Tigray Region, dated to the 11th century AD. However, the 7th-century AD followers of the Islamic prophet Muhammad who fled to Axum in temporary exile mentioned that the original Church of Our Lady Mary of Zion was decorated with paintings. Other early paintings include those from the rock-hewn churches of Lalibela, dated to the 12th century AD, and in nearby Geneta Maryam, dated to the 13th century AD. However, paintings in illuminated manuscripts predate the earliest surviving church paintings; for instance, the Ethiopian Garima Gospels of the 4th-6th centuries AD contain illuminated scenes imitating the contemporary Byzantine style.

Ethiopian painting, on walls, in books, and in icons, is highly distinctive, though the style and iconography are closely related to the simplified Coptic version of Late Antique and Byzantine Christian art. It is typified by simplistic, almost cartoonish, figures with large, almond-shaped, eyes. Colours are usually bright and vivid. Most paintings are religious in nature, often decorating church walls and bibles. One of the best-known examples of this type of painting is at Debre Berhan Selassie in Gondar (pictured), famed for its angel-covered roof (angels in Ethiopian art are often represented as winged heads) as well as its other murals dating from the late 17th century. Diptychs and triptychs are also commonly painted with religious icons. From the 16th century, Roman Catholic church art and European art in general began to exert some influence. However, Ethiopian art is highly conservative and retained much of its distinct character until modern times. The production of illuminated manuscripts for use continued up to the present day. Pilgrimages to Jerusalem, where there has long been an Ethiopian clerical presence, also allowed some contact with a wider range of Orthodox art.

Churches may be very fully painted, although until the 19th century there is little sign of secular painting other than scenes commemorating the life of donors to churches on their walls. Unusually for Orthodox Christianity, icons were not usually kept in houses (where talismanic scrolls were often kept instead), but in the church. Some "diptychs" are in the form of an "ark" or tabot, in these cases consecrated boxes with a painted inside of the lid, placed closed on the altar during Mass, somewhat equivalent to the altar stone in the Western church, and the antimins in other Orthodox churches. These are regarded as so holy that the laity is not allowed to see them, and they are wrapped in cloth when taken in procession.

Ethiopian diptychs often have a primary wing with a frame. A smaller second wing, which is only the size of the image within the frame, is painted on both sides to allow closed and open views. Icons are painted on a wood base support, but since about the 16th century with intervening cloth support glued to a gesso layer above the wood. The binding medium for the paint is also animal-based glue, giving a matt finish which is then often varnished. A range of mostly mineral pigments is used, giving a palette based on reds, yellows, and blues. Underdrawing was used, which may remain visible or reinforced by painted edges to areas of colour in the final layer.

From the 15th century the Theotokos or Virgin Mary, with or without her Child, became increasingly popular. They used versions of a number of common Byzantine types, typically flanked by two archangels in iconic depictions. She is often depicted with a neighboring image of a mounted Saint George and the Dragon, who is regarded as especially linked to Mary in Ethiopian Orthodox Christianity, for carrying messages or intervening in human affairs on her behalf.

=== Crosses and other metalwork ===
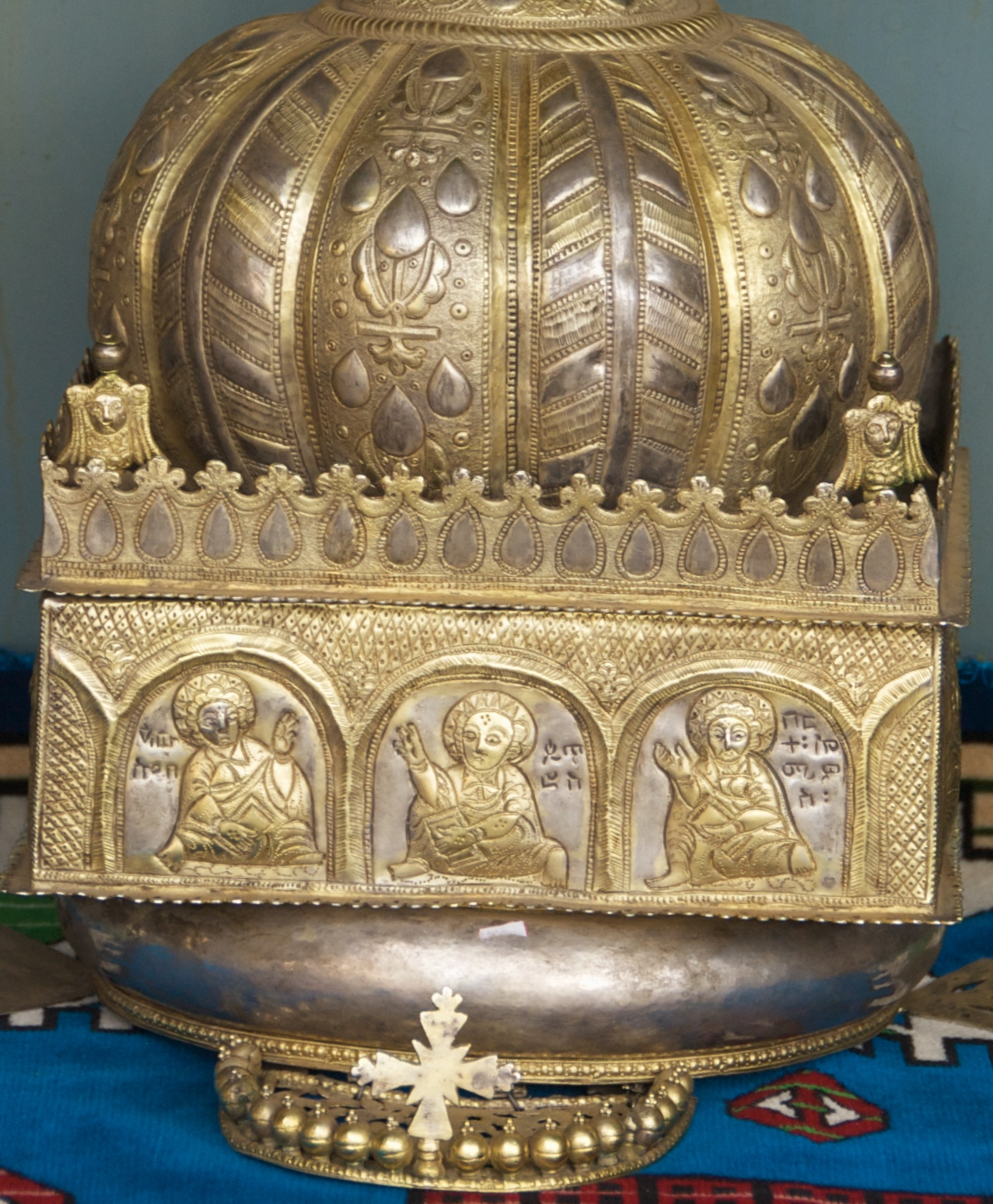
Ethiopian Crown - Treasury Of The Chapel Of The Tablet

Another important form of Ethiopian art, also related to Coptic styles, is crosses made from wood and metal. They are usually copper alloy or brass, plated (at least originally) with gold or silver. The heads are typically flat cast plates with elaborate and complex openwork decoration. The cross motif emerges from the decoration, with the whole design often forming a rotated square or circular shape, though the designs are highly varied and inventive. Many incorporate curved motifs rising from the base, which are called the "arms of Adam". Except in recent Western-influenced examples, they usually have no corpus, or figure of Christ, and the design often incorporates numerous smaller crosses. Engraved figurative imagery has sometimes been added. Crosses are mostly either processional crosses, with the metal head mounted on a long wooden staff, carried in religious processions and during the liturgy, or hand crosses, with a shorter metal handle in the same casting as the head. Smaller crosses worn as jewelry are also common.

The Lalibela Cross is an especially venerated hand cross, perhaps of the 12th century, which was stolen from a church in Lalibela in 1997 and eventually recovered and returned from a Belgian collector in 2001.

Distinctive forms of the crown were worn in ceremonial contexts by royalty and important noble officials, as well as senior clergy. Royal crowns rose high, with a number of circular bands, while church crowns often resemble an elongated version of the typical European closed crown, with four arms, joined at the top and surmounted by a cross.

== Contemporary art ==
In the 21st century, contemporary Ethiopian artists have increasingly blended traditional aesthetics with global and modern influences. Artists such as Julie Mehretu, Elias Sime, and Aida Muluneh have received international recognition for their innovative use of materials and themes related to identity, urban life, and cultural heritage. Their works have been featured in exhibitions such as the Venice Biennale and the Museum of Modern Art, reflecting Ethiopia’s growing presence in the global contemporary art scene.

Girma, H. (2023). Modern Ethiopian Art: Tradition and Transformation. Addis Ababa University Press. Solomon, M. (2024). “Ethiopian Artists in the Global Contemporary Scene.” African Arts Journal, 57(2), 45–59.

=== Other arts and crafts ===
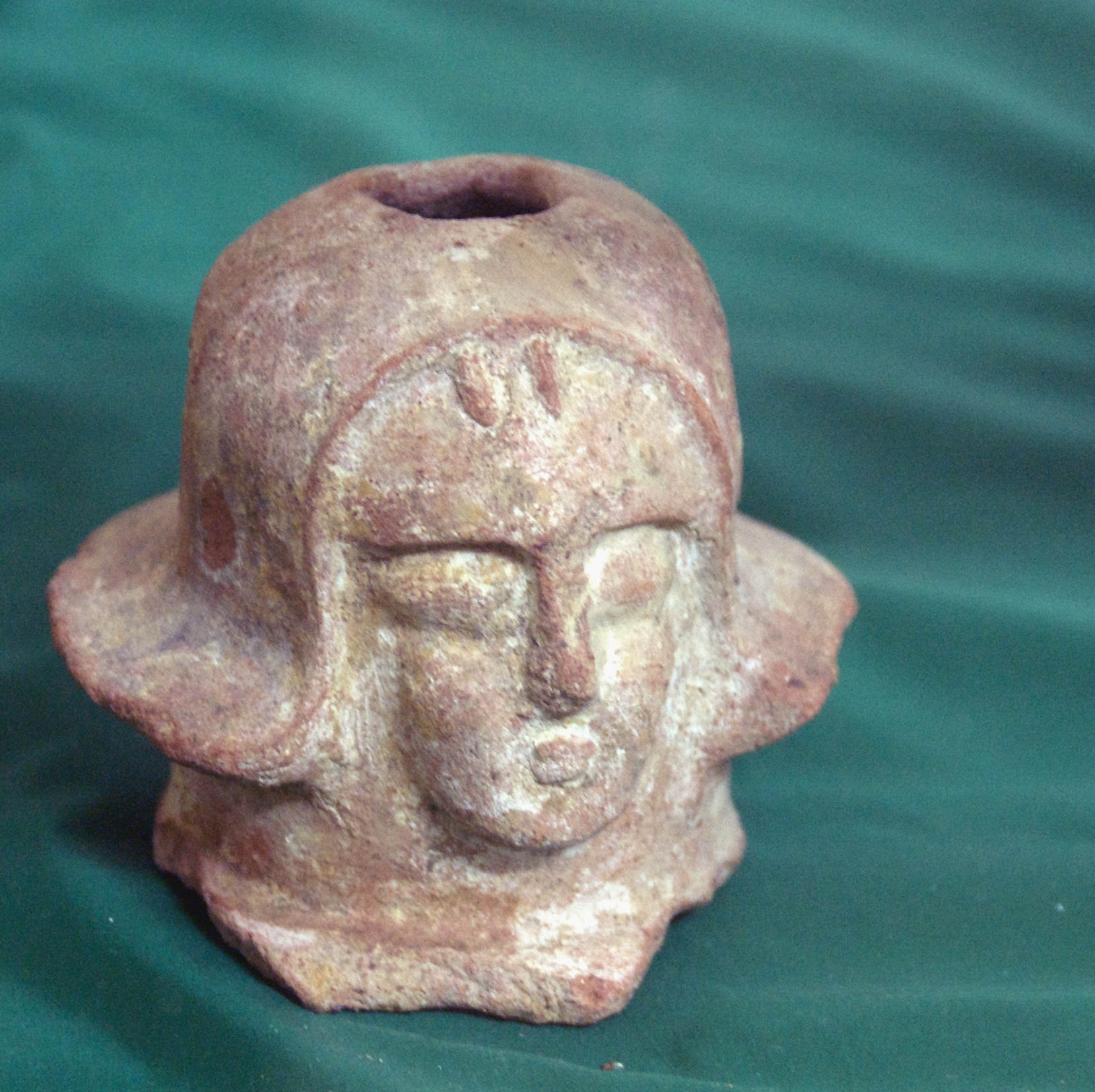
A jar spout from the ancient Kingdom of Aksum

Ethiopia has great ethnic and linguistic diversity, and styles in secular traditional crafts vary greatly in different parts of the country. There is a range of traditions in textiles, many with woven geometric decoration, although many types are also usually plain. Ethiopian church practices make a great deal of use of colourful textiles, and the more elaborate types are widely used as church vestments and as hangings, curtains, and wrappings in churches, although they have now largely been supplanted by Western fabrics. Examples of both types can be seen in the picture at the top of the article. Icons may normally be veiled with a semi-transparent or opaque cloth; very thin chiffon-type cotton cloth is a specialty of Ethiopia, though usually with no pattern.

Colourful basketry with a coiled construction is common in rural Ethiopia. The products have many uses, such as storing grains, seeds, and food and being used as tables and bowls. The Muslim city of Harar is well known for its high-quality basketry, and many craft products of the Muslim minority relate to wider Islamic decorative traditions.

=== Illuminated manuscripts from other religious groups of Ethiopia ===
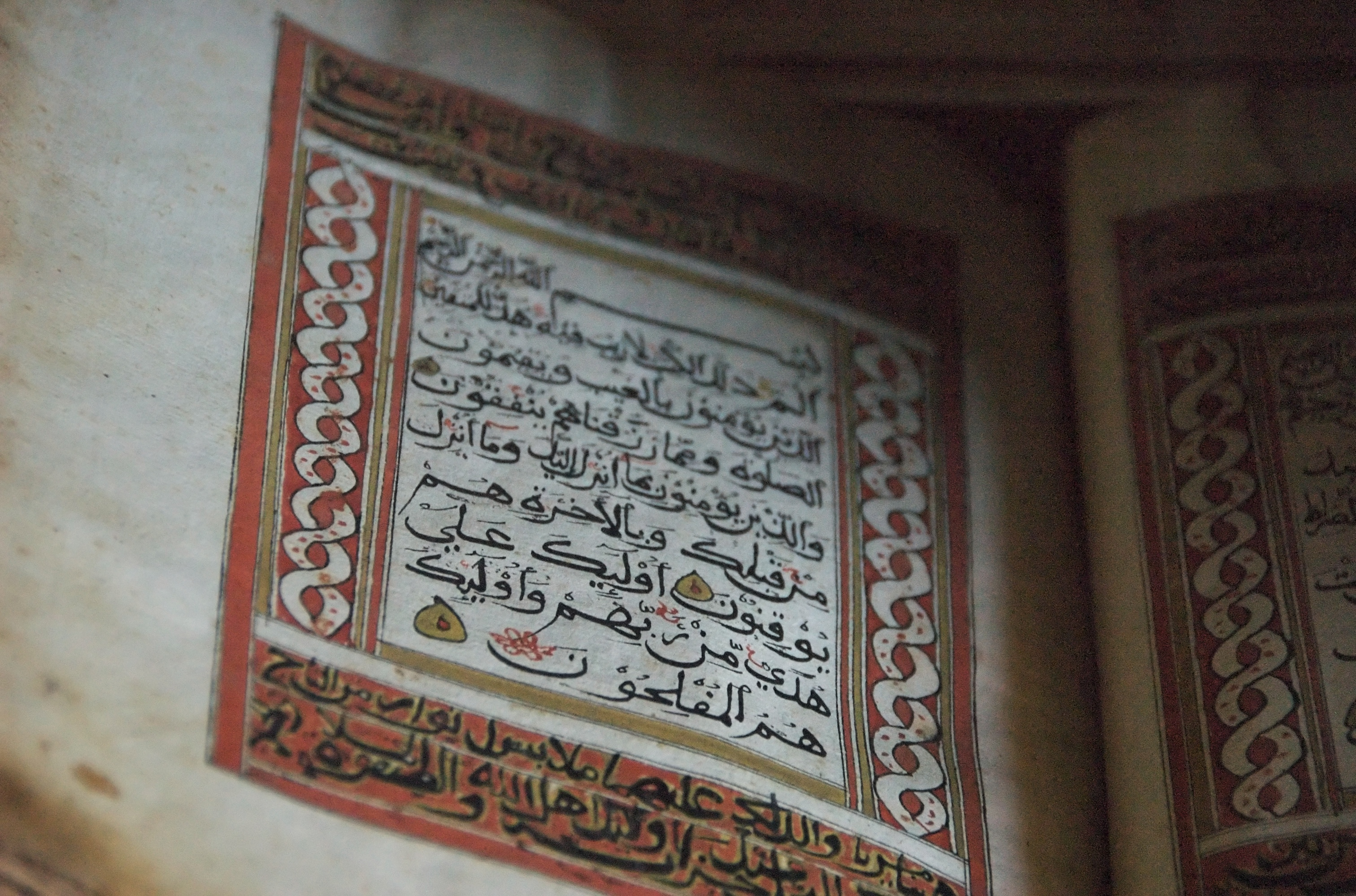
Islamic manuscript housed in the Governor of Harar's mansion

Basketry wasn't the only artistry to emerge from the Muslim city of Harar. While Christian illuminated manuscripts dominate the literature on religious texts emerging from this region, Ethiopia is also home to a rich history of Islamic illuminated manuscripts. Located in central-eastern Ethiopia at the crossroads of multiple migration and trade routes, Harar became the epicentre for Islamization by the 14th century. This followed previous introductions of the religion by Muslim religious figures in the northeast of the country in the 7th century, and coasts of neighboring Somalia in the 8th century. The confluence of culture from both nomadic groups indigenous to the region and trade partners beyond, resulted in a style of manuscript unique to the Harari people.

The Khalili manuscript (a single-volume Qur’ān of 290 folios) is regarded by scholar Dr. Sana Mirza as representative of distinct Harari codices (known in Arabic as Mus'haf). In part, because of its stylistic parallels to the 25 recorded collections produced in Harar. Additionally, because it is one of the earliest documented texts from the city—the oldest datable manuscript containing text in Old Harari was produced in 1460. The Khalili Qur’ān has distinct, wide horizontal margins, creating the optics of a script elongated across the page. The wide margins are filled with notes and ornate decorations. Some notes are written diagonally to the main text creating a vertical zigzagging effect, and others are written in blocking patterns. The colourful gray, gold, and red text serve both an aesthetic and functional purpose, each colour indicating a different reading of the text or sayings of the prophet.

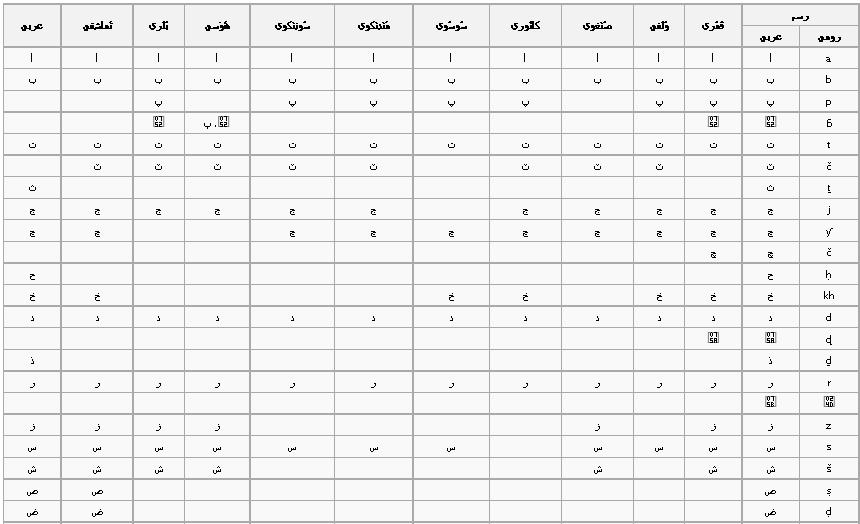
Table displaying some of the adaptations of Arabic script to Ajami script

==== Ajami Script and Ajamization of Ethiopian Art ====
The text itself is written in Ajami, differing from the native Ge'ez script—an alphabet used to write languages local to Ethiopia and Eritrea. Ajami refers to an adapted Arabic script influenced by local languages primarily spoken in Eastern Africa. Beyond the script, Ajami represents the contextual enrichment of Islamic traditions within the region during this period more broadly, a process growing literature on the subject refers to as Ajamization. With the introduction of Islamic texts, culture, and art to Africa, communities modified these traditions to accommodate local palates. The Ajamization of Qur’ānic texts by the Harari people, reflects this intersection of assimilation and preservation, through adapting traditional Islamic practices to indigenous culture and taste.

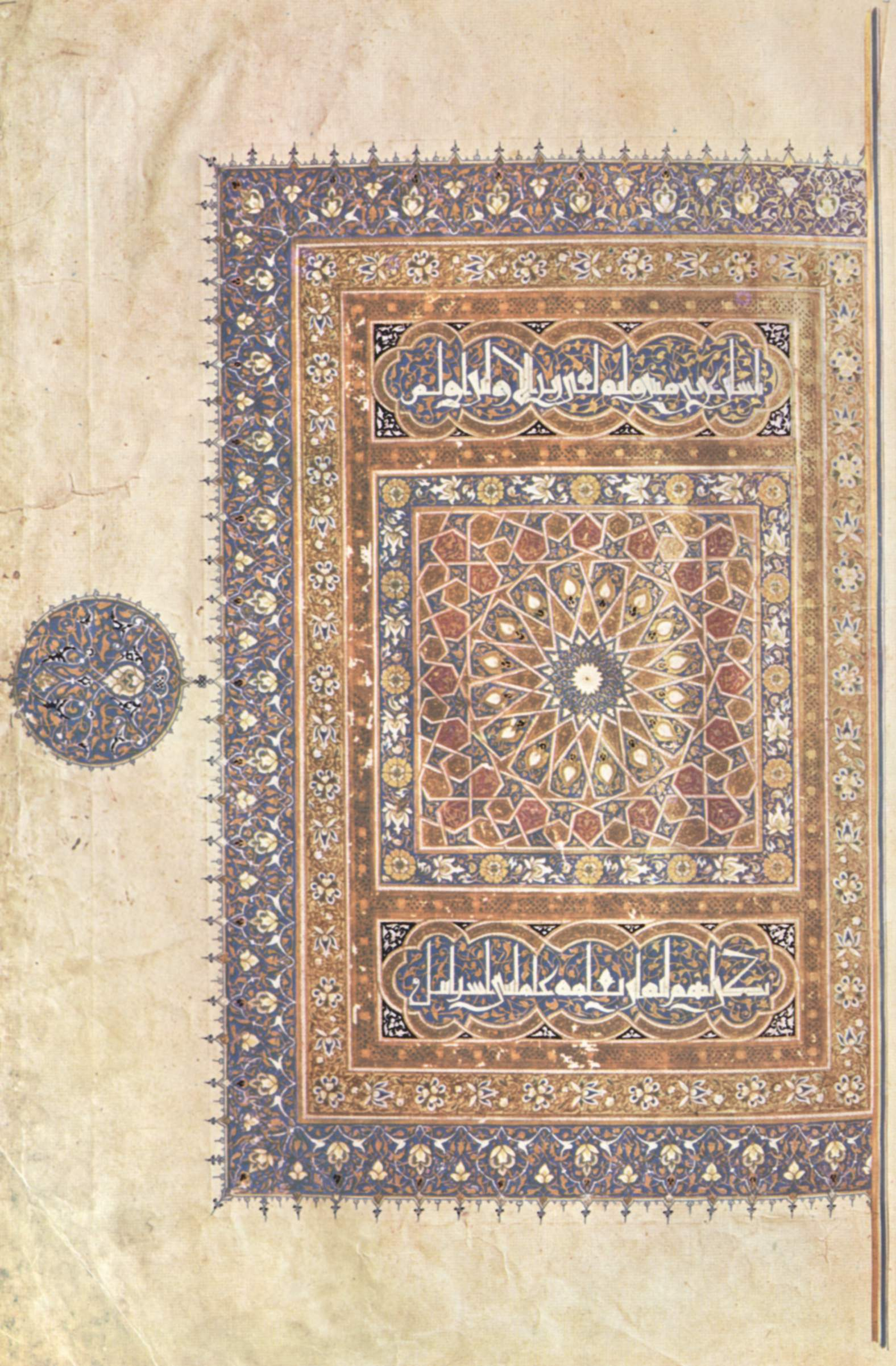
Qur'anic art of the Mamluk Sultanate circa 1375 with stylistic parallels to Harari manuscripts

==== Stylistic parallels ====
Transcultural parallels and adaptations in the illumination of the text, such as the Byzantine influence on Christian illustrations within the region, can also be observed in Islamic art. Beyond visual likeness to Byzantine art, Ethiopia's geographic positioning in the Horn of Africa at the junction of the Mediterranean, Red Sea, and the Indian Ocean is reflected in the aesthetic similarities between Harari script and other visual cultures. Notably, Dr. Mirza has drawn parallels between the Harari manuscripts and the decorative devices from the Islamic texts of the Mamluk Sultanate (modern-day Egypt and Syria) and the calligraphic letterform of the Biḥārī script (northeast India).

==== Representation of Ethiopian Islamic Art ====
The lack of representation for Islamic manuscripts compared to other religious texts from Ethiopia in mainstream scholarship can be attributed to a variety of reasons. A leading scholar in Islamic manuscript cultures in Sub-Saharan Africa, Dr. Alessandro Gori, ascribes this disproportionate representation within academia to a variety of socio-political factors. Dr. Gori claims that a change in regime in 1991 and the geopolitics of "classical" Arabic studies have contributed to an understudied field.

Research on Islam is also limited due to private ownership. The most prominent Ethiopian institutions to house these manuscripts include the Institute of Ethiopian Studies, the National Museum of Ethiopia, and the Harar National Museum. Yet, the majority of these collections remain in private hands. The emergence of tourism in the 1970s brought foreign buyers with little knowledge of the historical relevance of these bodies of work. This privatization made it easier for collectors from Europe, the United States, and Arab countries to acquire these texts without going through institutional channels. In conjunction with the destruction of manuscripts by foreign aggressors or disputing citizens, lack of trust in government bodies, and smuggling; cataloging and preserving these sacred texts remains a difficult task.

Despite these challenges, academics, curators, and the Ethiopian government have made increasing efforts to inventory Harari and other Islamic manuscripts. In collaboration with the Institute of Ethiopian Studies, Dr. Gori published a catalog of Islamic codices in 2014 to help facilitate future research on these manuscripts.

== Gallery ==
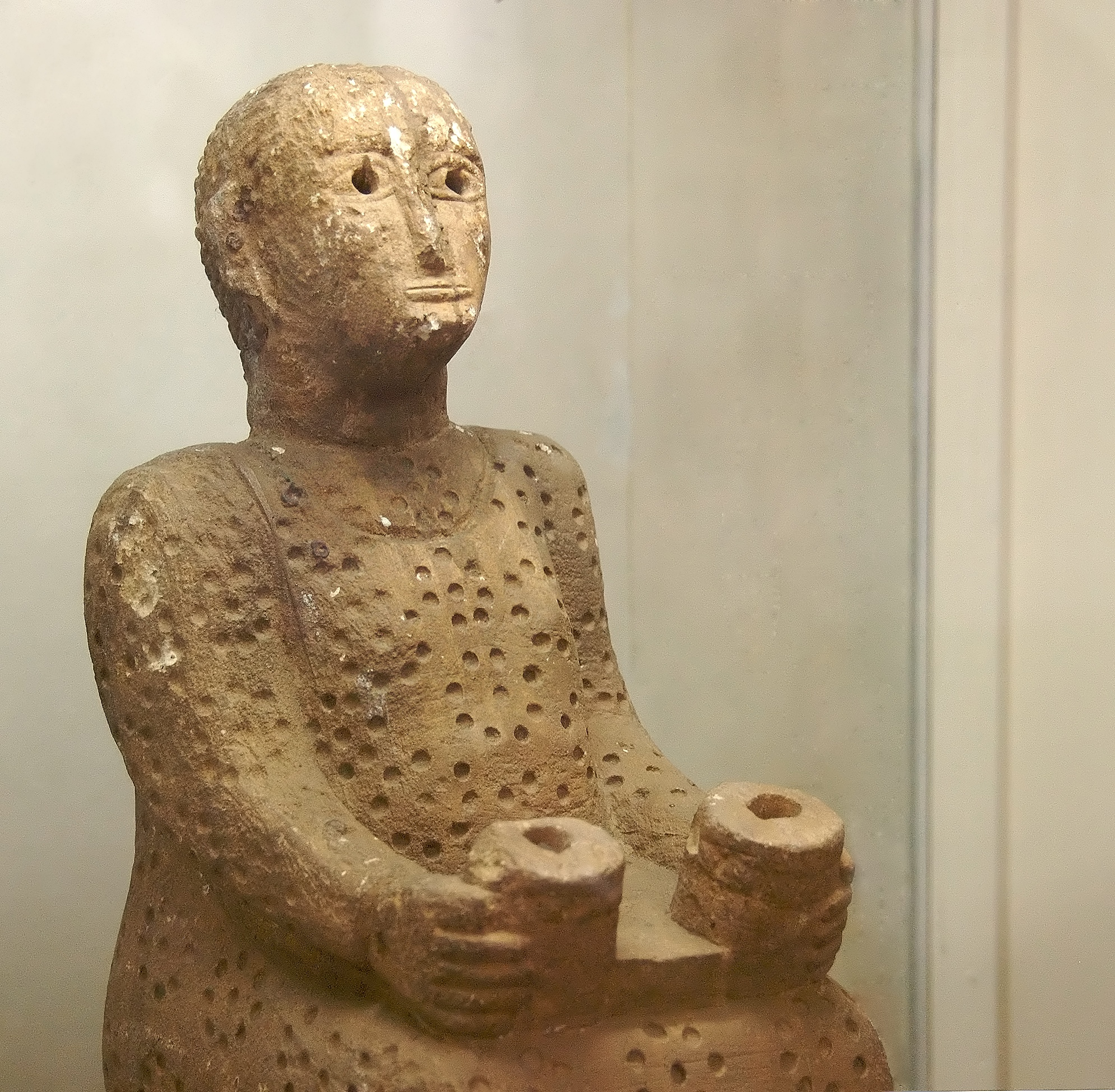
Stone statue from Addi-Galamo, Tigray Province, 6th - 5th century BCE

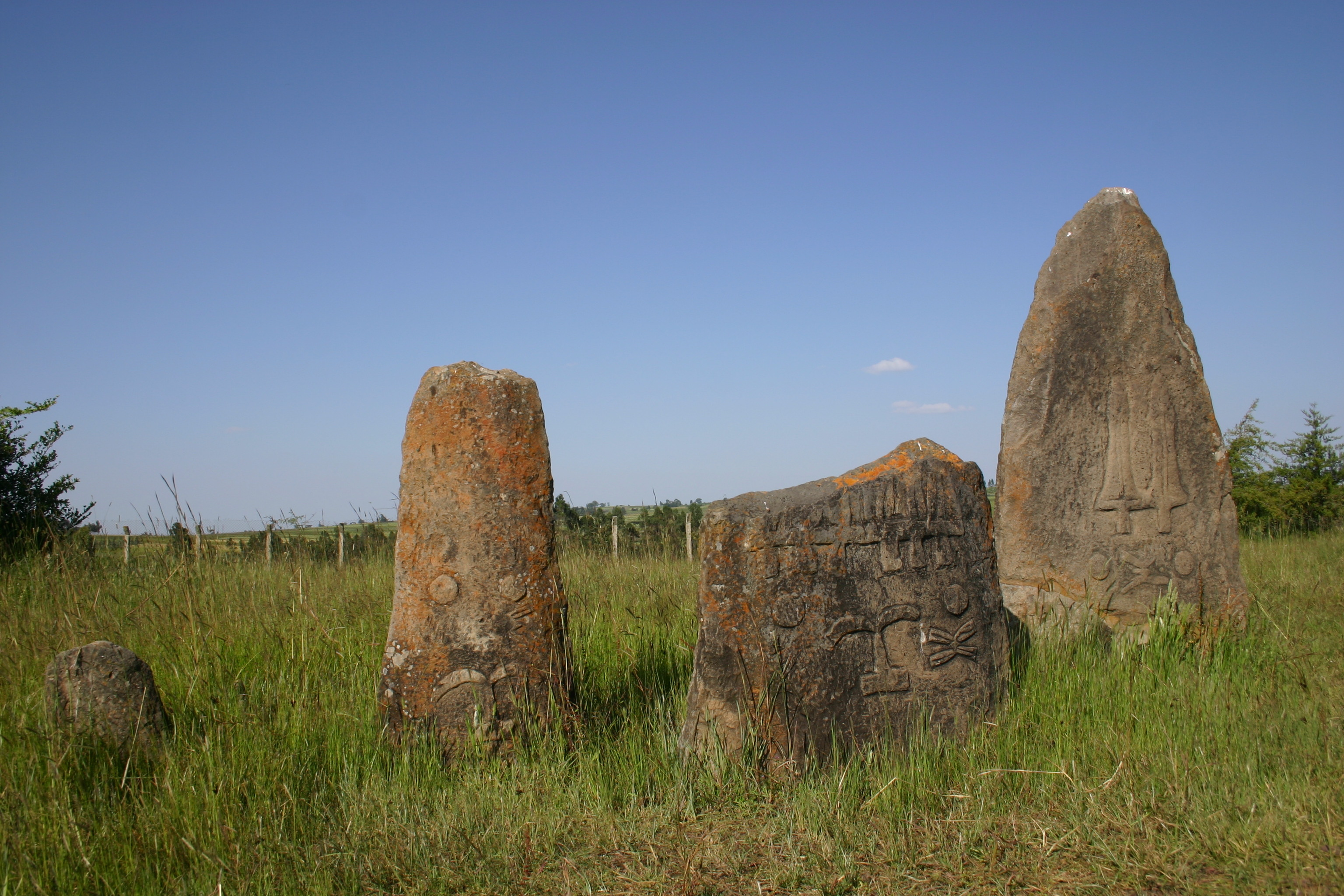
Stelae in the royal cemetery at Tiya

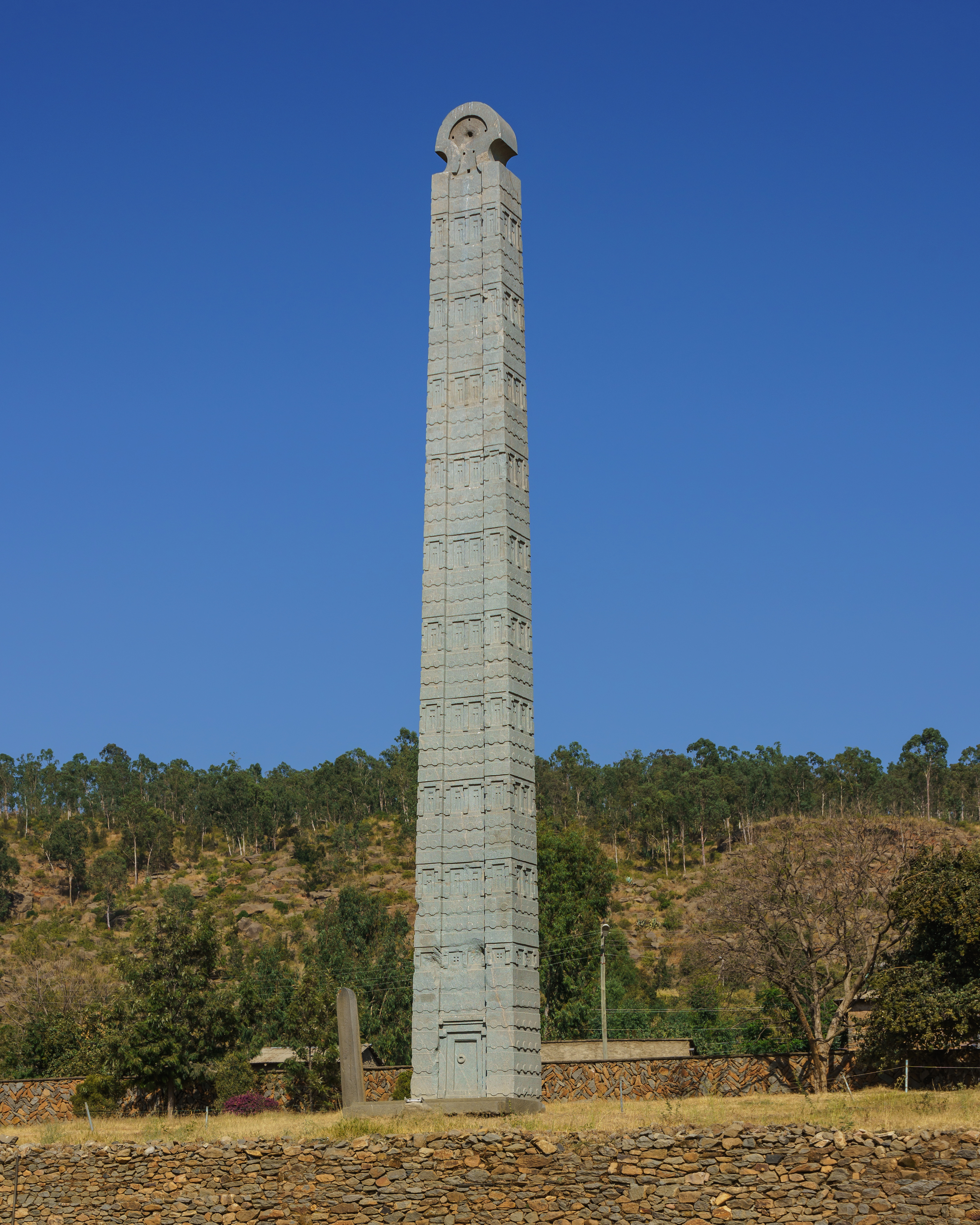
The Obelisk of Axum, 4th century

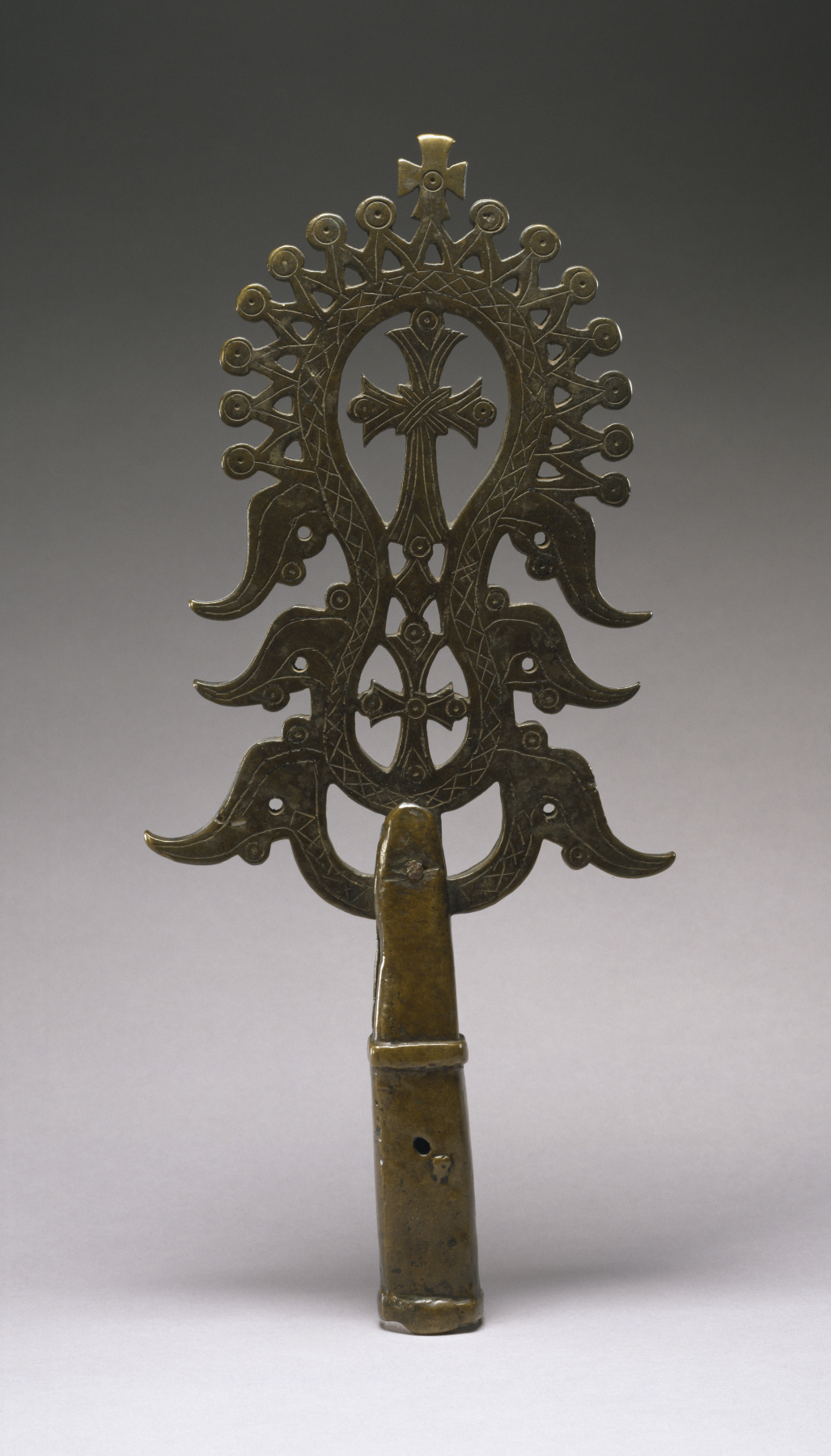
12th-century processional cross

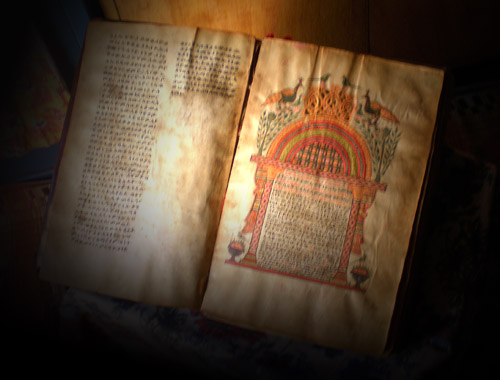
Bible from a monastery on Lake Tana, 12th-13th century

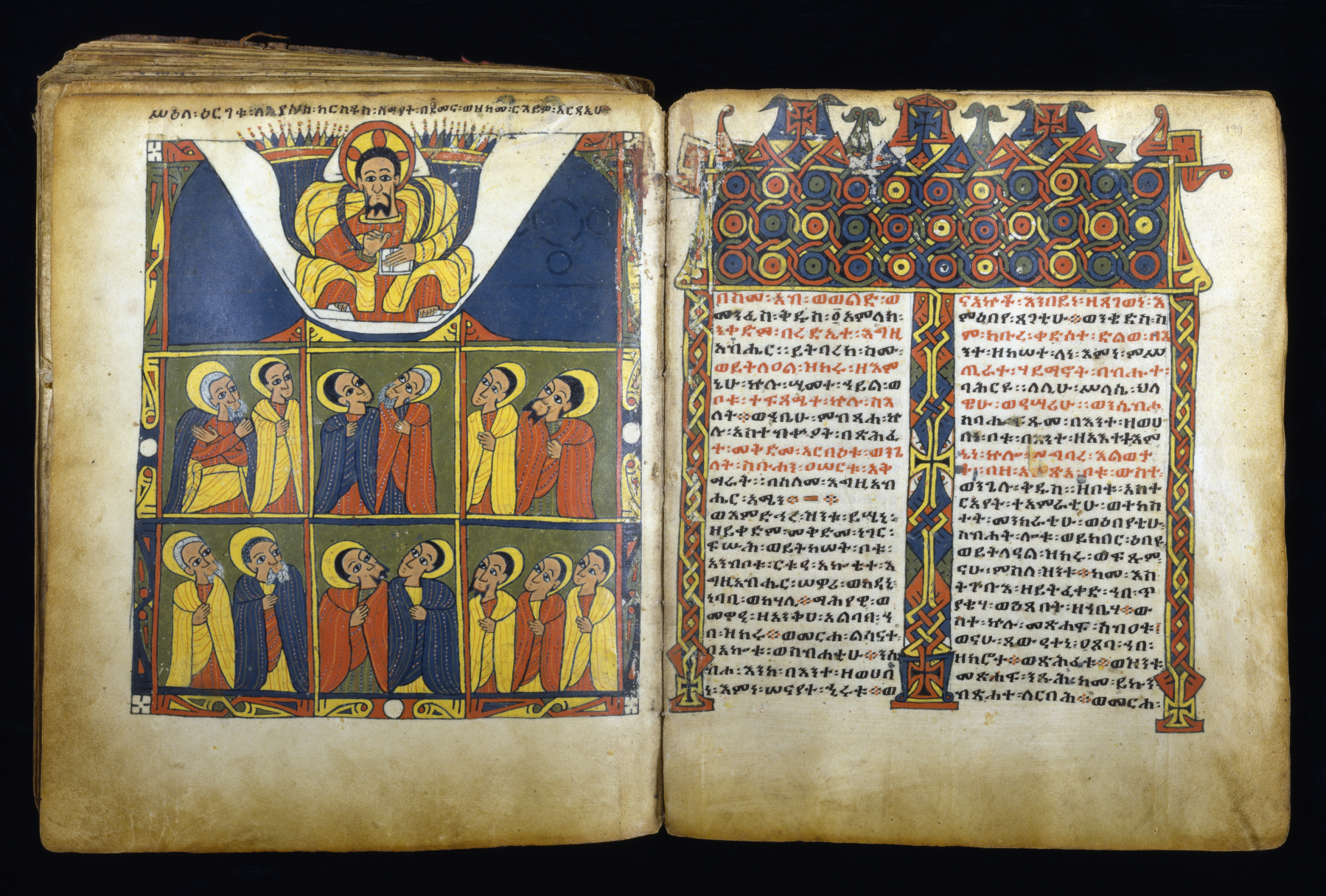
Page from Gunda Gunde Gospel, c. 1540

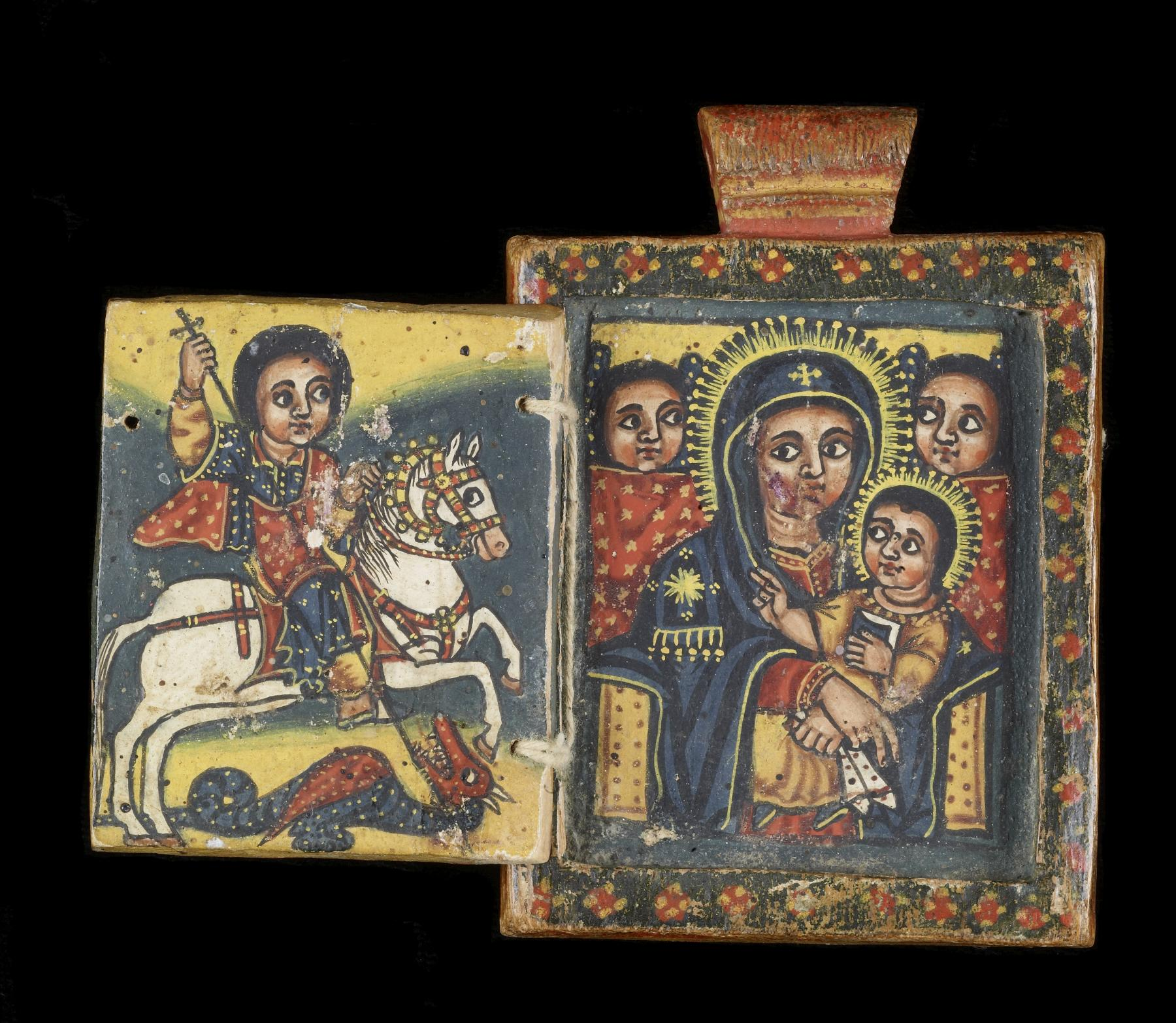
Small pendant diptych icon with St George and the Virgin and Child, late 18th century

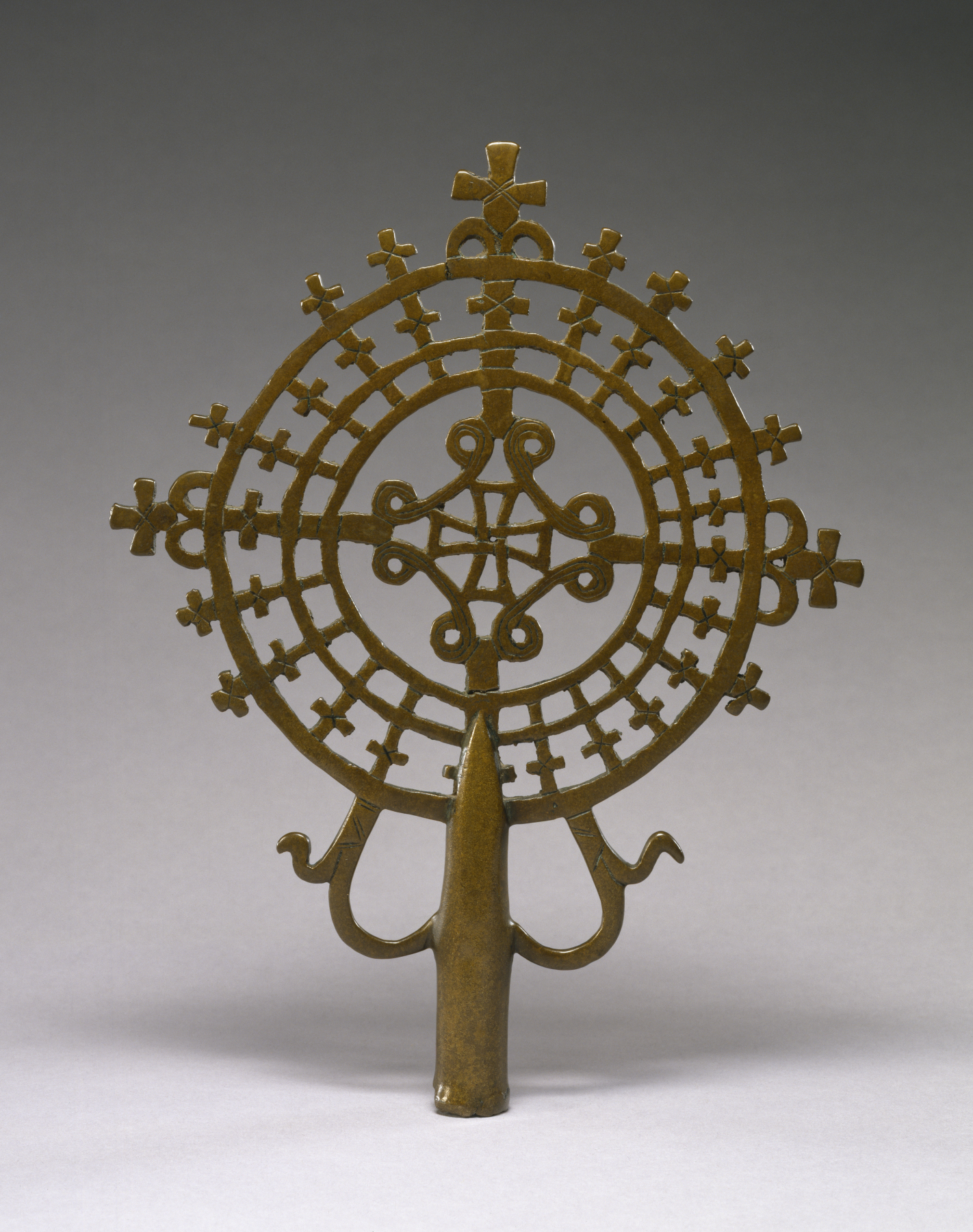
Processional cross

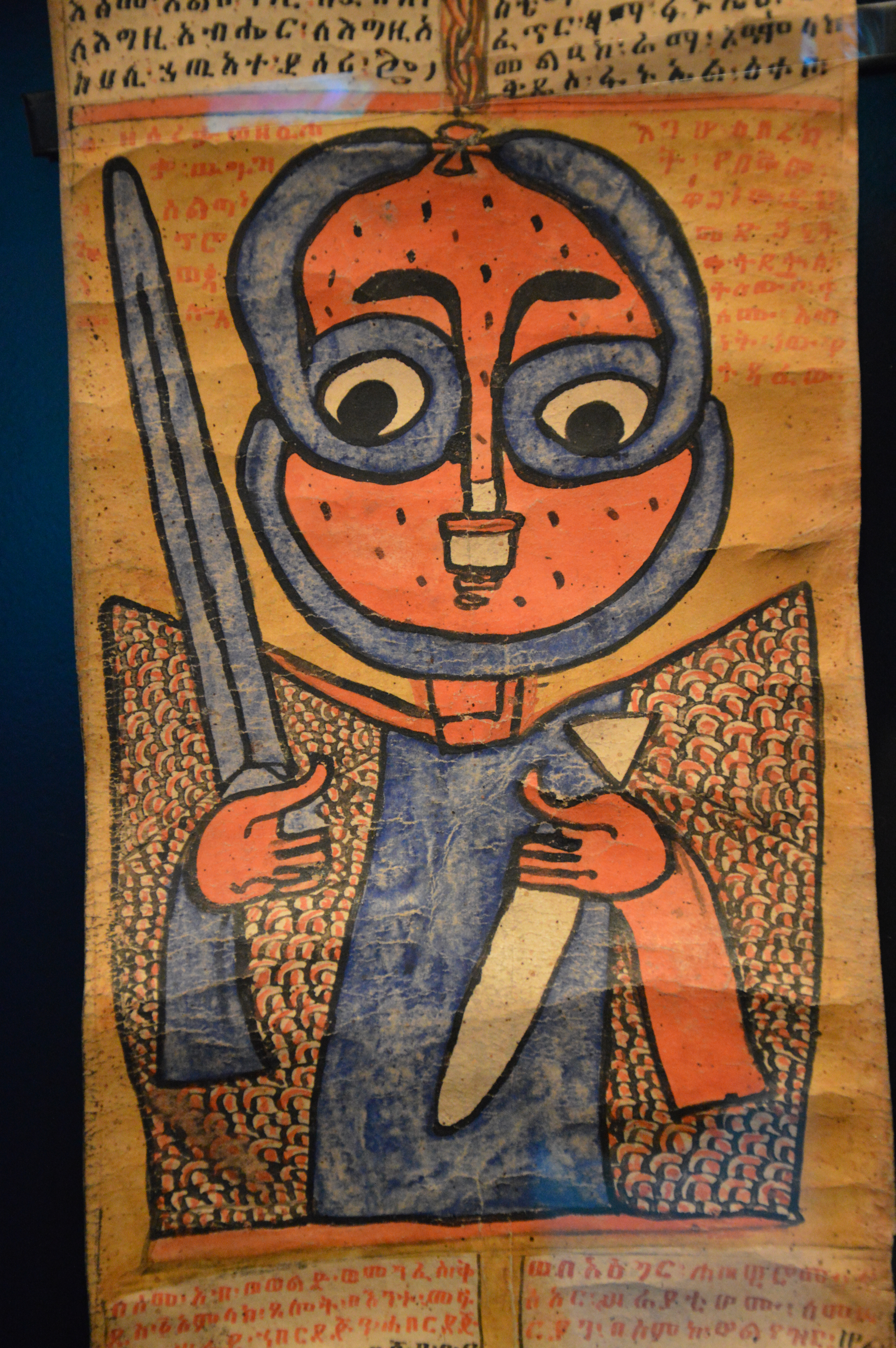
Guardian angel, around 1800

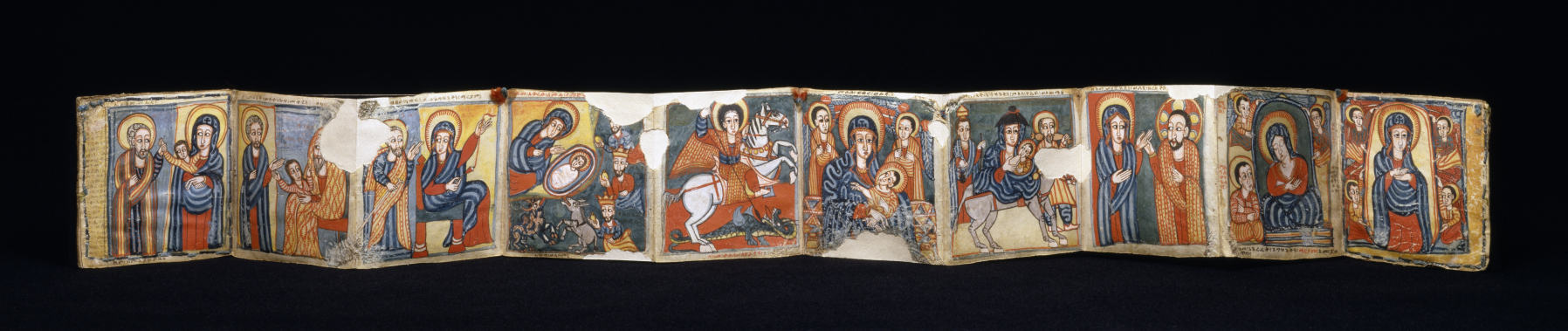
Folding book

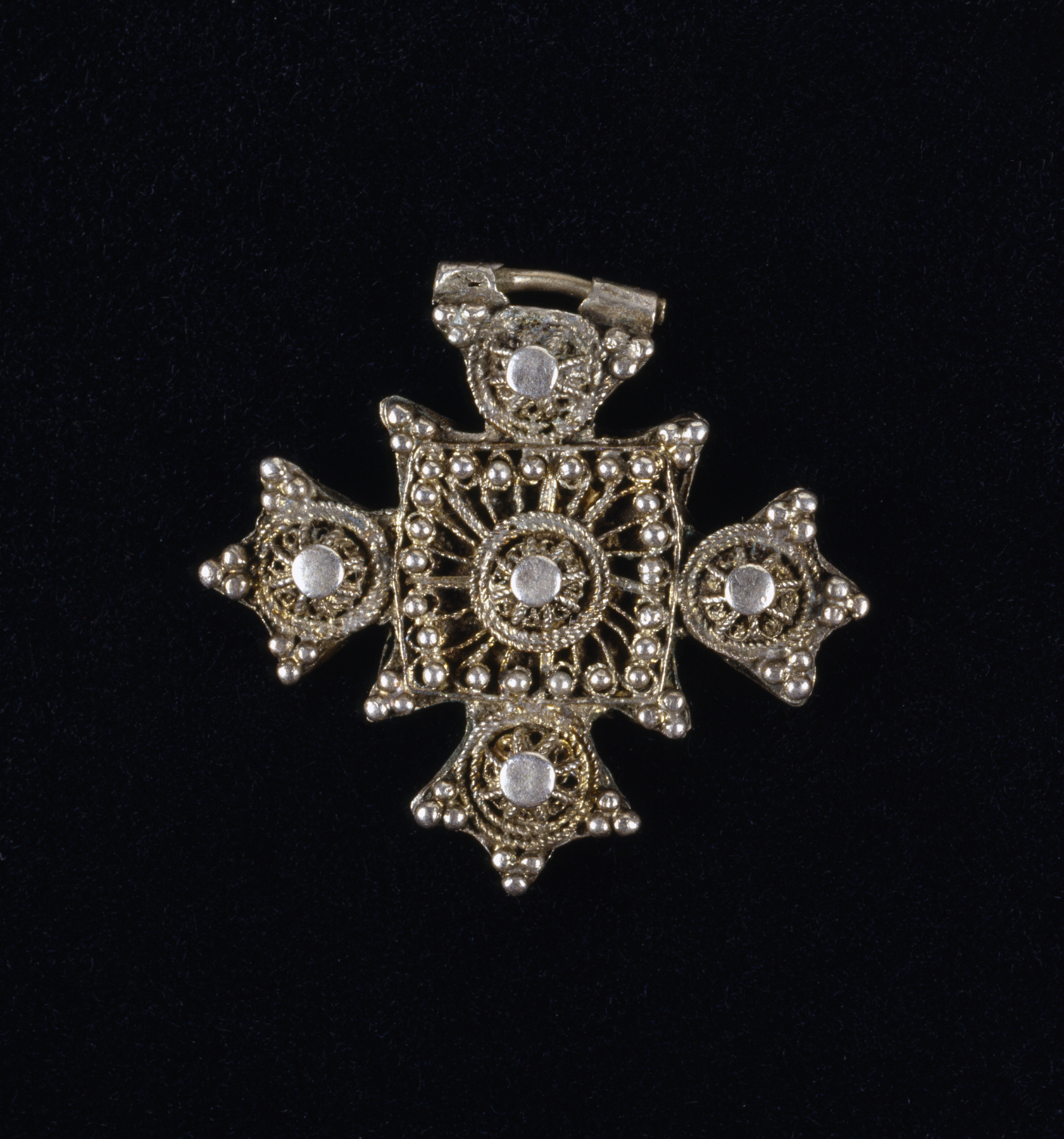
19th-century pendant cross

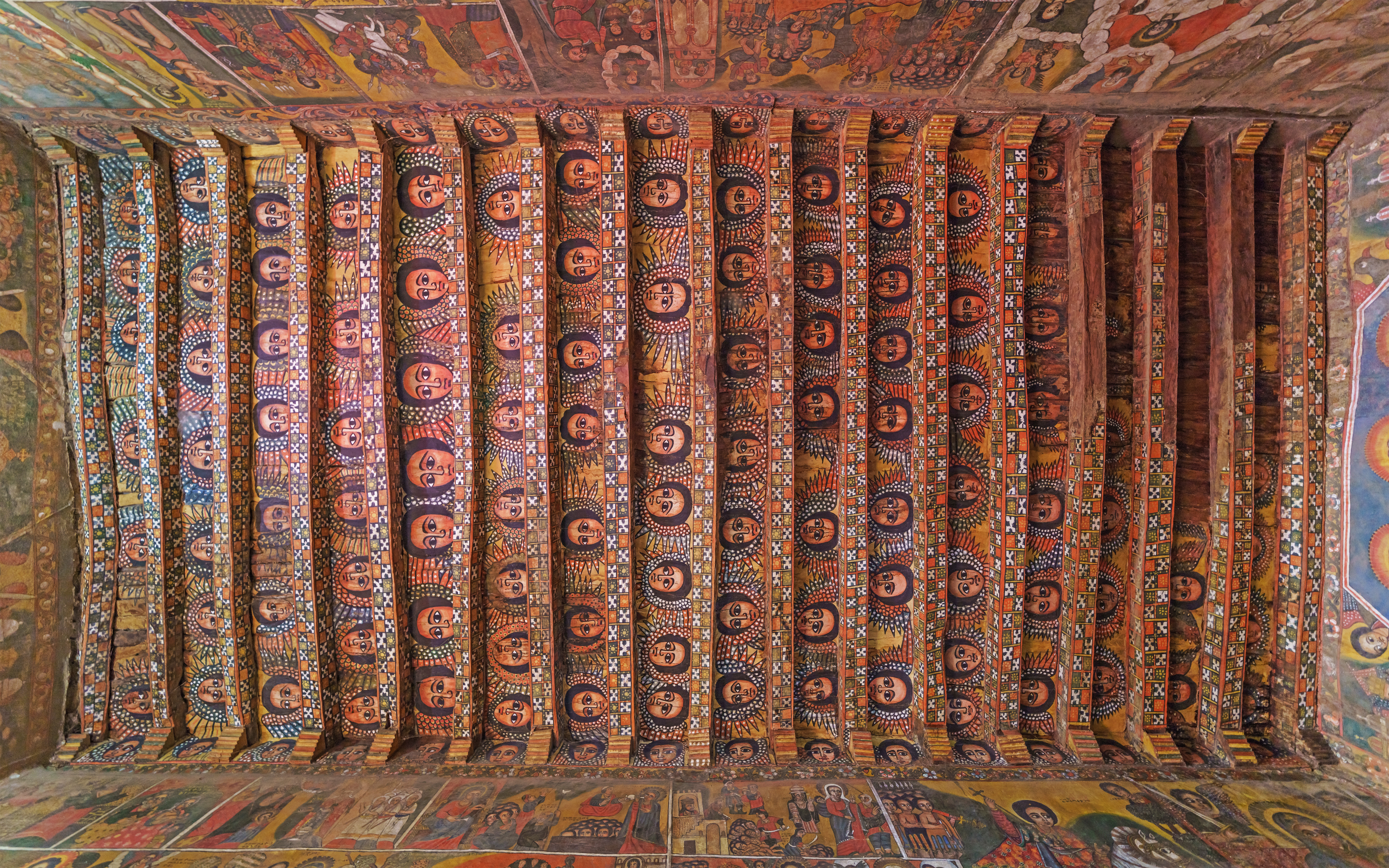
The roof of Debre Berhan Selassie church

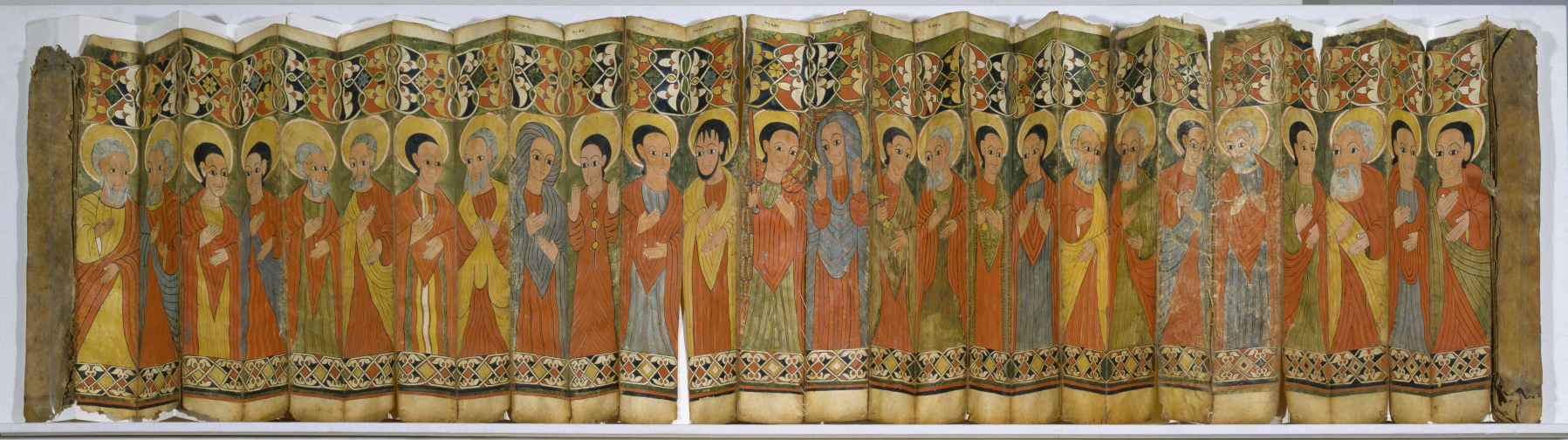
Folding Processional Icon in the Shape of a Fan

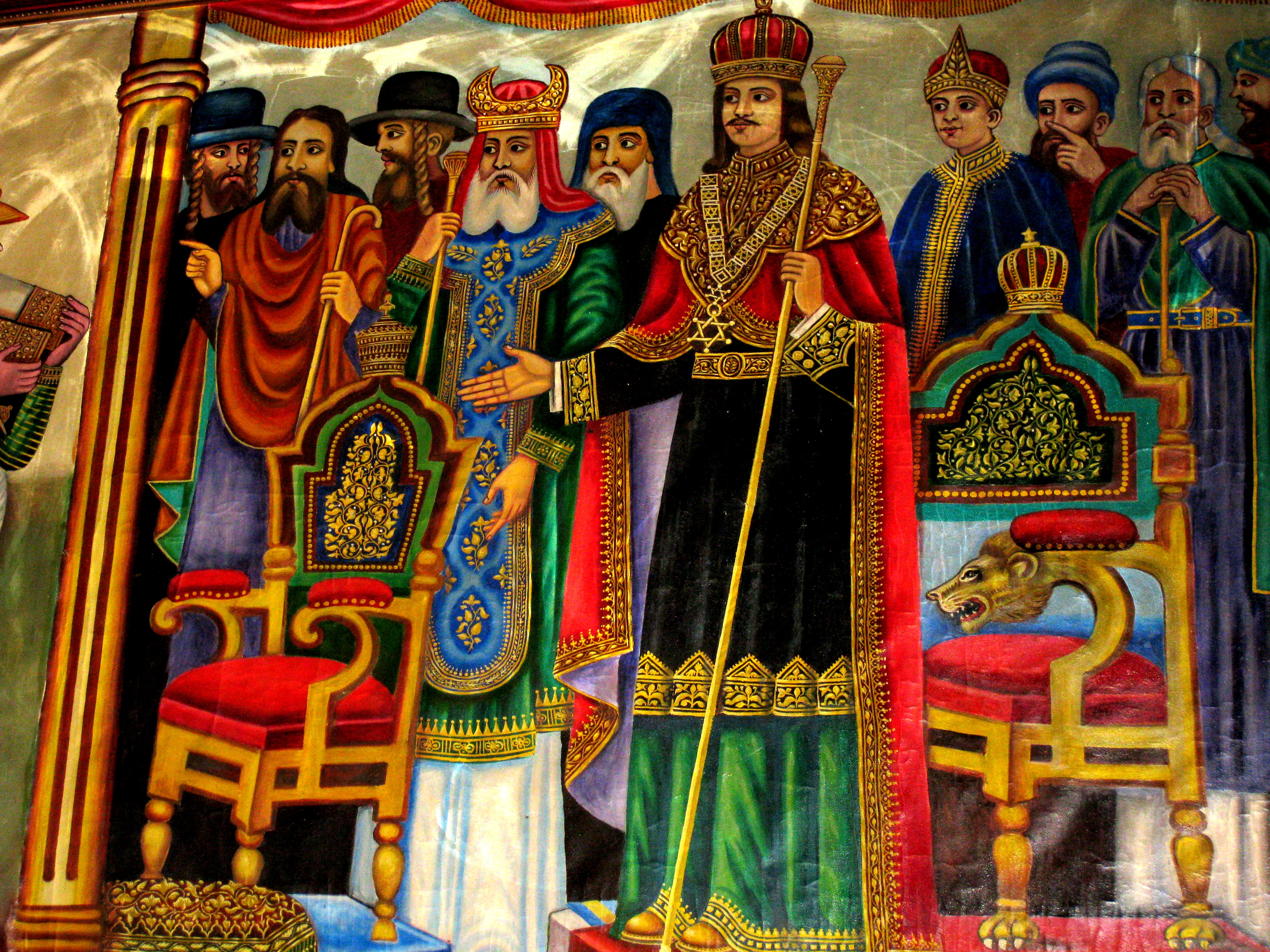
Painting of Solomon, Ethiopian Chapel in the Church of the Holy Sepulchre

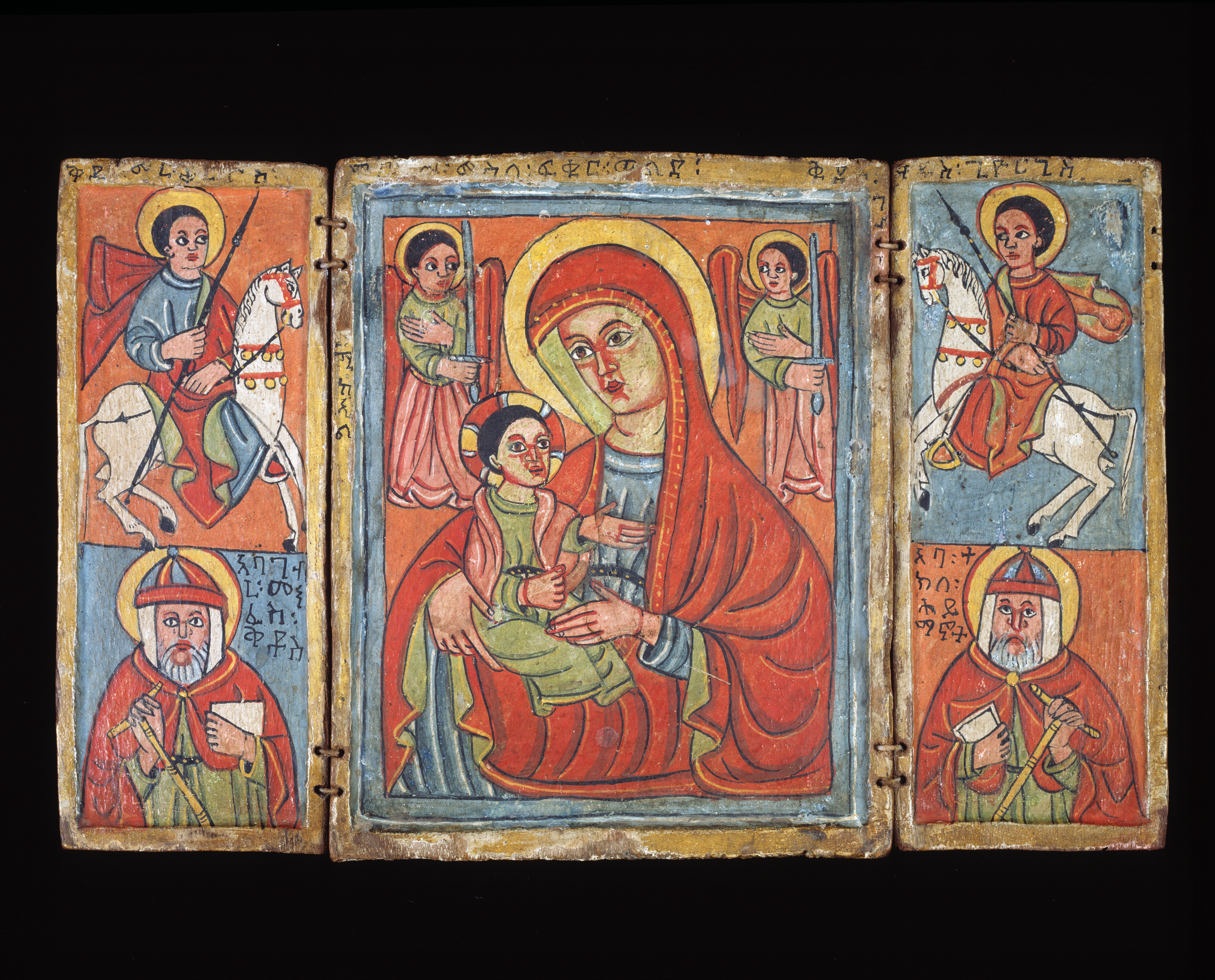
Mary with Child, Ethiopian, Early 16th century

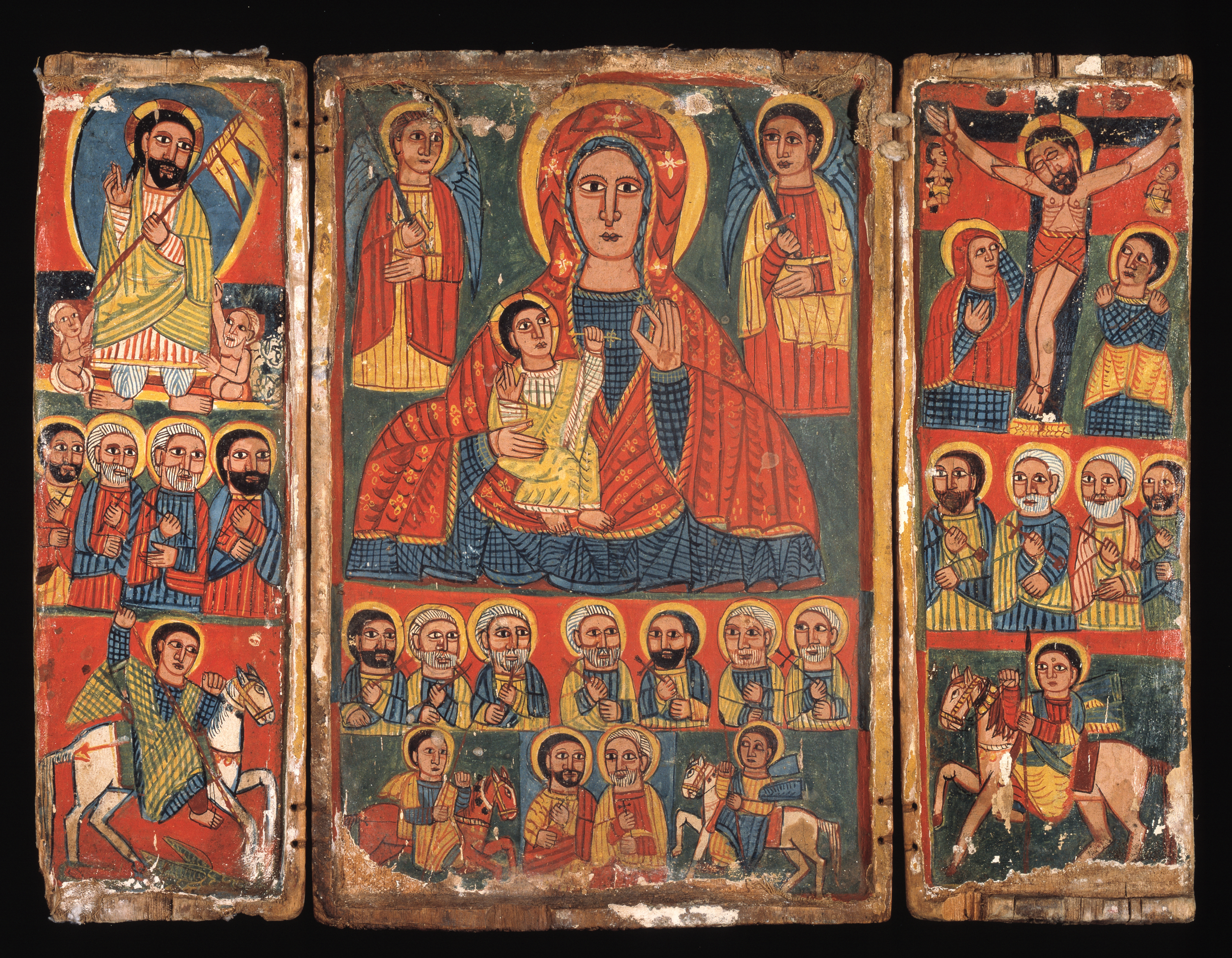
Ethiopian Orthodox Icon, Early 16th century

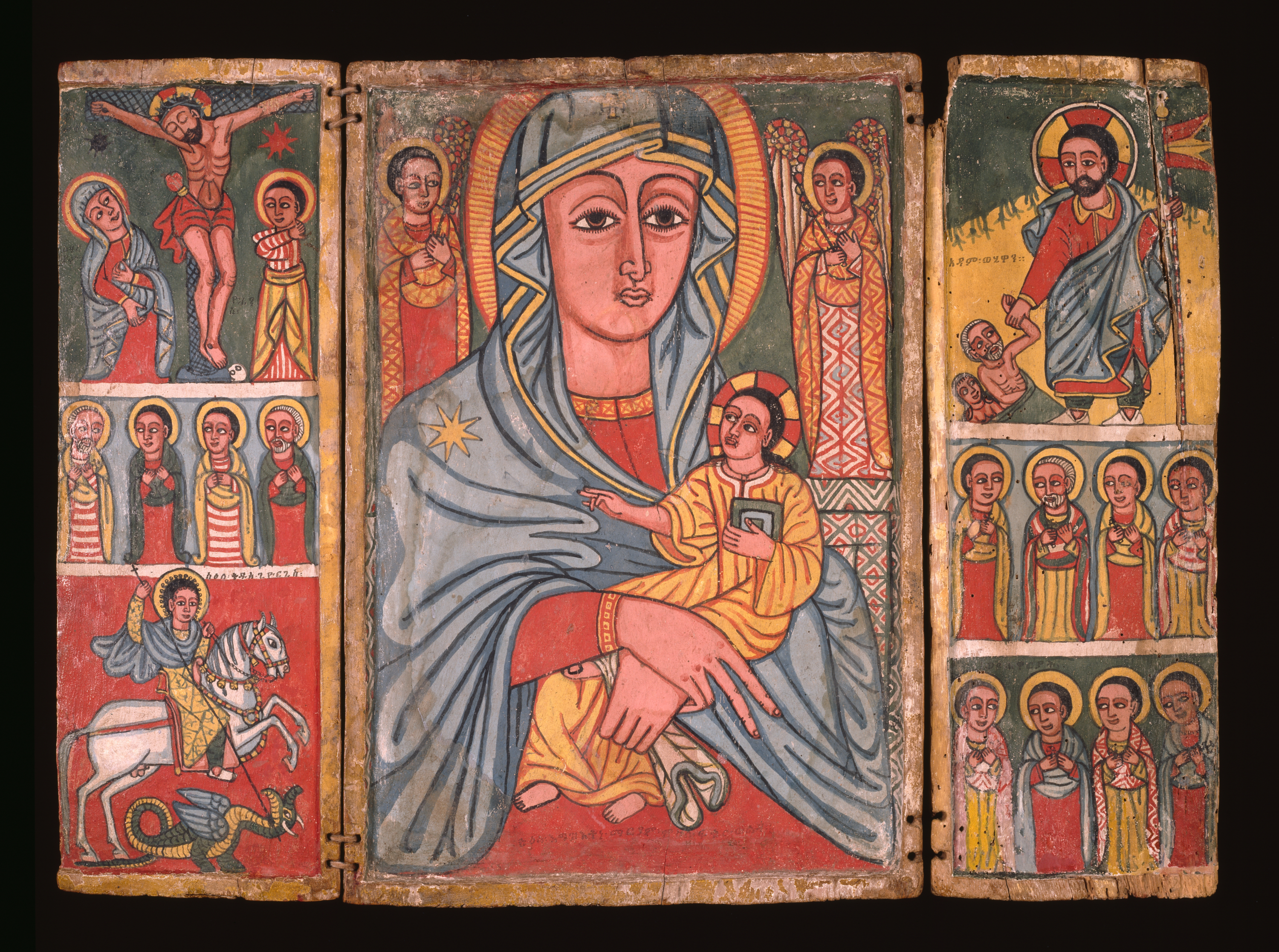
Ethiopian Orthodox Icon, Late 17th-early 18th century

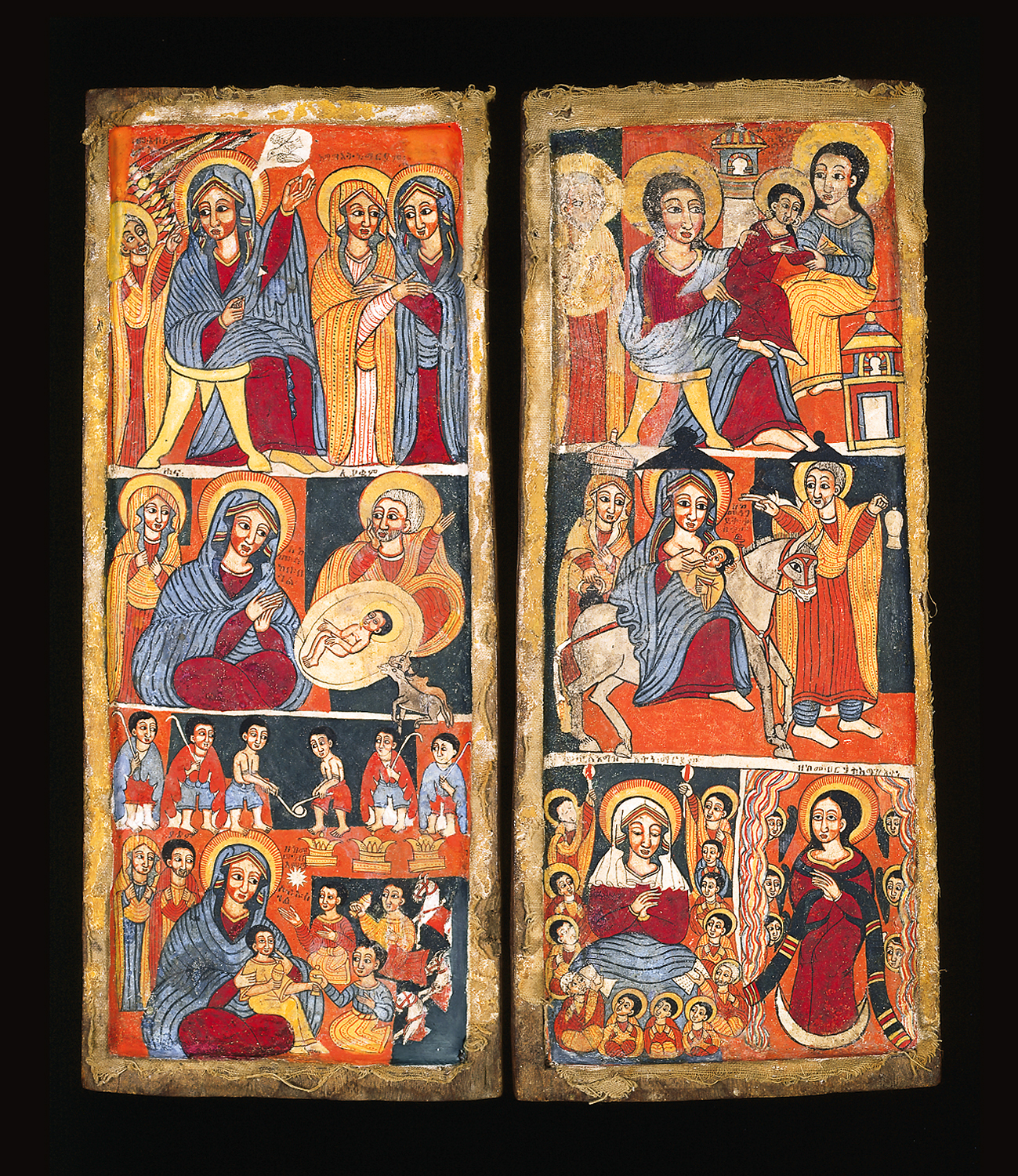
Marian Scenes, c.a. 1630-1700

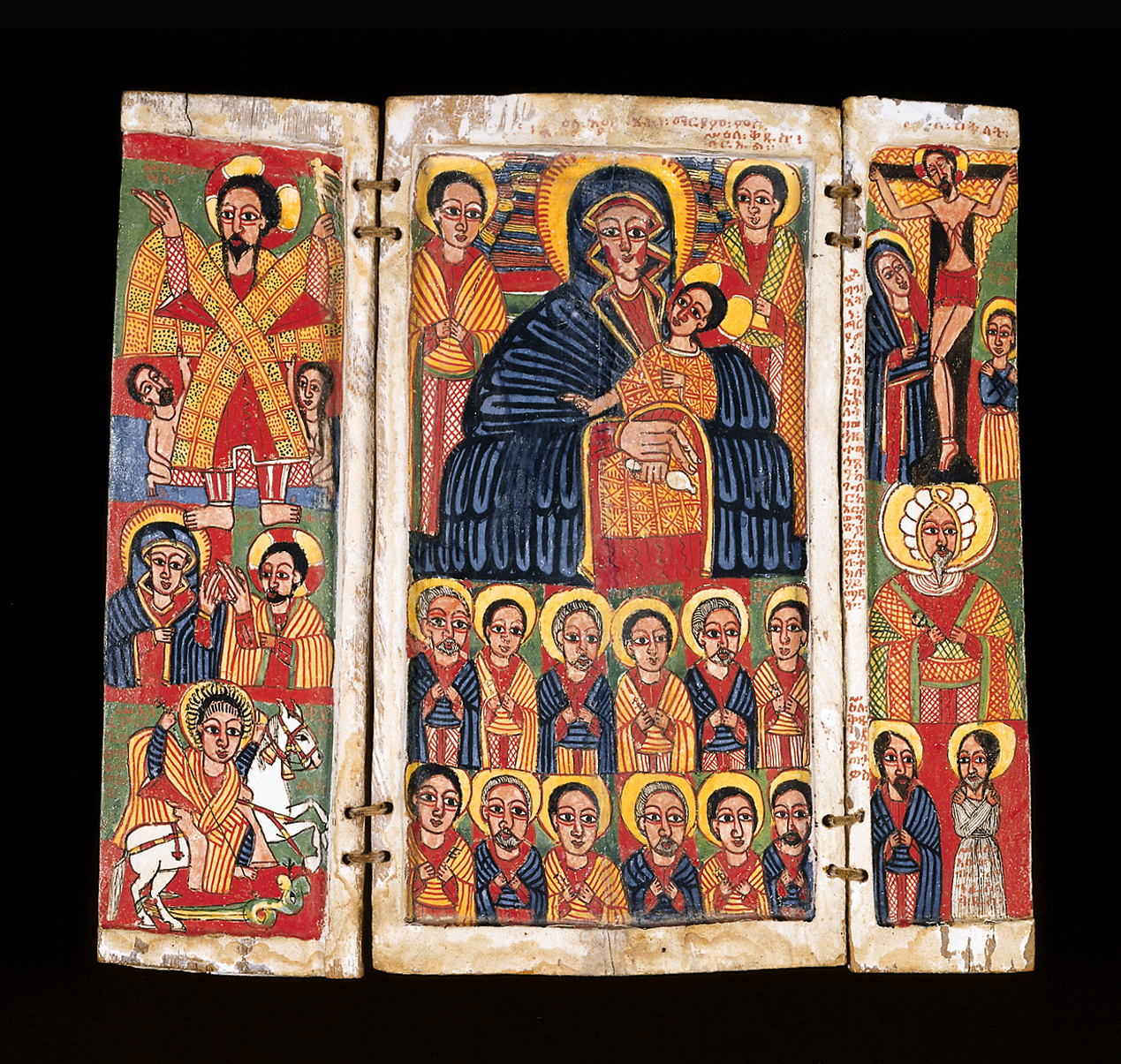
Mary with Child, Mid-late 17th century

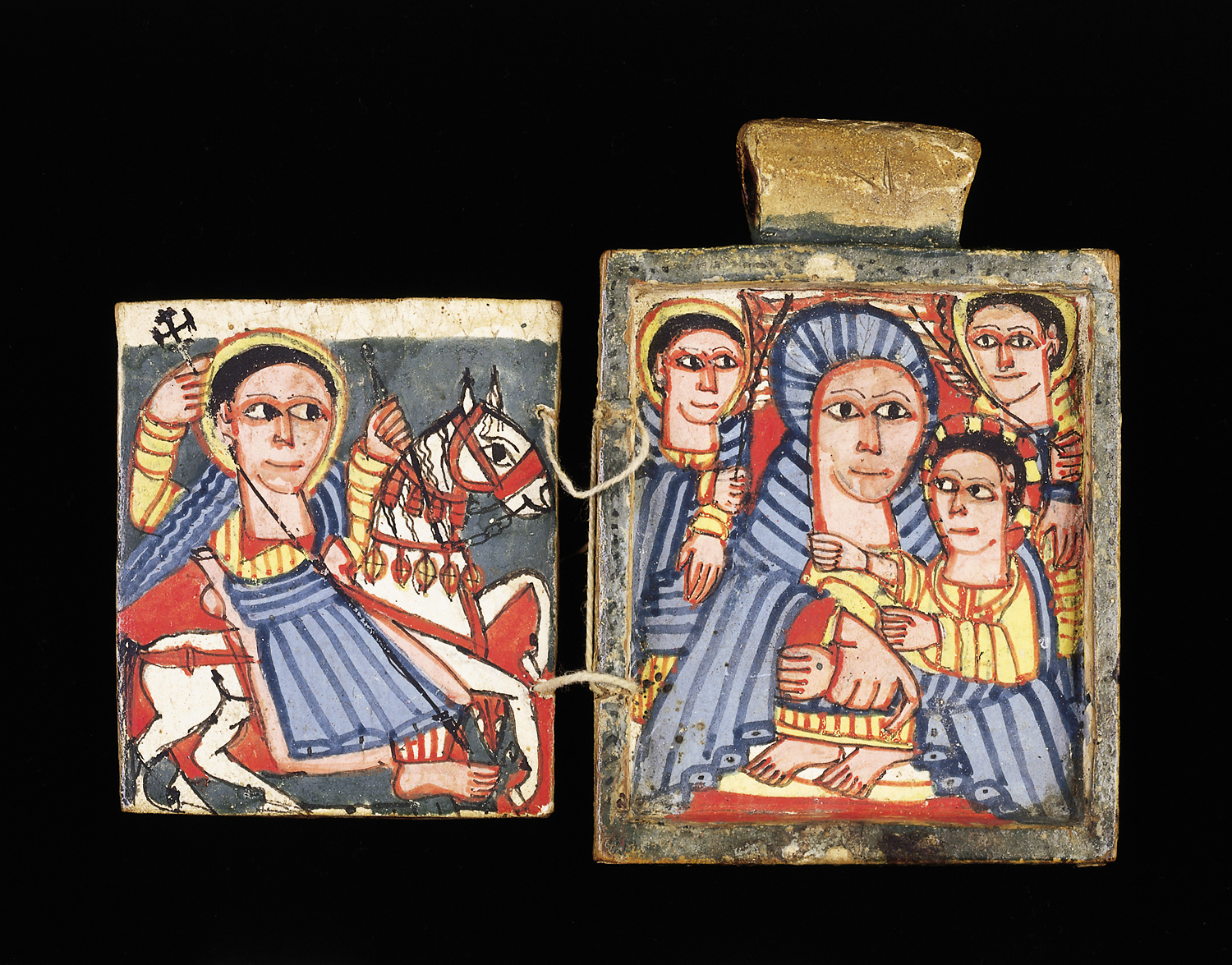
Pendant Icon, Mary with Child and St. George, 17th century

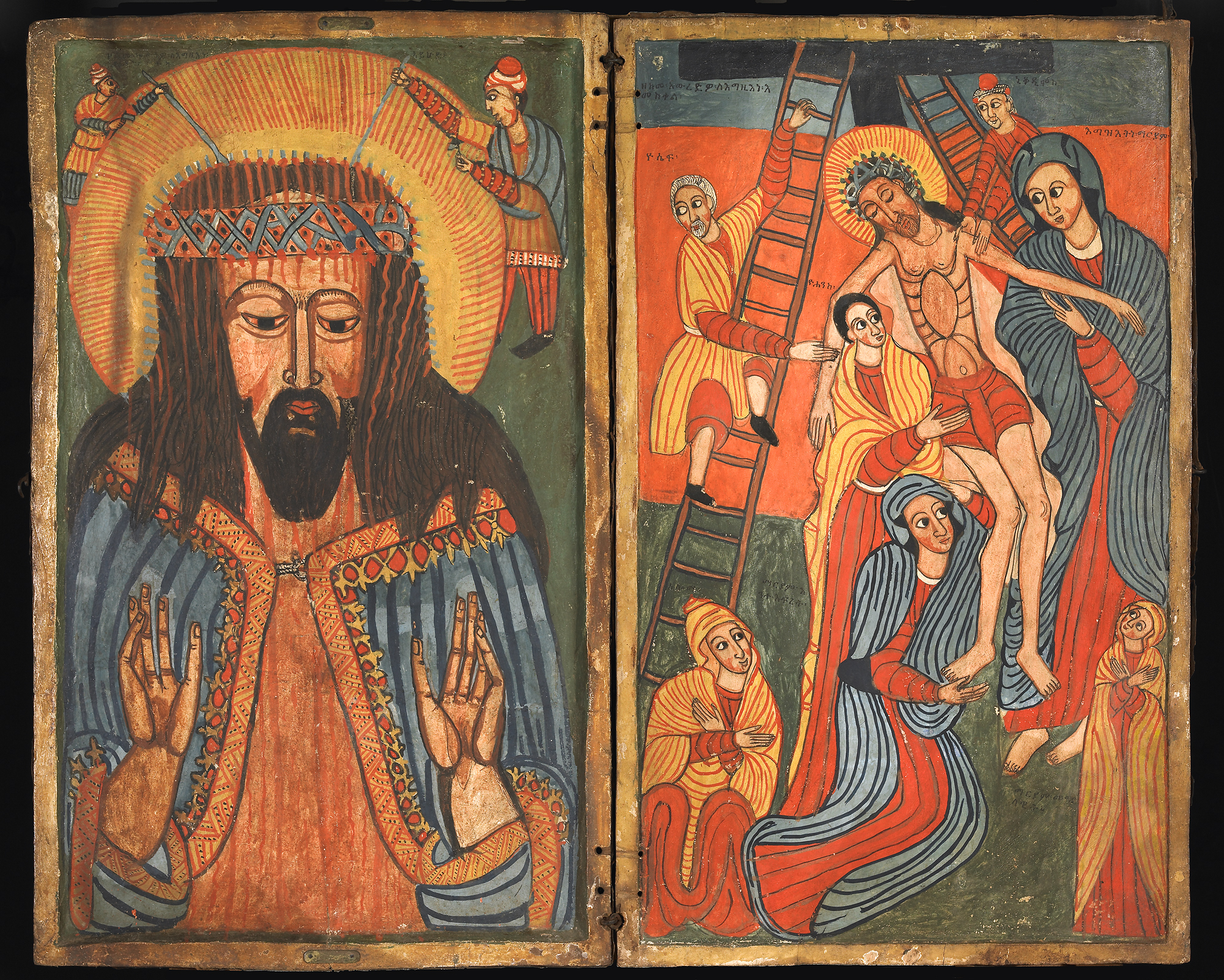
Diptych: Christ crowned with thorns; descent from the Cross (c.a. 1750)

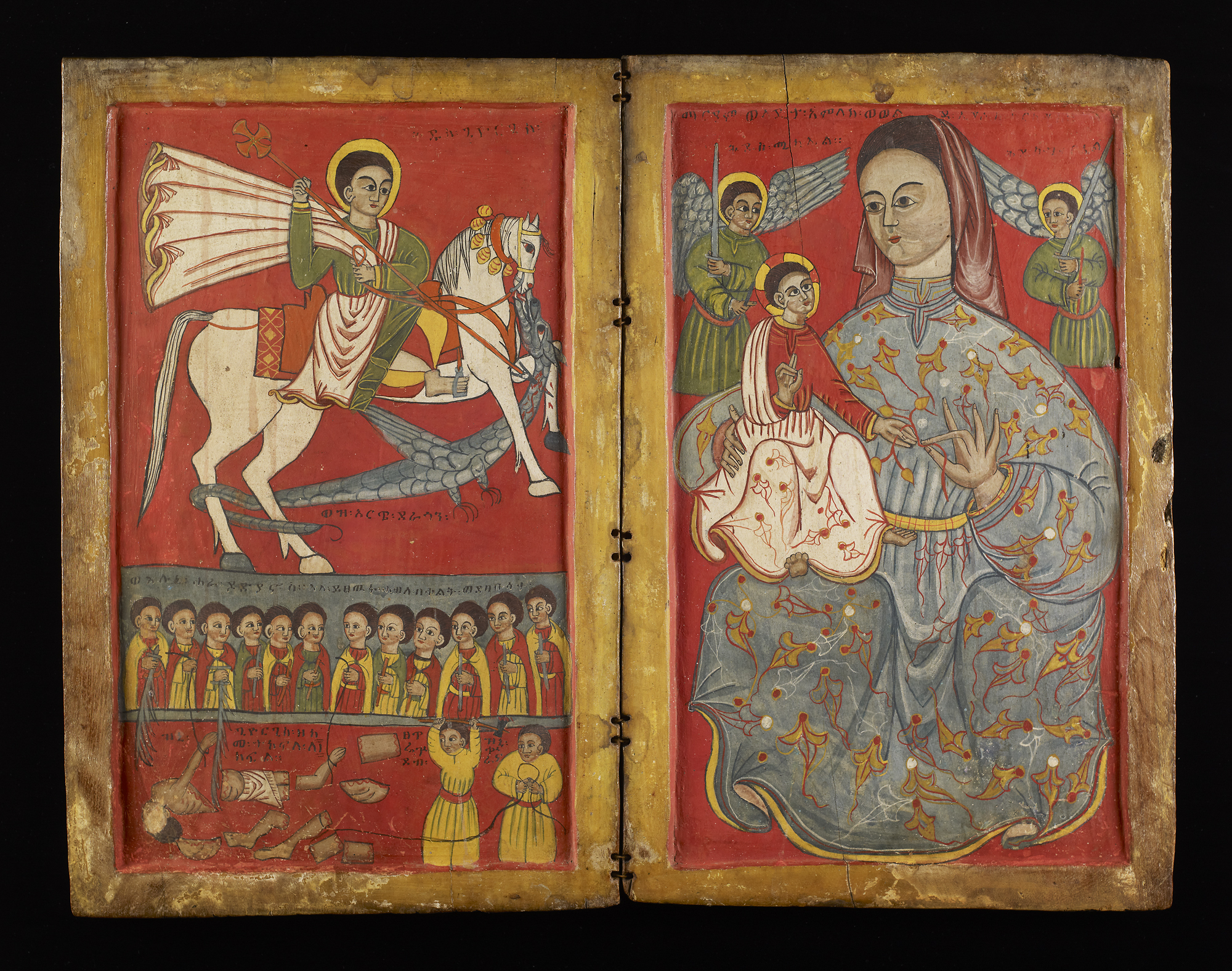
Mary with Child, and St. George (15th-16th century)

== See also ==
- Architecture of Ethiopia
- List of Ethiopian artists
