= Eyerusalem Jiregna =

Ethiopian photographer

Eyerusalem jirenga
- Born: 1993 (age 32–33)
- Citizenship: Ethiopia
- Education: University in the United states
- Occupation: Photojournalists
- Known for: Photos of the local women of Harar

Eyerusalem Jiregna (born 1993) is an Ethiopian photographer.

== Career ==
She is based in Addis Ababa and focuses on women doing non traditionally female jobs. She is known for her photos of the local women of Harar.

Jiregna attended university in the United States where she took a course on photography. She worked as a photojournalist when she returned to Ethiopia and started her own photography business. She also trained as a fashion designer. As a result, her work often focuses on fabric. Jiregna wants to portray Ethiopia as it is to the rest of the world. She has exhibited in Addis Fine Art Gallery.

== Exhibitions ==
- Photoville, 2016
- Africa Contemporary African Art Fair, 2017
- Investec Cape Town Art Fair, 2018
- Refraction: New Photography of Africa and its Diaspora, Steven Kasher Gallery, New York City, 2018
- FNB Joburg Art Fair, 2018
