= Lemma Guya =

Ethiopian artist (1928–2020)

- Lammaa Guyyaa
- Born: 13 February 1928; Ada'a, Shewa Province, Ethiopian Empire (now Oromia Region, Ethiopia)
- Died: 26 October 2020 (aged 92); Addis Ababa, Ethiopia
- Burial place: Dellu, Bishoftu, Oromia Region, Ethiopia
- Occupations: Painter; airplane operator; author
- Years active: 1951–2018
- Notable work: Kuwanta; Mother Oromiya; Odaa
- Spouse: Aster Bekele
- Parent(s): Obbo. Guya Gemeda; Aadde. Mare Gobena

Lemma Guya Gemeda (Oromo: Lammaa Guyyaa Gammadaa; 13 February 1928 – 26 October 2020) was an Ethiopian painter, airplane pilot, and author. He created some ten-thousand of his original artworks, and used goat skin for painting portraits.

== Background ==
=== Early life ===
Lemma was born on February 13, 1928, in one of woredas in Oromia Region called Ada'a from his father Guya Gemeda and his mother Mare Gobena. At his early age he was obligated to become a cattle herder for his parents were pastoral. In his leisure time he was painting on the wall of his family's house, and he became a mesmerizing icon for his family. He said that his mother's craft works inspired him in childhood to become a painter.

As his painting career grew well, people from surrounding areas positively influenced his father Guya to send his son, Lemma, to school. By the age of 14, in 1942, Lemma went to "Lebna Dengel primary school" which is about 10 Kilometres from his hometown.

Lemma had a great ambition to change the socio economic status of his poor family. For this he aimed to join Teachers Training College. In 1950, Lemma went to Adama Teachers Training College, but did not stay long there. Because it takes seven years to graduate, Lemma left the college and went to his homeland, and painting.

Lemma was not idle, as he was fighting to change his parents' socio economic status. When he was in this situation, he was informed that Haile Selassie I of Ethiopia used to come to Bishoftu in every weekend. Then Lemma decided to go to Bishoftu and show the portraits of a new model of Airplane.

He got a chance to show his work, and his Majesty became surprised by Lemma's work and sent him to Ethiopian Air Force for training. He was trained as Airplane Technician and graduated with great distinction in 1954. Emperor Haile Selassie I of Ethiopia also congratulated Lemma and gifted him painting materials. Then he was sent to Asmara Air Force (when Eretria was under Ethiopia) as a teacher.

Becoming a teacher for Air Force, did not distract his artistic talent. He continued to learn painting in Italian Painting School which was in Asmara, Ethiopia from his own wage. After 11 years, in 1963, Lemma returned to his hometown.

=== Career ===
Lemma began to translate books gifted to him by many foreigners after his return from Asmara, among them "Sil yale astemari" which was the first one. By the time of any modernized printing machine nationally, Lemma became a good printer to multiply and distribute colorfully painted portraits of Ethiopian nations and nationalities, especially Oromo people.

Among his notable work 'Kuwanta' has become very meaningful. On this portrait, Lemma tried to glimpse Africa's natural resource corruption. On this portrait there are 2 cats looking at meat that hung on horizontally tied rope.

In 1983 Lemma Guya opened an art gallery that was called Lemma Guya art gallery that was located in the Oromia region of Bishoftu. This art gallery began to be a place of study for african art and artist.

=== Awards ===
Lemma's paintings have been exhibited and sold successfully in America, Sweden, United Kingdom, Nigeria, Kenya and Senegal and let him win numerous prizes and awards. Lemma was awarded as "a man who is an author of notable work which glimpse three generations" by Native American Heritage Association. For his contribution to the society of Oromia the University of Jimma also awarded him Honorary Doctorate.

== Death ==
Lemma had become sick since 2018, and was supported by national and international doctors. On October 26, 2020, he died in Addis Ababa, Ethiopia. Ethiopian News Agency on his official website noted that "Famous Ethiopian Painter Lemma Guya Dies at 92".

He had married Aster Bekele in 1960s, and together they had three sons, two daughters and eight grandchildren. Lemma's five children are following in his footsteps. Lemmas daughters continued to study and train to be painters. One of Lemmas sons is also took the painting career path and graduated from the Nigerian arts college.
