= Abel Tilahun =

Ethiopian artist and filmmaker

Abel Tilahun is an Ethiopian artist and filmmaker, who works across traditional and emerging art forms. At the heart of his work is a concern for both the cutting edge and the long arc of history.

== Early life and education ==
Tilahun was born in Addis Ababa, Ethiopia and grew up in an artistic environment. His mother is a professionally trained clarinetist and his father is an engineer who enjoys painting. He earned his BFA in Sculpture from Addis Ababa University, Alle School of Fine Arts and Design in 2006. After moving to the United States, he earned his master's degree in fine art from Adams State University in 2010 and was recognized as the Cloyde Snook Scholar of 2009–10. He earned his Phd in Creativity from University of The Arts in 2022. He is a recipient of the prestigious Guggenheim Postdoctoral research Fellowship at the Smithsonian National Air and Space Museum Jul 2023 – Jul 2024.

== Artistic career ==
Since his first solo show in 2007, "The Blueprint," Tilahun has exhibited his work on three continents. He has held several subsequent solo shows, "Interface Effect," was held from May–June 2014 in the Alliance Ethio-Francaise in Addis Ababa. This show, as well as a number of group exhibitions in which Tilahun has participated, was curated by renowned independent curator Meskerem Assegued. Tilahun's work is also featured within the three-artist video art exhibition "Curvature of Events," which was curated by Assegued in Dresden's celebrated New Master's Gallery at the Staatliche Kunstsammlungen Dresden (English: Dresden state art Collections). This show opened on 16 October 2014 and will be on display until 4 January 2015.

== Exhibitions ==
Bolded entries indicate solo exhibitions. Other entries are group exhibitions.

- 2014: "Interface Effect", curated by Meskerem Assegued. Alliance Ethio-Francaise, Addis Ababa, Ethiopia.
- 2014: "Curvature of Events", curated by Meskerem Assegued. Staatliche Kunstsammlungen Dresden, Dresden, Germany.
- 2013: "Heart-to-Heart: Rome to AddIs", curated by Meskerem Assegued. National Theatre Gallery, Addis Ababa, Ethiopia.
- 2010: "A Generation Projected". Cloyde Snook Gallery, Alamosa, Colorado.
- 2009: "Three on Paper". Lloyds Gallery, Fort Collins, Colorado.
- 2009: "Works from the Valley's Edge". Edge Gallery, Denver, Colorado.
- 2009: "Invitational Screening of The Hair". Indie Spirit Film Festival, Colorado Springs, Colorado.
- 2008: "Ventero Open Press Exhibition". Cloyde Snook Gallery, Alamosa, Colorado.
- 2008: "Milkshake". Hatfield Gallery, Alamosa, Colorado.
- 2008: "Screening of The Hair". Alamosa Film Festival, Alamosa, Colorado.
- 2007: "The Blueprint". Alliance Ethio-Francaise, Addis Ababa, Ethiopia.
- 2006: "Undergraduate Thesis Show". Alle School of Fine Arts and Design, Addis Ababa, Ethiopia.
- 2005: "Addis Abeba Zare", curated by Meskerem Assegued. Addis Ababa, Ethiopia.

== Personal life ==
Along with his studio practice in Washington, D.C. and Addis Ababa, Tilahun taught at American University in Washington D.C. as an adjunct professor of digital imaging, motion graphics, and animation. Tilahun married scholar-filmmaker Isabelle Zaugg in 2007.
