= Tadesse Mamechae =

Ethiopian sculptor (born 1941)

Tadesse Mamecha
- Born: Tadesse; 1941 (age 83–84); Debre Sina
- Other names: Tadesse Mamecha Gebre-Tsadik
- Citizenship: Ethiopia
- Education: Leningrad Academy of Arts
- Alma mater: Addis Ababa
- Occupation: Sculptor

Tadesse Mamecha (born 1941, also known as Tadesse Mamecha Gebre-Tsadik) is an Ethiopian sculptor. His most famous sculpture is "The Afar" which stands in front of the National Theater on Churchill Road.

== Education and Career ==
Tadesse Mamecha studied at the Art School in Addis Ababa from 1958 to 1962. The continued his studies by attending Leningrad Academy of Arts (U.S.S.R.) from 1963 to 1970 and earned a M.A. in Fine Arts. He returned to Ethiopia and served as a teacher at the Addis Ababa Arts School.

His work has been exhibited in Addis Ababa, Sweden and Denmark. His works have been exhibited at the National Museum in Addis Ababa as recently as February 2011.
