= Azerbaijani Americans =

ABŞ Azərbaycanlıları
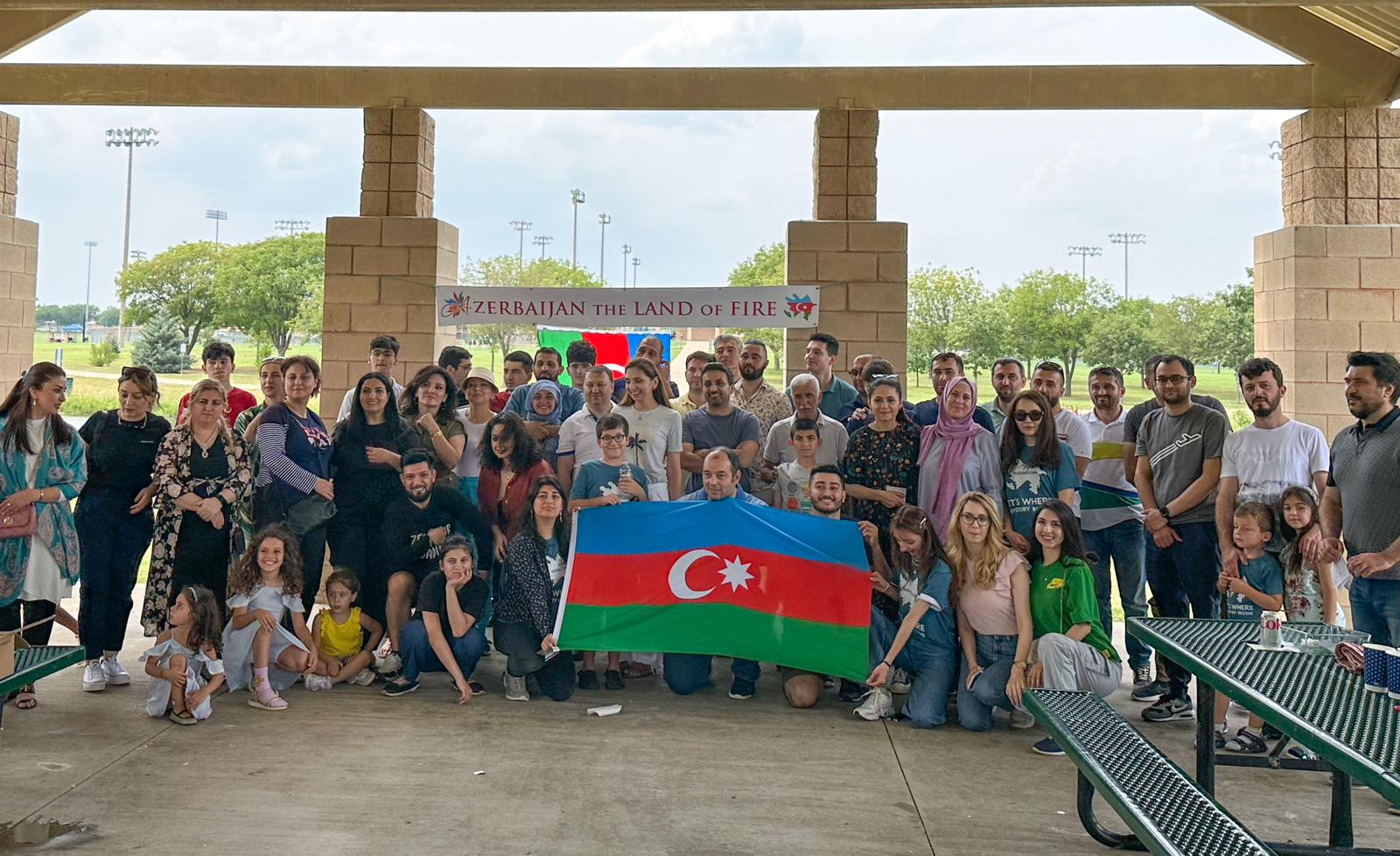
- Azerbaijani community of Dallas, Texas

Total population
- 80,000

Regions with significant populations
- New York metropolitan area, Greater Houston, Greater Los Angeles, Chicago Metropolitan Area, Dallas–Fort Worth metroplex

Languages
- Azerbaijani, Russian, American English

Religion
- Shia Islam

Related ethnic groups
- Azerbaijani Canadians, Turkish Americans, Iranian Americans

Azerbaijani Americans (Azerbaijani: ABŞ Azərbaycanlıları, or Amerikalı Azərbaycanlılar) are Americans of Azerbaijani descent that have immigrated to the United States from Azerbaijan and neighboring countries such as Iran, Georgia, Russia and Turkey.

== History ==
The earliest identified immigrant from Azerbaijan to the United States was Merza Ali Akbar, resident of Baku who arrived at Ellis Island on the RMS Mauretania in June 1912.

The first major wave of Azerbaijanis came to the U.S. in the 1940s and 1950s, as many Azerbaijani émigrés and POWs left the Soviet Union and Iran during and after World War II. Among those were also a number of expatriates, who fled to Turkey, Iran, or parts of Europe upon the Soviet occupation of Azerbaijan in 1920, and in the 1950s and 1960s, moved to the United States in pursuit of better economic opportunities. This wave of Azerbaijani immigrants settled mainly in New York City and its metropolitan area, which hosts the largest population of Azerbaijani-Americans, in Northern New Jersey and Massachusetts; and later in Florida, Texas, and California, especially in Los Angeles area where there is a large Iranian community, many of whom are Iranian Azerbaijanis. In 1957, a group of these Azerbaijani settlers in New Jersey founded the Azerbaijan Society of America, the first Azerbaijani-American community organization. By 1980, there were around 200 families that identified themselves as Azerbaijani in the United States, with about 80% of them being endogamic. In 1976, Houston and Baku established the first sister-city association between the cities in the U.S. and Azerbaijan. It was followed with a sister city between Honolulu, Hawaii, and Baku in 1988, Newark, New Jersey, and Ganja (second largest city in Azerbaijan) in the early 2000s (decade); and Monterey, California and Lankaran in 2011.

== Demographics ==
According to the 2000 U.S. census, there were an estimated 14,205 Americans born in Azerbaijan, out of which 5,530 were naturalized U.S. Citizens and 5,553 identified themselves as Azerbaijani of either primary or secondary ancestry. Azerbaijanis who immigrated from Azerbaijan have settled primarily in New York (12,540), New Jersey (4,357), Texas (3,178), California (2,743), and Minnesota (1,559). Census 2000 did not count Azerbaijani-Americans born in countries other than Azerbaijan.

According to the Department of Homeland Security, additional ~24,000 individuals born in Azerbaijan successfully adjusted to or entered on permanent residency (Green Cards) between 2000 and 2023, heavily driven by the Diversity Visa Lottery. An estimated ~6,500 ethnic Azerbaijanis arrived from other former Soviet Union countries (e.g., the Borçali region of Georgia).

Applying standard U.S. population growth trends (historical Total Fertility Rate averaging ~1.85 children per household) across a staggered 26-year timeline since 2000, produces the most up to date estimate of 80,000 Azerbaijani Americans as of end of year 2026. This number does not include Iranian Azerbaijanis.

== Socio-political activity ==
The first mention of the nascent Azerbaijani-Americans in the U.S. political life appears in the 1990 issue of The Economist. By the late 1990s, the Azerbaijani-Americans became more active in the American sociopolitical life, including the U.S. Congress, mainly advocating Azerbaijani interests in the Nagorno-Karabakh conflict. By 2002, the Azerbaijani-Americans became active enough to be mentioned in the speeches in the U.S. Congress. In 2004, a group of Congressmen founded the Congressional Azerbaijan Caucus in the U.S. House of Representatives. By 2011, the Azerbaijani-Americans have been honored in several U.S. legislative bills and resolutions.

== Organizations ==
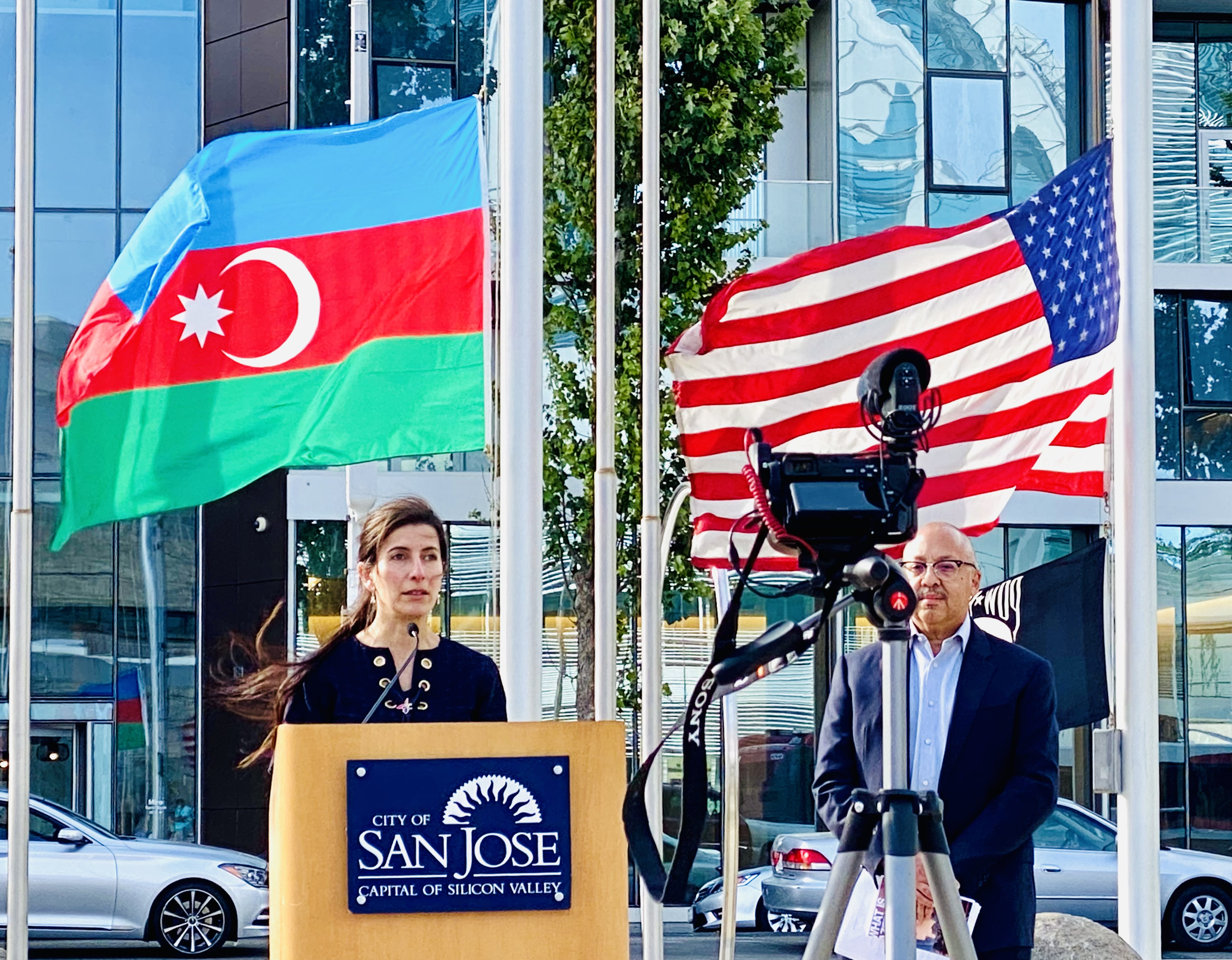
The Azerbaijan Flag Raising at San Jose City Hall in June 2022

Below is the list of Azerbaijani American organizations registered in the United States as of 2026.

- Azerbaijan Cultural Society of Northern California (Los Gatos, CA)
- Azerbaijani-American Cultural Association of Florida (Miami, FL)
- Azerbaijani American Youth Association (Miami, FL)
- Azerbaijani American Community of Florida (Miami, FL)
- Azerbaijan Center of Midwest America (Chicago, IL)
- Azerbaijan Society of Maine (Portland, ME)
- Azerbaijan Friendship Organization (Raleigh, NC)
- United Azerbaijan House (Greensboro, NC)
- Azerbaijani American Medical Association (Albany, NY)
- Azerbaijan New York Cultural Center (New York, NY)
- National Music & Global Culture Society (New York, NY)
- Azerbaijani-American Youth Federation (New York, NY)
- The Azerbaijan Association of New York (New York, NY)
- Azerbaijan Center (Houston, TX)
- Azerbaijan-American Music Foundation (Dallas, TX)
- US-Azerbaijan Center of Integration (Houston, TX)
- The Utah Azerbaijan Community (Salt Lake City, UT)
- Association of Washington State Azerbaijanis (Seattle, WA)

== Azerbaijani-themed parks, streets and monuments ==
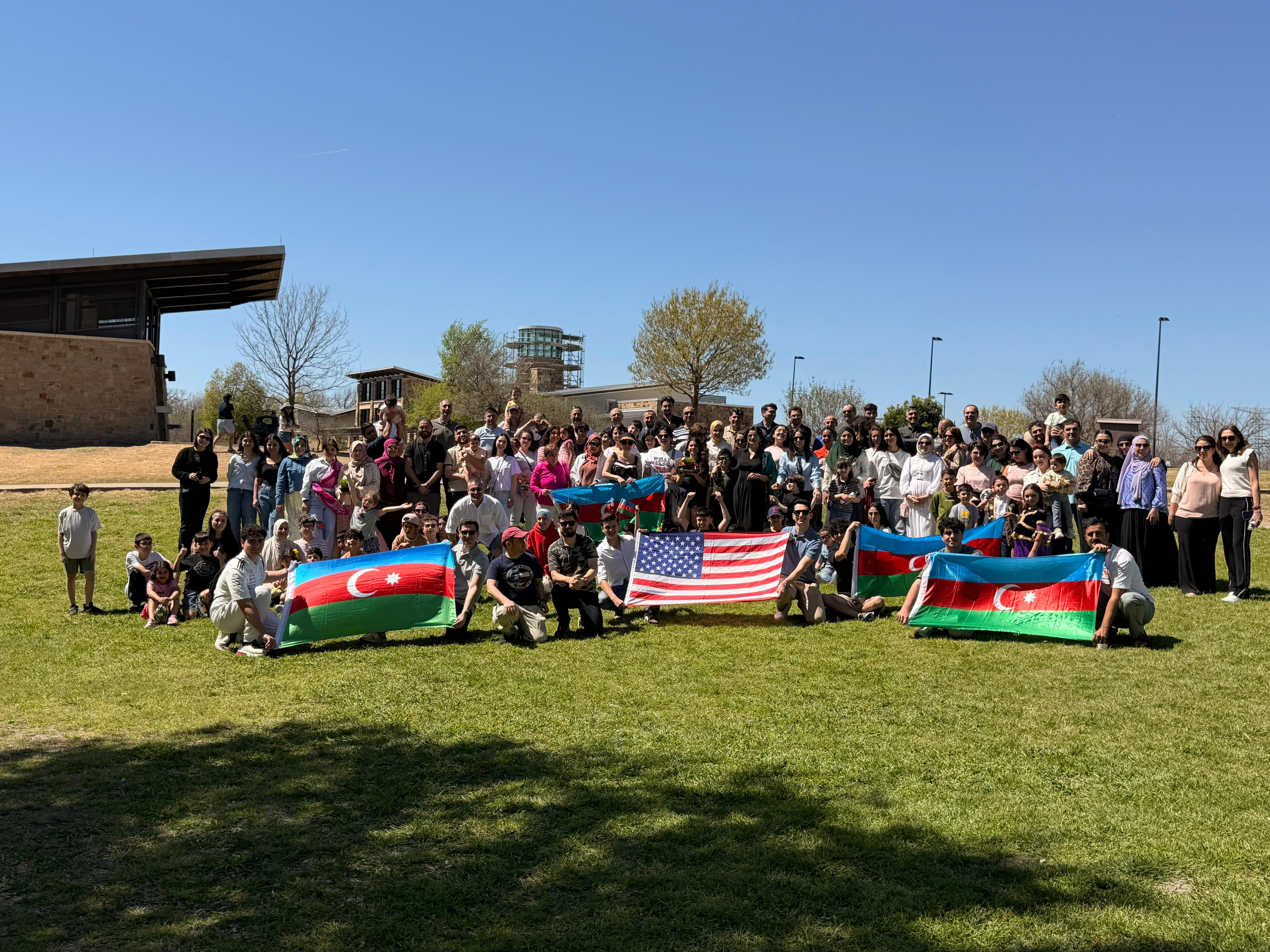
Azerbaijani community of North Texas in March 2026

The Azerbaijan Garden, opened on May 12, 2008, in Cleveland, Ohio as part of Cleveland Cultural Gardens. Khanlar Gasimov's sculpture "Hearth" stands at the center of the garden. Made of polished stainless steel, the bowl-shaped sculpture allows viewers to see the reflection of the earth and sky in its exterior and interior curves. The Azerbaijani Garden is part of the Cleveland Cultural Gardens, which was opened in 1916, along Doan Brook in Cleveland's Rockefeller Park. The opening of the garden was celebrated by Congressman Dennis Kucinich.

== TV, radio, media, and newspapers ==
- Gunaz TV - TV broadcast from Chicago via satellite and Internet in Azerbaijani language
- Azerbaijan International - Los Angeles–based quarterly magazine that published from 1993 to 2011
- Azerbaijani Radio Hour - weekly radio show on WUST station from 2011 to 2012

== Notable people ==
- Lotfi A. Zadeh, mathematician, electrical engineer, and computer scientist
- Nazim Sadykhov MMA fighter, competing in the Ultimate Fighting Championship
- Elariz Mammadoğlu, Azerbaijani singer based in New York
- Vugar Orujov, freestyle wrestler, bronze medalist of 1992 Summer Olympics
- Vito Arujau, American wrestler of Azerbaijani descent
- Elshan Gambarov, soccer coach and former player for Azerbaijan national football team
- Nargiz Birk-Petersen, Azerbaijani-American lawyer, presenter, and model
- Nargiz Aliyarova, New York based Azerbaijani pianist
- Nazim Muradov, researcher, author, and inventor in the field of clean energy technology
- Alec Rasizade, professor of history and political science
- Max Amini, stand-up comedian, half-Azerbaijani through his mother
- Sona Aslanova, Soviet and Azerbaijani soprano
- Ella Leya, composer, singer, and writer, born in Baku
- Chingiz Sadykhov, pianist
- Ali Hajizade, Azerbaijani-American political analyst and entrepreneur
- Ida Pavlichenko, biomedical engineer
- Konstantin Slavin, professor and neurosurgeon
- Stepan Pachikov, businessman
- Semyon Bilmes, Azerbaijani-American painter
- Shireen Hunter, academic
- Ali Javan, professor of physics, inventor of gas laser, Massachusetts Institute of Technology
- Cihangir Ghaffari, Azerbaijani-born Iranian-American actor and producer

== See also ==
- Azerbaijani diaspora
- Azerbaijan–United States relations
- Iranian Americans
- Turkish Americans
