= Asian people =

Umbrella term for people in Asia or of Asian descent

Asian people or Asians (sometimes "Asiatic people") is an umbrella term for people who belong to any ethnic, racial, or national group with origins in Asia. It is most often used in contexts concerning the Asian diaspora, which consists of Asian people and their descendants living outside of the continent. The exact definition of the term may vary by country; some classifications of "Asian" may only refer to certain Asian-origin groups, as opposed to the population of the entire continent.

== Meanings by region ==
=== Anglophone Africa and the Caribbean ===
In parts of anglophone Africa, especially East Africa and in parts of the Caribbean, the term "Asian" is more commonly associated with people of South Asian origin, particularly Indians, Pakistanis, Bangladeshis and Sri Lankans. In South Africa the term "Asian" has historically been used primarily in reference to the Indian race group. East Asians in South Africa, including Chinese were classified either as Coloureds or as honorary whites.

=== Arab countries of the Persian Gulf ===
In the Arab states of the Persian Gulf, the term "Asian" generally refers to people of South Asian and Southeast Asian descent due to the large Indian, Pakistani, Bangladeshi, and Filipino expatriate populations in these countries. However, there are instances where the term is used solely to refer to those of South Asian descent.

=== Australia ===
The Australian Census includes four regions of Asia in its official definition. Defined by the 2006–2011 Australian Census, three broad groups have the word Asian included in their name: Central and Southern Asian, South-East Asian and North-East Asian. West Asians are classified as North African and Middle Eastern.

=== Canada ===
The Canadian Census uses the term 'Asian' pan-continentally. In its presentation of the "ethnic origin" results of the 2016 census, Statistics Canada under the category "Asian origins" includes: West Central Asian and Middle Eastern (includes "Arab, not otherwise specified"), South Asian, East and Southeast Asian, and "other" Asian origins.

=== New Zealand ===
New Zealand's census undertaken by Statistics New Zealand defines Asian to include people of Bangladeshi, Chinese, Indian, Korean, Filipino, Japanese, Vietnamese, Sri Lankan, Cambodian and Thai ancestries. In less formal contexts, the term Asian often does not refer to South Asian people. Those of West or Central Asian origin are excluded from the term.

=== Norway ===
Statistics Norway uses the term 'Asian' pan-continentally and considers people of Asian background to be people from all Asian countries.

=== Sweden ===
Statistics Sweden uses the term 'Asian' to refer to immigrants of Asian background from all Asian countries, including Western Asia/the Middle East. West Asians make up the largest region of Asian descent in the country, with Iraq once being the largest group of Asian immigrants.

=== United Kingdom ===
In the United Kingdom, the term "Asian" is more commonly associated with people of South Asian origin, particularly Indians, Pakistanis, Bangladeshis and Sri Lankans. Most respondents to the UK 2001 Census of non-Chinese East Asian and Southeast Asian descent chose to write-in their ethnicity in the "Other Ethnic Group" category rather than the "Other Asian" category, reflecting the association of the word Asian in the UK with South Asian. Despite there being a strong presence of East Asians in the United Kingdom there are considerably more South Asians, for example the 2001 Census recorded 1.05 million people of Indian origin and 247,000 of Chinese origin in the UK. Common origins in the "Other Asian" category include Filipinos, and Nepalese. Peter J. Aspinall of the Centre for Health Services Studies, University of Kent, recommends privileging the term "South Asian" over the term "Asian", since the term "Asian" is a "contested term".

=== United States ===
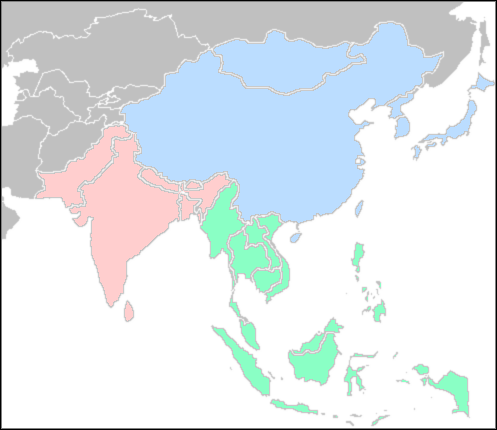
Asian ancestries as defined by the 2000 US census

In 1968, an Asian activist conference decided on favoring the name "Asian American" over the competing terms—"yellow", "Mongoloid", "Asiatic", and "Oriental"—since the Filipinos at the meeting thought they were "brown" rather than "yellow" and the conference thought the term "Oriental" was Eurocentric since they originate from lands "east" only from Europe's standpoint and the term "Oriental" suggested to them "passivity".

Earlier Census forms from 1980 and prior listed particular Asian ancestries as separate groups along with White and Black or Negro. Previously, Asian Americans were classified as "other". But the 1980 census marked the first general analyses of Asians as a group, combining several individual ancestry groups into "Asian or Pacific Islander." By the 1990 census, Asian or Pacific Islander (API) was included as an explicit category, although respondents had to select one particular ancestry.

The 2000 and 2010 US Census Bureau definition of the Asian race is: "people having origins in any of the original peoples of the Far East, Southeast Asia, or the Indian subcontinent (for example, Bangladesh, Cambodia, China, India, Indonesia, Japan, Korea, Malaysia, Pakistan, the Philippine Islands, Thailand, and Vietnam)".

Sandra S. Lee et al. (2001) said, in regards to the categories of the 2000 US census, that it is difficult to determine why Asian Americans are a "race" while Latino and Hispanic are an "ethnic group." Lee said, referring to the Hispanic or Latino category, that the category of Asian Americans, quite similarly, comprises different populations of diverse origins. Lee said that people of South Asian origin were categorically identified as "Hindu," regardless of their religion, in the early 20th century. Lee said that the policy changed to classify people from the Indian subcontinent as "white." Lee said that, more recently, South Asian Americans were added to the long list of groups that comprise the category of Asian American. Referring to their classification as "Asian," Lee said that, in the United States, the classification of people from the Indian subcontinent depends on their historical location.

In 1930 and 1940, Indian Americans were identified as a separate race, Hindu, and in 1950 and 1960 they were racially classified as Other Race, and then in 1970 they were classified as White. Since 1980, Indians and all other South Asians have been classified as part of the Asian ethnic group. Sociologist Madhulika Khandelwal described how "....as a result of activism, South Asians came to be included as 'Asians' in the census only in the 80's. Prior to that many South Asians had been checking 'Caucasian' or 'Other'."

Respondents can also report their specific ancestry, e.g.: Okinawan, etc. Someone reporting these ancestries but no race would be classified as "Asian". Unlike Southeast Asians, Afghan Americans, Arab Americans, Armenian Americans, Assyrian Americans, Azerbaijani Americans, Georgian Americans, Israeli Americans, Kurdish Americans, Turkish Americans and Iranian Americans have not lobbied to be included as Asians by the US Census Board.

In normal American usage Asian does not refer to the people from the Pacific Islands (Melanesia, Micronesia, and Polynesia) who are usually called Pacific Islanders. The term "Asians and Pacific Islanders" or "Asia/Pacific" was used on the 1990 U.S. census.

However, in the 2000 US census, the Asian or Pacific Islander category was separated into two categories, "Asian" and "Native Hawaiian or Other Pacific Islander".

== See also ==
- Demographics of Asia
  - Ethnic groups in Asia
- List of Asian countries by population
  - Asian diaspora
- Eastern world
  - Orient
