= Pavlichenko =

Pavlichenko (Ukrainian: Павліченко; Russian: Павличенко), Paulichenka or Paŭličenka (Belarusian: Паўлічэнка) is a Ukrainian surname. Notable people with the surname include:

- Dmitri Pavlichenko (born 1966), Belarusian official, head of SOBR
- Ida Pavlichenko (born c. 1987), Azerbaijani biomedical engineer
- Lyudmila Pavlichenko (1916–1974), Soviet sniper
- Semen Pavlichenko (born 1991), Russian luger
- Pavlichenko family, fictional Russian and Japanese family in the anime series Darker than Black
  - Suo Pavlichenko, female character within the fictional family

== See also ==
- Pavlychenko
