= Ethnic groups in Asia =

Asian people
Total population
- 4,533,765,005; 59.4% of the total world population (World population of 7.5 billion)

Regions with significant populations
- West, Central, South, East, Southeast, and North Asia
- India: 1,496,834,042
- China (PRC): 1,313,688,986
- Indonesia: 262,787,403
- Pakistan: 238,181,034
- Bangladesh: 164,098,818
- Japan: 126,168,156
- Philippines: 118,277,063
- Vietnam: 97,040,334
- Iran: 85,888,910
- Turkey: 85,372,377
- Thailand: 68,615,858
- Myanmar: 57,069,099
- South Korea: 51,418,097
- Afghanistan: 40,121,552
- Iraq: 39,650,145
- Saudi Arabia: 33,091,113
- Uzbekistan: 36,520,593
- Malaysia: 34,564,810
- Yemen: 32,140,443
- Nepal: 30,424,878
- North Korea: 25,831,360
- Taiwan (ROC): 23,545,963
- Sri Lanka: 23,044,123
- Syria: 19,454,263
- Kazakhstan: 18,744,548
- Cambodia: 17,288,489
- Azerbaijan: 10,650,239
- Jordan: 10,458,413
- Tajikistan: 10,394,063
- United Arab Emirates: 9,701,315
- Israel: 9,402,617
- Laos: 7,953,556
- Kyrgyzstan: 7,213,455
- Singapore: 5,996,000
- Turkmenistan: 5,744,151
- Oman: 5,494,691
- Lebanon: 5,469,612
- Kuwait: 4,985,716
- Palestine: 4,683,000
- Mongolia: 3,504,741
- Qatar: 3,063,005
- Bahrain: 1,566,888
- Brunei: 460,345

Languages
- Languages of Asia (Chinese, Hindi-Urdu, Arabic, Bengali, Marathi, Tamil, Japanese, Filipino, Indonesian, Turkish, Burmese, Khmer, Korean, Lao, Nepali, Malay, Uzbek, Mongolian, Persian, Thai, Pashto, Vietnamese, Kazakh and Hebrew among other minority Asian languages)

Religion
- Major: Islam and Hinduism; Minor: Buddhism, Christianity, Sikhism, Shinto and others

The ancestral population of modern Asian people has its origins in the two primary prehistoric settlement centres – greater Southwest Asia and from the Mongolian Plateau towards Northern China.

Migrations of distinct ethnolinguistic groups have probably occurred as early as 10,000 years ago. However, around 2,000 BCE early Iranian speaking people and Indo-Aryans arrived in Iran and northern Indian subcontinent. Pressed by the Mongols, Turkic peoples often migrated to the western and northern regions of the Central Asian plains. Prehistoric migrants from South China and Southeast Asia seem to have populated East Asia, Korea, and Japan in several waves, where they gradually replaced indigenous people, such as the Ainu, who are of uncertain origin. Austroasiatic and Austronesian people establish in Southeast Asia between 5.000 and 2.000 BCE, partly merging with, but eventually displacing the indigenous Australo-Melanesians.

In terms of Asian people, there is an abundance of ethnic groups in Asia, with adaptations to the climate zones of the continent, which include arctic, subarctic, temperate, subtropical or tropical, as well as extensive desert regions in Central and West Asia. The ethnic groups have adapted to mountains, deserts, grasslands, and forests, while on the coasts of Asia, resident ethnic groups have adopted various methods of harvest and transport. The types of diversity in Asia are cultural, religious, economic and historical.

Ethnological map of the Pamirs

Some groups are primarily hunter-gatherers- whereas others practice transhumance (nomadic lifestyle), have been agrarian for millennia, or adopted an industrial or urban lifestyle. Some groups or countries in Asia are completely urban (e.g., Qatar and Singapore); the largest countries in Asia with regard to population are the China, India, Indonesia, Pakistan, Bangladesh, Japan, Philippines, Vietnam, Iran, Turkey, Thailand, Burma, South Korea, Uzbekistan, and Malaysia. Colonisation of Asian ethnic groups and states by European peoples began in the late 1st millennium BCE, reaching its peak in the late 19th and early 20th centuries.

== West Asia ==
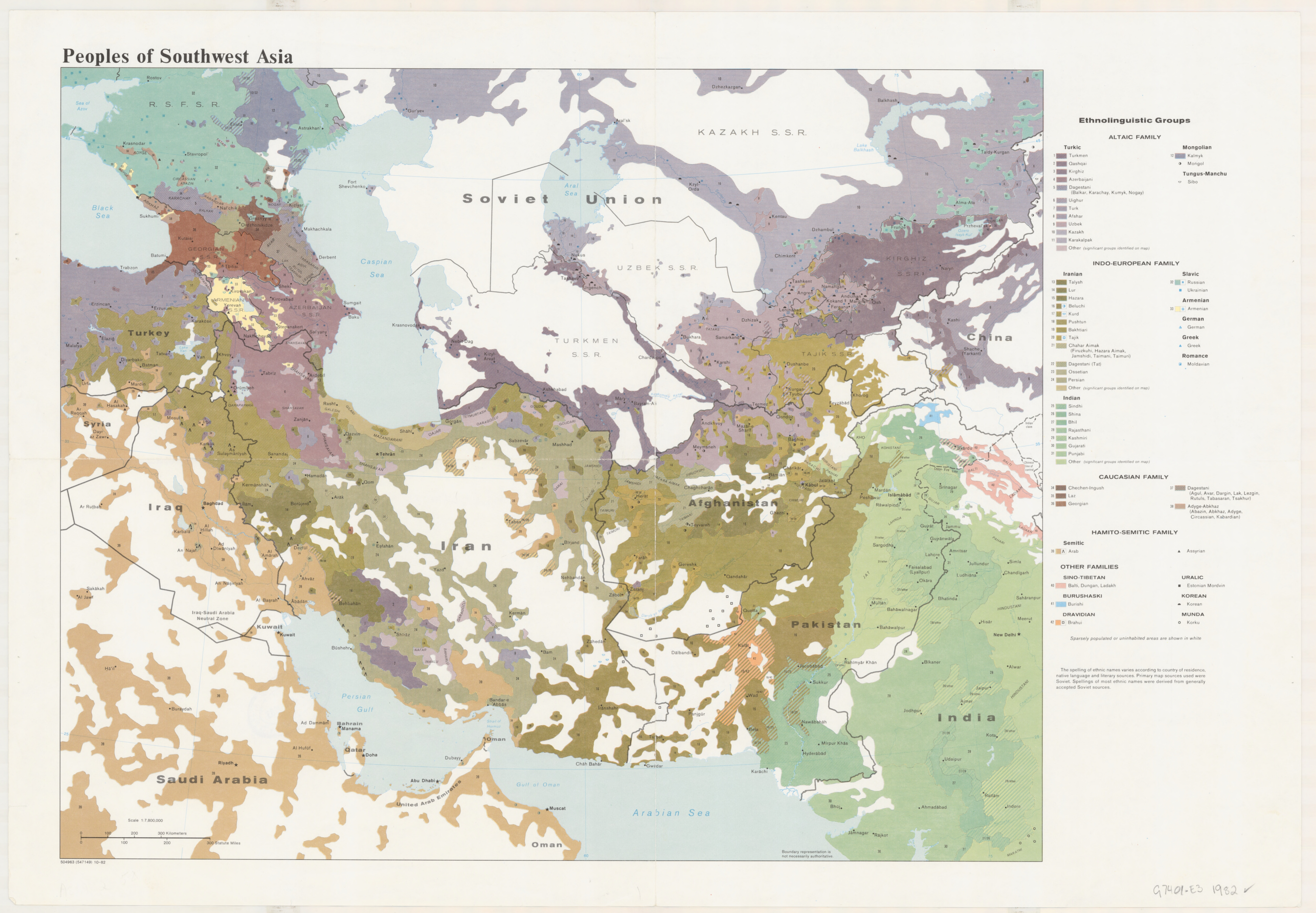
Ethnolinguistic distribution in Central/Southwest Asia of the Altaic, Caucasian, Afroasiatic (Hamito-Semitic) and Indo-European families

A Jewish man blows a shofar

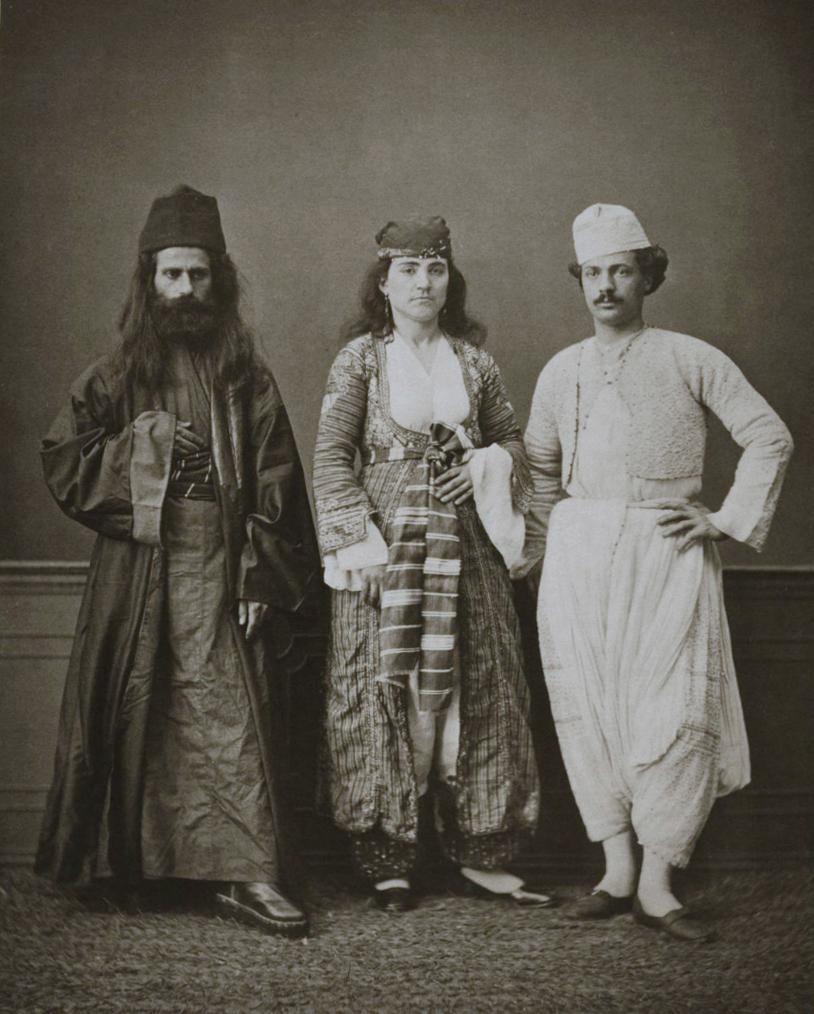
Traditional costumes of (from right to left) a Christian resident of Famagusta, a Christian woman of Famagusta, and an Orthodox monk of the Monastery of Tchiko, near Lefka. Photographed in Cyprus in 1873.

West Asia is sometimes referred to as "Southwest Asia". West Asia consists of Armenia, Azerbaijan, Bahrain, Cyprus, Georgia, Iran, Iraq, Israel, Jordan, Kuwait, Lebanon, Oman, Palestine, Qatar, Saudi Arabia, Syria, United Arab Emirates, Yemen, most of Turkey, and part of Egypt.

Culturally, the region's dominant ethnic groups are Arab (about 150 million), Turkic (about 60 million), Persian (about 50 million) and Kurds (about 35 million). Other indigenous minorities include Jews (6.2 million), Assyrians (about 400,000), Armenians (about 4.5 million), Azerbaijanis (about 40 million), Mandaeans, Yazidis, Circassians, Greeks, and others. Many of the West Asian countries contain expansive deserts, and thus many nomadic groups exist today, most notably the Bedouin Arabs.

== Central Asia ==
Ethnic map of Central Asia

Central Asia, in its most common definition, is deemed to consist of five former Soviet Socialist Republics: Kazakhstan, Kyrgyzstan, Tajikistan, Uzbekistan, and Turkmenistan. In a wider view, Xinjiang of western China, Mongolia, Afghanistan, northeastern Iran, and northern Pakistan are included. Turkic, Indo-Iranian, and Mongolic peoples comprise its general ethnicities.

The main religions of Central Asia are Islam (Turkic/Indo-Iranian peoples) and Buddhism (Mongolia, Tibet). Central Asia has a long, rich history mainly based on its geographical location along the ancient Silk Road. It has been conquered by Mongols, Tibetans, Timurids, Uzbeks, Persians, Tatars, Russians, Afghans and Sarmatians, and thus has a very distinct, vibrant culture. The culture is influenced by Chinese, Indian, Jewish/Hebrew, Persian, Afghan, Arabian, Turkish, Russian, Sarmatian, and Mongolian cultures.

The music of Central Asia is rich and varied and is appreciated worldwide. Meanwhile, Central Asian cuisine is one of the most prominent cuisines of Asia, with cuisines from Pakistan, India, China, Turkey and Azerbaijan showing significant influence from the foods of Central Asia. One of the most famous Central Asian foods is kebab.

The literature of Central Asia is linked with Persian literature as historically it has been part of the Persian Empire for a lot of its history. Furthermore, sitting at the junction of the Silk Road, it has numerous Chinese, Indian and Arabian literary works.

== East Asia ==
Ethnolinguistic map of China and Taiwan

East Asians is a term used for ethnic groups that are indigenous to East Asia, which consists of Mainland China, Hong Kong, Macau, Taiwan, Tibet, Japan, Mongolia, North Korea, and South Korea. The major ethnic groups that form the core of East Asia are the Han, Korean, and Yamato. Other ethnic groups of East Asia include the Bai, Hui, Tibetans, Turkic, Manchus, Ryukyuan, Ainu, Zhuang, Mongols, and other Mongolic peoples. Ancestral East Asians are, based on archaeogenetic data, suggested to have originated in Mainland Southeast Asia, and expanded outgoing from Southern China in multiple waves northwards and southwards respectively.

The major East Asian language families are the Sinitic, Japonic, and Koreanic families. Other language families are Tibeto-Burman, Ainu languages, Mongolic, Tungusic, Turkic, Miao–Yao, Tai–Kadai, Austronesian, and Mon–Khmer.

Throughout the ages, the greatest influence on East Asia historically has been from China, where the span of its cultural influence is generally known as the Sinosphere laid the foundation for East Asian civilization. Chinese culture not only served as the foundation its own society and civilization, but for also that of its East Asian neighbors, Japan and Korea. The knowledge and ingenuity of Chinese civilization and the classics of Chinese literature and culture were seen as the foundations for a civilized life in East Asia. China served as a vehicle through which the adoption of Confucian ethical philosophy, Chinese calendar systems, political and legal systems, architectural style, diet, terminology, institutions, religious beliefs, imperial examinations that emphasized a knowledge of Chinese classics, political philosophy and culture, as well as historically sharing a common writing system reflected in the histories of Japan and Korea. The relationship between China and its cultural influence on East Asia has been compared to the historical influence of Greco-Roman civilization on Europe and the Western World. Major characteristics exported by China towards Japan and Korea include shared Chinese-derived language characteristics, as well as similar social and moral philosophies derived from Confucianist thought.

The script of the Han Chinese characters has long been a unifying feature in East Asia as the vehicle for exporting Chinese culture to its East Asian neighbors. Chinese characters became the unifying language of bureaucratic politics and religious expression in East Asia. The Chinese script was passed on first to Korea, Vietnam in the 1st century, then to Japan, where it forms a major component of the Japanese writing system. In Korea, Sejong the Great invented the hangul alphabet in 1443, which later became the main orthographic system for the Korean language in the 19th century. In Japan, much of the Japanese language is written in hiragana and katakana in addition to Chinese characters.

== North Asia ==
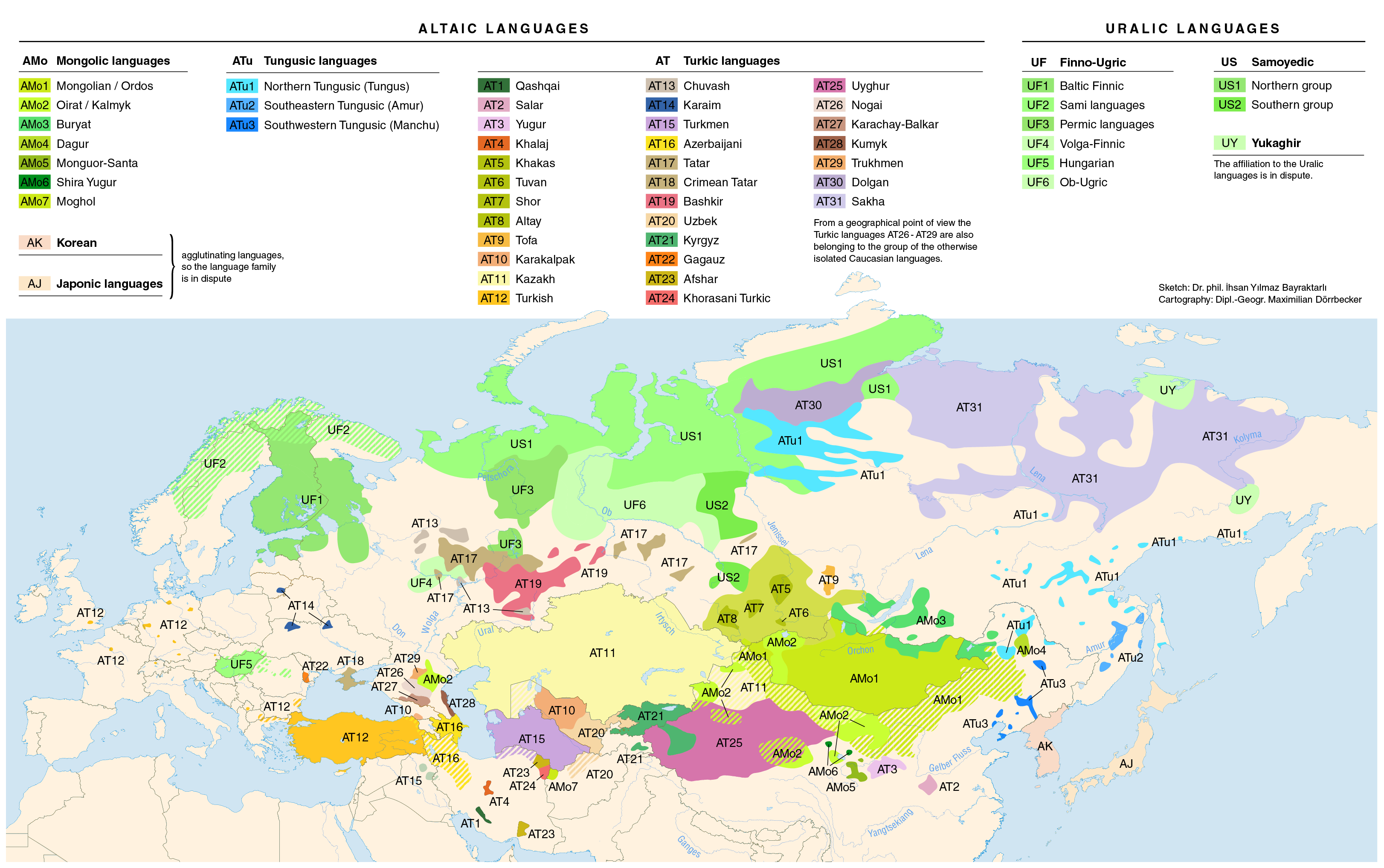
Distribution of the Uralic, Altaic, and Yukaghir languages

European influences, especially Russian, are strong in the southwestern and central part of the region, due to its high Russian population from Eastern Europe which began to settle the area in the 18th century. For the most part, North Asia is considered to be made up of the Asian part of Russia solely. North Asia is geographically the northern extremity of East Asia and the physical characteristics of its native inhabitants generally resemble that of East Asians, however, this is principally divided along political lines under separate national identities, particularly that of China, Mongolia and Russia. The main ethnic groups of the region speak languages of the Uralic, Turkic, Mongolic, and Tungusic language families, along with East Slavs and various "Paleo-Siberian" peoples, with most of these ethnic groups being composed of nomads or people with a nomadic history.

The geographic region of Siberia was the historical land of the Turkic people, the Tatars, in the Siberia Khanate. Russia, under expansion of its territory however, took control of the region now known as Siberia, and thus today it is under Russian rule. There are roughly 33 million people in North Asia.

== South Asia ==
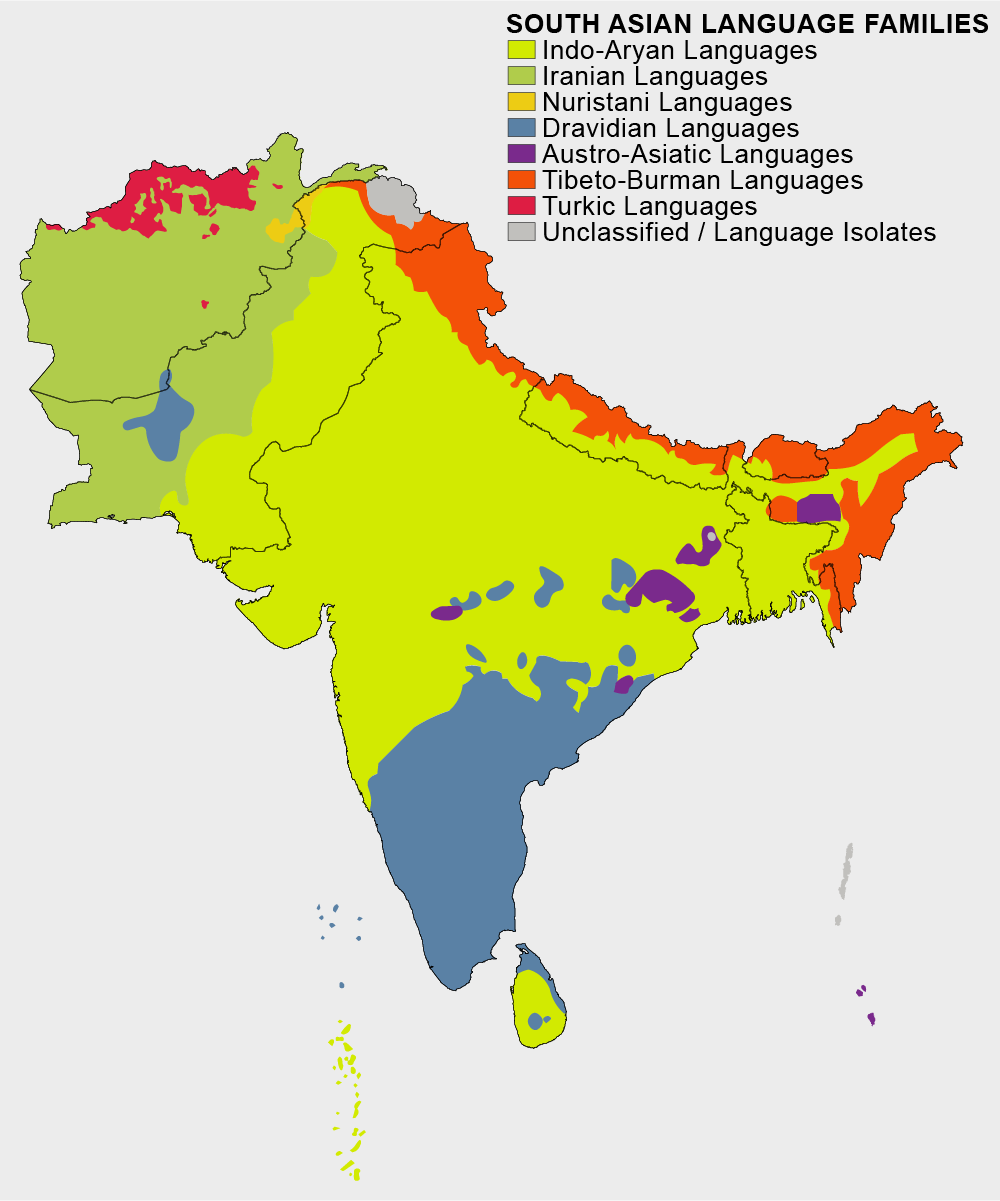
Language families in South Asia

South Asia in general definition, consists of the countries of Afghanistan, Bangladesh, Bhutan, India, Maldives, Nepal, Pakistan, and Sri Lanka. The five Southern Indian states and northeastern Sri Lanka share a Dravidian culture, due to the prominence of Dravidian languages there. The Brahuis of Pakistan also belong to Dravidian people group. Sri Lanka has two main languages, Sinhalese which has Indo-Aryan roots and Tamil which has Dravidian roots. Bangladesh and the Indian province West Bengal share a common Bengali language and culture. The provinces of Jammu Kashmir and Gilgit-Baltistan of Pakistan share a common Dardic and Tibetic heritage with the Indian territories of Jammu and Kashmir and Ladakh. Similarly the Punjab province of Pakistan and Indian state of Punjab share a common Punjabi ethnicity, language and culture. In Pakistan, the two western regions of Baluchistan and Khyber Pakhtunkhwa share a greater Iranian heritage and while the provinces of Sindh share a more Indo-Aryan culture. Iranian is most prevalent in Afghanistan, with significant Turkic speakers.

Regions of Nepal and parts of the Indian states and territories of Arunachal Pradesh, Himachal Pradesh, Jammu and Kashmir, Ladakh, Sikkim, and Uttarakhand have cultural similarity to Tibet, Tibetan Buddhism being the dominant religion there. Finally the Northeast Indian states of Meghalaya, Mizoram, Manipur, Nagaland, and tribal groups of Assam and Tripura have cultural affinities with Southeast Asia.

Bhutanese are often referred to in their literature as "Bhote" (people of Bhutia/Bhotia or Tibet). They follow Tibetan Buddhism to and it is a dominant political and cultural element in modern Bhutan. Their language, Dzongkha, is the national language and is descended from Old Tibetan.

Hinduism, Buddhism, Jainism, and Sikhism founded in the region that is today's India, and spread throughout the Indian subcontinent. Islam and Christianity also have significant histories. While India and Nepal have a majority of people following Hinduism, Islam is the second largest religion after Hinduism in India and South Asia with Muslim majority countries like Pakistan and Bangladesh. Sri Lanka and Bhutan have a majority of Buddhists alongside Hindus

Indo-Aryan languages are spoken in most of North, East, West, and Central India; Nepal; Bangladesh; Pakistan; and Sri Lanka. Dravidian languages are spoken in India, fewer parts of Pakistan, Afghanistan, Nepal, Maldives, Bangladesh, and Sri Lanka. Tibeto-Burman languages are spoken in the hills of Bangladesh, Nepal, North Pakistan, North and North East India. Austroasiatic languages are spoken in certain northern and eastern areas of Bangladesh, parts of Nepal and scattered across different zones of India mostly concentrated around Chota Nagpur Plateau and the state of Meghalaya. Iranian languages are most prevalent in Afghanistan and western Pakistan. Turkic speakers are significant in Afghanistan and due to the Afghan diaspora in parts of Pakistan as well.

== Southeast Asia ==
Southeast Asia is often split into two parts: Mainland Southeast Asia, comprising Myanmar, Cambodia, Laos, Peninsular Malaysia, Thailand, and Vietnam; and Maritime Southeast Asia, which includes Brunei, East Timor, Indonesia, East Malaysia, the Philippines, and Singapore. China has historically influenced the region more than India, most notably through the large Chinese populations in many of the countries of the region.

Demographically, Southeast Asia has had little Western immigration, although Western influence still exists due to the lasting legacy of colonialism. One example is the Philippines, which has been heavily influenced by Spain and slightly by the United States over the course of almost four centuries of colonisation.

A common feature found around the region is stilt houses, while another is rice paddy agriculture, which originated in the region thousands of years ago. Dance is also a very important feature of the culture, utilizing movements of the hands and feet perfected over thousands of years. Furthermore, the arts and literature of Southeast Asia is very distinctive as some have been influenced by Indian, Hindu, Chinese, Islamic, and Buddhist literature.

== Other minorities and migrant groups ==
=== Europeans, Russian nationals, North Americans, and South Americans ===
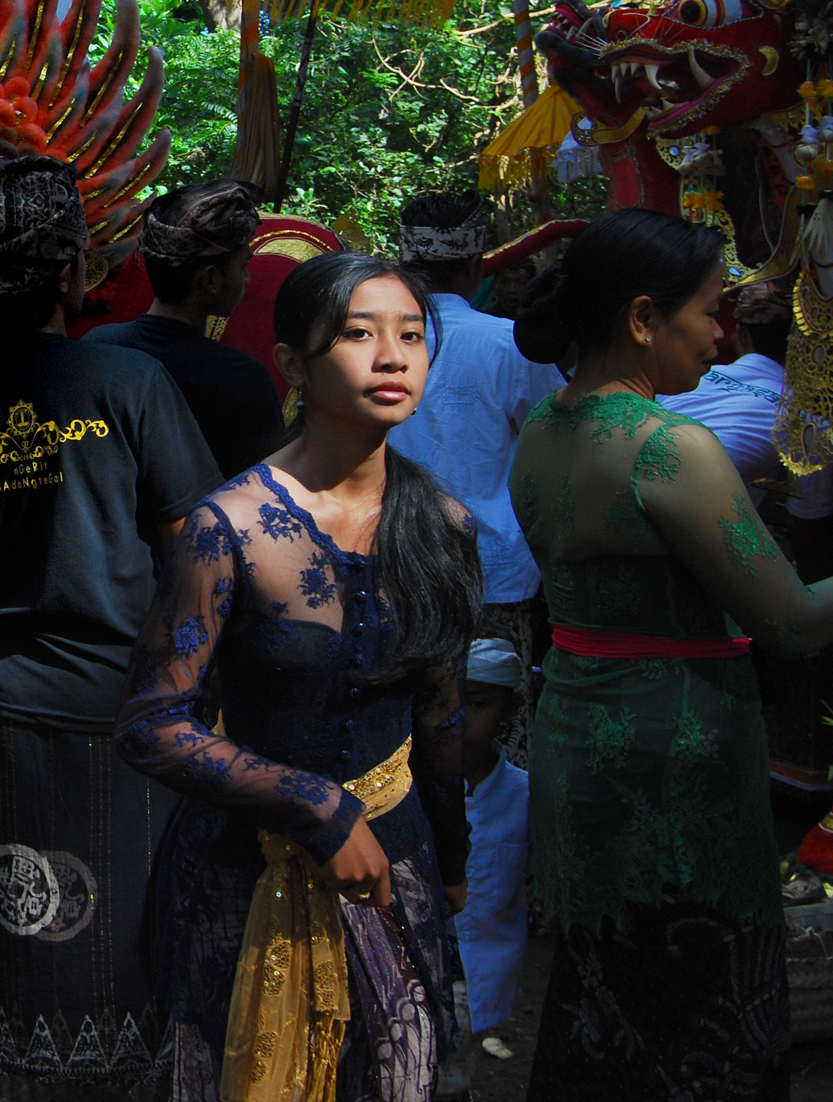
An Indonesian Balinese girl wearing a kebaya during a traditional ceremony

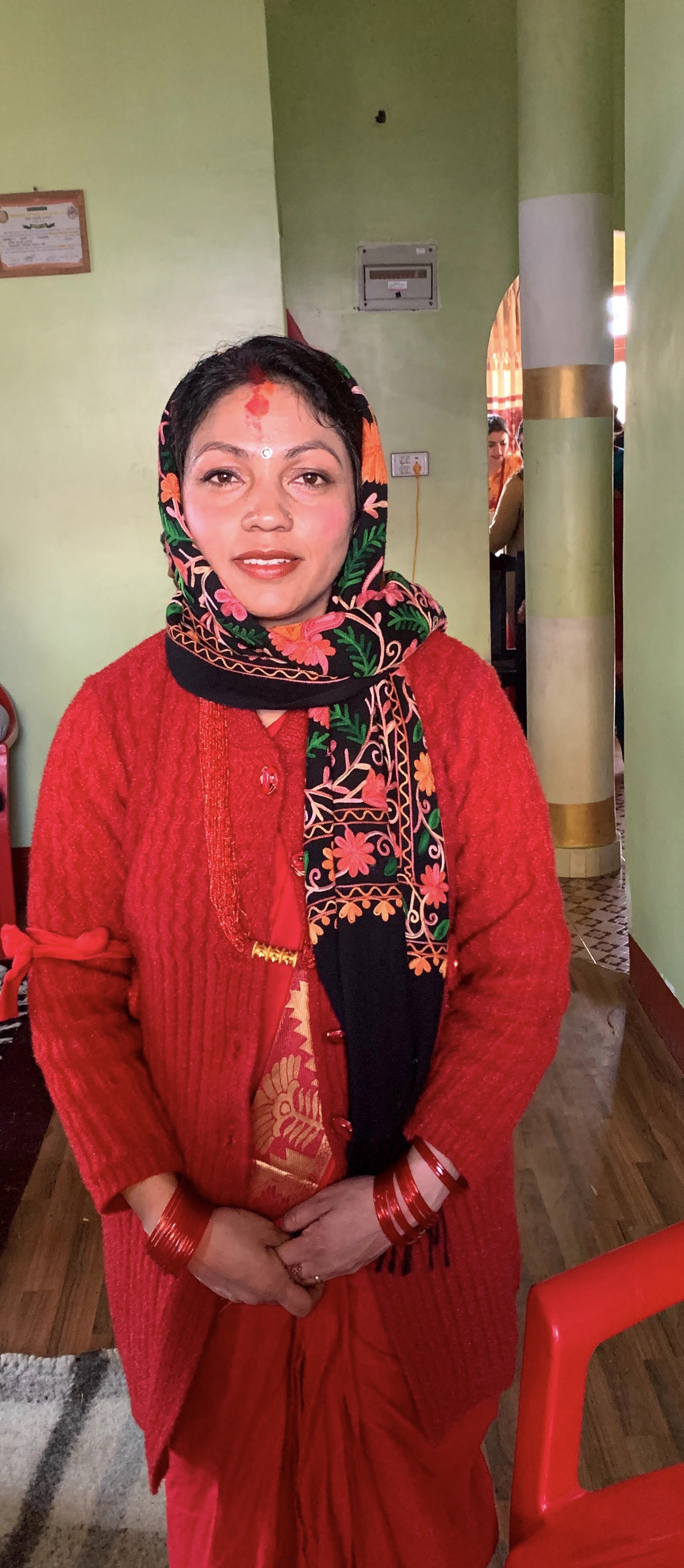
A woman in Nepalese costume

At least 21 million of European, Russian, North American and South American nationalities and heritage live in Asia, representing 0.45% of the total population of Asia. The following is a list of people with such ancestry and nationality, including people of mixed heritage of part Asian and part European/North American/South American, living in Asian countries, also showing the main country of origin.

Philippines 5 million (Spain, 4.7% of total population)

Kazakhstan 3.5 million (Russia, 19% of total population)

India 1.7 million (United Kingdom, 0.12% of total population)

Kyrgyzstan 837,000 (Russia, 13.5% of total population)

Uzbekistan 750,000 (Russia, 2.3% of total population)

United Arab Emirates 461,000 (United Kingdom, 4.9% of total population)

Turkmenistan 297,913 (Russia, 5.1% of total population)

Thailand 250,000 (United Kingdom, 0.36% of total population)

South Korea 245,000 (United States, 0.48% of total population)

Hong Kong 218,209 (United States, 3.1% of total population)

Indonesia 189,000 (Netherlands, 0.071% of total population)

Pakistan 149,253 (United Kingdom, 0.07% of total population)

Syria 120,000 (Russia, 0.7% of total population)

Azerbaijan 119,300 (Russia, 1.2% of total population)

Qatar 115,000 (United States, 4.3% of total population)

Bangladesh 110,138 (United States, 0.06% of total population)

Cyprus 109,462 (United Kingdom, 9.1% of total population)

Japan 106,000 (United States, 0.08% of total population)

Saudi Arabia 100,000 (United States, 0.3% of total population)

Singapore 76,900 (United Kingdom, 1.3% of total population)

Tajikistan 68,200 (Russia, 1.1% of total population)

Jordan 65,000 (Russia, 0.67% of total population)

Iran 50,000 (Russia, 0.061% of total population)

Malaysia 37,000 (Portugal, 0.11% of total population)

Georgia 26,453 (Russia, 0.7% of total population)

Lebanon 25,000 (United States, 0.41% of total population)

Taiwan 21,000 (United States, 0.09% of total population)

Myanmar 19,200 (United Kingdom, 0.035% of total population)

Oman 16,349 (United Kingdom, 0.39% of total population)

Bahrain 15,000 (United Kingdom, 1% of total population)

Afghanistan 13,000 (United States, 0.037% of total population)

Kuwait 13,000 (United States, 0.031% of total population)

Macau 13,000 (Portugal, 2.3% of total population)

Armenia 11,911 (Russia, 0.4% of total population)

Sri Lanka 8,856 (Italy, 0.04% of total population)

Iraq 6,000 (United States, 0.015% of total population)

Mongolia 3,000 (Russia, 0.1% of total population)

Nepal 3,000 (United States, 0.01% of total population)

Vietnam 2,700 (United States, 0.002% of total population)

North Korea 2,045 (United States, 0.008% of total population)

Maldives 1,117 (Germany, 0.25% of total population)

Cambodia 1,000 (France, 0.006% of total population)

Yemen 1,000 (United States, 0.003% of total population)

== See also ==
- Asian people
- Australoid
- Black people
- Brown (racial classification)
- Caucasoid
- Culture of Asia
- Demographics of Asia
- Indigenous peoples of Asia
- Languages of Asia
- Mongoloid
- Negroid
- Proto-Australoid
- White people
