= Demographics of Central Asia =

Population pyramid of Central Asia in 2023

The ethnolinguistic patchwork of Central Asia in 1992

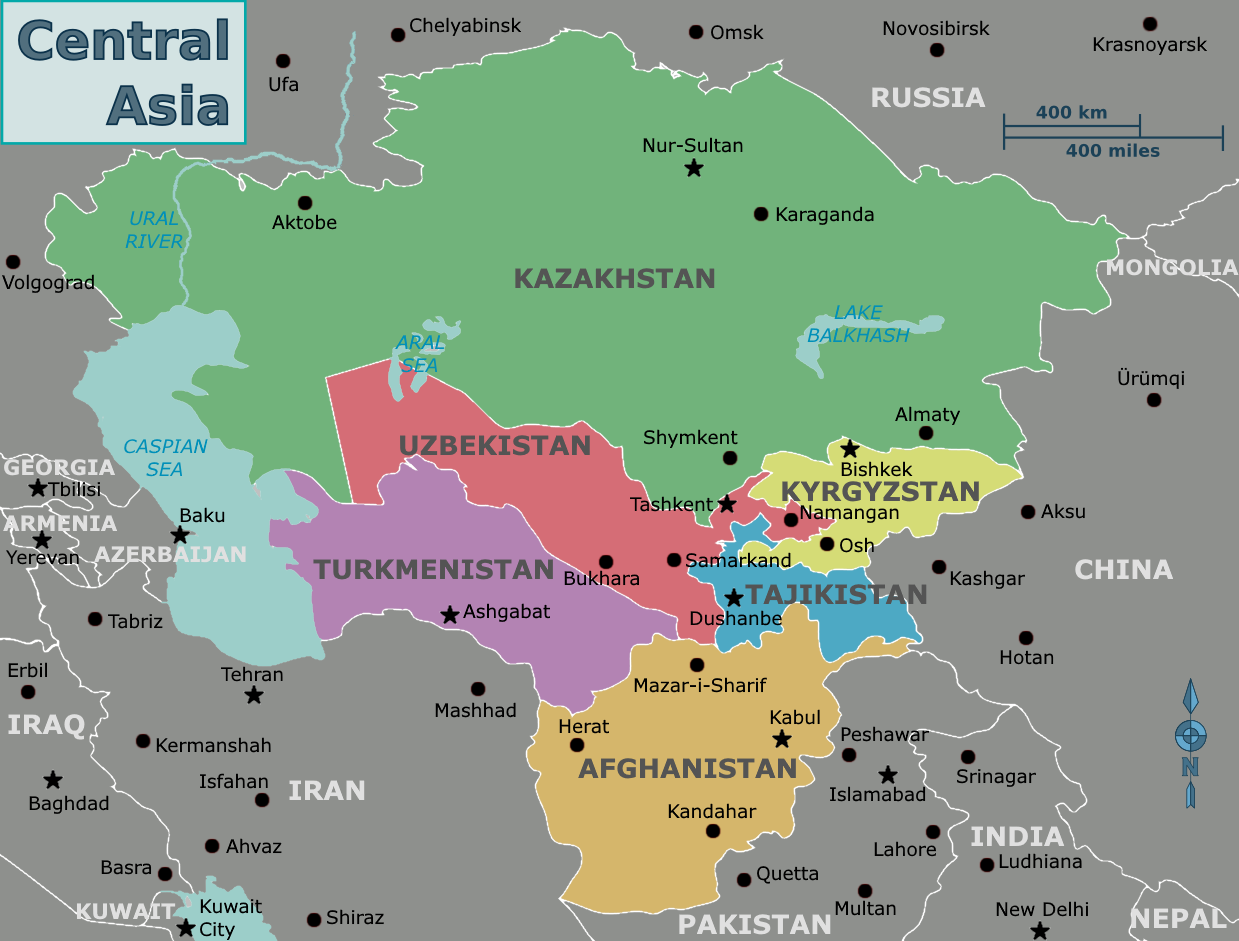
Map of the countries of Central Asia, Afghanistan (occasionally included), the Caspian Sea, and surrounding countries.

The nations which make up Central Asia are five of the former Soviet republics: Kazakhstan, Kyrgyzstan, Turkmenistan, Tajikistan, and Uzbekistan, which have a total population of about 76 million. Afghanistan is not always considered part of the region, but when it is, Central Asia has a total population of about 122 million (2016); Mongolia and Xinjiang (part of China) is also sometimes considered part of Central Asia due to its Central Asian cultural ties and traditions, although geographically it is East Asian. Most central Asians belong to religions which were introduced to the area within the last 1,500 years, such as Sunni Islam, Shia Islam, Ismaili Islam, Tengriism, and Syriac Christianity (mostly East Syriac). Buddhism, however, was introduced to Central Asia over 2,200 years ago, and Zoroastrianism, over 2,500 years ago.

== Ethnic groups ==
The below are demographic data on the ethnic groups in Central Asia.

Ethnic group	Center of population in Central Asia	Total roughly estimated population in Central Asia
Uzbek	Uzbekistan, Afghanistan, Tajikistan, Kyrgyzstan, Turkmenistan, Kazakhstan	36,000,000
Tajik	Tajikistan, Uzbekistan and Afghanistan. It includes the Pamiri people, who are officially categorized as Tajiks in Tajikistan.	25,000,000
Kazakh	Kazakhstan, Uzbekistan	17,500,000
Uyghur	Northwest China, Eastern Kazakhstan, Uzbekistan, Kyrgyzstan	13,000,000
Pashtun	Afghanistan	12,500,000
Dungan or Hui	Northwest China, Kyrgyzstan	10,500,000
Hazara	Afghanistan	6,500,000
Turkmen	Turkmenistan, Afghanistan, Iran	6,500,000
Kyrgyz	Kyrgyzstan	4,900,000
Russians	Kazakhstan, Uzbekistan, Kyrgyzstan	3,700,000
Mongolians	Mongolia, Kyrgyzstan	3,237,000
Aimak	Central and Northwest Afghanistan	1,500,000
Tatars	Uzbekistan	700,000
Baloch	Southern Afghanistan, Turkmenistan	600,000
Karakalpaks	North western Uzbekistan	500,000
Koreans	Kazakhstan, Uzbekistan	500,000
Ukrainians	Northern Kazakhstan	250,000
Nuristanis	Far eastern and northern Afghanistan	200,000+
Meskhetian Turks	Kazakhstan	200,000
Volga Germans	Kazakhstan	200,000
Belarusians	Northern Kazakhstan	100,000–200,000
Armenians	Turkmenistan, Uzbekistan	100,000
Azeri	Kazakhstan, Turkmenistan	100,000
Poles	Northern Kazakhstan	50,000–100,000
Chechens	Kazakhstan	40,000
Chuvash	Northern Kazakhstan	35,000
Bashkirs	Kazakhstan	30,000
Greeks	Kazakhstan	30,000
Moldovans	Kazakhstan	25,000
Mordvins	Kazakhstan	20,000
Romanians	Kazakhstan	20,000
Indians	Kazakhstan, Kyrgyzstan	19,500
Altai	Northern Kazakhstan	10,000
Arabs	Uzbekistan, Tajikistan	10,000
Bukharian Jews	Uzbekistan	1,500

== Genetic history ==
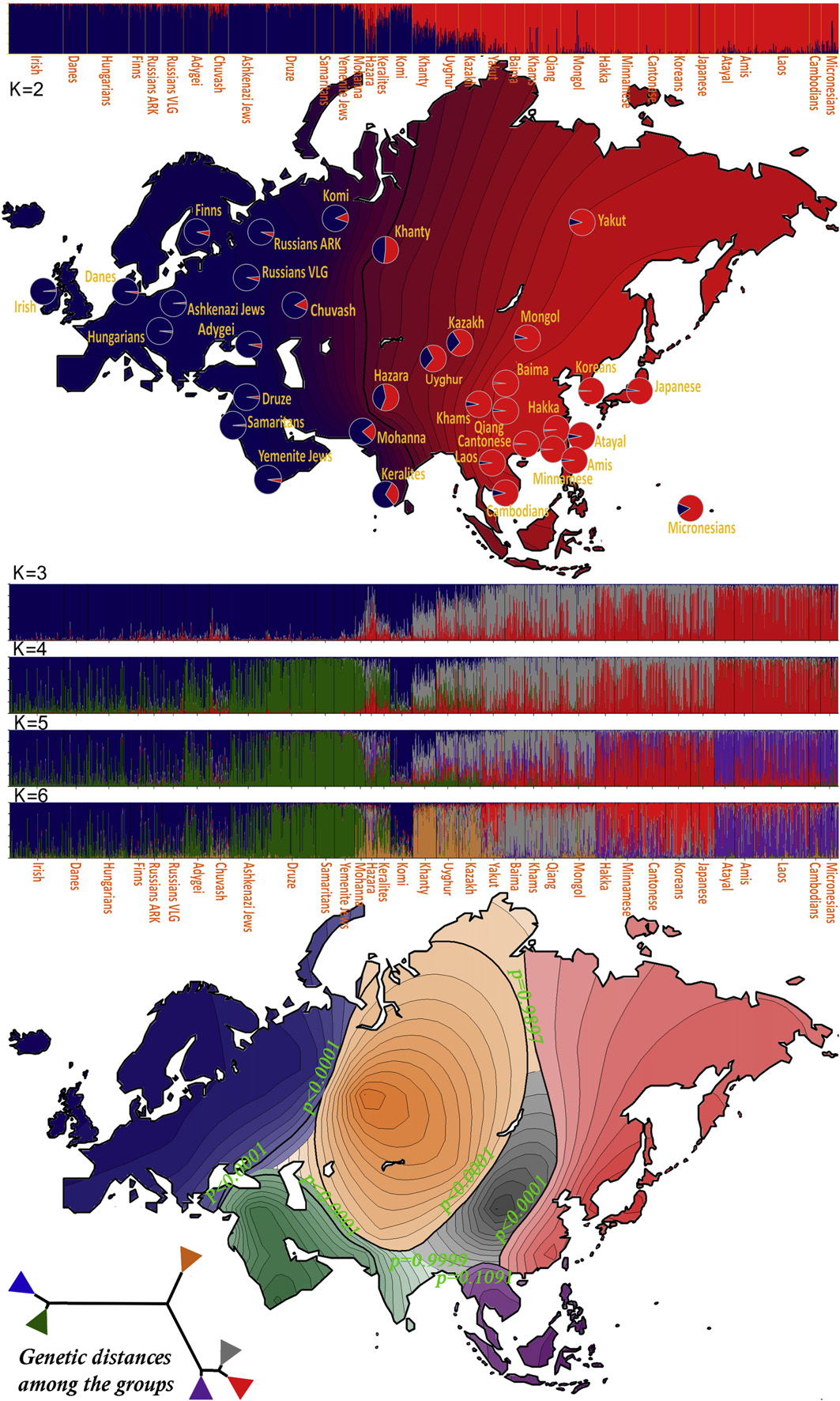
Genetic distance between different Eurasian populations and frequency of West- and East-Eurasian components.

An analysis of Scytho-Siberian matrilineal DNA lineages of Iron Age human remains from the Altai region found evidence of a mixture of West Eurasian and East Asian maternal lineages. Prior to the Iron Age, all ancient maternal lineages in the Altai region were of West Eurasian origin, however Iron Age specimens show that Western Eurasian lineages were reduced by 50%, and East Asian lineages increased by 50%. The authors suggested that the rise of East Asian mtDNA lineages likely happened within the Iron Age Scythian period.

The ancestry of modern Central Asian populations is significantly derived from later Indo-Iranian and Turkic populations.

A genetic study published in Nature in May 2018 examined the remains of four elite Türk soldiers buried between ca. 300 AD and 700 AD. 50% of the samples of Y-DNA belonged to the West Eurasian haplogroup R1, while the other 50% belonged to East Eurasian haplogroups Q and O. The extracted samples of mtDNA belonged mainly to East Eurasian haplogroups C4b1, A14 and A15c, while one specimen carried the West Eurasian haplogroup H2a. The authors suggested that Central Asian nomadic populations may have been Turkicized by East Asian elite minorities, resulting in a small but detectable increase in East Asian ancestry. However, these authors also found that Türkic period individuals were extremely genetically diverse, with some individuals being of near complete West Eurasian descent. To explain this diversity of ancestry, they propose that there were also incoming West Eurasians moving eastward on the Eurasian steppe during the Türkic period, resulting in admixture.

A 2020 study analyzed genetic data from 7 early medieval Türk skeletal remains from Eastern Turkic Khaganate burial sites in Mongolia. The authors described the Türk samples as highly diverse, carrying on average 40% West Eurasian, and 60% East Eurasian ancestry. West Eurasian ancestry in the Türks combined Sarmatian-related and BMAC ancestry, while the East Eurasian ancestry was related to Ancient Northeast Asians. The authors also observed that the Western Steppe Herder ancestry in the Türks was largely inherited from male ancestors, which also corresponds with the marked increase of paternal haplogroups such as R and J during the Türkic period in Mongolia. Admixture between East and West Eurasian ancestors of the Türkic samples was dated to 500 CE, or roughly 8 generations prior. Three of the Türkic-affiliated males carried the paternal haplogroups J2a and J1a, two carried haplogroup C-F3830, and one carried R1a-Z93. The analyzed maternal haplogroups were identified as D4, D2, B4, C4, H1 and U7.

Mongolians derive most of their ancestry from Ancient Northeast Asians (82–94%), with a variable amount of West Eurasian admixture (6-18%) from a Bronze Age Western Steppe Herder source, with Mongolians from Inner Mongolia having higher Ancient Northeast Asian component than Mongolians from Mongolia. Kazakhs derive around 65% of their ancestry from Eastern Eurasians and around 35% from Western Eurasians. Other studies model Kazakhs and Kyrgyz as a mixture of "Xinj_HE3"-related (44.8–58.9%) and "Mongolia_Xiongnu_o1"-related ancestries (41.1–55.2%), with the former component being ANE-rich. Uyghurs, Uzbeks and Turkmens can likewise be modeled as a mixture of "Turkmenistan_IA"-related (48.8–65.1%) and "Mongolia_Xiongnu_o1"-related (34.9–51.2%) components. Tajiks can be modeled as a mixture of Iranian farmer-related (43.8–52.8%), ANE-related(13.3–15.8%), Western European hunter-gatherer-related (9.5–11.8%), Baikal hunter-gatherer-related (7.7–17.1%), and Anatolian farmer-related (9.7–15.6%) ancestries. Some input from Andamanese-related groups is also detected.

A 2022 study stated that modern Central Asians can be divided into Indo-Iranian and Turko-Mongol groups; Indo-Iranian groups formed through admixture between local BMAC and Andronovo-related populations near the end of the Bronze Age and early Iron Age, coinciding with the end of the Oxus Civilization. They are also closely related to Iron Age Turkmenistan individuals, who have a mixture of Western Scandinavian Hunter-Gatherers/Eastern European Hunter-Gatherer (25%), Iranian Neolithic (30%) and Anatolian Farmer (35%) ancestries. Modern Indo-Iranian groups are largely continuous with these ancient groups but received some East Asian-related ancestry, represented by Baikal Hunter-Gatherer ancestry, from Turko-Mongol groups and South Asian-related ancestry, especially for Tajiks, after the Iron Age. Modern Turko-Mongol groups, in contrast, descend from Iron Age migrants to Central Asia and vary in their affinities to Indo-Iranian and ancient Baikal groups but on average, they receive 50% of their ancestry from Baikal Hunter-Gatherers and to a lesser extent, Han-related sources. Overall, the modern Yaghnobis can be used as proxies for the pre-Iron Age Indo-Iranian substrate although they received some Baikal Hunter-Gatherer ancestry that was absent in pre-Iron Age Central Asians.

== Religion ==
Religion	Approximate population	Center of population
Sunni Islam	103,000,000	South and East of region: Tajikistan, Turkmenistan, Kyrgyzstan, Uzbekistan, Afghanistan, Eastern Xinjiang, and Southern Kazakhstan. (most dense in Afghanistan and Uzbekistan)
Buddhism	9,084,000	700,000 and 1.5 million Buddhists in Russia, 8.44 million in Xinjiang, 140,000 people in Kazakhstan and Afghanistan; (Mongols, Koreans, Daur, Mongour, Tungusic peoples, Tibetans, Tuvans, Yugur)
Shia Islam	4,000,000	Hazaras, Afghanistan. While a significant number of them are Sunni.
Eastern Christianity	4,000,000	Mainly in northern Kazakhstan, significant communities are also located in the other four Soviet republics in the region.
Atheism and Irreligion	2,500,000+	Throughout the region
Western Christianity	510,000	Kazakhstan
Judaism	27,500	Uzbekistan (The Persianate Bukhara Jews)
Zoroastrianism	10,000	Historically Afghanistan, Tajikistan, and Uzbekistan (historical regions of Greater Iran in Persianate Central Asia)

== See also ==
- Demographics of Asia
- Indo-Aryan migration hypothesis
- Turkic migration
- History of the Jews in Central Asia

== Bibliography ==
- Guarino-Vignon, P., Marchi, N., Bendezu-Sarmiento, J. et al. Genetic continuity of Indo-Iranian speakers since the Iron Age in southern Central Asia. Sci Rep 12, 733 (2022). https://doi.org/10.1038/s41598-021-04144-4
