= Azerbaijan Society of America =

US organization for Azerbaijani diaspora

- Amerika Azərbaycan Cəmiyyəti (Azerbaijani)
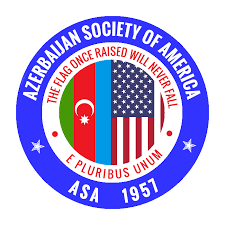
- Abbreviation: ASA
- Formation: 1957
- Founder: Saleh bey Sheikhzamanli
- Type: non-profit NGO
- Headquarters: Newark, New Jersey
- Leader: Tomris Azeri
- Website: https://azsociety.org/

Azerbaijan Society of America (Azerbaijani: Amerika Azərbaycan Cəmiyyəti, آمریکا آذربایجان جمعیتی; abbreviated ASA) is one of the oldest and most significant cultural and educational organizations of the Azerbaijani diaspora in the United States. It is a non-profit organization located in Newark, New Jersey.

The mission of the association is to preserve the cultural, ethnic, and religious interests of the Azerbaijani Americans.

The organization's motto is the quote from the famous Azerbaijani political figure Mammad Emin Rasulzade: «Once raised, the flag will never be lowered!» (Azerbaijani: Bir kərə yüksələn bayraq, bir daha enməz! / !بیر کره یوکسلن بایراق،بیر داها یئره ائنمز).

== History ==
The society was founded in 1957 by Azerbaijani political émigré Saleh Bey Sheikhzamanli. The Sheikhzamanli family emigrated to the United States following the fall of the Azerbaijan Democratic Republic (ADR) and the end of World War II. Saleh Bey's father, Naghi Sheykhzamanli, served as Minister of National Security in the government of the Azerbaijan Democratic Republic from 1918 to 1920. The association was established as a platform for émigrés to preserve their language, cultural traditions, and historical identity in the United States.

Initially, the organization primarily brought together Azerbaijanis who had fled the Soviet Union. Over time, its membership expanded to include immigrants from Iran, including those who left during the Pahlavi era and following the Iranian Revolution.

Following the dissolution of the Soviet Union in 1991, the association shifted its focus toward strengthening diplomatic, economic, and cultural ties between Azerbaijan and the United States, particularly between Baku and Washington, D.C., as well as Ganja and Newark.

In 2006, the organization's chairperson, Tomris Azeri, was awarded the Order of Glory by the President of Azerbaijan, Ilham Aliyev.

Since 2010, the association has organized ceremonial raisings of the Azerbaijani tricolor flag in New York City, including at Bowling Green Park, and in Philadelphia to mark Azerbaijan's Independence Day.

The organization also played a role in advocacy efforts that contributed to the passage of the New York State Senate's first resolution recognizing the March 1918 events in Baku.

In 2012, the association celebrated its 55th anniversary alongside Azerbaijani independence Day with a commemorative event in New York City at the Empire State Building.

== Missions ==
- Achievement of harmony and understanding between the peoples of Azerbaijan and the United States of America.
- Union of the diverse communities and welcome members of different faiths.
- Building an active and lasting friendship, based on mutual understanding, between the peoples of the United States and Azerbaijan.
- Promotion of cultural, commercial, technical, and educational exchanges between the United States and Azerbaijan.
- Teaching children and adolescents the Azerbaijani language and customs.
- Development of interest in and appreciation of the Azerbaijani language, customs, music, dance, and art by organizing and hosting public concerts, dance performances, and exhibitions, and by providing information to the public about the history and development of these art forms.
- Providing of accessible forums and structures within which participants can exchange views and formulate and implement coordinated programs that reflect their shared interests and concerns.
- Promotion of the implementation of civil society initiatives, both public and private.
