= Ella Leya =

American composer, singer

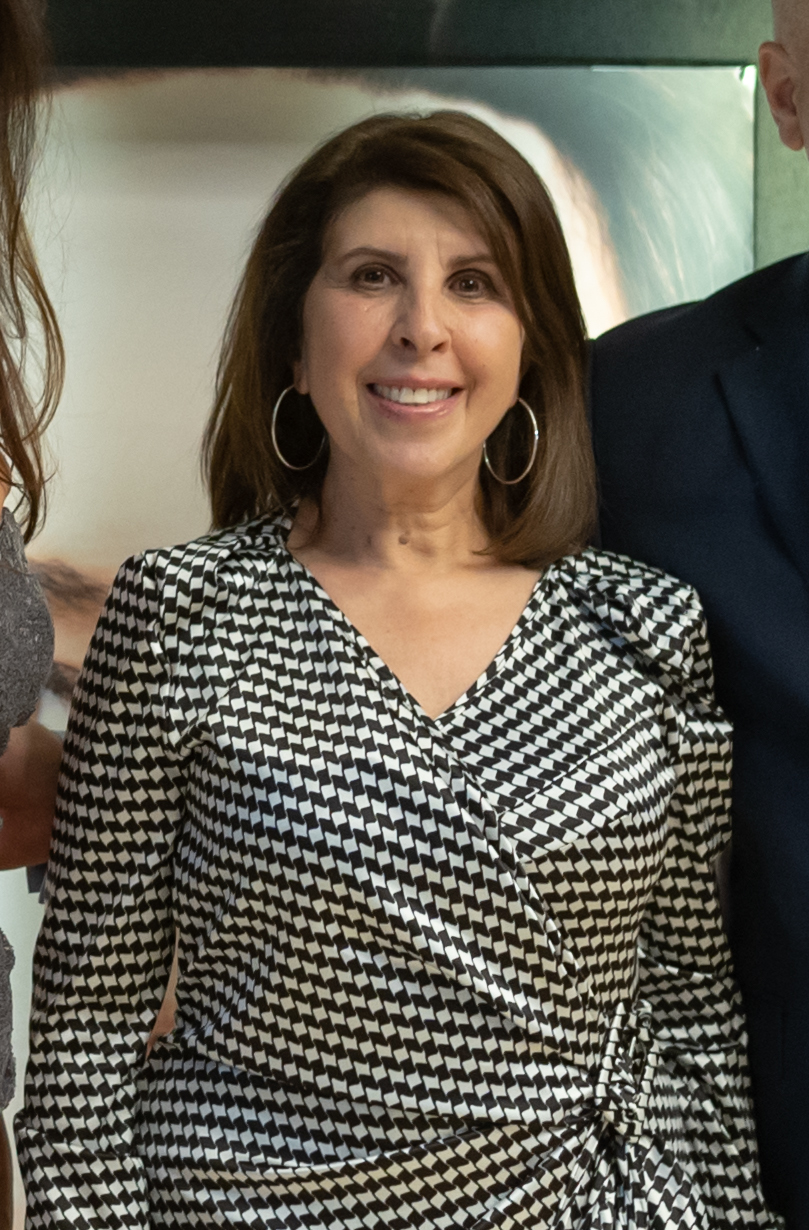
- Leya in 2022

Background information
- Born: Azerbaijan
- Genres: Jazz; World; Pop; Classical
- Occupation(s): Singer; Songwriter; Composer; Writer
- Instrument(s): Vocals; Piano
- Years active: 1998 — present
- Labels: B-Elite Music
- Website: www.ellaleya.com

Ella Leya is an American composer, singer, and writer born in Baku, Azerbaijan.

Her album releases include "Queen of Night," "Russian Romance" and "Secret Lives of Women."

"Queen of Night" — and especially the songs Kabbalistic Prayer and He’s Just A Little Boy — was a tribute to the memory of her son Sergey.

"Russian Romance" dug into her cultural heritage, combining classic Russian poetry, Middle Eastern rhythms and her atmospheric melodies.

"Secret Lives of Women" celebrates six of history’s most famous and infamous femme fatales: Princess Diana * Mata Hari * Cleopatra * Anne Boleyn * Sappho * Sarah Bernhardt.

Ella Leya has toured with her Jazz orchestra SELAH across Europe and the United States.

Her songs have appeared in various movies and TV shows, such as Ocean's Twelve, PU-239, My Sassy Girl, Dirty Sexy Money, Samantha Who.

Ella Leya's debut novel "The Orphan Sky" was published in 2015.
