= Chingiz Sadykhov =

Soviet-Azerbaijani musician (1929–2017)

Chingiz Sadykhov Çingiz Sadıxov
- Also known as: Chingiz Sadikhov, Chingiz Sadighov
- Born: April 5, 1929; Baku, Azerbaijan SSR, Soviet Union
- Died: December 30, 2017 (aged 88) California, United States
- Occupation: Pianist

Chingiz Sadykhov (Azerbaijani: Çingiz Sadıxov), also spelled Sadikhov or Sadighov (5 April 1929, in Baku – 30 December 2017, in California), was a Soviet and Azerbaijani musician and pianist. He was active in Baku and San Francisco.

== Biography ==
He graduated from Bul-Bul Musical School in Baku and Azerbaijani State Conservatory. Mr. Sadykhov further studied for PhD degree at Moscow Conservatory under Professor Goldenveyser. Then he returned to Baku where he lived until 1994 before migrating to the United States. He resided in San Francisco.

Initially Chingiz Sadykhov played classical music but later switched to Azerbaijani music. He has spent much of his life accompanying Azerbaijan's most prominent singers, including Bulbul, the founder of Azerbaijan's professional vocal school; Rashid Behbudov, the singer who most often represented Azerbaijan throughout the world during the Soviet period; Lutfiyar Imanov, a Soviet and Azerbaijani opera singer; Mirza Babayev, an Azerbaijani movie actor and singer; and Muslim Magomayev, one of the former Soviet Union's best-known pop stars. When asked how many songs are in his repertoire, Chingiz readily admitted that there were so many that he wouldn't know where to start counting.

== Albums ==
- Songs Of Azerbaijan (1998)
- Piano Music Of Azerbaijan (2003)
- Muzik Of Azerbaijan (2006)
