= Ida Pavlichenko =

Azerbaijani biomedical engineer

- Born: c. 1987; Azerbaijan
- Education: Lomonosov Moscow State University; LMU Munich; Harvard University
- Known for: PionEar Technologies - designing intelligent medical devices for treating ear infections
- Awards: 2019 MIT Technology Review Innovators Under 35, 2018 Bertarelli Prize Winner,
- Scientific career
- Fields: Biomedical engineering
- Workplaces: Wyss Institute for Biologically Inspired Engineering

Ida Pavlichenko (born c. 1987) is an Azerbaijani biomedical engineer and a Technology Development Fellow at the Harvard University Wyss Institute for Biologically Inspired Engineering. Pavlichenko is the co-founder and chief executive officer of PionEar Technologies, a medical device company that develops intelligent technologies for treating ear and hearing disorders. The tympanostomy technology she invented for treating recurrent ear infections has been nationally recognized for its innovative design which addresses many of the limitations of current ear tubes.

== Early life and education ==
Pavlichenko was born in Azerbaijan. Pavlichenko completed her Master of Science in physics at the Lomonosov Moscow State University in Russia, graduating summa cum laude in 2010. Working under the mentorship of Aziz M. Muzafarov, Pavlichenko pioneered the design of novel multi-arm star-like polymethylsiloxane polymers. They explored the behavior and characterized the properties of these nano-sized molecules at the air-water interface.

At the completion of her Master's, Pavlichenko won the IDK-NBT fellowship which she used to pursue her graduate training in Inorganic Chemistry at LMU Munich in Germany. During her time at the Max Planck Institute for Solid State Research at LMU, Pavlichenko studied under the mentorship of Bettina V. Lotsch and worked to develop novel highly sensitive photonic crystals that could detect chemical and physical stimuli. Photonic crystals are incredible structures that reflect only highly specific wavelengths of light due to the periodically arranged nanostructure of the photonic crystals. Since the structure is at the sub-nanometer scale, small changes are detected as dramatic changes in the colour of light reflected. Pavlichenko and her team harnessed this unique property of photonic crystals and began to design them such that they would absorb specific types of molecules and thus act as sensors for the presence of these molecules in the environment. One type of sensor she designed was a thermally tunable and environmentally responsive 1D photonic crystal. The mesoporous structure led to highly sensitive changes in refractive index based on humidity and was capable of producing a dramatic spectral shift within a humidity range of 25% to 55%. The opportunity to create a sensing platform with an optical readout would revolutionize the speed and accuracy of diagnosis and detection and potentially be more affordable than current sensor technologies. Pavlichenko's thesis was titled “Stimuli-responsive photonic sensors: Towards an integrated electrophotonic detection platform”.

== Career and research ==
After completing her graduate training in 2014, Pavlichenko began her postdoctoral fellowship at Harvard University in the lab of Joanna Aizenberg at the John A. Paulson School of Engineering and Applied Sciences. During her postdoc, Pavlichenko developed novel biologically inspired medical devices and was the co-inventor on several patents. She began her time in the lab applying her knowledge of AI-based photonic sensors towards the development of novel medical devices. Point-of-care diagnostics are an important focus of healthcare innovation as they provide rapid testing and results to enable more informed care and speedier recovery. Photonic crystals can be incorporated in the development of point-of-care diagnostics as they can be designed to provide optical outputs in the presence of specific analytes.

In 2018, Pavlichenko co-founded PionEar, a medical device company that creates liquid-infused tympanostomy tubes that can help to relieve inflammation, fluids, infection, and pain in the middle ear due to ear infections. Pavlichenko was inspired to create these devices as her young daughter was suffering from recurrent ear infections, like many young children do, and she wanted a better solution compared to the often ineffective ear tubes that physicians are limited to using to treat earn infections. Typical ear tube technology often gets infected, the tubes are pre-maturely extruded from the ear, can become clogged, and re-insertion often lead to scarring later in life. Her technology addresses the limitations of current ear tubes in that it is customizable, can be used to administer drugs yet does not let in water and fluids that might cause infection, and due to its liquid-filled polymer based fabrication it has reduced biofouling. Since their technology is 3D printed to fit each ear, it stays in the ear and the patient suffers less scarring from re-implantation. Pavlichenko and her team used the support of the Harvard University Innovation Labs (iLabs) in order to support their entrepreneurial endeavours and now, Pavlichenko is dedicated to continuing entrepreneurial work.

Pavlichenko was promoted to Technology Development Fellow at the Wyss Institute at Harvard and is the chief executive officer of PionEar. After winning the Bertarelli Prize, along with several other Massachusetts- and Harvard-based innovation prizes, Pavlichenko and her team will soon begin to commercialize the technology and begin its testing in animals and then patients.

== Awards and honors ==
- 2019 MIT Technology Review Innovators Under 35
- 2018 Gold Prize at the MassChallenge Boston
- 2018 Collegiate Innovators Competition by the National Hall of Fame and the United States Patent and Trademark Office
- 2018 Audience Choice Grand Prize at the 115th Mass Innovation Nights
- 2018 Bertarelli Prize Winner
- 2018 Grand Prize in the Health and Life Sciences Track at the Harvard President's Innovation Challenge for development of PionEar Venture
- 2016 MIT Impact Program Fellow

== Select publications ==
- Nanomorphology tuning of the thermal response of TiO_{2}/SiO_{2} Bragg stacks. Ida Pavlichenko, Armin T. Exner, Gennady Logvenov, Giuseppe Scarpa, Paolo Lugli, Bettina V. Lotsch. Canadian Journal of Chemistry, 2012, 90:1069-1077, https://doi.org/10.1139/v2012-081
- Pavlichenko, I., Exner, A. T., Lugli, P., Scarpa, G., & Lotsch, B. V. (2013). Tunable thermoresponsive TiO_{2}/SiO_{2} Bragg stacks based on sol–gel fabrication methods. Journal of Intelligent Material Systems and Structures, 24(18), 2204–2214. https://doi.org/10.1177/1045389X12453970
- Yetisen, Ali & Butt, Haider & Volpatti, Lisa & Pavlichenko, Ida & Humar, Matjaž & Kwok, Sheldon & Koo, Heebeom & Kim, Ki Su & Naydenova, Izabela & Khademhosseini, Ali & Hahn, Sei & Yun, Seok. (2015). Photonic hydrogel sensors. Biotechnology advances. 34. 10.1016/j.biotechadv.2015.10.005.
- Ranft, Annekathrin & Pavlichenko, Ida & Szendrei, Katalin & Zehetmaier, Peter & Hu, Yinghong & von Mankowski, Olaf Alberto & Lotsch, Bettina. (2015). 1D photonic defect structures based on colloidal porous frameworks: Reverse pore engineering and vapor sorption. Microporous and Mesoporous Materials. 216. 10.1016/j.micromeso.2015.05.031.
