= Elariz Mammadoğlu =

Azerbaijani singer (born 1964)

Elariz Məmmədoghlu
- Born: 17 December 1964 (age 60); Baku, Azerbaijani SSR, Soviet Union
- Origin: Baku
- Genres: Rock n' Roll
- Years active: 1997 - present

Elariz Mammadoghlu (Azerbaijani: Elariz Məmmədoğlu) (born 17 December 1964, Baku) is an Azerbaijani singer.

== Personal life ==
Elariz Mammadoghlu was born on 17 December 1964. He attended Huseyn Javid Secondary School #132, and was a soloist in the choir. In 1982, he joined the faculty of directing the Mirzagha Aliyev State Art Institute. From a period of 1983 to 1985, he sang in military bases in Leningrad, Petrozavodsk, and Murmansk.

== Career ==
Elariz started composing songs since he was 7 years old, but started performing when he was 16. From 1992 to 1994, he performed as a musician, and has continued to sing from 1994 on. He began professional singing in 1997. He is a lyrical tenor and has an extensive repertoire. Elariz also sings in the folk pop genre, and is able to sing in multiple languages.

In 2018, he won a green card lottery and moved to the US, where he works as a singer in Baku restaurant.

== Discography ==
- 2000:
- Devuşka v pesoçnom sarafane
- Tup-Tup
- 2001:
- Dans-Dans
- 2002:
- Abşeron torpağı
- 2003:
- Guya
- Doroqa

== Filmography ==
- Bir dəfə Qafqazda (film, 2007)
- Kişiləri qoruyun (film, 2006)
- Qış nağılı. I film (film, 2002)
- Məhəllə (film, 2003)
- Məşədi İbad-94 (film, 2005)
- "Moskva-Bakı" qatarı (film, 2005)
- Oyunçu (film, 2008)
- Yanmış körpülər (film, 2003)
