= Izabela Naydenova =

Bulgarian holography researcher

Izabela Naydenova is a Bulgarian researcher in holography, holographic materials and nanostructures, and holographic sensors. She is a professor at Technological University Dublin, where she is head of discipline for physics and clinical measurement science in the School of Physics, Clinical and Optometric Sciences, and scientific director of the Centre for Industrial and Engineering Optics.

== Education and career ==
Naydenova studied applied optics at Sofia University, graduating in 1993. She completed a Ph.D. in physics through the Bulgarian Academy of Sciences in 1999.

After three years of postdoctoral research at the Technical University of Munich, she came to the Dublin Institute of Technology (now Technological University Dublin) for a second term of postdoctoral research, as an Arnold F. Graves fellow. She became a lecturer at the institute in 2008, a professor in 2017, and scientific director of the Centre for Industrial and Engineering Optics in 2021.

== Recognition ==
Naydenova was named as a 2023 Optica Fellow, "for contributions to holographic materials, sensors, and modeling, and outstanding service to the community".
