= Demographics of Asia =

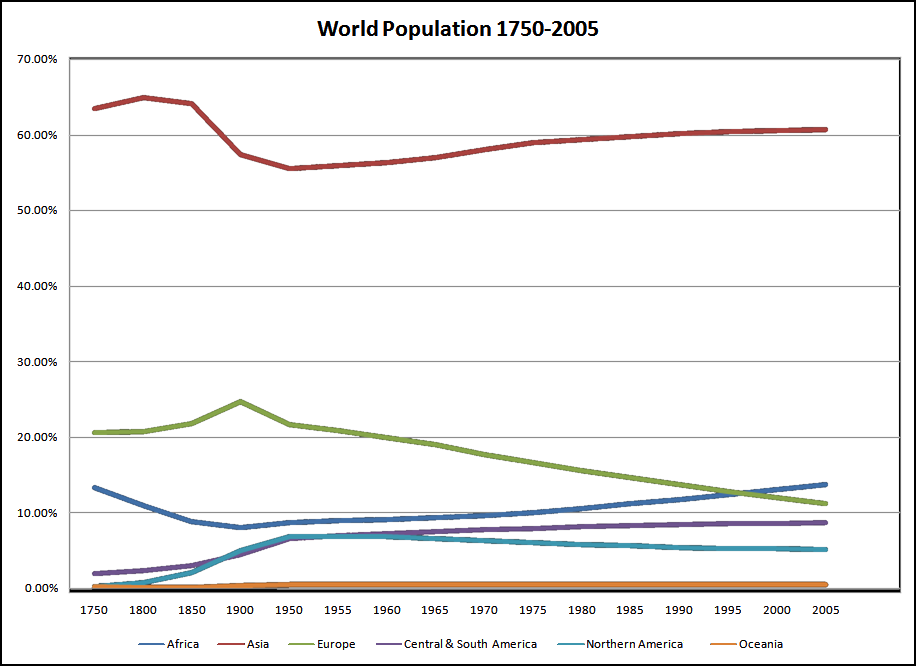
Graph showing population by continent as a percentage of world population (1750–2005)

Map of countries by population density

The continent of Asia covers 29.4% of the Earth's land area and has a population of around 4.87 billion (as of 2022), accounting for about 60% of the world population. The combined population of both China and India is estimated to be over 2.8 billion people as of 2022. Asia's population is projected to grow to 5.25 billion by 2055, or about 54% of projected world population at that time. Population growth in Asia was close to 0.55% p.a. as of 2022, with highly disparate rates. Many Western Asian and South Asian countries have growth rates far above the world average, notably Pakistan at 2% p.a., and India with a 0.6% increase in 2022. On the other hand, East Asian nations are in the middle of a demographic stagnation, with China experiencing a small decrease of –0.06%, after years of rapidly slowing growth.

== Population ==
Asia population pyramid in 2023 based on the United Nations geoscheme for Asia

=== History ===
==== Population of Asia, 1–1820 AD (in millions) ====
Source: Maddison et al.

Year	1	1000	1500	1600	1700	1820
China	59.6	59.0	103.0	160.0	138.0	381.0
India	75.0	75.0	110.0	135.0	165.0	209.0
Japan	3.0	7.5	15.4	18.5	27.0	31.0
Korea	1.6	3.9	8.0	10.0	12.2	13.8
Indonesia	2.8	5.2	10.7	11.7	13.1	17.9
Indochina	1.1	2.2	4.5	5.0	5.9	8.9
Other East Asia	5.9	9.8	14.4	16.9	19.8	23.6
Iran	4.0	4.5	4.0	5.0	5.0	6.6
Turkey	6.1	7.3	6.3	7.9	8.4	10.1
Other West Asia	15.1	8.5	7.5	8.5	7.4	8.5
Total Asia	174.2	182.9	283.8	378.5	401.8	710.4

==== Shares of world population, Asia, 1–1998 AD (percent of world total) ====
Source: Maddison et al.

Year	1	1000	1500	1600	1700	1820	1870	1913	1950	1973	1999
China	25.8	22.0	23.5	28.8	22.9	36.6	28.2	24.4	21.7	22.5	21.0
India	32.5	28.0	25.1	24.3	27.3	20.1	19.9	17.0	14.2	14.8	16.5
Japan	1.3	2.8	3.5	3.3	4.5	3.0	2.7	2.9	3.3	2.8	2.1
Other Asia	15.9	15.4	12.7	11.7	11.9	8.6	9.4	10.3	15.5	17.3	19.8
Total Asia (excluding Japan)	74.2	65.4	61.3	64.8	62.1	65.3	57.5	51.7	51.4	54.7	57.4
World	100.0	100.0	100.0	100.0	100.0	100.0	100.0	100.0	100.0	100.0	100.0

== Countries ranking by international organisations ==
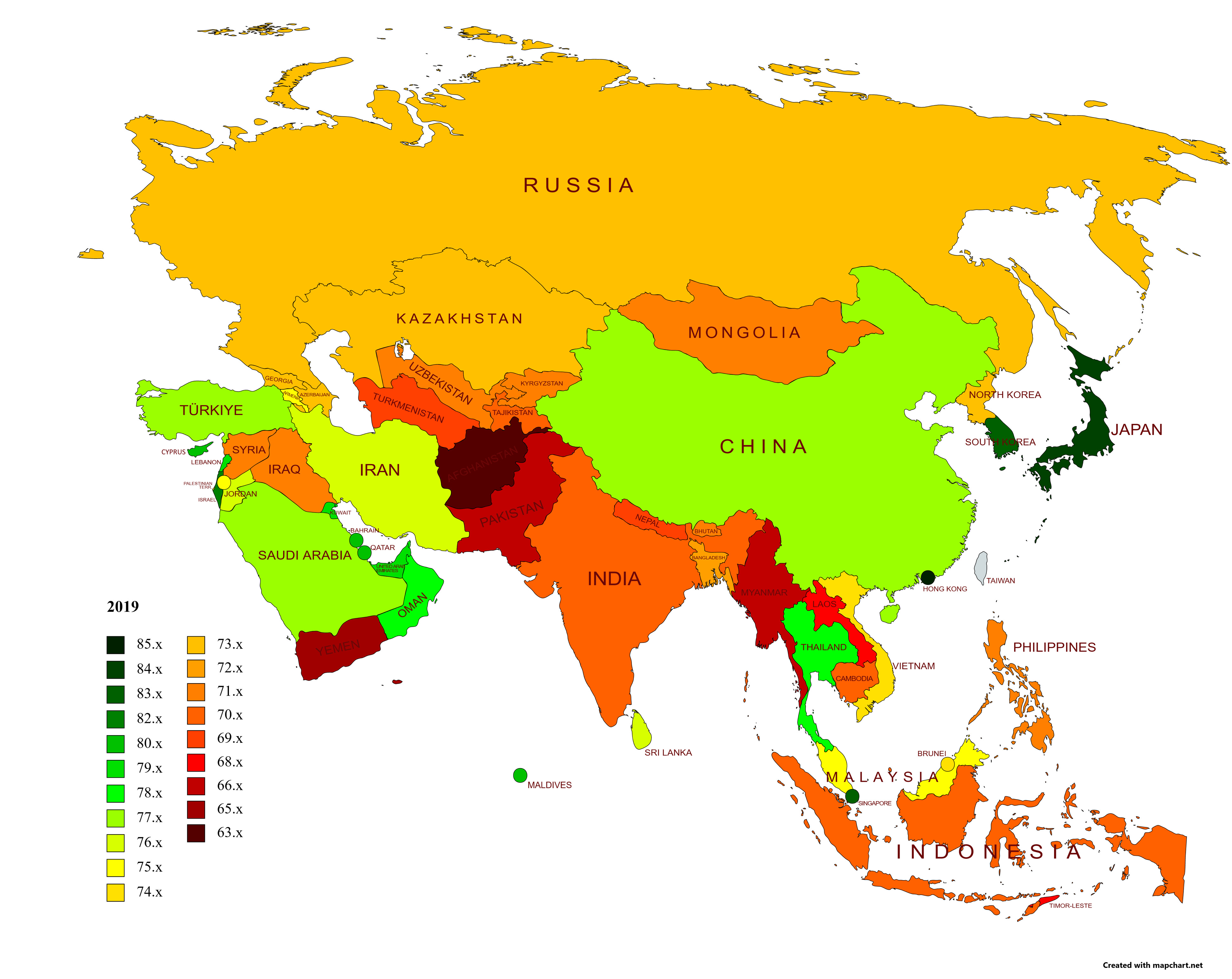
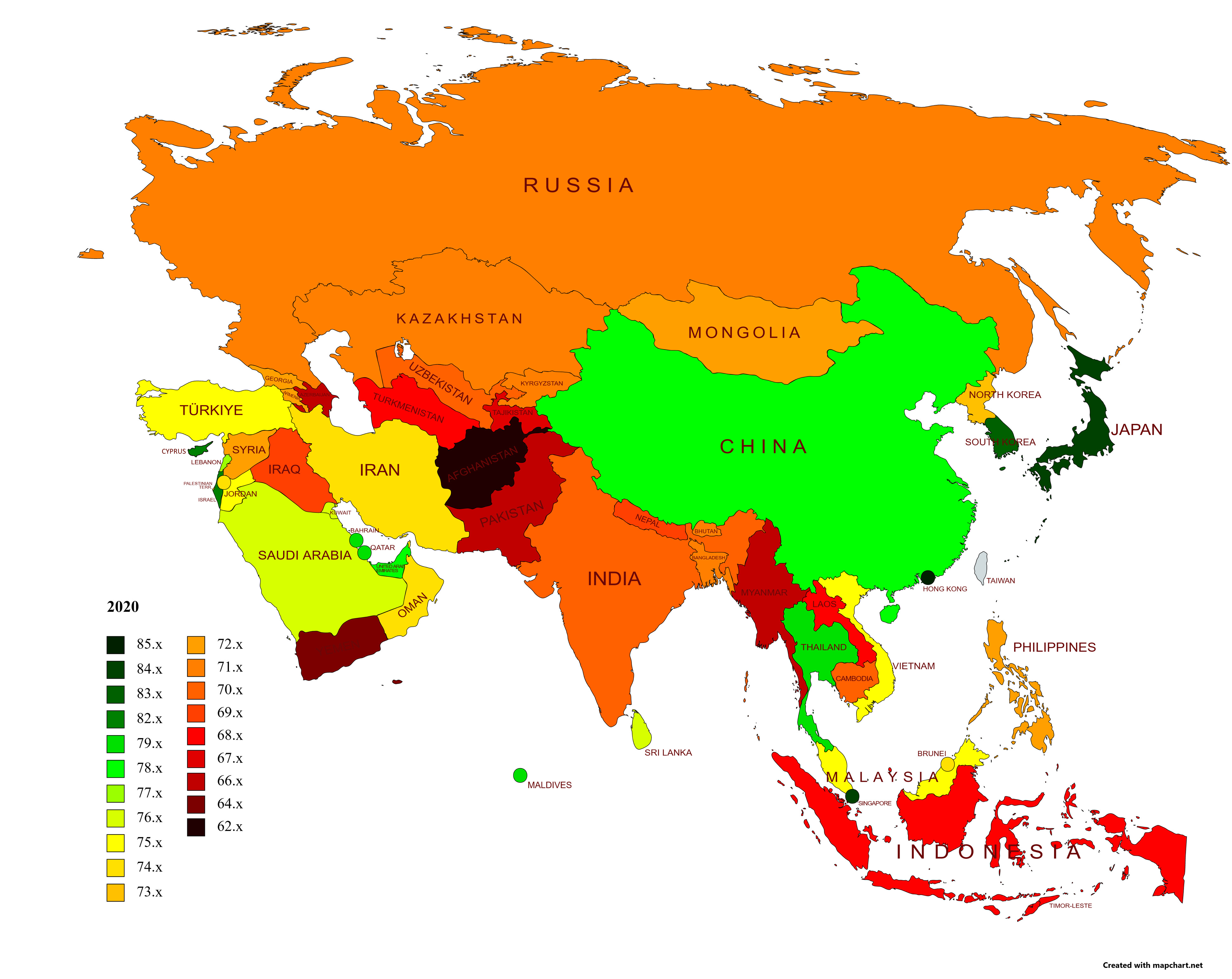
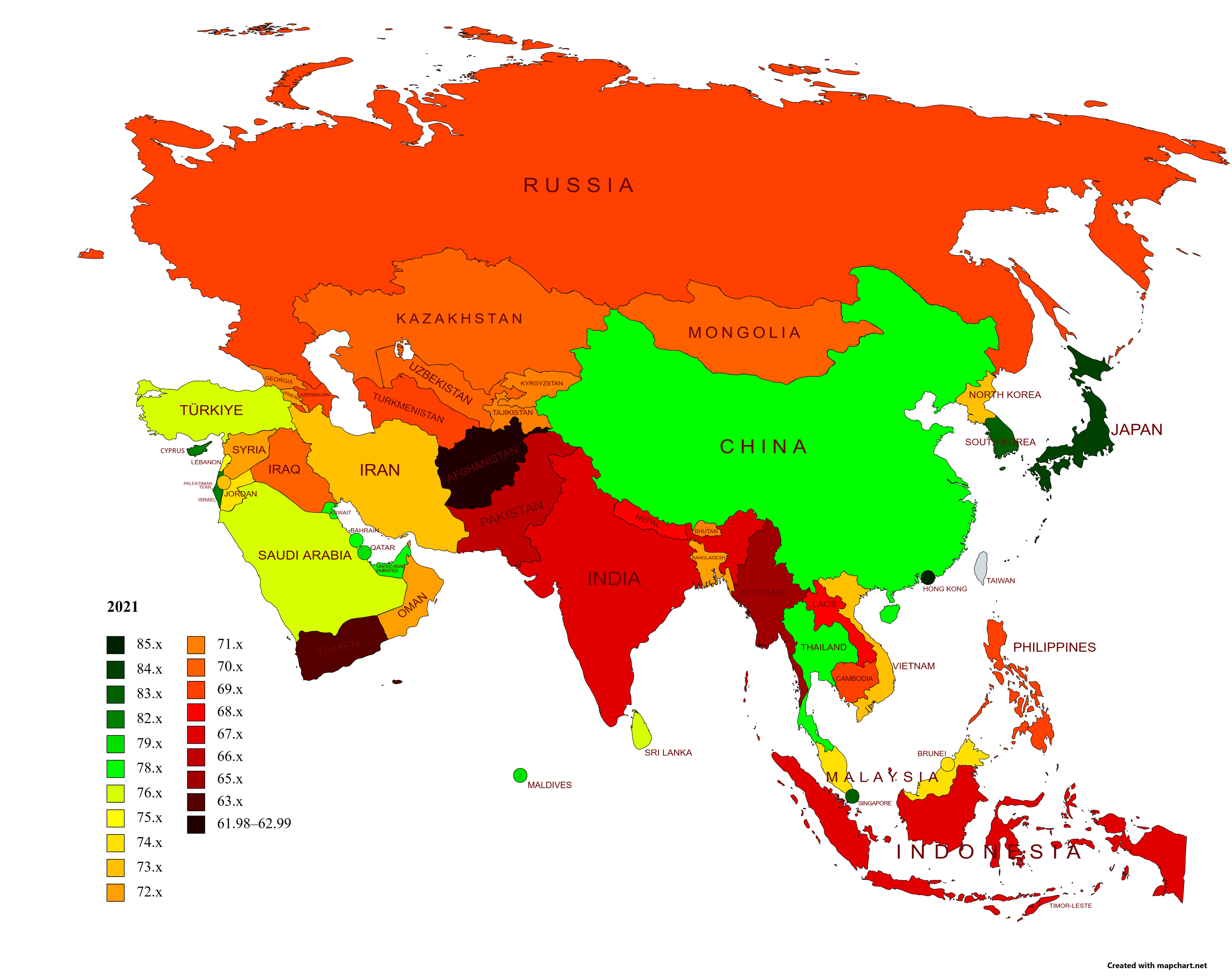
Life expectancy in Asia in 2019–2021, according to the World Bank Group

2024 World Population Prospects by the United Nations Population Division
Countries	Population (Thousands)	TFR	Population Growth Rate (percentage)	Life Expectancy at birth (years)	Median Age as of 1 July (years)	Net Migration Rate (per 1000 people)
India	1,444,436.244	1.96	0.90	72.2	28.4	−0.4
China	1,420,909	1.01	−0.22	78.0	39.6	−0.2
Indonesia	282,354	2.12	0.80	71.3	30.1	−0.1
Pakistan	249,336	3.55	1.54	67.8	20.4	−5.6
Bangladesh	172,507	2.14	1.22	74.9	25.7	−2.7
Japan	124,071	1.22	−0.51	84.9	49.4	1.2
Philippines	115,371	1.89	0.82	69.9	25.7	−1.4
Vietnam	100,675	1.90	0.62	74.7	32.9	−0.6
Iran	91,115	1.68	0.99	77.9	33.4	2.1
Turkey	87,372	1.62	0.23	77.4	33.0	−3.2
Thailand	71,689	1.20	−0.06	76.6	40.1	0.3
Myanmar	54,320	2.10	0.66	67.1	29.8	−0.7
South Korea	51,738	0.73	−0.08	84.4	45.1	1.5
Iraq	45,558	3.22	2.10	72.4	20.6	−0.4
Afghanistan	42,045	4.76	2.83	66.3	17.1	−1.0
Saudi Arabia	33,661	2.31	1.78	79.0	29.6	3.6
Uzbekistan	36,010	3.49	1.93	72.5	27.0	−0.2
Malaysia	35,344	1.54	1.20	76.8	30.5	4.9
Yemen	39,987	4.50	2.94	69.4	18.3	−0.3
Nepal	29,674	1.96	−0.15	70.6	25.0	−13.5
North Korea	26,460	1.78	0.29	73.7	36.3	−0.1
Sri Lanka	23,038	1.95	0.56	77.7	33.1	−1.2
Syria	24,175	2.70	4.04	72.6	22.8	22.2
Kazakhstan	20,464	2.98	1.25	74.5	29.6	−0.4
Cambodia	17,533	2.55	1.20	70.8	26.0	−1.9
Jordan	11,531	2.60	0.38	78.0	24.5	−13.5
Azerbaijan	10,305	1.67	0.62	74.6	33.1	1.1
Tajikistan	10,492	3.04	1.87	71.9	22.1	−2.0
Israel	9,322	2.79	1.39	82.7	29.2	1.1
United Arab Emirates	10,839	1.21	3.41	83.1	31.6	25.3
Laos	7,718	2.40	1.34	69.2	24.6	−1.3
Hong Kong (China)	7,433	0.73	−0.49	85.6	46.8	−2.6
Kyrgyzstan	7,131	2.78	1.54	71.8	25.3	0.5
Turkmenistan	7,431	2.66	1.70	70.2	26.6	2.0
Singapore	5,812	0.95	0.68	83.9	35.7	3.4
Lebanon	5,786	2.23	0.70	77.9	28.6	−3.0
Oman	5,165	2.51	4.41	80.2	29.5	29.2
Kuwait	4,884	1.52	2.04	80.6	34.8	12.5
Georgia	3,808	1.80	−0.01	74.7	37.0	0.5
Mongolia	3,454	2.63	1.22	72.0	26.9	0.0
Armenia	2,984	1.72	−0.71	75.8	36.1	−10.1
Qatar	3,012	1.72	2.36	82.5	33.6	15.1
Bahrain	1,588	1.81	2.40	81.4	33.2	14.1
East Timor	1,392	2.63	1.27	67.9	21.3	−1.8
Cyprus	1,352	1.38	0.95	81.8	38.2	6.0
Bhutan	789	1.45	0.61	73.3	29.9	−0.4
Macau (China)	719	0.68	0.39	83.2	38.9	2.2
Maldives	527	1.56	0.36	81.3	31.9	−4.6
Brunei	461	1.73	0.80	75.5	32.2	0
Asia	4,792,493	1.88	0.60	74.8	32.1	−0.5
Population Replacement		2.1				

== Socioeconomics ==
A choropleth map showing Asian countries by Human Development Index, based on 2019 data from the 2020 Human Development Report. ≥ 0.900 0.850–0.899 0.800–0.849 0.750–0.799 0.700–0.749 0.650–0.699 0.600–0.649 0.550–0.599 0.500–0.549 0.450–0.499 0.400–0.449 ≤ 0.399 Data unavailable

Asia is home to some of the world's largest economies, including China, India, Japan, South Korea, Indonesia, Turkey, and Saudi Arabia, several of which are members of the G20 and BRICS. Economic and social development varies significantly across the continent.

The Human Development Index (HDI) provides a broad measure of socioeconomic well-being, combining income, life expectancy, and education. Across Asia, HDI scores range from very high in countries such as Hong Kong, Singapore, and South Korea, to lower levels in parts of South and Southeast Asia. The table below shows the 10 highest and lowest HDI scores in the region.

10 highest HDIs

Rank	Country	HDI
Rank	Country	2023 data (2025 report) rankings
Very high human development
1	Hong Kong	0.955
2	Singapore	0.946
3	United Arab Emirates	0.940
4	South Korea	0.937
3	Japan	0.925
5	Israel	0.919
7	Cyprus	0.913
8	Saudi Arabia	0.900
9	Bahrain	0.899
10	Qatar	0.886

10 lowest HDIs

Rank	Country	HDI
Rank	Country	2018 data (2019 report) rankings
Low human development
1	Yemen	0.455
2	Afghanistan	0.478
3	Pakistan	0.544
Medium human development
4	Syria	0.577
5	Myanmar	0.585
6	Cambodia	0.593
7	Nepal	0.602
8	East Timor	0.607
9	Laos	0.607
10	India	0.633

== Ethnicities ==
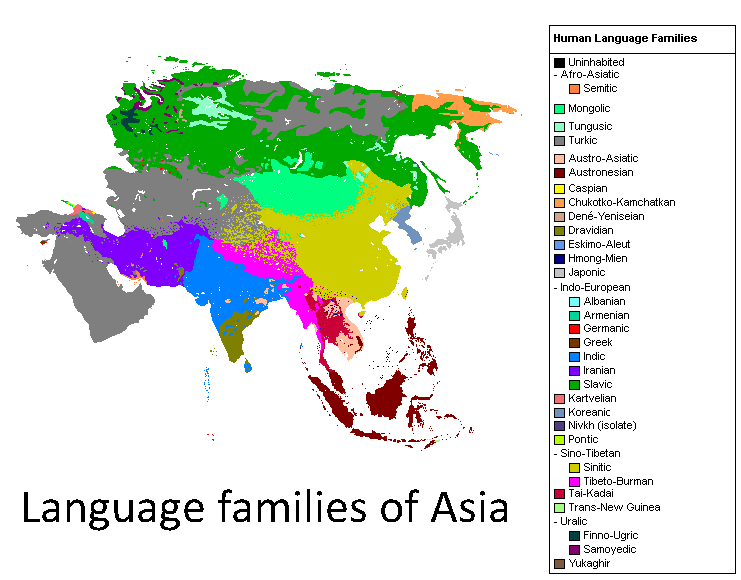
The language families of Asia

- Central Asian peoples: Turkic peoples, Iranian peoples
- East Asian peoples: List of Chinese ethnic groups (historical), Japanese people, Koreans, Mongols
- South Asian peoples: Ethnic groups of India, Ethnic groups in Pakistan, Dravidians, Indo-Aryans, Munda people
- Southeast Asian peoples: Austronesian peoples, Tai peoples; List of ethnic groups in Cambodia, ethnic groups in Indonesia, List of ethnic groups in Laos, Ethnic groups of the Philippines, List of ethnic groups in Vietnam
- West Asian peoples: Arab people, Jews, Samaritans, Druze, Peoples of the Caucasus (transcontinental), Ethnic minorities in Iran, Ethnic minorities in Iraq; Iranian peoples, Turkmen, Turks

== See also ==
- Asian diaspora
