= Tessema =

Tessema may refer to:

== People ==
=== Given name ===
- Tessema Absher (born 1986), Ethiopian long-distance runner
- Tessema Eshete, Ethiopian musician
- Tessema Nadew, Ethiopian military commander

=== Middle name ===
- Bamlak Tessema Weyesa, Ethiopian football referee

=== Surname ===
- Alem Zewde Tessema, Ethiopian military officer
- Amousse Tessema, Ethiopian cyclist
- Assefa Gebre-Mariam Tessema, Ethiopian poet and academic
- Mamo Tessema, Ethiopian artist
- Tigst Assefa Tessema (born 1996), Ethiopian long-distance runner
- Yidnekatchew Tessema, former Ethiopian president of the Confederation of African Football, footballer and manager

== Other ==
- Tessema (moth), a moth genus in the family Crambidae.
