= Eshete =

Eshete is a surname. Notable people with the surname include:

- Alemayehu Eshete (1941–2021), Ethiopian singer and musician
- Jade Eshete (born 1985), American actress
- Shitaye Eshete (born 1990), Ethiopian-born Bahraini long-distance runner
- Tessema Eshete (1876–1964), Ethiopian musician
