= Qaqasiralaq Kullualik =

Inuk artist

- Born: 1913
- Died: 1983 (aged 69–70)

Qaqasiralaq Kullualik, also known as Kakasilala Koodluarlik (1913–1983) was an Inuk artist.

Their work is included in the collections of the National Gallery of Canada, the Winnipeg Art Gallery and the Bowers Museum.
