= Evylena Nunn Miller =

American painter

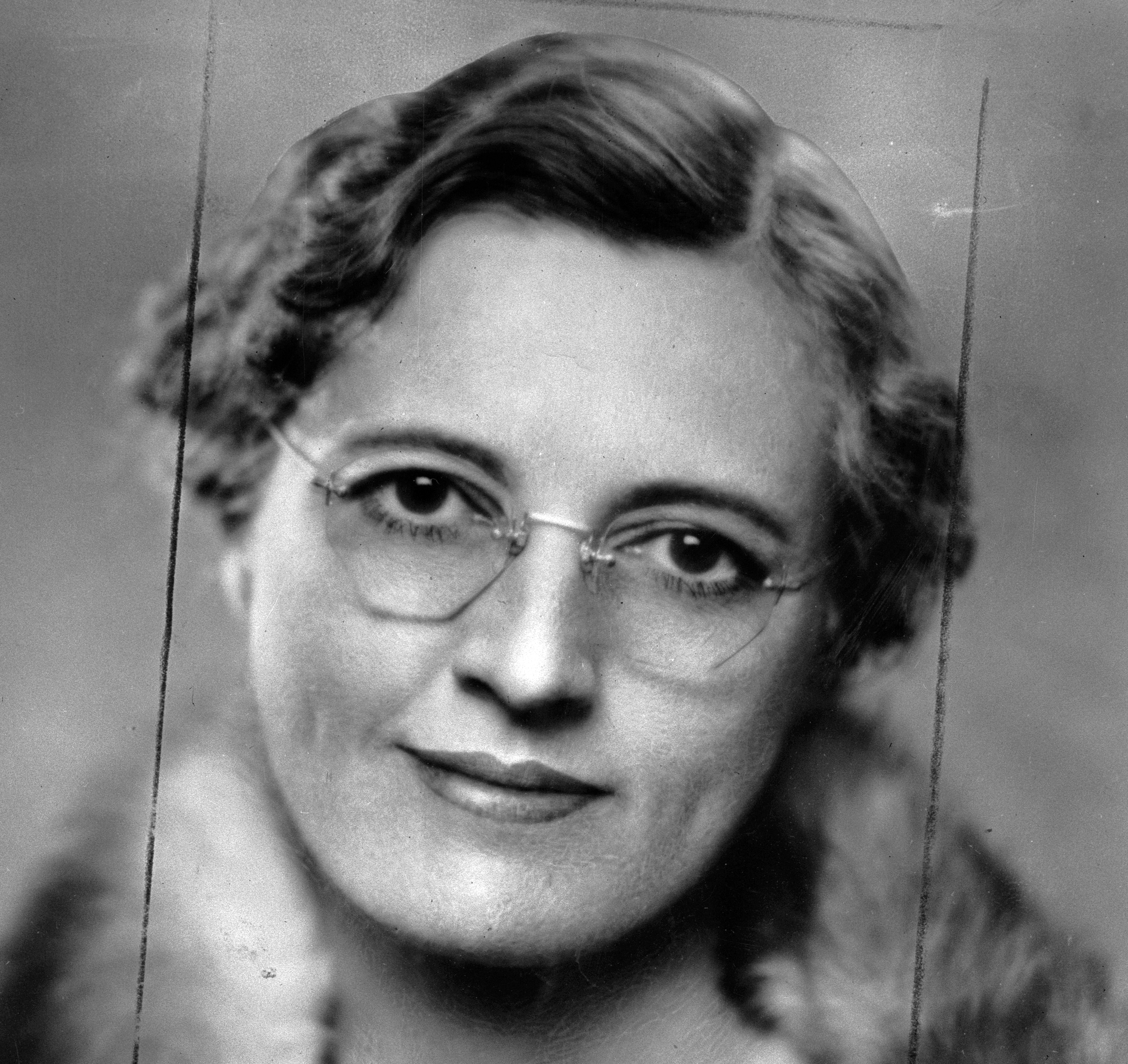
Evylena Nunn Miller

Evylena Nunn Miller (July 4, 1888 – February 25, 1966) was an American artist known for her paintings of Western landscapes and Native American pueblos. She wrote a book on the latter titled Travel Tree, and later served on the board of directors of the Bowers Museum. Her work is considered part of the California Scene Painting movement.

== Early life ==
Miller was born on July 4, 1888, in Mayfield, Kansas. She moved to California in 1903 and graduated from Santa Ana High School in 1908. She attended Occidental College before transferring to Pomona College and later earning a teaching certificate from the University of California, Los Angeles.

== Career ==
In the 1910s, Miller taught art at Claremont High School, Riverside Girls High School and Santa Ana High School. She subsequently moved to Japan where she taught at a boys' school and studied under Araki Jippo. She returned to the United States in 1923 and married Howard Earl Miller.

Her work was exhibited widely, including at the Smithsonian Institution.

She joined the board of directors of the Bowers Museum in 1956, and died ten years later.

== Bibliography ==
- Compton, Leslie (August 24, 2022). The Forgotten Artist: The Story of Evylena Nunn Miller. First Steps Publishing. ISBN 9781944072452.
- Colver, Seth I. (1962). The Historical Volume and Reference Works. Historical Publishers. pp. 641–644.
- St. Gaudens, Maurine (2015). Emerging from the shadows: A survey of women artists working in California, 1860-1960. Atglen, PA. ISBN 978-0764348860.
- Hughes, Edan Milton (2002). Artists in California, 1786-1940: L-Z. Crocker Art Museum. p. 769. ISBN 978-1-884038-08-2.
- Kovinick, Phil; Yoshiki-Kovinick, Marian (1998). An encyclopedia of women artists of the American West (1st ed.). Austin: University of Texas Press. ISBN 978-0292790636.
