= Bowers Museum =

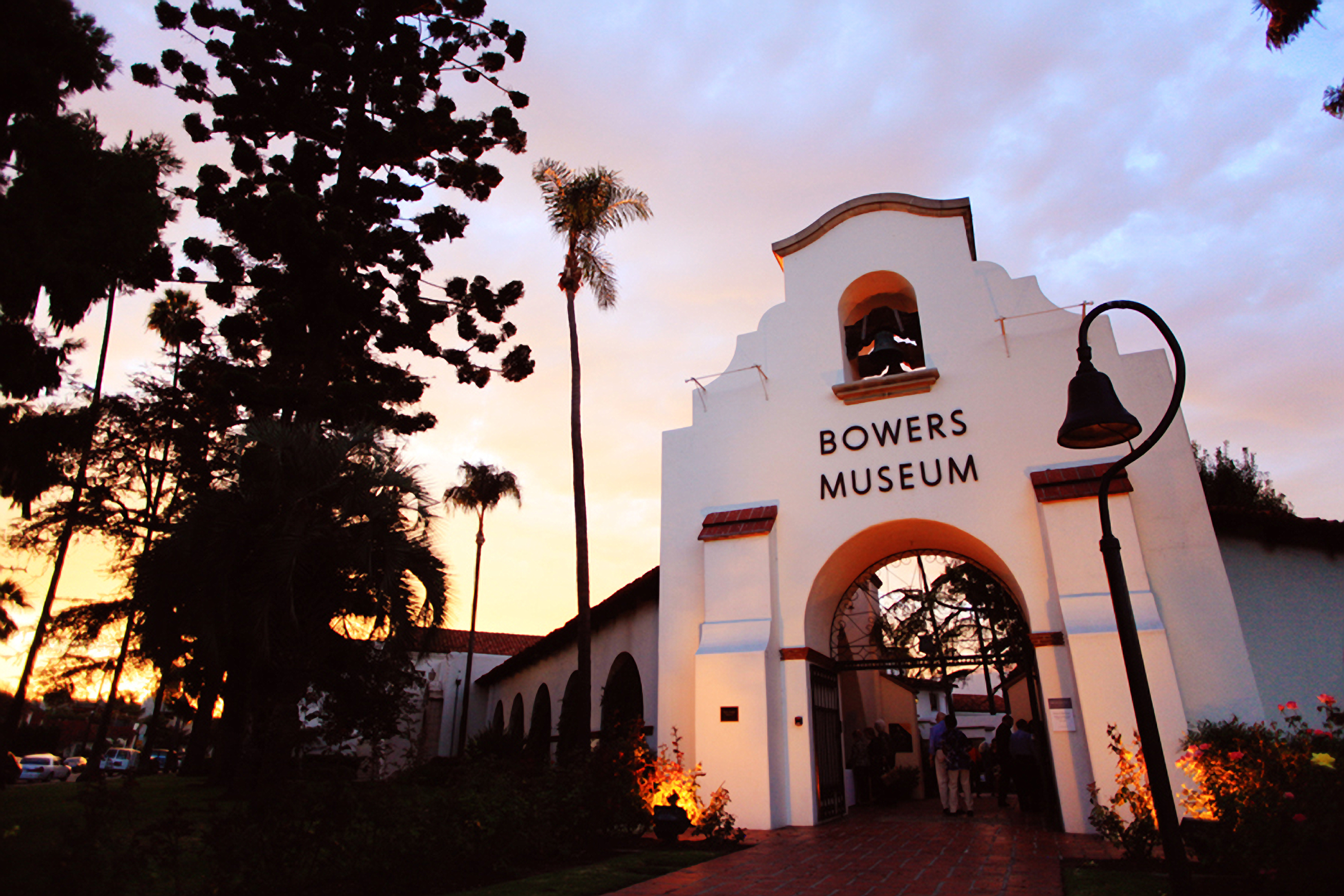
- Belltower Entrance
- Established: 1936
- Location: 2002 N. Main St, Santa Ana, California
- Coordinates: 33.76331°N 117.86820°W
- Type: Art museum, cultural art
- Director: Sean O'Harrow
- Website: www.bowers.org

The Bowers Museum is an art museum located in Santa Ana, California. The museum's permanent collection includes more than 100,000 objects, and features notable strengths in the areas of pre-Columbian Mesoamerica, Native American art, the art of Asia, Africa, and Oceania, and California plein-air painting. The Bowers organizes and hosts special exhibitions from institutions throughout the world, and travels exhibitions nationally and internationally. The museum has a second campus two blocks south of the main site, Kidseum, a children's museum with a focus on art and archaeology. The Bowers Museum and Kidseum are located in Santa Ana 6.4 km (four miles) south of Disneyland.

== History ==
Ada Elvira Bowers and her husband, Charles W. Bowers, a late 19th-century Orange County citrus grower and land developer, donated the land on which the museum stands to the city of Santa Ana as well as $100,000 to build the museum. The building was completed in 1932 but was not fully operational for almost four years due to the economic downturn of the Great Depression. The Charles W. Bowers Memorial Museum finally opened its doors in 1936 as a city-run museum in a Mission Revival-style building devoted to the history of Orange County. The museum went through its first renovation beginning in 1973 adding a 12,500 square feet wing that brought the museum to 24,000 square feet. The expansion was kicked off by earlier bequests from Evylena Nunn Miller and Nan Preble, with additional funding coming from a countywide drive, the Museum Foundation, and the city of Santa Ana.

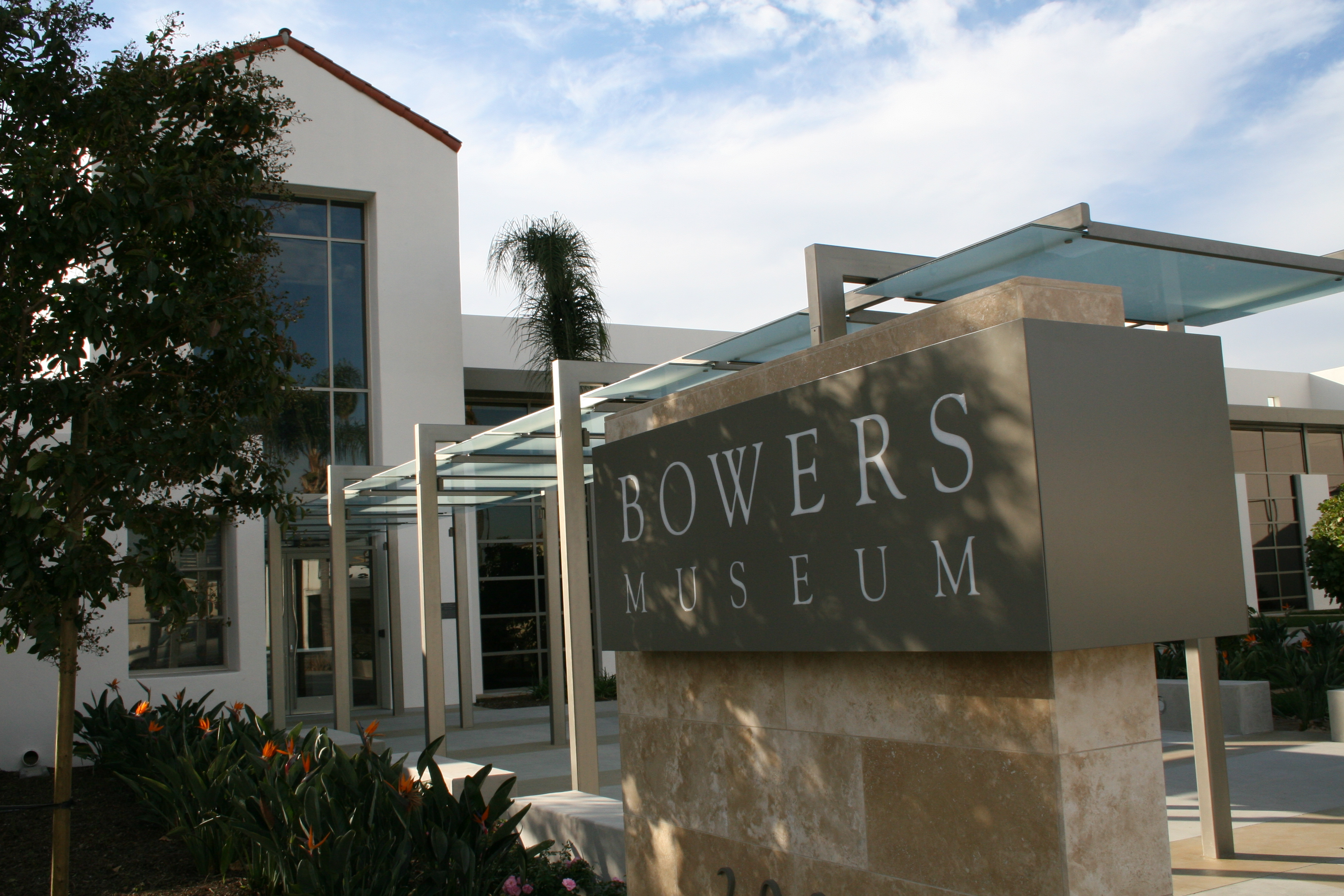
Main Street Entrance

In 1985 the Santa Ana City Council formed the Charles W. Bowers Museum Corporation to form a new governing board to run the museum and to handle fundraising. In 1986 a city study panel recommended an expansion in order to make the Bowers one of the region's top cultural centers and the anchor of a planned future arts district for Santa Ana. The museum became institutionally severed from city governance in this year, becoming its own nonprofit corporation. Many of the museum's galleries went dark in preparation for the renovation, finally closing in January 1989. The expansion plan included renovation of the original 1932 structure; a $6-million west wing addition adding over 51,000 square feet of space; and plans to demolish the 1974 addition.

In February 1990, the Bowers' board president announced a new direction for the museum's collection and programming as "the cultural arts of the Pacific Rim". In April 1991, Peter C. Keller, Ph.D., associate director of public programs for the Natural History Museum of Los Angeles County, was hired as director of the museum. The new museum building reopened on October 15, 1992, as the Bowers Museum of Cultural Art. Since then, the museum's collections, programs, and exhibitions have continued to feature Orange County history, but now reflect the demographics of larger Southern California by celebrating its diverse cultural makeup, with major emphasis on the fine arts of the indigenous peoples of the Americas, Africa, and the Pacific Rim. The Bowers Museum was recognized in the July 1993 issue of U.S. News & World Report as one of nine "must see" museums in the United States.

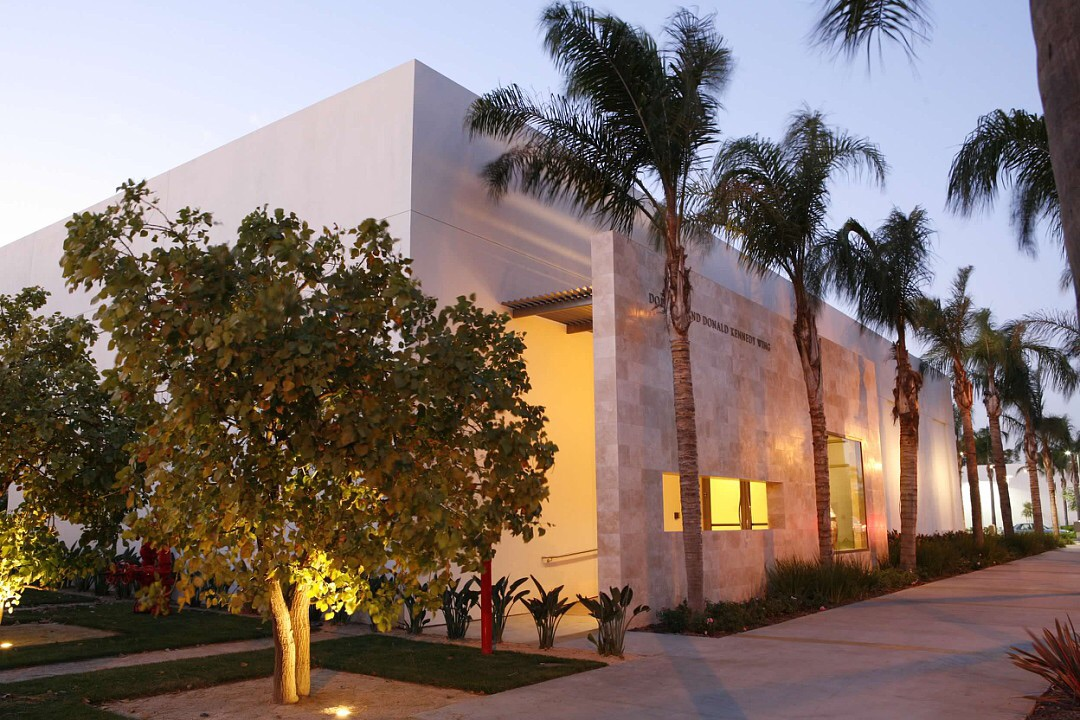
The Dorothy and Donald Kennedy Wing

In February 2007, the Bowers Museum expanded again, adding the $14.6-million Dorothy and Donald Kennedy Wing, named for Donald P. Kennedy, an executive of the First American Corporation, and his wife. The new wing included a permanent Chinese art exhibition, a permanent Oceanic exhibition (opened in 2010), additional galleries for special exhibitions, spacious event venues, and a 300-seat auditorium. The museum now presents special exhibitions from collections and institutions throughout the world, has six permanent collection galleries and, in 2016, watched its membership grow to nearly 8,000 members. The museum has increased in size from its original 10,080 square feet to more than 100,000-square-feet today, with 45,000 square feet of exhibition space. The Bowers serves more than 80,000 school children annually through docent guided tours, community outreach programs, and participatory art classes. The museum has a free family festival on the first Sunday of each month and offers free general admission to Santa Ana residents, with proof of residency, each Sunday. The Bowers Museum is accredited by the American Alliance of Museums.

== Collections ==
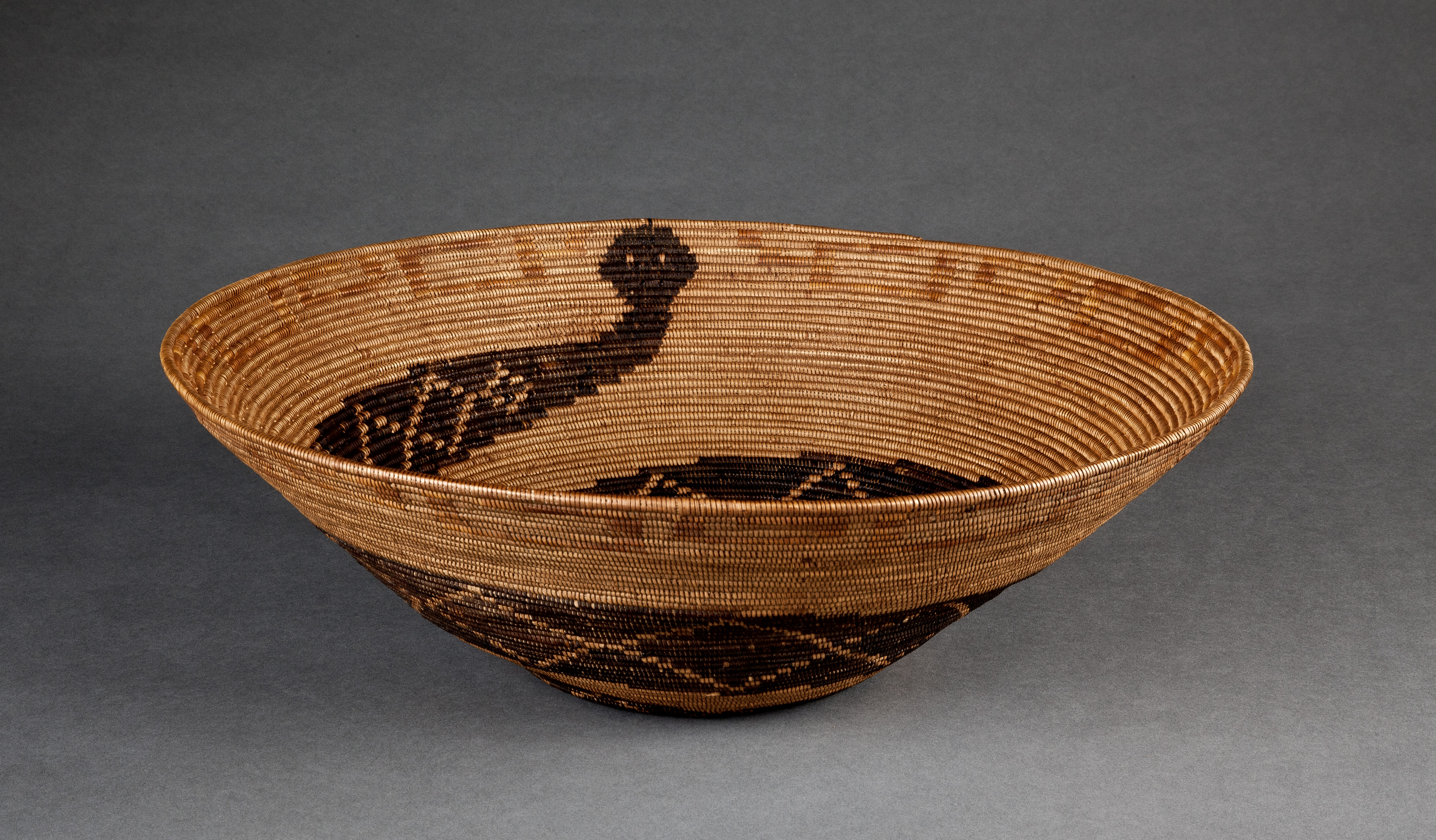
Cahuilla Basket, c. 1900

"Spirits and Headhunters: Art of the Pacific Islands" highlights masterworks from the three cultural regions of Oceania: Micronesia, Melanesia, and Polynesia. Particular focus is placed on New Guinea, and the rich artistic traditions infused into daily and ritual life. Included are larger-than-life masks, finely crafted feast bowls, objects associated with the secretive Sepik River men's house, shell and feather currency, magic figures and tools of the shaman, objects related to seagoing trade routes, personal adornments, and weapons of warfare. The Bowers' collection includes art and artifacts from many of the Pacific Islands.

"Ancient Arts of China: A 5000 Year Legacy" features nearly 75 sets of objects from the Neolithic period (c. 3000 B.C.) to the Qing dynasty (AD 1644–1911). It is drawn from the Bowers Museum's permanent holdings, plus a small number of loans from private collections, and curated by the Shanghai Museum. The works portray the evolution of Chinese technology, art, and culture, and showcase examples of bronze vessels, mirrors, polychrome potteries, sculptures, porcelains, paintings, ivory carvings, and robes. Art from China and Japan make up the majority of the Bowers' collection of Asian art and artifacts.

"California Legacies: Missions and Ranchos, 1768-1848" features objects related to three historical eras: the settlement of Alta California through Spanish land grants, life at the California Missions, and the wealth and lifestyles of the first families who flourished under Mexico's rule of the Ranchos of California.

"Ceramics of Western Mexico" focuses on Pre-Columbian art from the western Mexican states of Colima, Nayarit, and Jalisco, with a particular focus on West Mexican shaft tombs and the cultures who used this means of burying their dead. A selection of the ceramic figures placed inside shaft tombs to accompany the deceased in the afterlife is on display. The exhibition also includes objects depicting imagery from daily life that show the intensity of West Mexican figurative work and that are naturalistic in form like the famously plump Colima dogs. The Bowers' collection consists almost entirely of pottery, with some textile, stone and metal pieces. This collection is strongest in sculpture from the ancient cultures of West Mexico.

"California Bounty: Image and Identity, 1850-1930" examines California's visual history, shaped by a unique mixture of Mexican and Anglo traditions as well as the state's position on the Pacific Rim. The exhibition shows how paintings of California's land, people, fruits, and flowers reflect the state's bounty and the massive advertising campaign by real estate developers, citrus growers, the railroads, and other boosters to bring people out West. Highlights of the painting collection are a group of forty works by William and Alberta McCloskey and California plein air paintings.

"First Californians" is an extensive look at the indigenous peoples of California's art and artifacts from the collection, demonstrating the culture and history of the Southern California Coastal Indians. It explores the ways Indians of the region interacted with their environment for food, clothing, adornment, and religion. The Bowers Museum's collection is strongest in the cultures of the west and southwest but does represent native cultures from across the US. Objects in the collection include basketry, pottery, beadwork, stone and shell tools, weapons, and jewelry. These objects range in age from pre-historic to contemporary.

The Historic and Decorative Arts Collections were the first focuses of the museum. This varied collection includes historic costumes, military uniforms and textiles, furniture, dolls and toys, tools, and house wares, many of which were collected from the founding families of Orange County. The Orange County history collection contains historic newspapers, magazines and other publications, as well as photographs, art, and objects relating to the early days of Orange County. Highlights of this collection include objects relating to Madame Helena Modjeska and memorabilia and objects from the first police and fire departments of Santa Ana. The large photographic collection includes books, maps, posters, stereographs, and slides but is most notable for photographs.

== Special exhibitions ==
The Bowers Museum has partnerships with the Nanjing Museum, the Shanghai Museum, the British Museum, the Tokyo National Museum, the Vatican Ethnological Museum, the Museo del Oro of Bogotá, and the Museo de la Basílica de Guadalupe, to organize and host exhibitions since 1992.

The Bowers has organized several special exhibitions on Chinese history and culture since 2000. The museum board's chair, Anne Shih, who emigrated to the United States from her native Taiwan in 1979, has developed key contacts with Chinese cultural authorities that have given rise to several exhibitions, beginning with "Secret World of the Forbidden City: Splendor From China's Imperial Palace" (2000), an unprecedented exhibit of 350 treasures from China's Imperial Palace that included statues, pottery, paintings and other pieces, as well as recreations of rooms in the Imperial Palace.

"Treasures from Shanghai: 5000 Years of Chinese Art and Culture" (2007) featured objects on loan for the first time from the Shanghai Museum portraying the evolution of Chinese technology, art, and culture. Curated by Chen Kelun, authority on Chinese history and culture and deputy director of the Shanghai Museum, the focus of the exhibit was the ancient Chinese bronzes from late Xia to early Han dynasty, and Chinese porcelains from the Song dynasty to the prime time of the Qing dynasty. This was the third collection brought to the United States from the Shanghai Museum and the first in more than 20 years.

"Terra Cotta Warriors: Guardians of China's First Emperor" (2008) was the largest loan of terra cotta figures and significant artifacts to travel to the U.S. from the First Emperor's enormous mausoleum. Considered one of the greatest archaeological finds of the 20th century, the tomb complex featuring thousands of terra cotta warriors provided a deeper knowledge of the historical site and showcased 120 sets of objects, with 14 life-size figures. The exhibition was organized by the Bowers Museum and traveled to the High Museum of Art, the Houston Museum of Natural Science, and the National Geographic Museum, and was guest-curated by Dr. Albert E. Dien, professor emeritus, Stanford University. The Bowers partnered with the Houston Museum of Natural Science in 2011 to organize "Warriors, Tombs and Temples: China's Enduring Legacy," a sequel of newly discovered treasures from the ancient tombs.

"China's Lost Civilization: The Mystery of Sanxingdui" (2015) focused on the art and artifacts of Sanxingdui, a small village that is one of China's ancient mysteries. This international exhibition featured 120 bronze, jade, and gold objects from the village of Sanxingdui, and its highly sophisticated culture unlike any other in China. The exhibition examined the mystery of where the 3500-year-old culture came from and where and why it abruptly vanished. Organized by the Sichuan Cultural Bureau and, the Bowers Museum, the exhibition traveled to the Houston Museum of Natural Science.

The Bowers also partnered with the British Museum after signing a five-year agreement, yielding several exhibitions. "Egyptian Treasures from the British Museum" (2001) presented more than 100 items illustrating the achievements of ancient Egyptian art and culture, many of which had been loaned for the first time. John Taylor, Assistant Keeper of The British Museum, was curator of the exhibition. "Mummies: Death and the Afterlife in Ancient Egypt: Treasures From the British Museum" (2005) featured a comprehensive collection of ancient Egyptian funerary material. The exhibition featured 140 objects, including 14 mummies and/or coffins, and was at the time the largest exhibition of its kind to be shown by the British Museum outside of Britain. "Queen of Sheba: Legend and Reality" (2004) explored the legend of the Queen of Sheba as portrayed in cultures around the world. This exhibition of antiquities, coins, prints, drawings, and modern ephemera delved into the reality of the Queen of Sheba by including archaeological evidence from the ancient kingdom of Saba in modern-day Yemen. The exhibition was organized by The British Museum.

For the exhibition "The Holy Land: David Roberts, Dead Sea Scrolls, House of David Inscription" (2002) the museum implemented metal detectors, armed guards, and increased police presence to protect two of Israel's most important links to its ancient history: the House of David Inscription and two fragments of the Dead Sea Scrolls. This was the first time the House of David Inscription—a stone fragment containing the first mention of King David outside the Hebrew Scriptures—was viewed outside Israel. Because of the historic significance of the scrolls and inscription, this was the only venue for the exhibition, which returned to Israel immediately after it closed.

"Tibet: Treasures from the Roof of the World" (2004) offered a rare glimpse into the sacred culture of Tibet, bringing nearly 200 sacred objects to the Western world for the first time. Midway through its run, about 70 protesters gathered outside the Bowers to complain that the show failed to address the fraught history of Chinese domination of Tibet since the 1950s, including its crushing of a 1959 uprising and ban of the Dalai Lama, Tibetan Buddhism's spiritual leader. The Bowers at the time said that the exhibition's aim was to explore Tibet's art history, not contemporary politics.

"The Baroque World of Fernando Botero" (2009) included more than 100 works of art dating from the 1950s to the present and compiled from the artist's personal collection—many of which had never been seen in public. The Colombian artist, Fernando Botero's unique style is recognized and renowned worldwide for its voluminous forms and sensuous figures. Equally comical, as they are critical, these works take on themes of religion, politics, history, and contemporary life in Latin America through portraiture, still life, and sculpture. Organized and circulated by Art Services International, Alexandria, Virginia.

"Lucy's Legacy: The Hidden Treasure of Ethiopia" (2013) focused on current scientific theory on human evolution and how the discovery of Lucy (Australopithecus) continues to influence our understanding of human origins. Discovered in the late 20th century in Ethiopia, Lucy is the oldest and most complete adult fossil of a human ancestor that has been found in Africa to date. After being exhibited at the Bowers Museum, the rare and fragile hominid fossil was returned to the National Museum of Ethiopia in Addis Ababa, Ethiopia. The tour of Lucy was controversial and subsequently casts have been circulated instead. The international exhibition was organized by the Houston Museum of Natural Science in collaboration with The Ministry of Culture and Tourism of the Federal Democratic Republic of Ethiopia and the Ethiopian Exhibition Coordinating Committee.

"First Americans: Tribal Art from North America" (2014) was the first large-scale exhibition featuring the traditional cultures of North America to be shown in China. Organized by the Bowers and drawn from the permanent collection, the exhibition included pottery, wicker objects, beaded items, textiles, and sculpture. The exhibition traveled to the Guangdong, Shanxi, and Hunan Provincial museums in China, as well as the Museum del Oro de Bogota, where it was titled "Tribal Art from North America/Tradiciones y Trasiciones: Indígenas de Norteamérica."

"The Virgin of Guadalupe: Images in Colonial Mexico" (2016) presented sixty works of art, including paintings, sculpture, engravings, silver, textiles, and other devotional objects from both privately and publicly held Mexican collections. This was the first exhibition presented at a museum in the United States that focused on the depiction of the Virgin of Guadalupe in Colonial art. It took a holistic view of the religious and social aspects related to the Virgin, showing how she has become a unifying symbol for the people of Mexico and the Americas. This exhibition marked the second occasion the Bowers Museum organized an exhibition on the Virgin of Guadalupe. The first exhibition, "Visions of Guadalupe: Selections from the Museum of the Basilica de Guadalupe" (1995), included 79 paintings, votives, engravings and vestments collected over centuries by the Basilica of Our Lady of Guadalupe in Mexico City, Mexico.

== Kidseum ==
Founded in 1994, Bowers' Kidseum, both an interactive children's museum and learning center, serves as an 11,000 square-foot extension of the main museum. In 2014, Kidseum celebrated its 20th anniversary with a re-opening of the newly renovated high-tech and interactive space. The name "Kidseum" was created by a child in the community in a naming contest.

== Controversy ==
In 2008, the museum was involved in a high-profile controversy when federal agents raided four Southern California museums. Acting on evidence gathered during a five-year undercover probe, investigators seized artifacts which had allegedly been illegally excavated from sites across Southeast Asia and the Americas, smuggled into Los Angeles and donated to the museums.

In 2014, the museum issued a statement saying that it had stopped collecting archaeological items years ago, and was instead focusing on bringing archaeological items from foreign museums to the United States for exhibition. The museum also said that it supported the U.S. government's efforts to protect such historic sites, and was willing to work with foreign governments in the repatriation of antiquities. The museum agreed to return 542 ancient bowls and other artifacts to Thailand in exchange for the government prosecutors agreeing to drop criminal charges against the museum's staff. Repatriation of the Thai antiquities occurred in November 2014.

== Management ==
The Bowers Museum is a nonprofit, tax-exempt 501(c)(3) organization. The museums' exhibitions, programming, and operations are member supported and funded through contributions from individuals, corporations, and foundations. Significant funding is also provided by an annual grant from the city of Santa Ana. A board of governors consisting of 32 members governs the museum. The current chairman of the board is Anne Shih. Dr. Sean O'Harrow was instated (August 2023) as president and CEO following the passing of Peter C. Keller, Ph.D. (November 2022), who had been president of the Bowers since 1991.

== Selected collection highlights ==
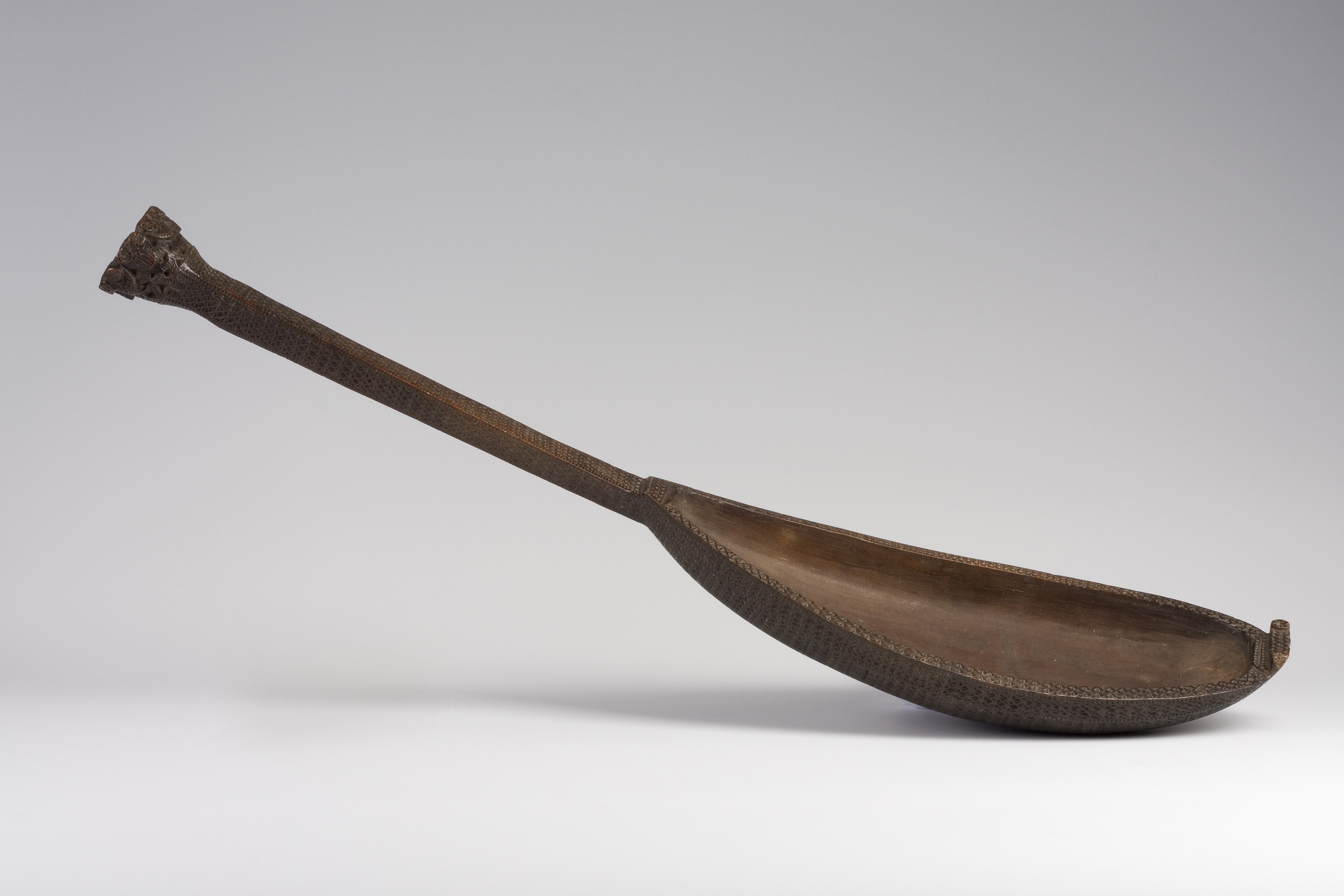
Ceremonial Ladle, 19th Century, Austral Islands, French Polynesia, Polynesia

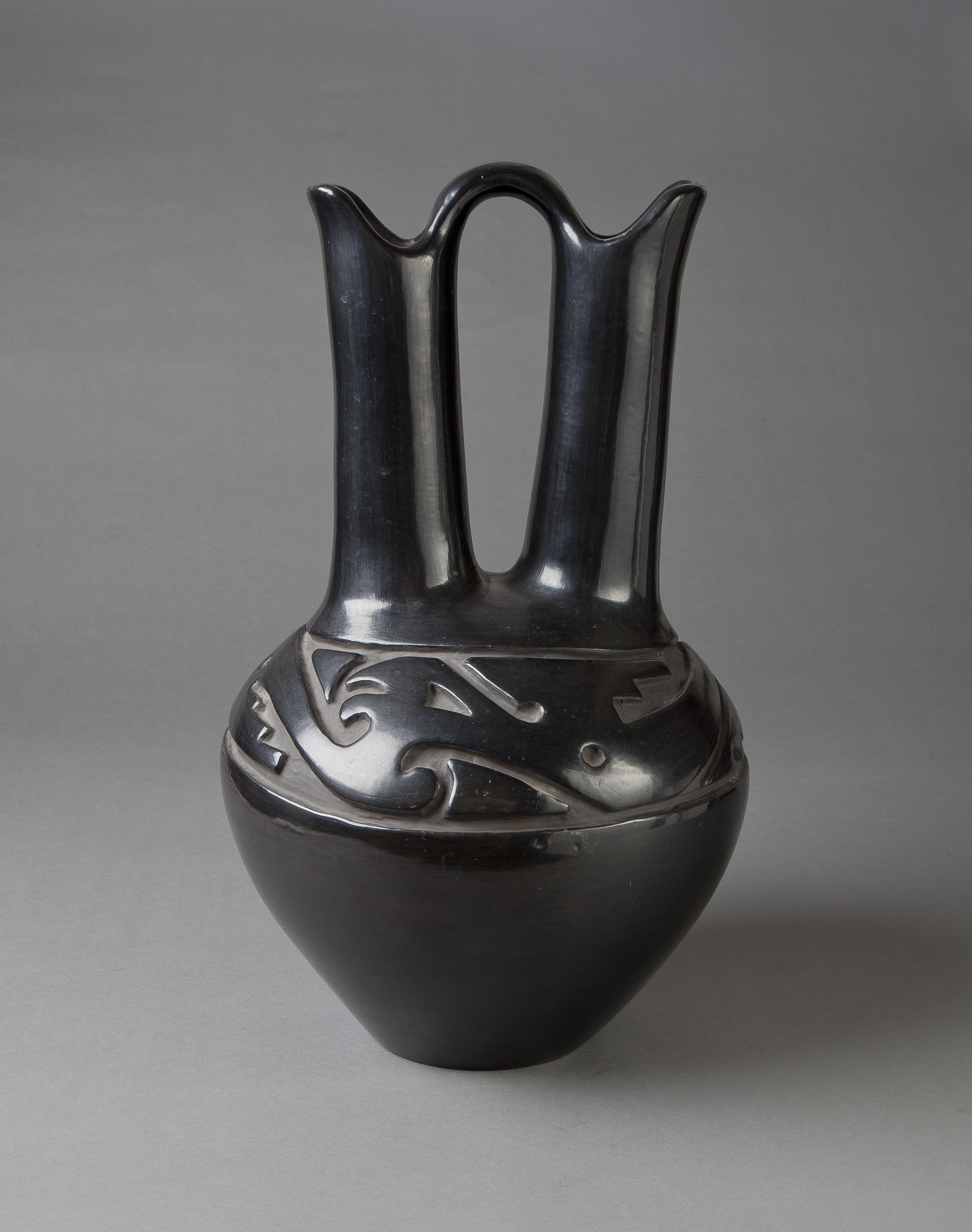
Wedding Vase, c. 1970, Margaret Tafoya (1904-2001), Santa Clara Pueblo, New Mexico

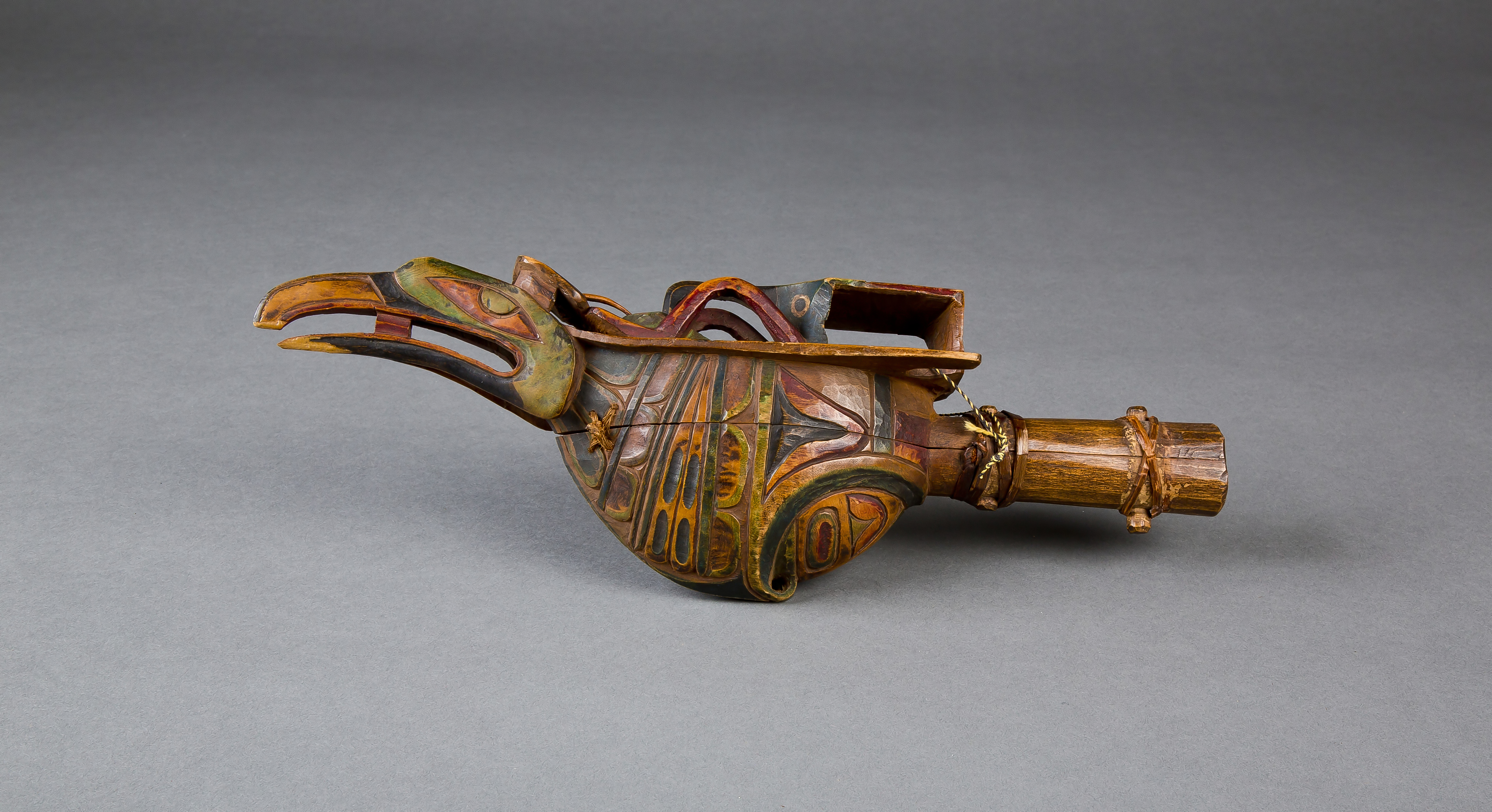
Raven Rattle, late 19th Century Tlingit culture; Fort Wrangell, Alaska

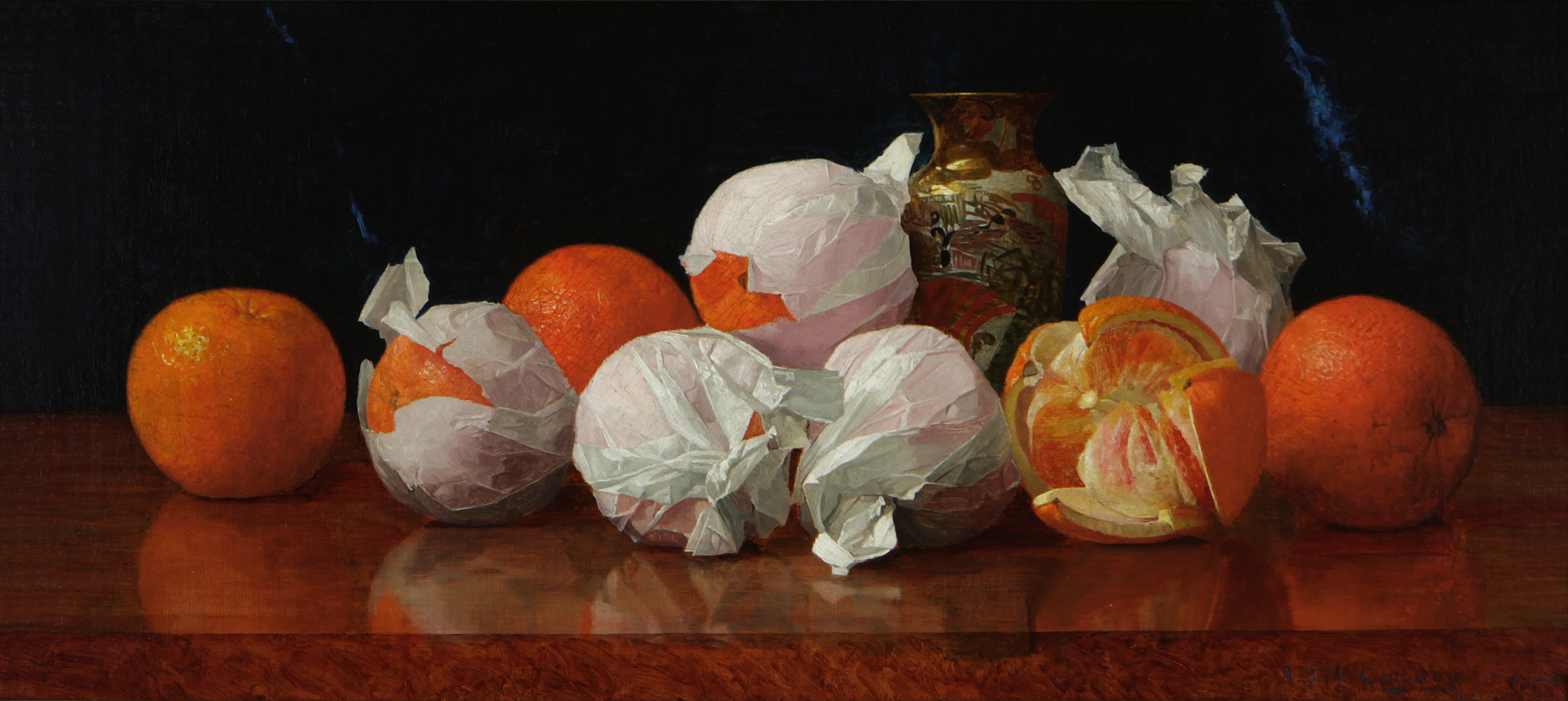
Untitled (Oranges in Tissue with Vase), 1889 by Alberta Binford McCloskey (American, 1855–1911)

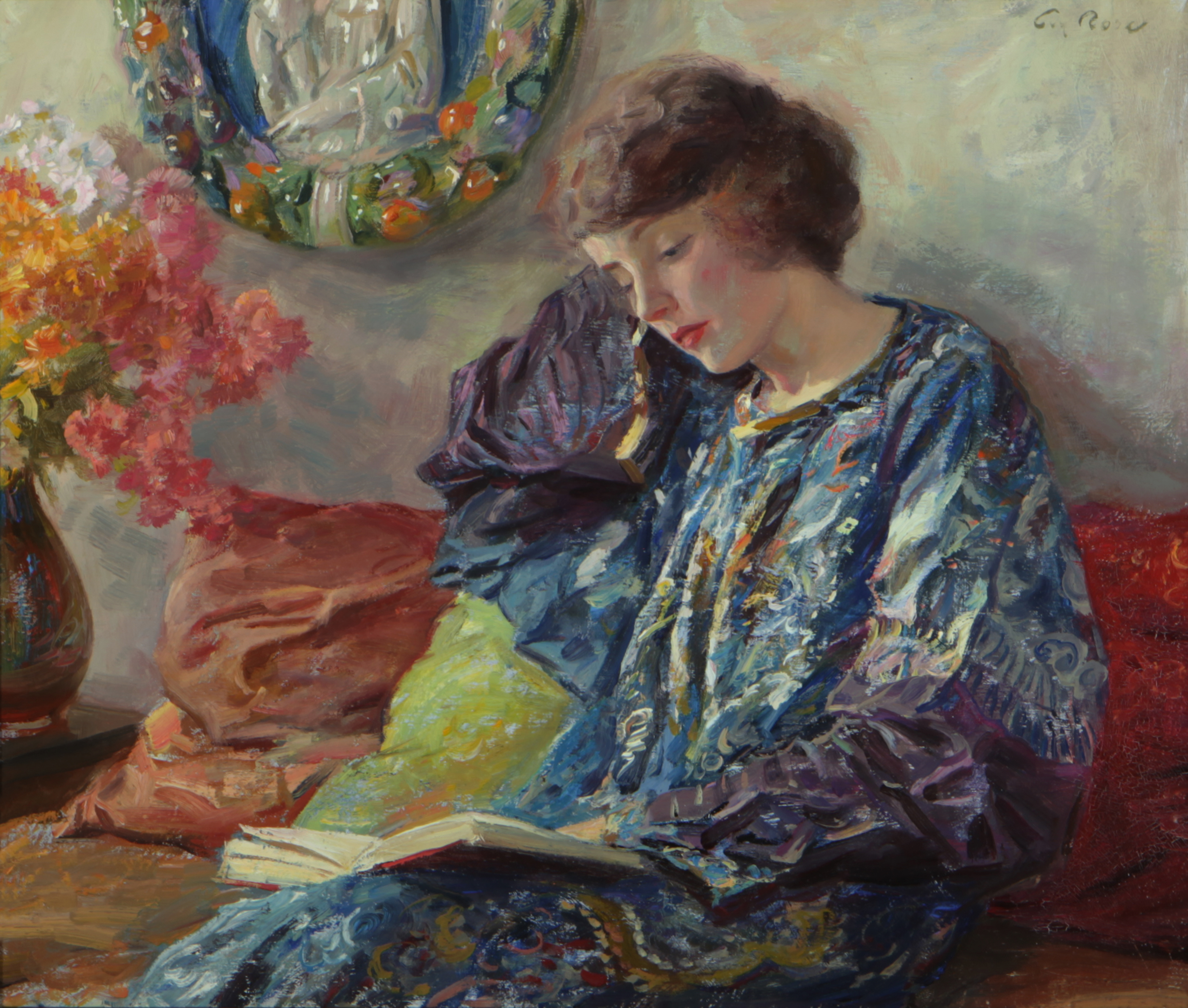
Marguerite, 1909 by Guy Rose (American, 1867–1925)

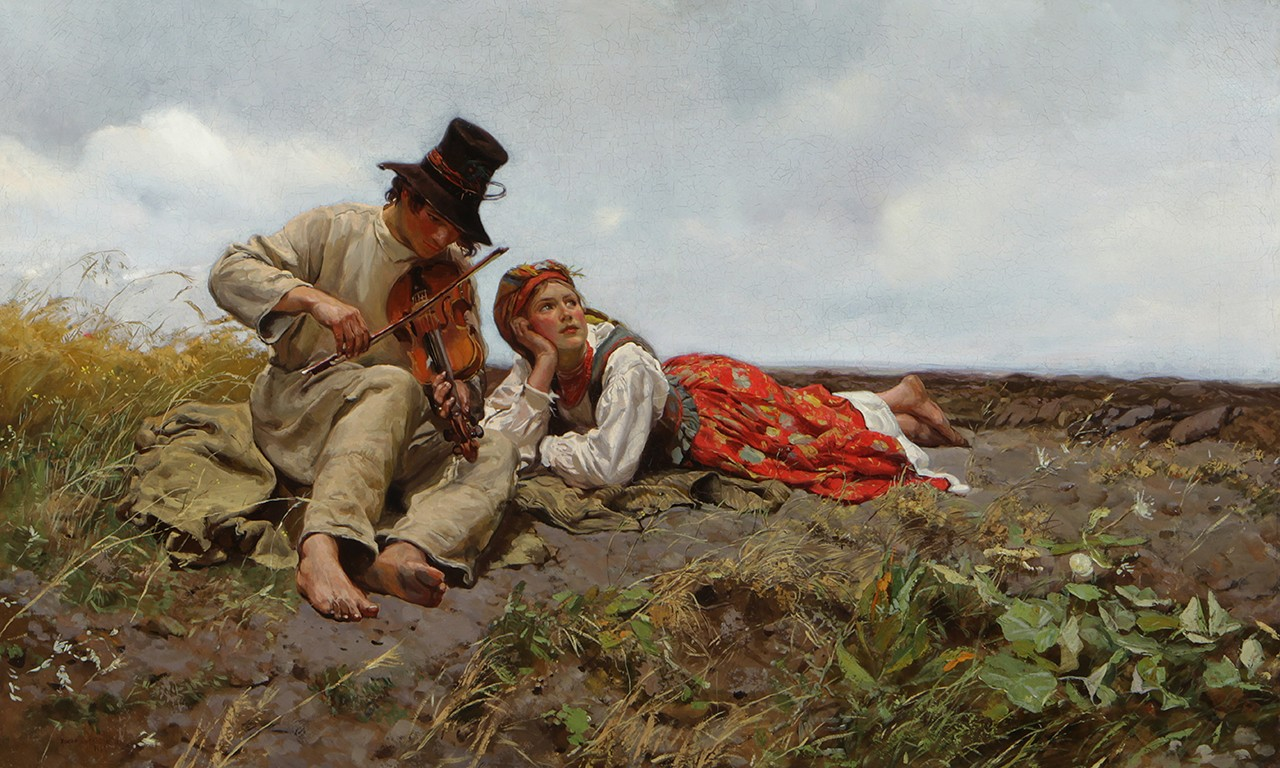
Idyll, 1885 by Józef Chełmoński (Polish, 1849-1914)
