= Santa Ana High School =

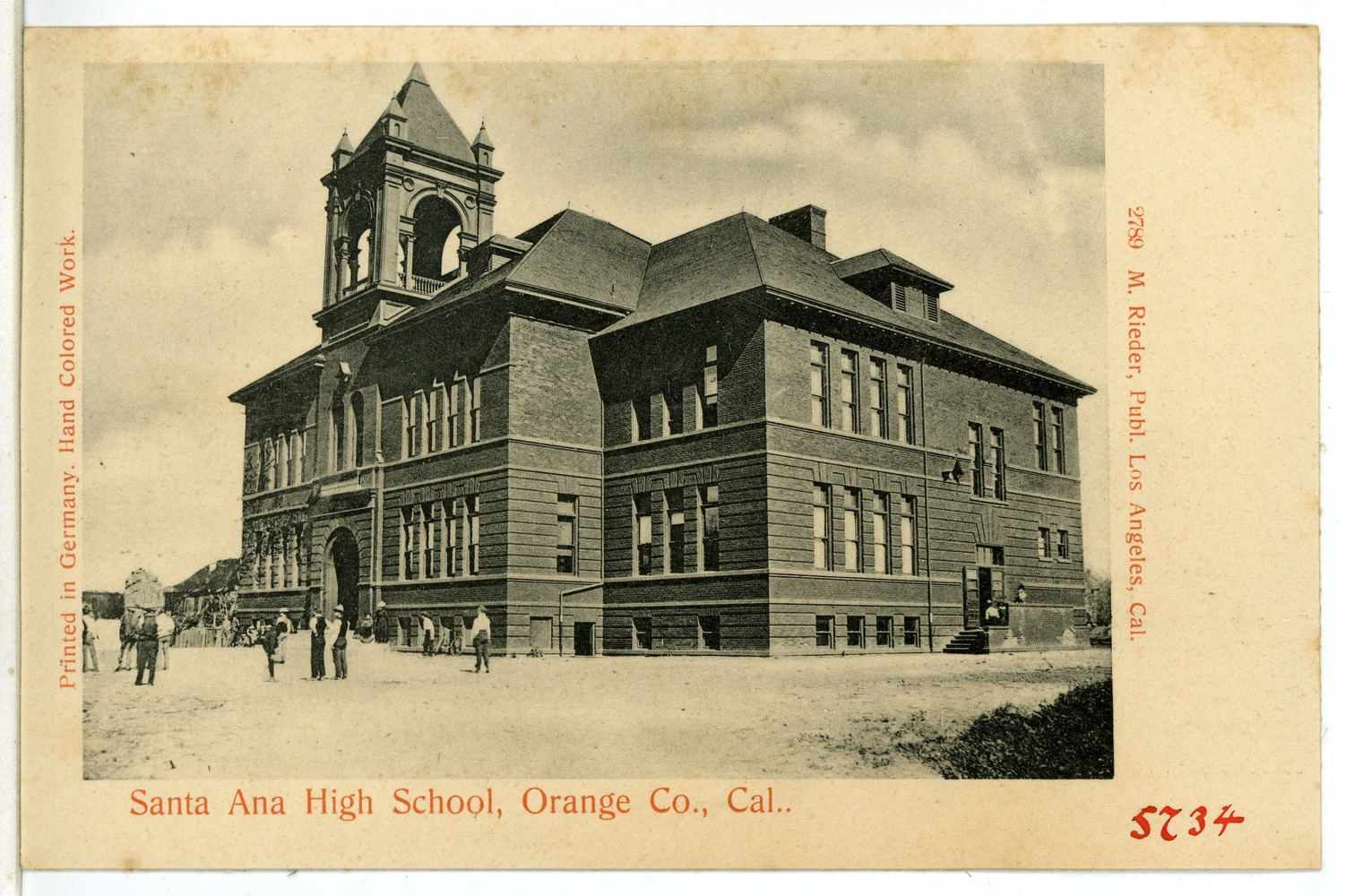

Location
- 520 W. Walnut St. Santa Ana, California; United States; 33°44′38″N 117°52′24″W

Information
- Type: Public
- Motto: Once a Saint, Always A Saint!
- Established: 1889
- School district: Santa Ana Unified School District
- Principal: Gabriel Moreno
- Teaching staff: 135.18 (on an FTE basis)
- Grades: 9–12
- Enrollment: 3,135 (2022–23)
- Student to teacher ratio: 23.19
- Colors: Red, white, and Columbia blue
- Mascot: Sammy & Sally Saint
- Website: santaanahigh.sausd.us

Santa Ana High School is the oldest and largest high school in Orange County, California, United States. The school was established in 1889.

== Notable alumni ==
- Daniel Antúnez, soccer player
- Barry Asher, professional bowler
- Tony Baxter former senior vice president of Walt Disney Imagineering and lead designer of Big Thunder Mountain Railroad, Star Tours, the Indiana Jones Adventure, Splash Mountain, and Journey into Imagination
- Billy Bean (1964–2024), played major league baseball from 1987 through 1995; tied a major league record with four hits in his first major league game
- Tony Bellamy, guitarist, member of first Native American rock band Redbone, had number-one hit in the 1970s "Come and Get Your Love"
- Beverly Bivens, singer with the 1960s band We Five
- Eddie Bravo, Brazilian Jiu-Jitsu athlete
- John Brinkerhoff, USMA '50, associate director for National Preparedness FEMA, Deputy Assistant Secretary for Reserve Affairs DoD
- Gerald P. Carr, astronaut
- The Chantays, surf band, its original members: Bob Spickard, Brian Carman (co-writers of "Pipeline"), Bob Welch, Warren Waters and Rob Marshall
- Placida Gardner Chesley, bacteriologist
- Clifford "Gavvy" Cravath, six-time National League baseball home-run champion in the 1910s
- Jeff Cravath, college football coach
- Josephine Cruickshank, tennis player
- Isaac Curtis, football player, Cal Berkeley and NFL Cincinnati Bengals
- Don Davis, NFL player
- Clancy Edwards, sprinter
- Derek Fleming, featured Soul Train dancer 1980–1993
- Delfín Jaranilla, Filipino magistrate
- James Kanno, first mayor of Fountain Valley, California
- Diane Keaton, actress
- Dana and Ginger Lamb, travel writers
- Greg Louganis, Olympic gold medal diver, LGBT activist, called "the greatest American diver in Olympic history"
- Larry Lutz, NFL player
- Patrick McMorris, NFL safety for the Miami Dolphins
- Bill Medley, singer and songwriter, best known as one half of The Righteous Brothers singing duo
- Gilbert Melendez, two-time California State All-American wrestler; professional mixed martial artist; former WEC and Strikeforce Lightweight Champion, current UFC lightweight contender
- Evylena Nunn Miller, painter
- Donn Moomaw, football player, minister
- Jim Musick, NFL player, Orange County Sheriff from 1947 to 1975
- Ken Paff, co-founder and National Organizer of Teamsters for a Democratic Union
- Hal Pangle (1912–1968), NFL running back
- Frostee Rucker, NFL player
- Robert A. Schuller, televangelist
- Chuck Smith (class of 1945), founder and pastor of Calvary Chapel of Costa Mesa
- Milt Smith (1919–2010), football player, UCLA Bruins and Philadelphia Eagles
- William Cameron Townsend, 20th-century American Christian missionary; founder of Wycliffe Bible Translators and Summer Institute of Linguistics (SIL International)
- Jose Vasquez, soccer player
- Marvalee Hendricks Wake, evolutionary biologist
- John Ward, football player
- Deana L. Weibel, anthropologist and author
