= Agegnehu Engida =

Ethiopian modern painter (1905–1950)

Agegnehu Engida (Amharic: አገኘሁ እንግዳ, 1905 – 1950), was an Ethiopian modern painter. He blended abstraction, expressionism, and surrealism, but maintained a style that was "distinctively Ethiopian."

== Biography ==
As part of Emperor Haile Selassie's education program, Agegnehu was granted a government scholarship to study at the École nationale supérieure des Beaux-Arts in Paris, France from 1926 to 1933. After his return from Europe, Agegnehu held many art exhibitions. He also worked on commissions for military uniforms, birr currency designs, church murals and portraits.

In 1941, Agegnehu became the assistant director of Ethiopia's new Department of Fine Arts in the Ministry of Education and Fine Arts.

He died of unknown causes in 1950, shortly after finishing the painting Twelve Donkeys.

Few works by the artist are known to survive today. Two of his portraits are housed in the National Museum of Ethiopia: a self-portrait and a portrait of Aster Mengesha.
