= John Ward (American football, born 1907) =

American football player (1907–1968)

No. 14
- Position: Tackle

Personal information
- Born: March 8, 1907; Santa Ana, California, U.S.
- Died: December 29, 1968 (aged 61); Orange, California, U.S.
- Listed height: 6 ft 2 in (1.88 m)
- Listed weight: 215 lb (98 kg)

Career information
- High school: Garden Grove (Garden Grove, California)
- College: USC

Career history

Playing
- Frankford Yellow Jackets (1930); Minneapolis Red Jackets (1930)

Coaching
- Football: Garden Grove HS (CA) (1931–1937) Head coach; Santa Ana (1938–1941) Line coach; Santa Ana HS (CA) (1945) Line coach; Santa Ana (1946–1952) Line coach; Santa Ana (1953–1954) Head coach; Track: Santa Ana (1938–?) Head coach

Operations
- Santa Ana (1955–1965) Athletic director

Career statistics
- Games played: 13
- Games started: 13
- Stats at Pro Football Reference

John M. Ward (March 8, 1907 – December 29, 1968), sometimes called Johnny Ward, was an American football player and coach. He played college football at the University of Southern California (USC) and was "rated one of the strongest linemen in Troy's history." He turned pro in 1930, playing in the National Football League (NFL) as a tackle for the Frankford Yellow Jackets and Minneapolis Red Jackets. He appeared in 13 NFL games, all as a starter. Ward served as the head football coach at Santa Ana College in Santa Ana, California from 1953 to 1954.

Ward began his coaching career in 1931, at his alma mater, Garden Grove High School in Garden Grove, California. He went to Santa Ana College in 1938 as line coach for the football team and head track coach. During World War II, Ward served as a lieutenant in the United States Navy and was stationed as Adak and Attu in the Aleutian Islands. He returned to California in 1945 as line coach at Santa Ana High School and resumed his role as line coach at Santa Ana College the following year. He was the school's athletic director from 1955 until his retirement in 1965. Ward died on December 29, 1968, at St. Joseph Hospital in Orange, California, after suffering a heart attack.

== Head coaching record ==
=== Junior college football ===
Year	Team	Overall	Conference	Standing	Bowl/playoffs
Santa Ana Dons (Eastern Conference) (1953–1954)
1953	Santa Ana	3–6–1	2–4	T–5th	
1954	Santa Ana	3–7	1–5	6th	
Santa Ana:		6–13–1	3–9		
Total:		6–13–1			
