= Kidist Hailu Degaffe =

Ethiopian artist (born 1969)

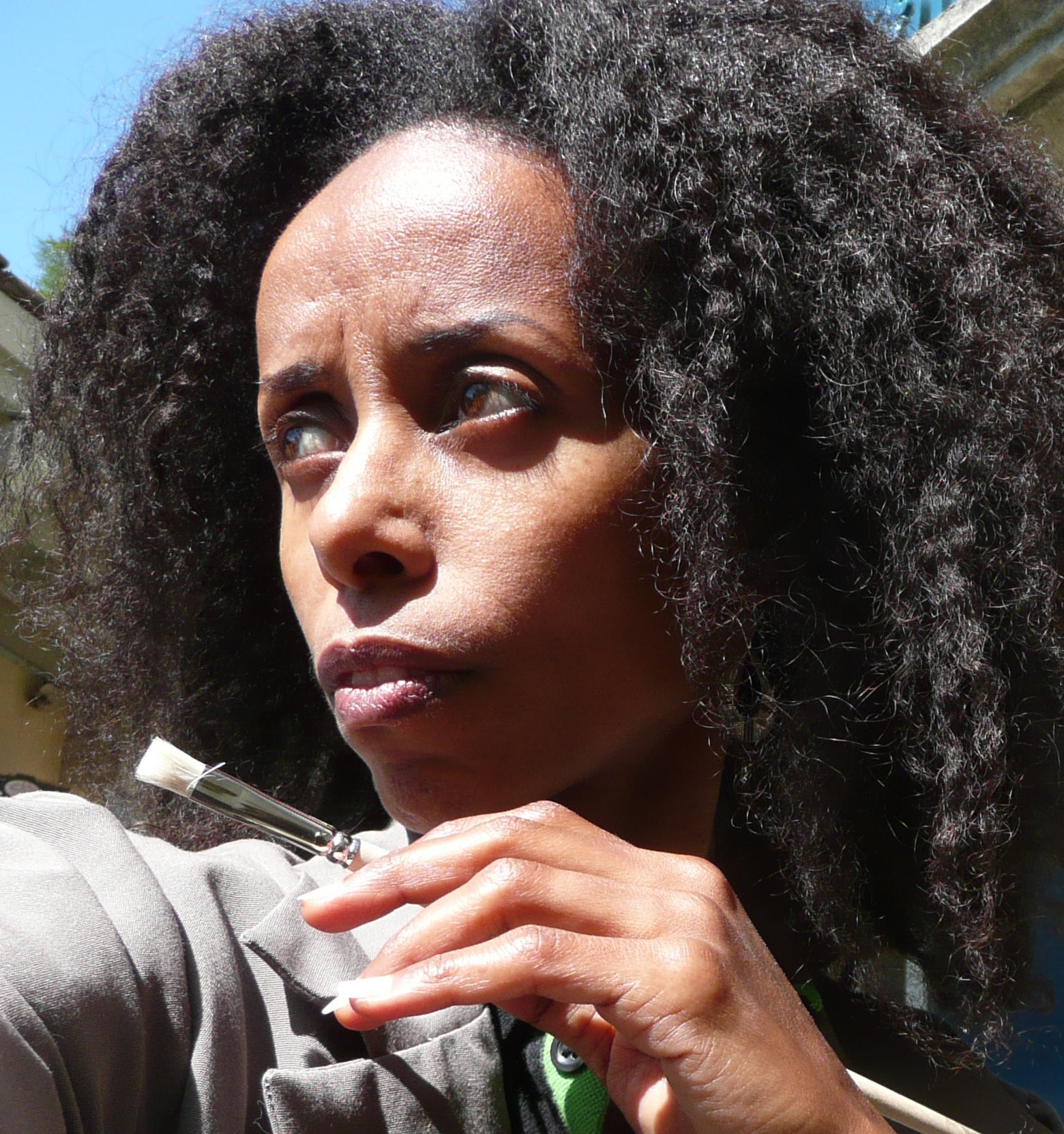
- Degaffe in 2010
- Born: 1969 (age 56–57); Ethiopia
- Education: Addis Ababa University
- Website: degaffesart.com

Kidist Hailu Degaffe (born 1969) is an Ethiopian contemporary artist and women's rights activist.

== Biography ==
Degaffe was born in 1969 in Ethiopia. She was educated at Addis Ababa University, graduating with a degree in English and Literature. After working in the airline industry, journalism and marketing, Degaffe became a professional painted in 2004. She moved to Switzerland in 2009.

Degaffe has exhibited internationally, with a solo show at Galerie Basta in Lausanne, Switzerland. She has also had works shown in group exhibitions, including at the Galerie Kleiner Prinz in Baden-Baden, Germany, and the Skoto Gallery in New York, United States. Her works are held in the collections of the National Museum of Ethiopia in Addis Ababa, Ethiopia and the Gallery Brulhart in Geneva, Switzerland.

She raises awareness through her painting about issues including poverty, famine, girls' early marriages and obstetric fistulas on the African continent. Her painting style is to use quick brush movements.

== Artwork in public collections ==
The National Museum of Ethiopia and the Museum of Ethnography of Geneva have each an artwork from Kidist Hailu Degaffe.

== Awards ==
- Médaille d’Honneur, Talents des Arts d’Aujourd’hui 2011, France
- Special Prize, International Postage Stamp Design Contest, 2008, Republic of Korea
- Certificate of recognition, the National Museum of Ethiopia, 2006
- Certificate of Appreciation, USAID, I.O.M., 2005
- Letter of recommendation, Embassy of Japan, 2008, Addis Ababa
- Letter of recommendation, Embassy of the State of Palestine, 2006
- Certificate of recognition, Ministry of Transport and Communication, 2007, Ethiopia

== Gallery ==
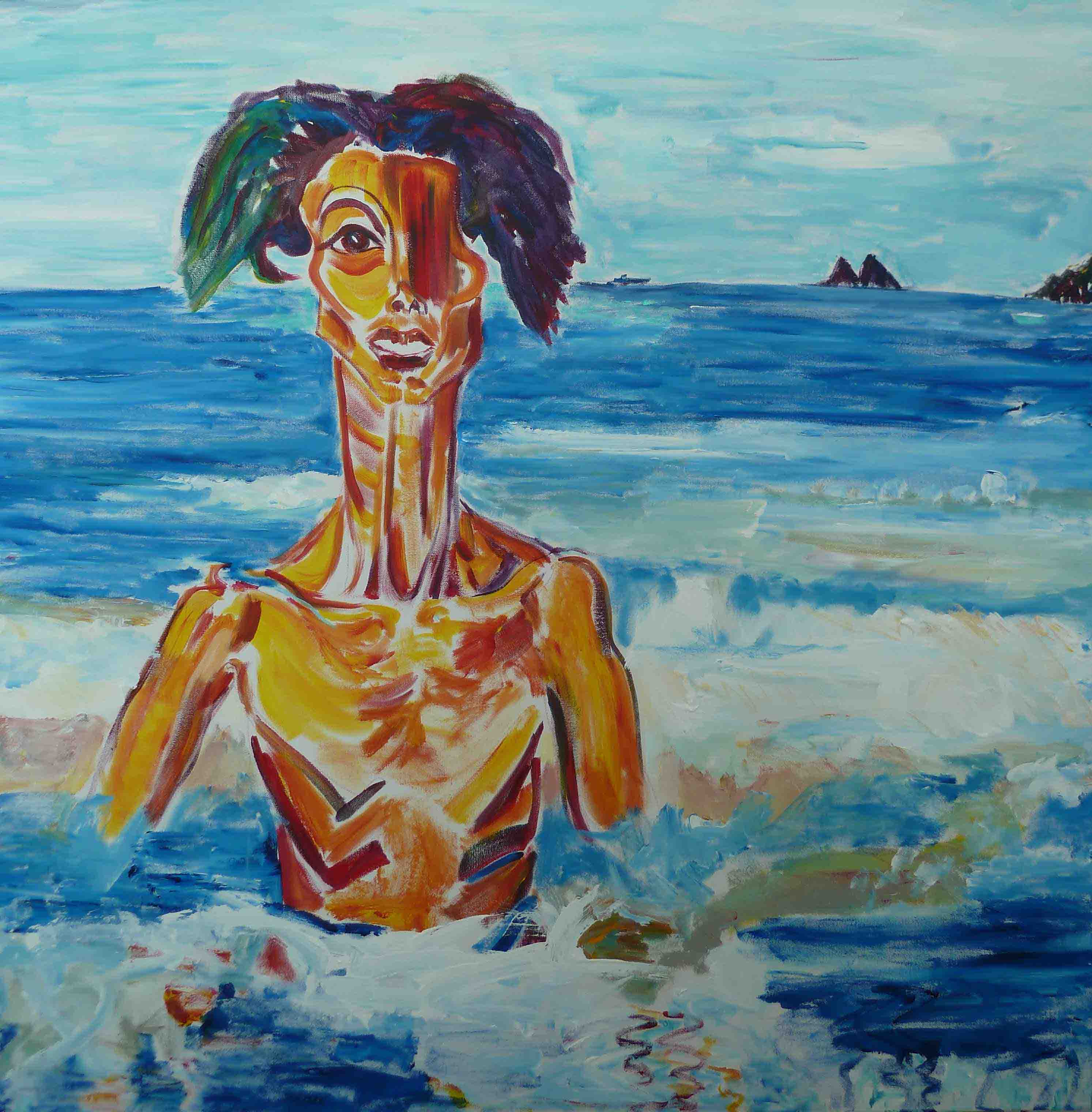
Painting from the series iMigration (2015)

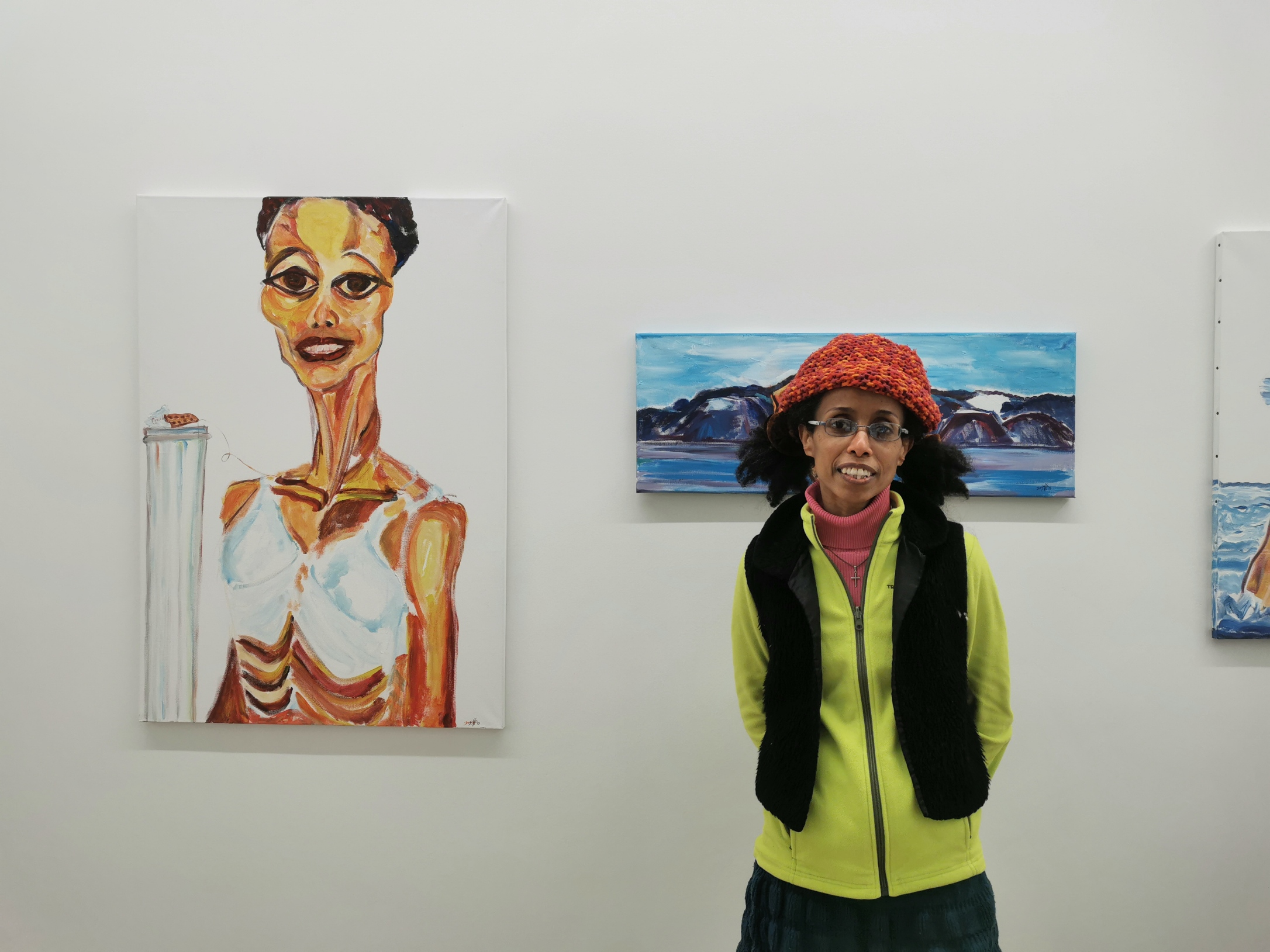
Degaffe at Gallery Bruhlart in 2021
