= National Museum of Ethiopia =

National museum in Addis Ababa, Ethiopia

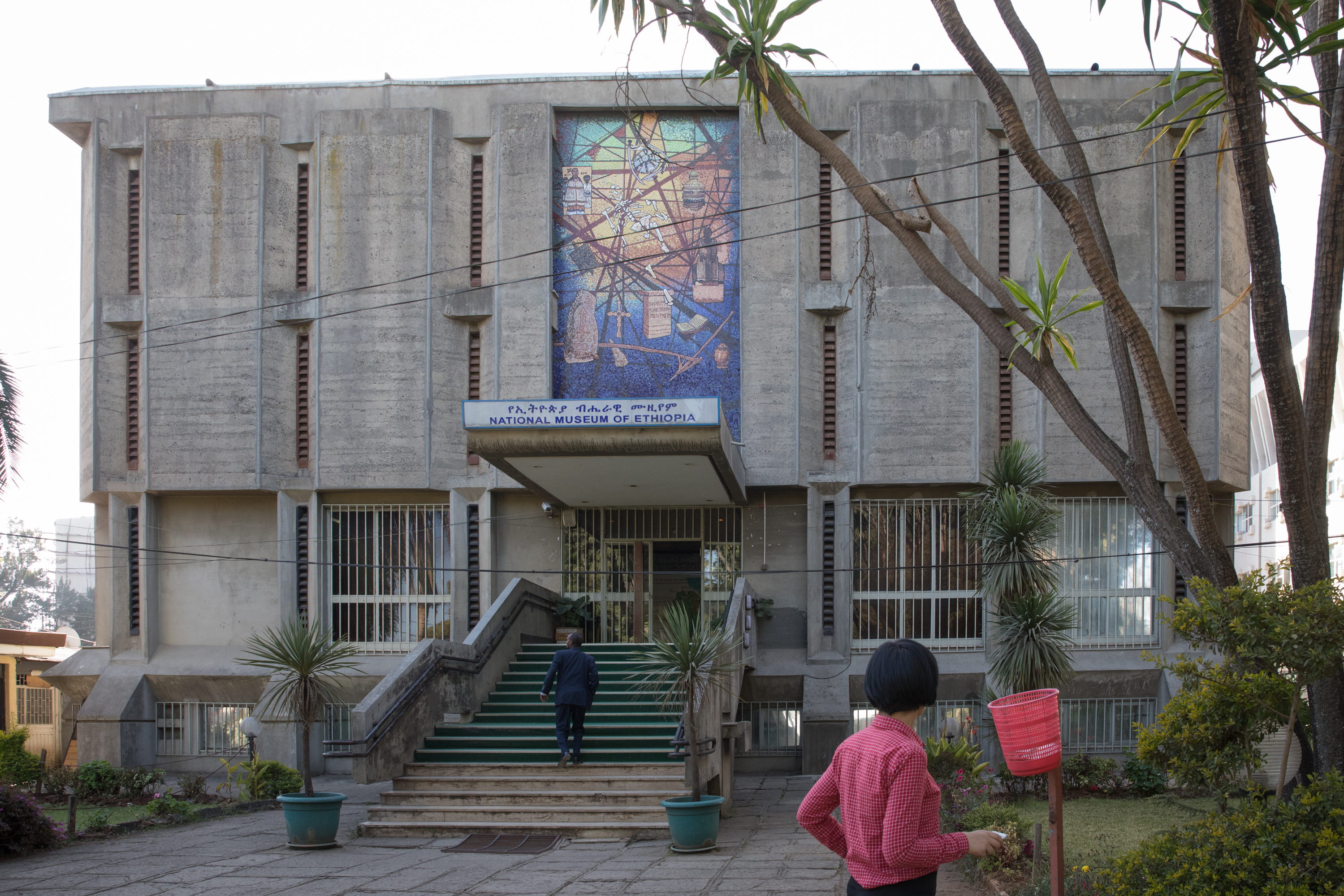
- Established: 1958
- Location: Addis Ababa, Ethiopia
- Coordinates: 9.0385°N 38.7615°E
- Type: National museum
- Collection size: Hominid fossils, D'mt items, Kingdom of Aksum objects, Ethiopian Empire art

The National Museum of Ethiopia (NME), also referred to as the Ethiopian National Museum, is a national museum in Ethiopia. It is located in the capital, Addis Ababa, near the Addis Ababa University's graduate school.

== Overview ==
The museum houses Ethiopia's artistic treasures. It contains many precious local archaeological finds such as the fossilized remains of early hominids, the most famous of which is "Lucy," the partial skeleton of a specimen of Australopithecus afarensis. Recently added to the basement gallery is a display on Selam, found between 2000 and 2004. This archaic fossil is estimated to date to 3.3 million years ago.

In 1936, the concept of a museum was first introduced in Ethiopia when an exhibition was opened, displaying ceremonial costumes donated by the Solomonic dynasty and their close associates. The current NME grew from the establishment of the Institute of Archaeology, which was founded in 1958. The institute was founded to promote and facilitate the archaeological research mission in the northern part of Ethiopia by French archaeologists.

The museum started its activities by exhibiting objects from these excavation missions. With the establishment of the Ethiopian Cultural Heritage Administration in 1976, the idea came up to open a National Museum, which was supported by the Government. The NME began to operate under the National Act which provides for the protection and preservation of antiquities, and has legislative authority governing all sites and monuments throughout the country of Ethiopia. Artists Afewerk Tekle and Mamo Tessema were instrumental in founding the museum, and the latter served as curator.

Later, the National Museum diversified its activities and organised into three working departments, i.e. the conservation department, the documentation department and the exhibition and research department.

The NME at present has four main exhibition sections. The basement is dedicated to archaeological and paleoanthropological sections. This area show the previously mentioned hominids. The first floor contains objects from ancient and medieval periods, as well as regalia and memorabilia from former rulers, who include Emperor Haile Selassie. The second floor shows art work in a chronological order, from traditional to contemporary works. Afewerk Tekle's massive African Heritage is one of the most notable pieces. Another painting depicts the meeting of Solomon and Sheba. The second floor contains a collection of secular arts and crafts, including traditional weapons, jewellery, utensils, clothing and musical instruments. Finally, the third floor has an ethnographic display. Here, the museum tries to give an overview of the cultural richness and variety of the peoples of Ethiopia.

== Gallery ==
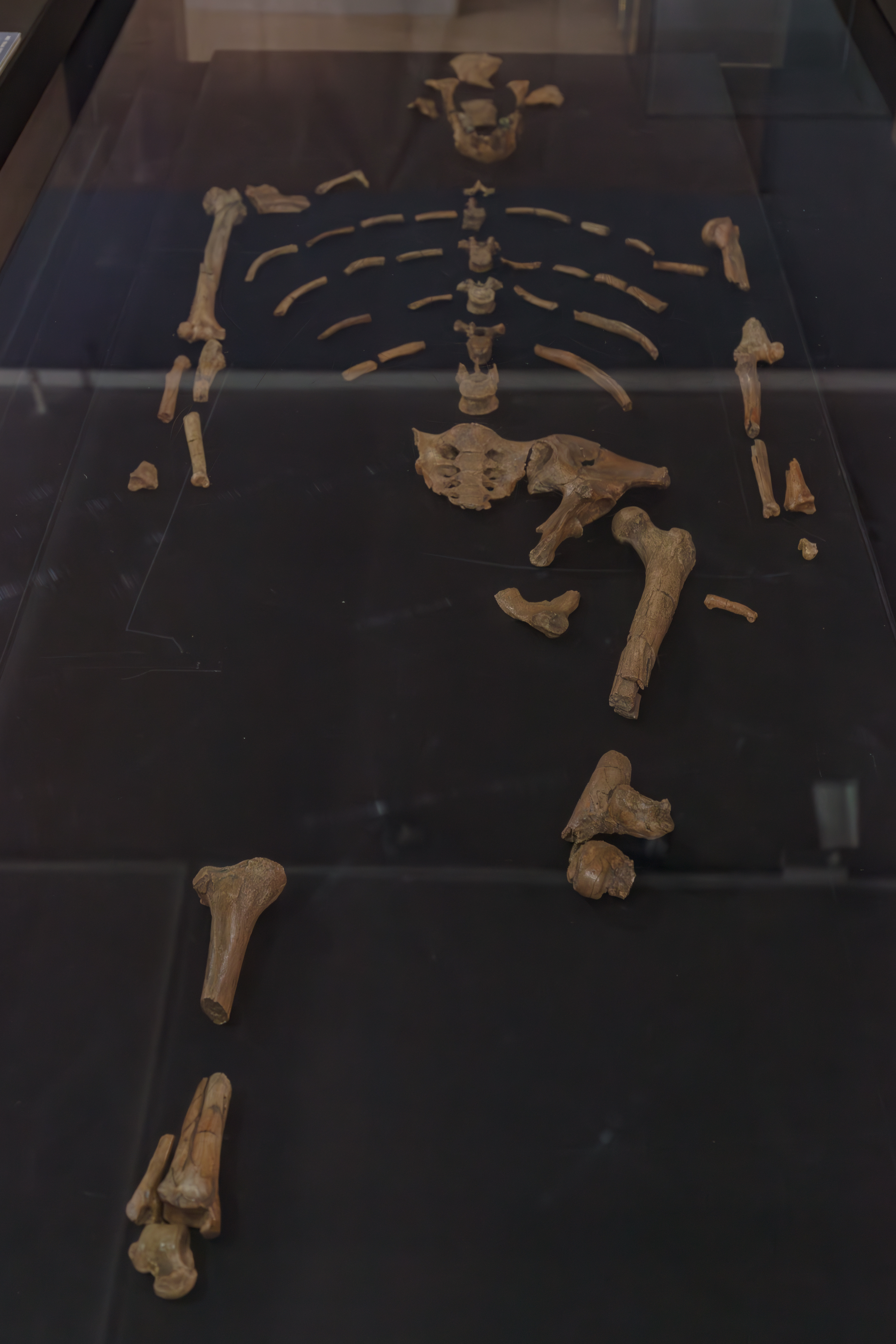
Skeleton of Lucy, the most well-known Australopithecus afarensis fossil, at the National Museum of Ethiopia.

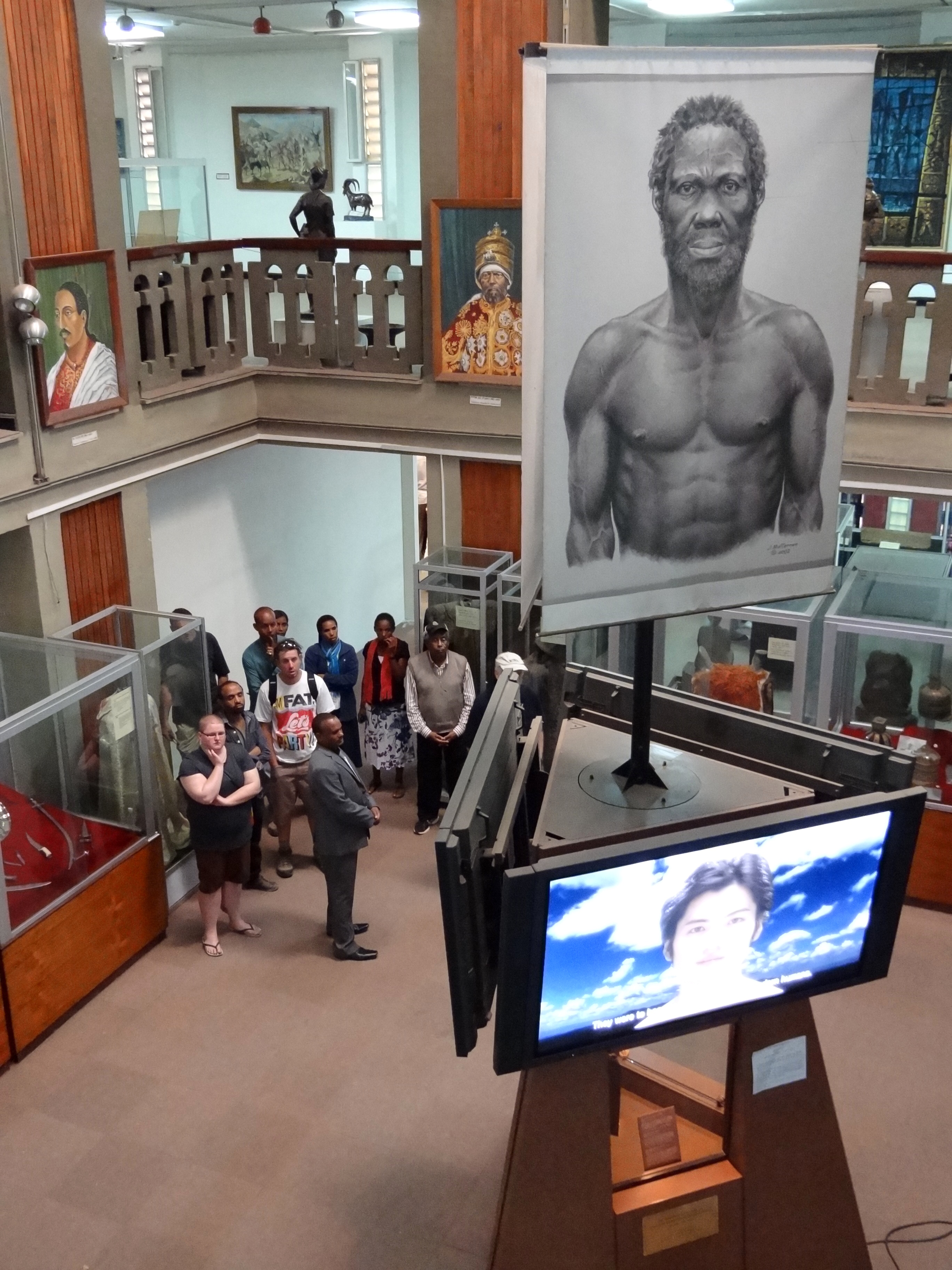
Central Exhibition Hall

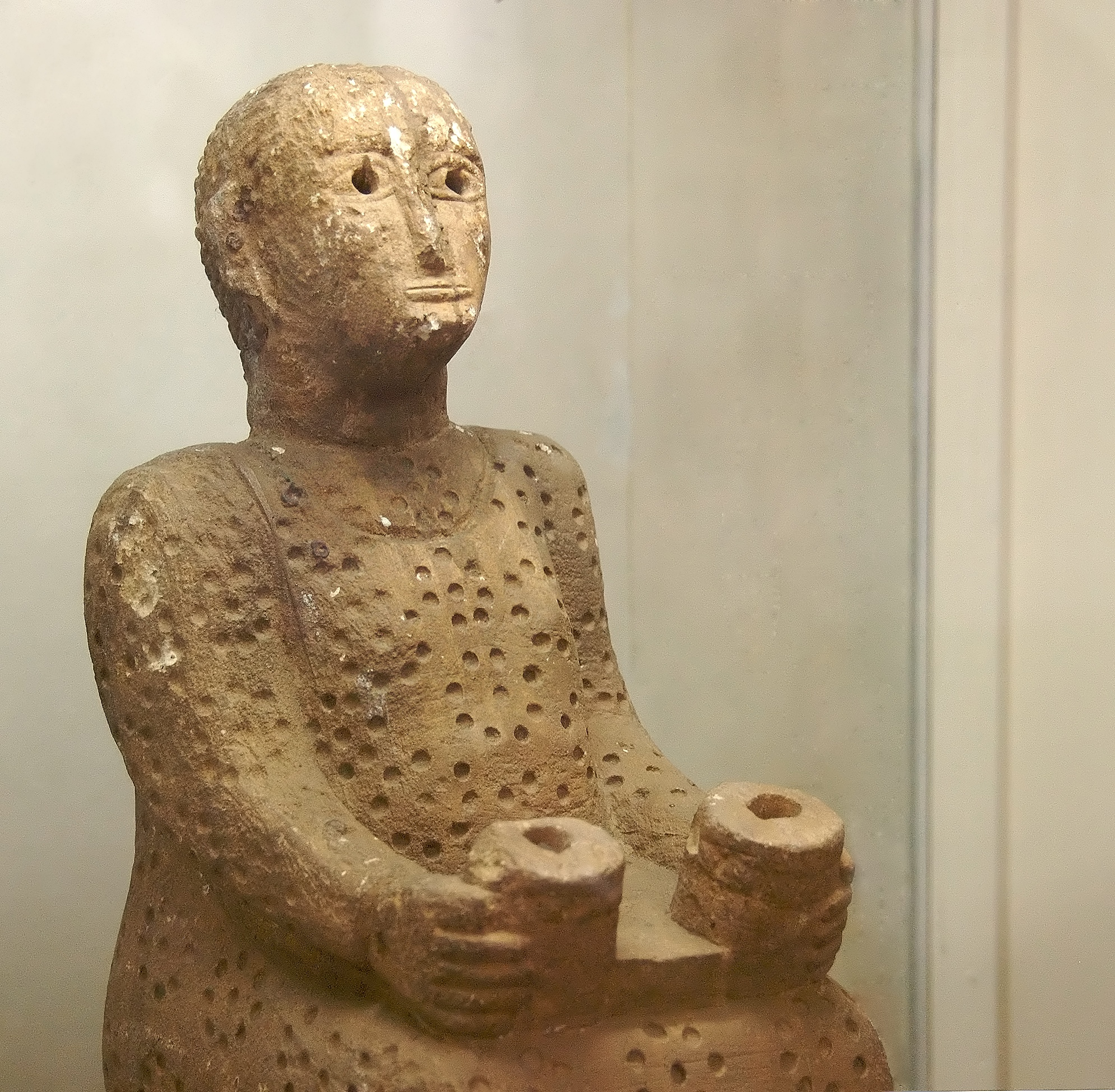
Stone statue from Addi-Galamo, Tigray Region (dated 6th-5th century BCE), part of the National Museum's collection. The statue is inscribed with a phrase in South Arabian, "For God Grants a Child to Yamanat".

New research facility at the National Museum of Ethiopia; on the left is the exhibition hall.

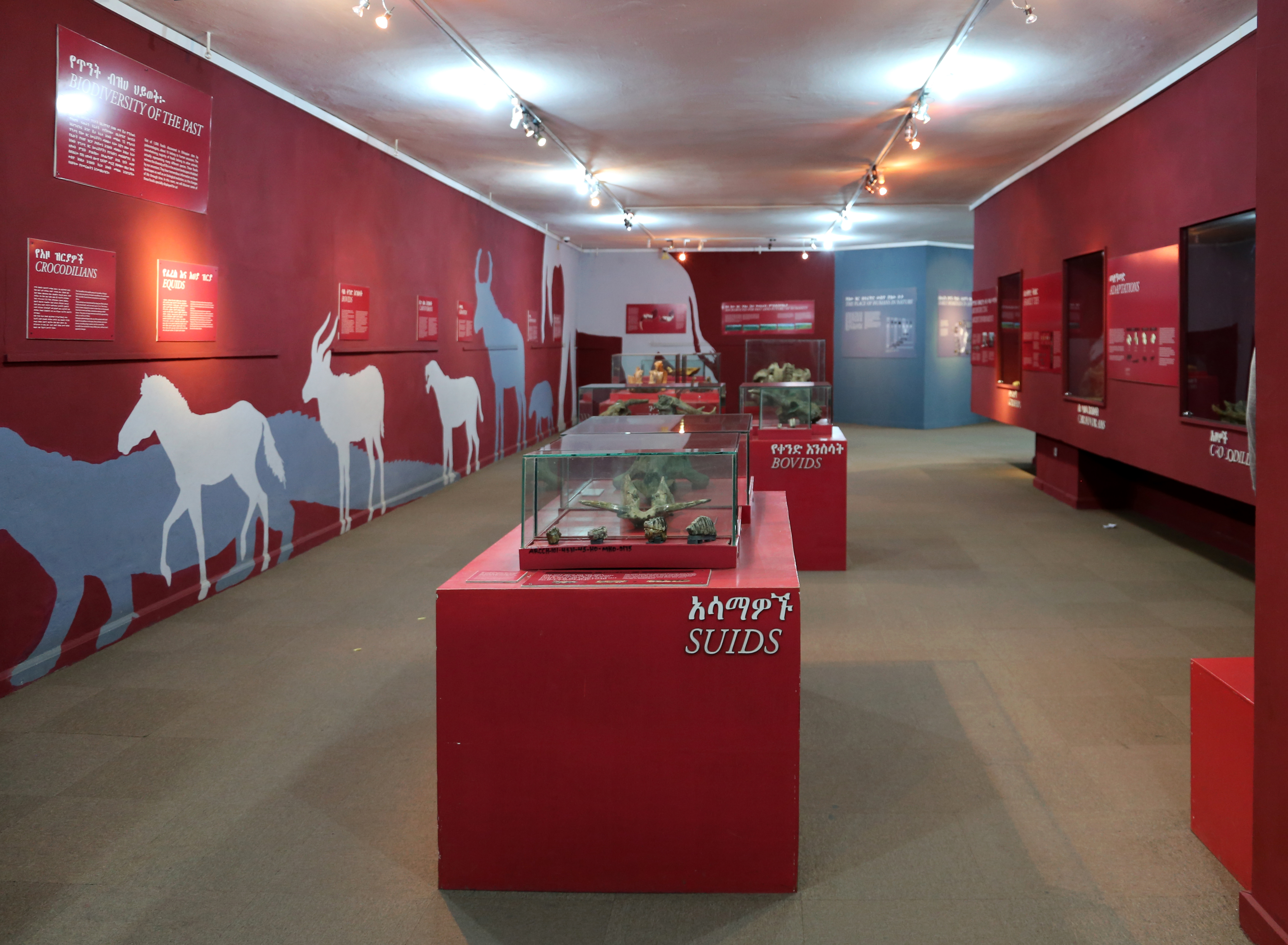
The Basement Gallery for Fossils.

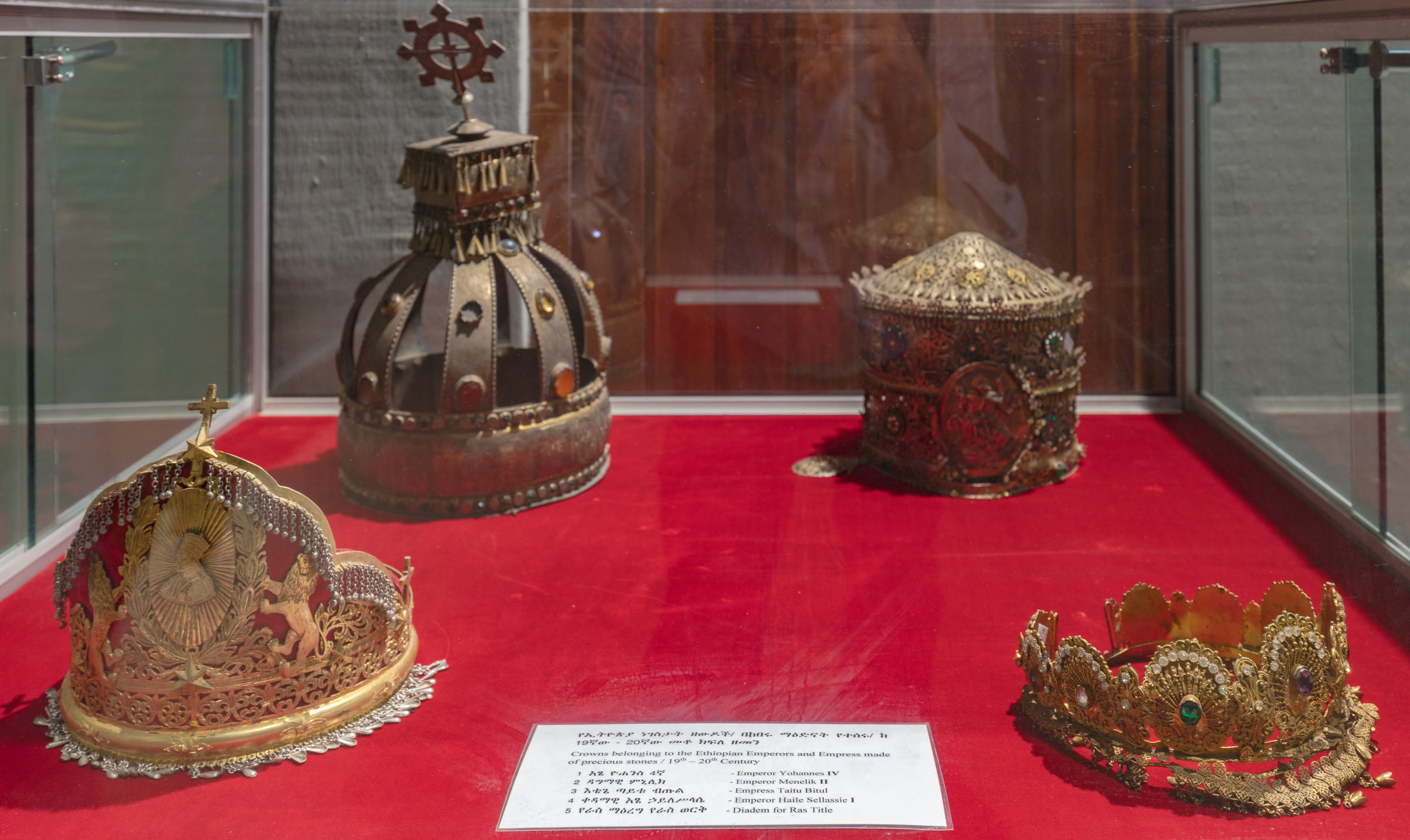
Crowns of Ethiopian emperors.

== See also ==
- Agegnehu Engida
- Kidist Hailu Degaffe
