= Mamo Tessema =

Ethiopian artist and art curator (1935–2007)

Mamo Tessema (1935–2007) was an Ethiopian modernist artist, potter, sculptor, and art curator.

== Early life and education ==
Mamo Tessema was born in Nekemte, Ethiopia. He studied at Teacher's Training School at His Imperial Majesty's Handicraft School. He attended Alfred University's College of Ceramics where he received both a BA degree and an MFA degree, and had a graduate fellowship from 1961 to 1962 at Bennington Potters.

== Career ==
Mamo returned to Ethiopia and taught at the Handicraft School. He was later founder and curator of the Ethiopian National Museum in Addis Ababa.

In describing his prizewinning ceramics in the 1970 annual African Arts award, it was said, "Clearly here is evidence of a significant artistic skill appropriately served by a medium that complements his work by adding its particular style to the vision outlined by the artist. The quality and strength of these pieces renders normally homely material like clay into important art."

His works were displayed in the United States at the Library of Congress and the Smithsonian Institution, among others. His work was exhibited internationally at the First World Festival of Negro Arts in Dakar in 1966 and at Montreal's Expo 67. Mamo's work was included in a traveling exhibit of contemporary African prints curated by the Harmon Foundation and circulated by the Smithsonian Institution. He served head of the Ethiopian National Committee in charge of planning the Second World Festival of African Arts in Nigeria in 1977.

"Mamo enjoyed a long and successful career as an artists, exhibiting internationally from Japan to Mexico, as a museum professional," a scholar wrote. "Under the aegis of the National Museum, he traveled the world promoting Ethiopian art and culture."

Later in life, he lived and worked as a ceramicist in Washington, D.C.

Mamo's works are in the collections of Fisk University and the Bennington Museum. His work was included in the 2023 traveling exhibit, "African Modernism in America, 1947–1967."
