= Tessema Eshete =

Tessema Eshete (27 July 1876 to 13 October 1964) was born in Minjar, Ethiopia, to Amhara parents, his mother Woleteyes Habtu and his father Eshete Gube.

In the year 1908, Tessema was selected by Emperor Menelik and sent to Germany with German concessionaire Arnold Holtz to be trained as the first Ethiopian Automobile driver/auto mechanic. This was to be a life-changing mission for him. He accomplished his training, and also recorded Ethiopia's first music/songs on 17 double sided shellack disks. A not so wealthy young man when he departed, Eshete became one of the richest Ethiopians on his return to the country. He was paid 17,000 Gold Marks by Beka Rekords Berlin, and also earned continuous income from the sale of his disks which were reproduced by HMV Germany in 1912, Odeon Germany in 1931 and Odeon Milan during the brief Italian occupation of Ethiopia 1935-1941.

Tessema was a jack of all trades. He was a poet, a wit, a painter, a sculptor, political appointee, explorer, developer and an accomplished photographer.

His son Ato Yidnekachew Tessema (1921-1987) became "the father of sport in Africa" and wrote a biography of his father.

== Music legacy ==
The music disks Tessema recorded in Germany are now over a century old. They are certainly the oldest for Africa. The Goethe Institute, Addis Ababa, launched the release of the restored version of Eshete's recordings on 20 September 2010. A selection of Tessema 's historic recordings have been reissued for their centennial.

== Bibliography ==
- Yidnekatchew Tessema. Sem Ena Worqu Tessema Eshete. 1992.
- Siegbert Uhlig. (Editor). Proceedings of the XVth International Conference of Ethiopian Studies, Hamburg, July 20–25, 2003. Otto Harrassowitz Verlag, 2006. Pages 404-407. Online text

== Discography ==
- Azmari Tessema Eshete. Ethiopiques 27: Centennial of the First Ethiopian. Buda Records, 2011.
