= Giovanni Antonio Cybei =

Italian sculptor

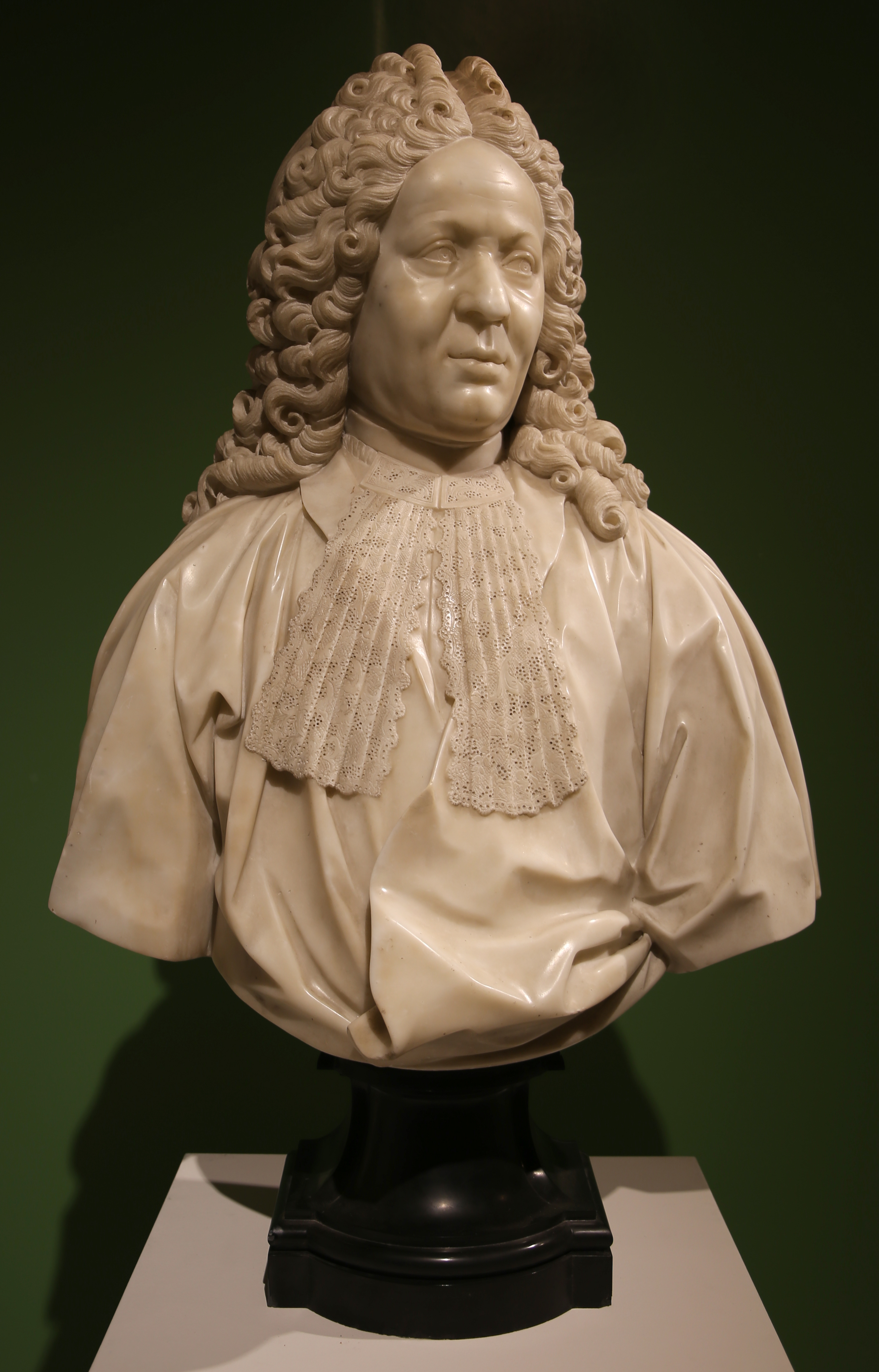
- Portrait of Giovanni Bonaventura Neri, Ferrara, coll. Cavallini Sgarbi
- Born: 3 February 1706; Carrara, Duchy of Massa and Carrara
- Died: 7 September 1784 (aged 78); Carrara, Duchy of Massa and Carrara
- Occupations: Sculptor; Catholic priest
- Movement: Baroque

Giovanni Antonio Cybei (February 3, 1706 – September 7, 1784) was an Italian late-Baroque sculptor. He is best known for is busts depicting important contemporary figures.

== Biography ==
=== Early years ===
Giovanni Antonio Cybei was born in Carrara on February 3, 1706, to a family of Jewish origin. His father died when Cybei was young and it was his uncle, the sculptor Giovanni Baratta, who suggested that the talented boy pursue a career in art. In about 1721 Cybei travelled to Rome to study with Agostino Cornacchini, whom he assisted in the carving of the marble equestrian statue of Charlemagne (c. 1720–25; Rome, St. Peter's, portico). Cybei also studied painting. After a stay in Rome of about seven years, he returned to Carrara and worked with Baratta for nearly a decade. He assisted his uncle on several projects, including the Four Doctors of the Church (1728) for the chapel of Sant'Uberto at Venaria Reale, a royal hunting-lodge near Turin, but he also created works of his own design when not working for Baratta. Among these is the marble figure of St. Augustine for the altar niche of the Caraffa Chapel in Sarzana Cathedral. In 1739 Cybei took holy orders, determining at that point to give up sculpture; but a second trip to Rome renewed his interest, and he remained active in the art for the rest of his life.

=== Mature career ===
A few years after his uncle's death in 1747, Cybei became an independent artist with his own workshop. His numerous statues and ornamental sculptures of urns and trophies decorated gardens across Europe and even in Moscow, although many are of indifferent quality. One of Cybei's first major independent works is the funerary monument to Cardinal Giulio Alberoni (1753; Piacenza, San Lazzaro), which features a marble likeness of the deceased. Cybei also realized his abilities in portraiture with busts of many contemporary figures such as Ludovico Antonio Muratori (1774; Modena, Biblioteca Estense). In the same year he produced another equestrian statue, the colossal Francesco III d'Este, Duke of Modena, erected in the Piazza Sant'Agostino in Modena. Destroyed during the French occupation in 1796, the composition is known through a gesso modello (Bergamo, Accademia Carrara).

Cybei became the first director of the Accademia di Belle Arti di Carrara in 1769. His works generally follow the late Baroque style of Camillo Rusconi and Baratta. However, he was aware of the increasing classical tendencies in mid-18th-century Italian art, and his portraits in particular demonstrate a more classical style.

== Gallery ==
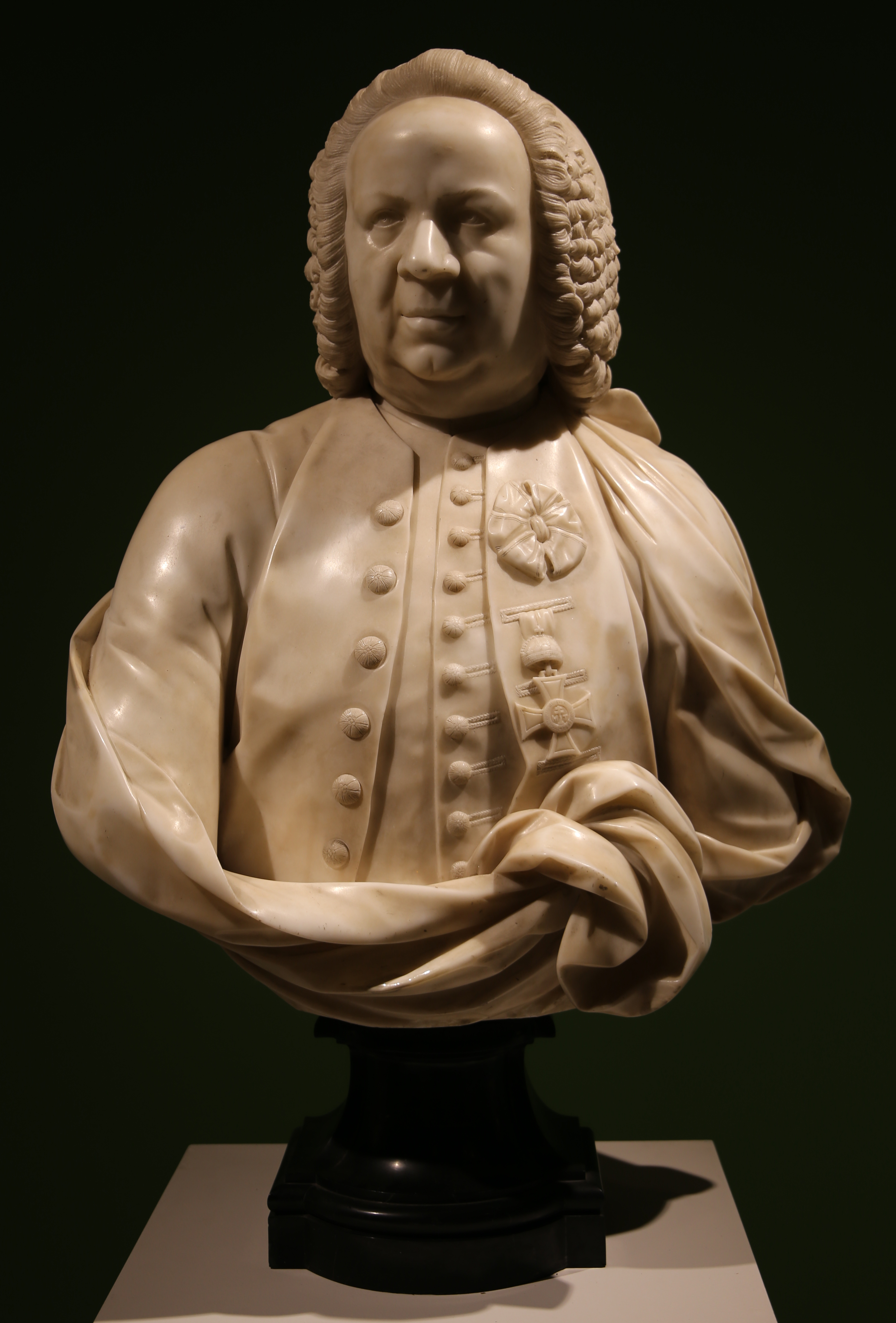
Bust of Pompeo Neri

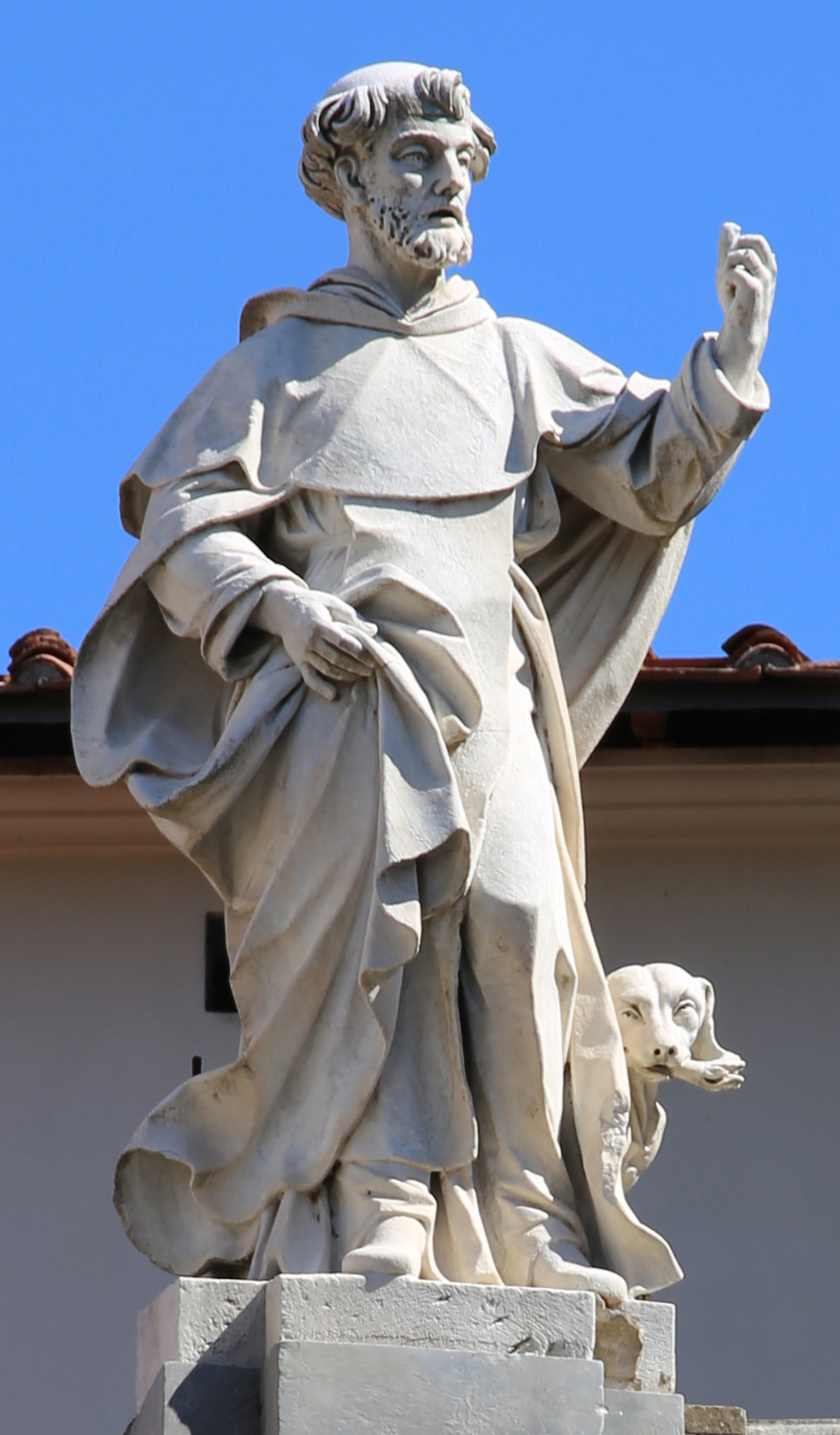
Statue of San Domenico, San Silvestro, Pisa

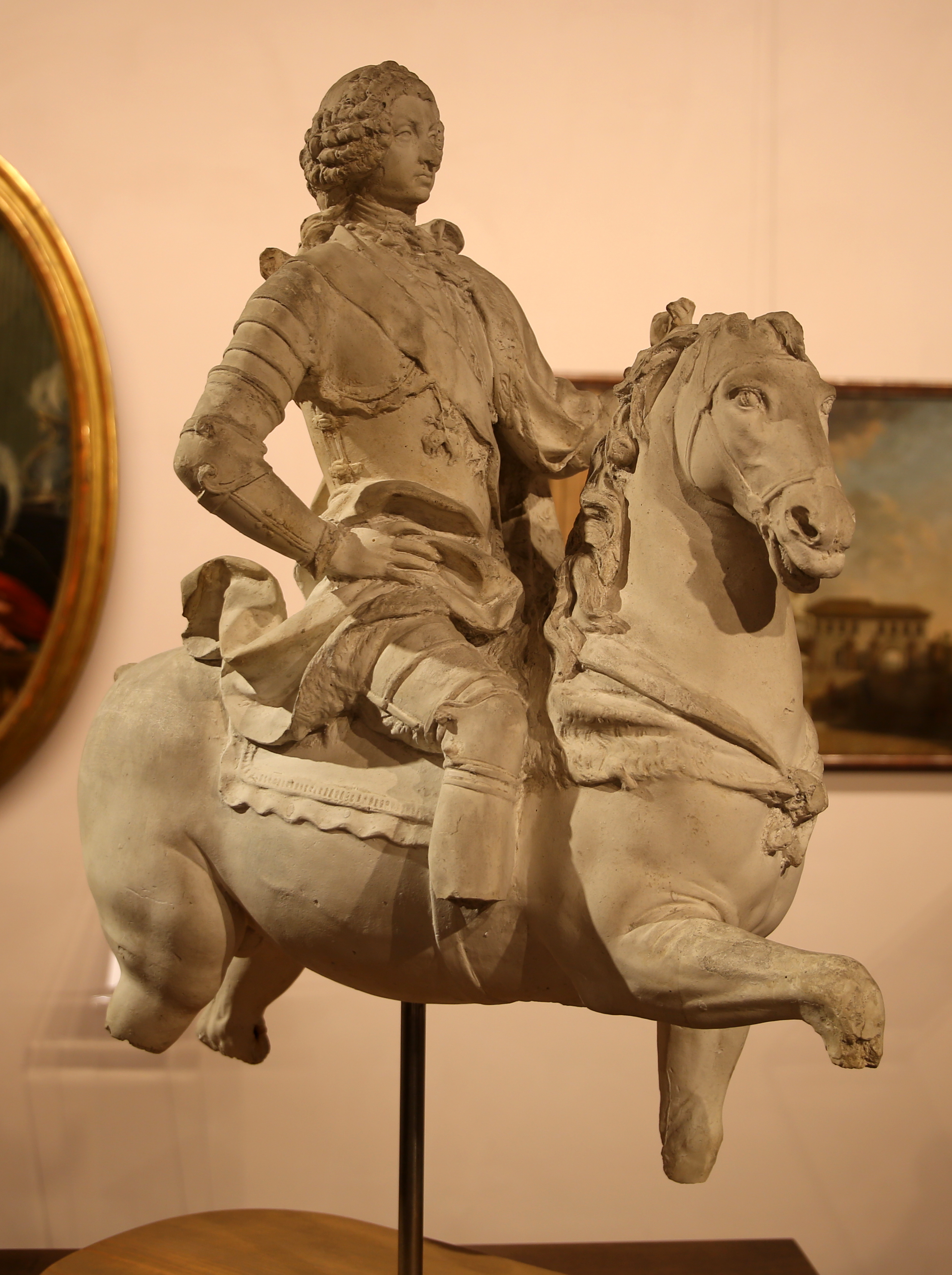
Plaster model of the equestrian statue of Francesco III d'Este

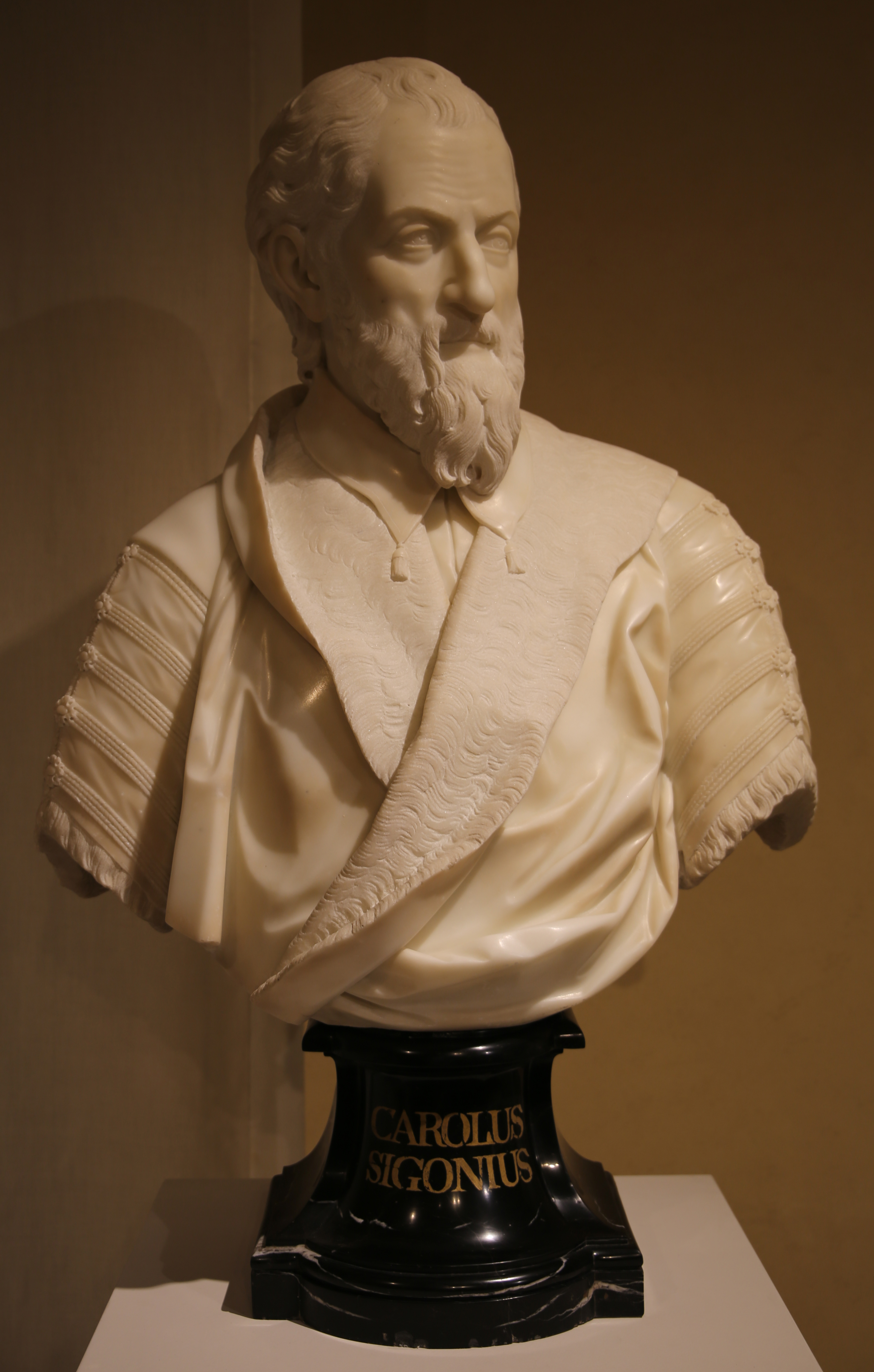
Bust of Carolus Sigonius

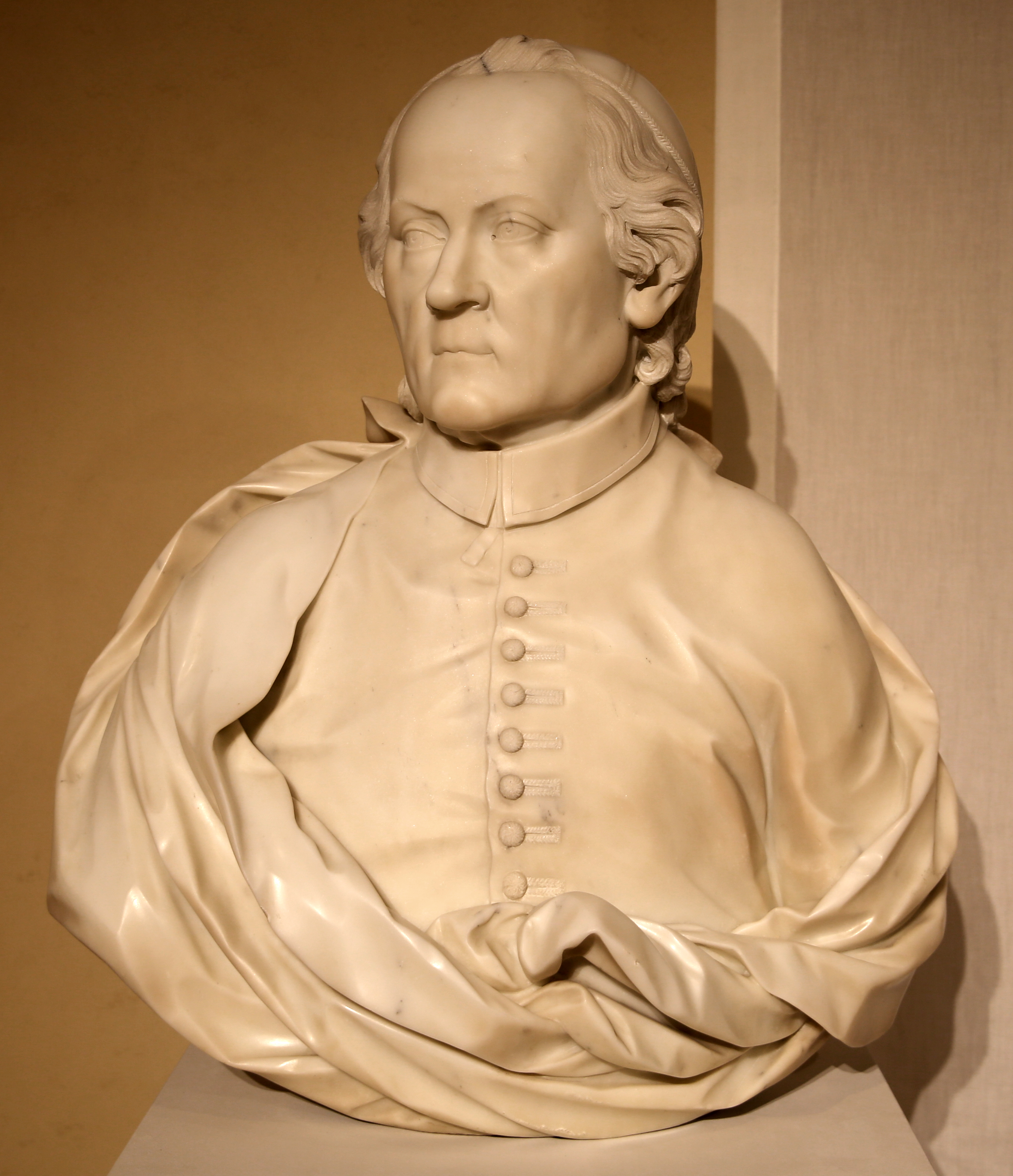
Bust of Ludovico Antonio Muratori

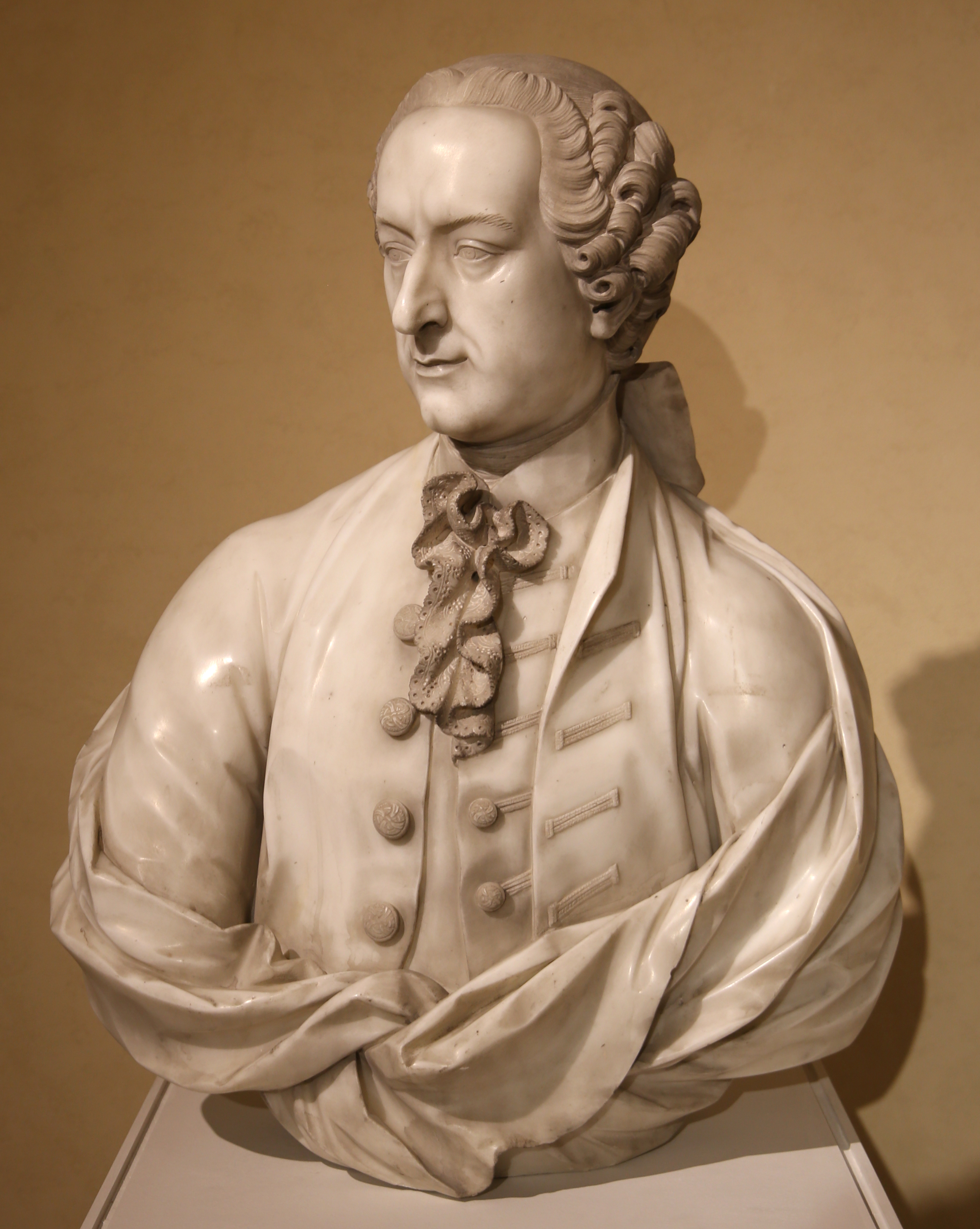
Bust of Count Francesco del Testa

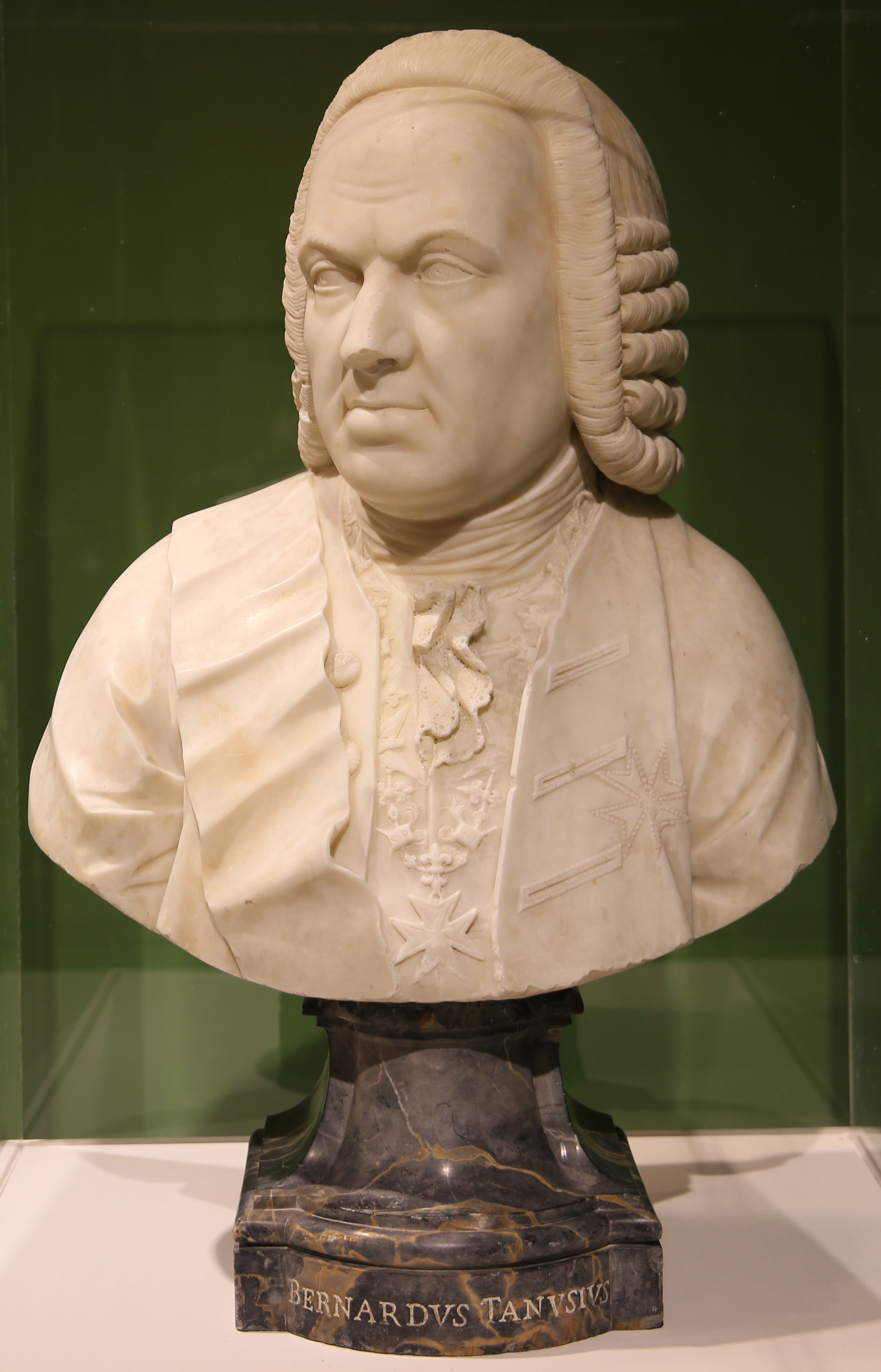
Bust of Bernardo Tanucci

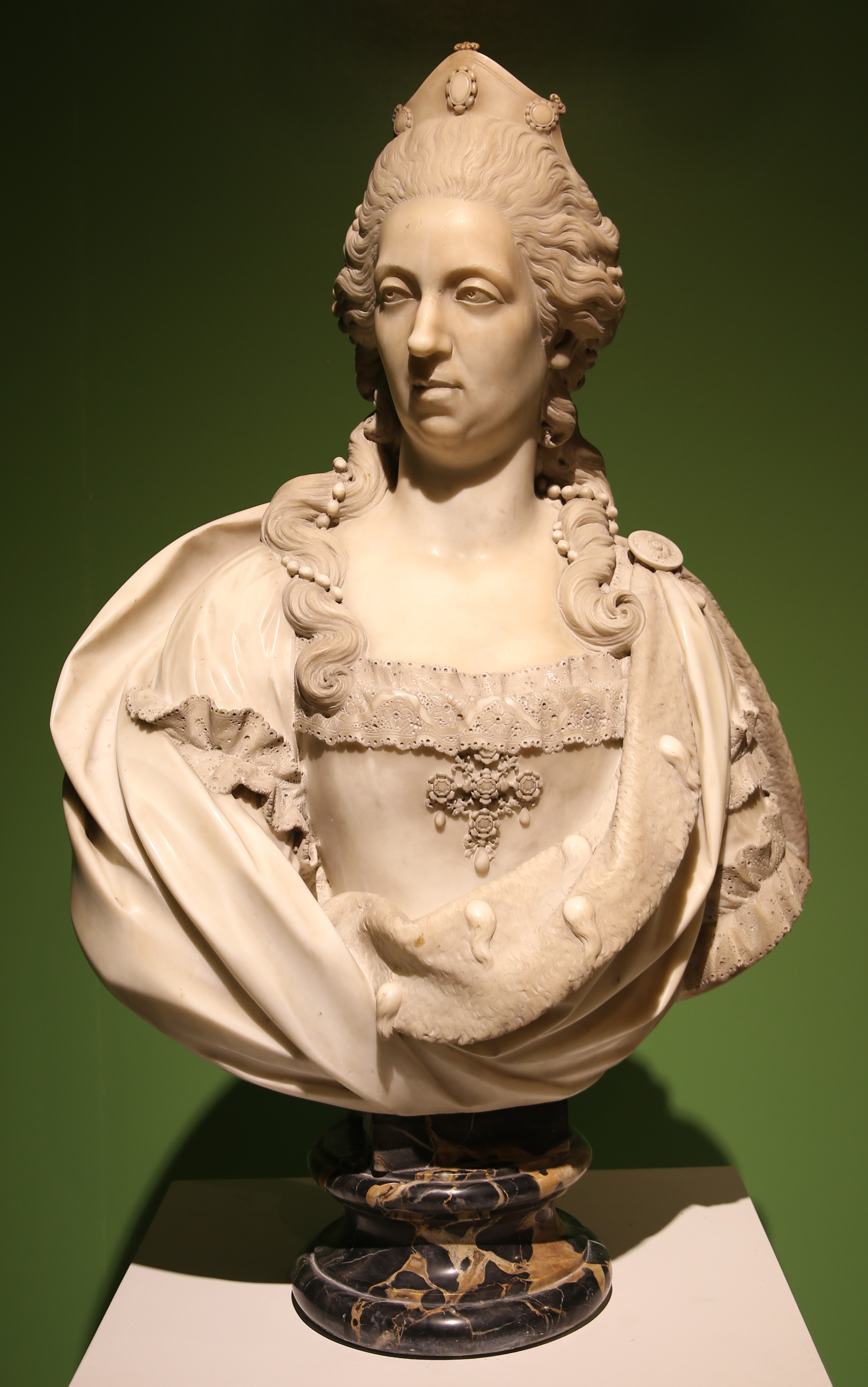
Bust of Maria Teresa Cybo-Malaspina

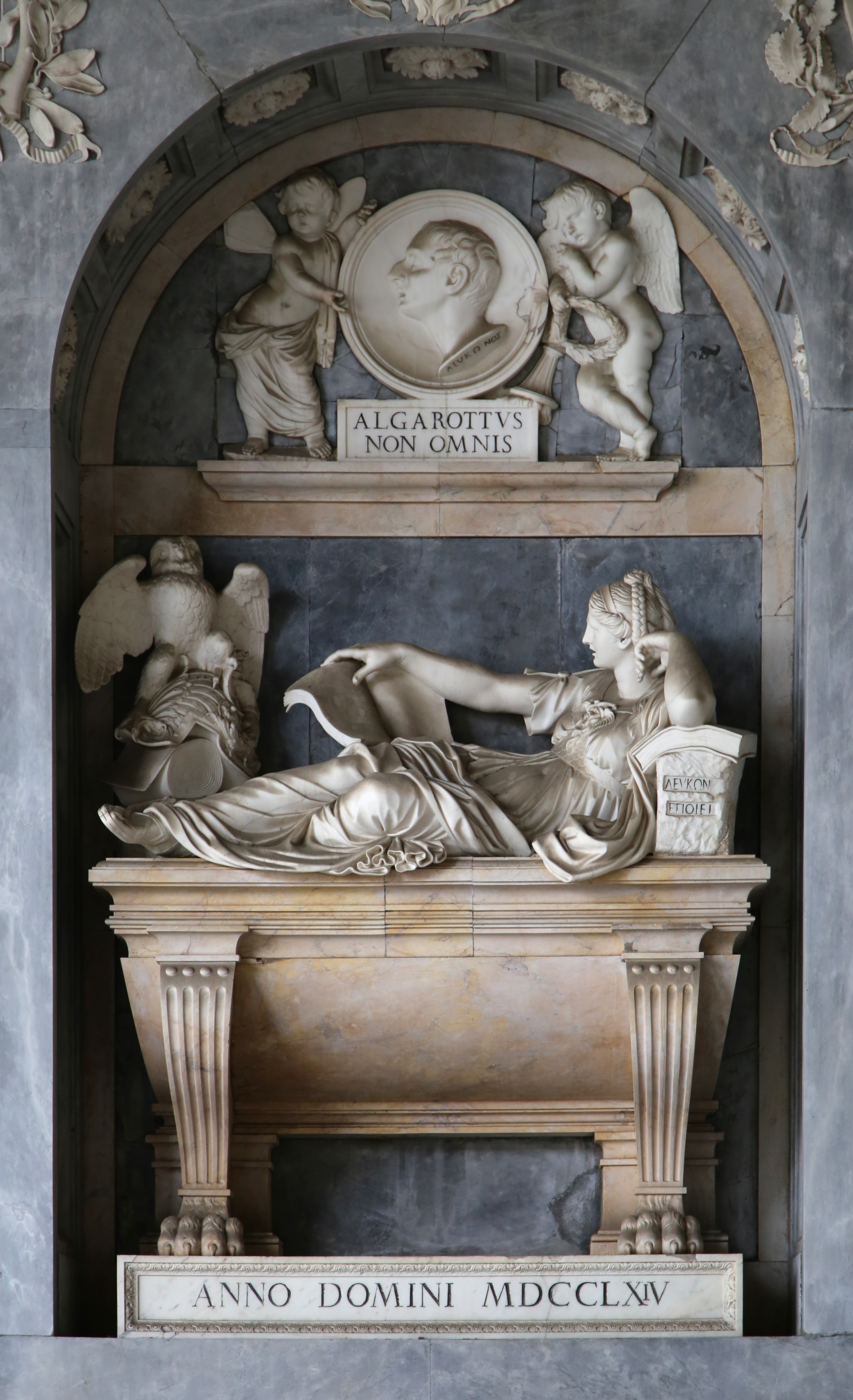
Tomb of Francesco Algarotti

== Bibliography ==
- Tiraboschi, Girolamo (1786). Biblioteca modense: o, notizie della vita e delle opere degli scrittori nati negli stati del serenissimo signor Duca di Modena. Vol. 6. Part II. Modena: presso la Società tipografica. pp. 404–6.
- Gerini, Emanuele (1829). Memorie storiche d'illustri scrittori e di uomini insigni dell'antica e moderna Lunigiana. Vol. 1. Massa: Luigi Frediani. pp. 239–42.
- Campori, Giuseppe (1873). Memorie biografiche degli scultori, architetti, pittori … nativi di Carrara. Modena: Carlo Vincenzi. pp. 80–3.
