= Carrara Academy =

Carrara Academy may refer to:

- The Accademia Carrara di Belle Arti di Bergamo in Bergamo, Italy
- The Accademia di Belle Arti di Carrara, in Carrara, Tuscany, Italy
