= Campori =

Campori is an Italian surname. Notable people with the surname include:

- Anna Campori (1917–2018), Italian actress
- Pietro Campori (c. 1553–1643), Italian cardinal

== See also ==
- Campori Madonna, a painting in the Galleria Estense, Modena, Italy
