= Park Eun-sun =

Park Eun-sun may refer to:

- Park Eun-sun (footballer)
- Park Eun-sun (sculptor)
- Park Eun-sun (taekwondo)
