= Park Eun-sun (sculptor) =

South Korean sculptor

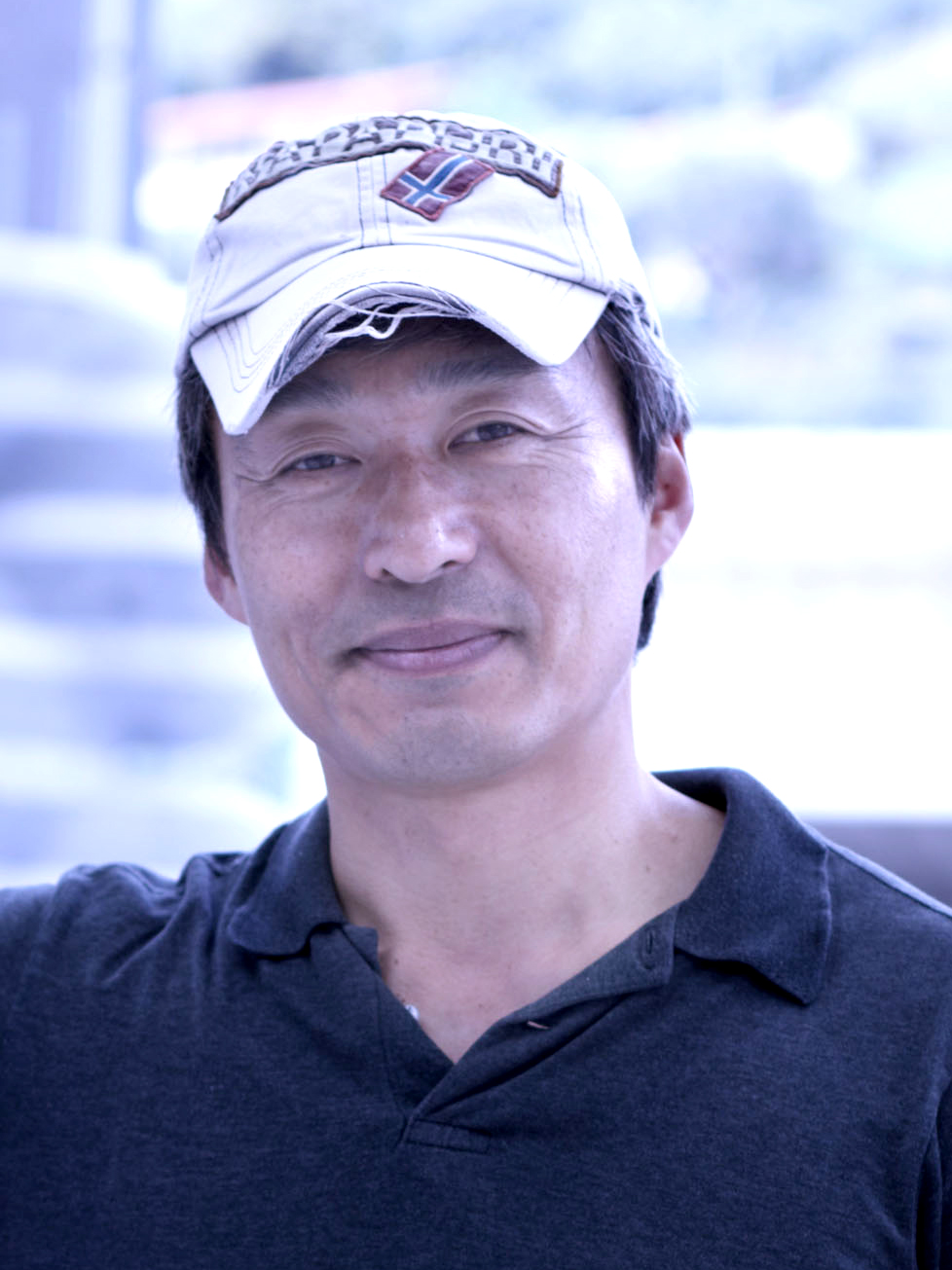
- Born: 1965 (age 60–61); South Korea
- Education: Accademia di Belle Arti di Carrara, Kyung Hee University
- Known for: sculpture

Korean name
- Hangul: 박은선
- Hanja: 朴垠宣
- RR: Bak Eunseon
- MR: Pak Ŭnsŏn

Park Eun-sun (Korean: 박은선, born in 1965) is a South Korean sculptor.

== Early life ==
Park was born in South Korea in 1965. He graduated from the Department of Fine Arts of the Kyung Hee University is Seoul, and later obtained a degree from the Accademia di Belle Arti di Carrara. Since 1993 he has been living and working in Pietrasanta, Italy. Park uses marble from Carrara, about 20 km from Pietrasanta, for much of his work. His pieces often feature two different colors of marble with prominent cracks, and are usually abstract. The first exhibition that attracted the public's attention was "Mostra di scutura in omaggio a SEM" in 1997. It was held in Pietrasanta and he was invited to the group exhibition. He has had a number of solo and group exhibitions in Europe including in Italy, Germany and France (Musée Bernard Boesch) etc.

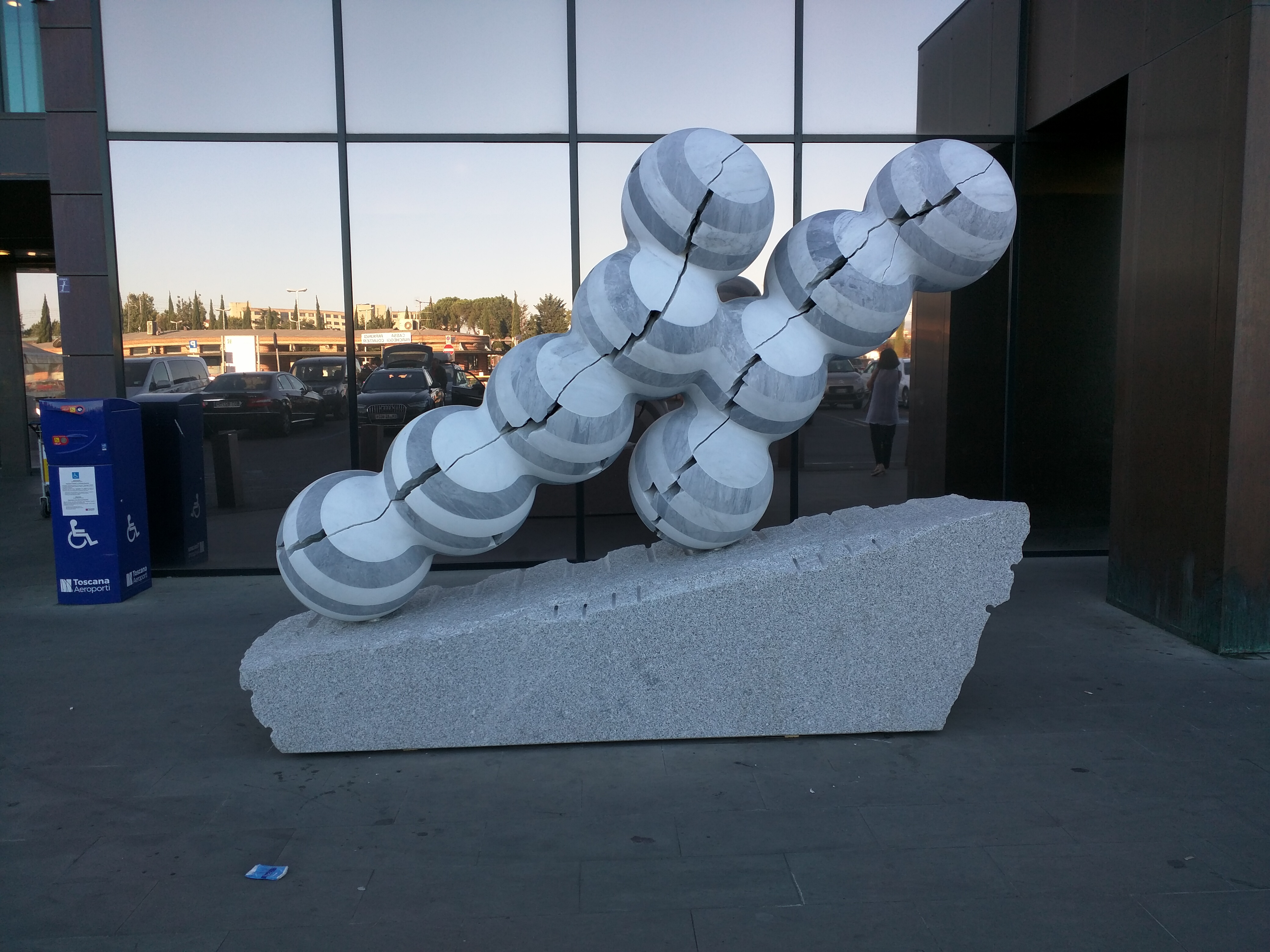
a statue at Florence's airport

== Awards ==
- 2021 - Honorary citizenship of the Municipality of Pietrasanta
- 2018 - Premio Fratelli Rosselli "Pietrasanta e la Versilia nel mondo"
- 2015 - Order of Civil Merit-Seongnuy Medal
- 2009 – Sun Prize in the Arts, Sun Gallery

== Solo exhibitions ==
- 2020

Kyro Art Gallery, Pietrasanta, Italia

- 2019–2020

Giacomo Puccini Square, Viareggio, Italy Pisa International Airport ‘Galileo Galilei’, Pisa, Italy Florence International Airport ‘Amerigo Vespucci’, Florence, Italy

- 2019

Hippodrome San Rossore, Pisa, Italy Art Of The World Gallery, Houston, Texas, United States of America Monumental Exhibition for Island National Festival 1st Edition, Sam-Hak Island, Mokpo, South Korea

- 2018

International Award ‘Pietrasanta and Versilia in the World’, Pietrasanta, Italy ThePage Gallery, Seoul, South Korea Art Busan 2018, BEXCO Square, Busan, South Korea Le Musée Galeria d’Art, La Ville Bernard Boesch, La Baule, France Hotel Principe, Forte dei Marmi, Italy

- 2017

Park Eun Sun e il Monumentale, Palazzo Panichi, Museo dei Bozzetti, Pietrasanta, Italy Duomo Square, Chiesa e Chiostro di Sant’Agostino, Pontile di Marina di Pietrasanta, Italy Mazzini Square, Viareggio, Italy Vecchiato Arte Gallery, Pietrasanta, Italy City Center, Padua, Italy Vecchiato Arte Gallery, Padua, Italy

- 2016

Korean Cultural Center, Rome, Italy Piazzale Michelangelo, Piazza Pitti, Aeroporto A. Vespucci, Giardino delle Rose, San Miniato al Monte, Palazzo Vecchio - Cortile dei Leoni, Florence, Italy

- 2015

Pisa International Airport 'Galileo Galilei’, Pisa, Italy Florence International Airport ‘Amerigo Vespucci’, Florence, Italy Forte dei Marmi, Italy Villa Ghirlanda, Cinisello, Milan, Italy Forte di Bard (Museum), Bard, Aosta, Italy Art Center Materima - Studio Copernico, Casalbeltrame, Novara, Italy Altes Bad Pfäfers, Bad Ragaz, Switzerland Mark Peet Visser Gallery, Heusden, Netherlands

- 2014

Traiano’s Market - Museum of Fori Imperiali, Roma, Italy Lacke&Farben Gallery, Berlin, Germany Le Musée Galeria d’Art, La Villa Boesch, Atlantia, La Baule, France City Center, La Baule, France

- 2013

City Center, Lugano, Switzerland Hotel Principe Leopoldo, Lugano, Switzerland Urbengsschlass Gallery, Hesperange, Luxembourg ’La Comune de Hesperange’ Park, Hesperange, Luxembourg Materima, Studio Copernico, Casalbetrame, Novara, Italy

- 2012

Villa Bertelli Foundation, Forte dei Marmi, Italy Carlina Gallery, Turin, Italy Arena Studio d’Arte, Verona, Italy

- 2011

Miniaci Gallery, Milan, Italy 'MARMOMACC 2011’ Henraux Foundation, Verona, Italy

- 2010

City CenterAlba, Miroglio, Alba, Italy City Center, Barolo, Italy Dosi Gallery, Busan, South Korea

- 2009

Marino Marini Museum, Florence, Italy Quattro Mori, Milan, Italy Sun Gallery, SUN Art Center, Seoul, South Korea

- 2008

Gana Art Gallery, Seoul, South Korea

- 2007

‘La Versiliana’ Park, Pietrasanta, Italy

- 2006

Absolute Art Gallery, Knokke, Belgium Mark Peet Visser Gallery, Heusden, Netherlands University of Zürich, Zürich, Switzerland

- 2005

San Giorgio Gallery, Milan, Italy

2004 Park Ryu Sook Gallery, Seoul, South Korea

2003 Carlina Gallery, Turin, Italy Swinger Art Gallery, Verona, Italy

- 2002

Studio SEM, Pietrasanta, Italy

- 2001

Park Ryu Sook Gallery, Seoul, South Korea RHO Gallery, Seoul, South Korea

- 2000

Bernd Dürr Gallery, München, Germany

- 1997

Park Ryu Sook Gallery, Seoul, South Korea

- 1996

Bernd Dürr Gallery, München, Germany Zehntscheuer Gallery, Münsingen, Germany

- 1995

Gadarte Gallery, Florence, Italy Duemme Gallery, Genoa, Italy

== Group exhibitions ==
- 2020

“Materia”, Kyro Art Gallery, Pietrasanta, Italy

- 2019

Art Busan BEXCO, Busan, South Korea 17th KIAF Korea International Art Fair, Coex, Seoul, South Korea

- 2018

I Marmi di Henraux, San Miniato, Italy Art Busan BEXCO, Busan, South Korea Monaco Yacht Show, Montecarlo 17th KIAF Korea International Art Fair, Coex, Seoul, South Korea

- 2017

Art Fair od Bologna, Italy ‘Park Eun Sun e il suo Atelier’, Sala Putti, Chiostro di Sant’Agostino, Pietrasanta, Italy 16th KIAF Korea International Art Fair, Coex, Seoul, South Korea

- 2016

Arte Downtown, Padua, Italy Arte Padova 2016, Vecchiato Arte, Padua, Italy 15th KIAF Korea International Art Fair, Coex, Seoul, South Korea Sculpture Biennale Changwon, Changwon, South Korea

- 2015

BARCU International Art Fair of Bogotá, Bogotá, Colombia Sculpture Triennale, Bad Ragaz, Vaduz, Switzerland FIA International Art Fair of Caracas, Venezuela 14th KIAF Korea International Art Fair, Coex, Seoul, South Korea CONTEXT International Art Fair od Miami, United States of America

- 2014~2015

‘Michelangelo e La Versilia’ Italian Cultural Center, New York, United States of America

- 2014

‘ART STAGE’ Singapore 2014, Singapore 13th ‘KIAF' Korea International Art Fair, Coex, Seoul, South Korea

- 2013

Ocean Reef Islands, Panama City, Luz Botero Fine Art Gallery, Panama Seoul Art Show 2013, Seoul, South Korea 12th ‘KIAF’ Korea International Art Fair, Coex, Seoul, South Korea ‘BERLINER LISTE’ 2013 Contemporary Art Fair, Berlin, Germany The First Biennial of the South in Panama 2013, ‘Summoning Worlds’, Panama K-Sculpture 2013 Korea Sculpture Festival, Fiesole, Italy Sun Gallery ‘Korea Abstract’, Sun Art Center, Seoul, South Korea

- 2012

Shanshui Man, Lig Art SpaceSeoul, South Korea ‘Tra Cielo e Terra’, Ascona, Switzerland ‘Arte Padova 2012' Arena Studio d’arte, Padua, Italy Museum of Art, Seoul National University, Seoul, South Korea Art Fair Bologna 2012, Galleria Carlina, Bologna, Italy K-Sculpture 2012 Korea Sculpture Festival, Pietrasanta, Italy

- 2011

'Sign Off Design’, Slide Art, Venice, Italy 29th Korean Galleries Art Fair, Seoul, South Korea Versilia Wine Arte, Pietrasanta, Italy 'Sign Off Design’, Palazzo delle Esposizione, Turin, Italy

- 2010

28th Korean Galleries Art Fair, Busan, South Korea 'Scultura in Valigia’, Insa Gallery, Seoul, South Korea Museo del Vino, Barolo, Italy Marmo Fiera, CosMave, Carrara, Italy

- 2009

(New acquisitions 2008) National Museum of Contemporary and Modern Art, South Korea 'Scultura in Valigia', Montgomery Museum of Fine Arts, Alabama, United States of America

- 2008

I Segreti...del Mestiere - Artisti per il Duomo, Pitrasanta, Italy Scultura Internazionale - Scultura Natura Oriente Occidente 2008, Turin, Italy Oisterwijk Sculture 2009, Entienne&Van den Del, Expressivee Contemporary Art, Netherlands 17 Artisti Rappresentanti Coreani di Oggigiorno, Park Ryu Sook Gallery, Seoul, South Korea

- 2007

‘Sculpture in the Garden’, Harold Martin Botanical Gardens, University of Leicester, England

- 2006

Art Fair ‘LINEART’, Ghent, Belgium Holland Art Fair 2006 (HAF), DenHaag, Netherlands Salon Primavera Rotterdam, Rotterdam, Netherlands Sculture EN PLEIN AIR, Turin, Italy Absolute Art Gallery, Brugge, Belgium

- 2005

MPV Gallery, Heusden, Netherlands Art Fair, Studio Copernico, Verona, Italy ‘I Segni e le Forme, Due Passi nell’Arte’, Pietrasanta, Italy Scultura ‘Amor Marmoris’, Levigliani, Italy Arte Fiera, Sangiorgio Gallery, Bari, Italy The 5th Anniversary Exhibition of Samsung TESCO, Insa Art Center, Seoul, Corea del Sud 'The Best of…’, Insa Gallery, Seoul, South Korea

- 2004

‘The Milano International Modern Arts Show’, Palazzo della Permanente, Milan, Italy

- 2003

Park Ryu Sook 20th Anniversary, Seoul, South Korea ‘Sculpture in the Garden’, Harold Martin Botanical Gardens, University of Leicester, England Art Fair ‘Bologna 2003’, Galleria Carlina, Bologna, Italia Art Fair ‘MIART’, Galleria Carlina, Swinger Art, Milano, Italia Art Fair, Swinger Art Gallery, Verona, Italy Magnetismi delle Forme, Scultori in Centrale ENEL Santa Barbara di Capriglia, Italy ‘Arte per la Vita’, Hotel Kraft, Florence, Italy Heiri Festival 2003, Park Ryu Sook Gallery, Seoul, South Korea ‘Sculture Carezzate da un Vento Etrusco’, ENEL, Piombino, Italy

- 2002

Art Fair ‘Cologne’, Park Ryu Sook Gallery, Cologne, Germany Art Fair ‘Altissima’, Turin, Italy Art Fair ‘Post’, Park Ryu Sook Gallery, Seoul, South Korea World Cup Stadium Installation, Suwon, South Korea ‘L’acqua e la vita, Magnetismi delle Forme’, ENEL, Italy

- 2001

Art Fair ‘Cologne’, Park Ryu Sook Gallery, Cologne, Germany Bell’Arte Gallery, Maastricht, Netherlands

- 2000

Arte Fiera ‘Cologne’, Park Ryu Sook Gallery, Cologne, Germany Die45, Kunst Messe München2000, Germany Bell’Arte Gallery, Maastricht, Netherlands Arte&Città 2000, Bologna, Italy

- 1999

Arte Fiera ‘Cologne’, Park Ryu Sook Gallery, Cologne, Germany Bell’Arte Gallery, Maastricht, Netherlands

- 1998

Arte Fiera ‘Basel', Switzerland Sculture On The Wall, Galleria Sai, Seoul, South Korea The Swiss Grand Hotel 10thAnniversary&GalleriaSamtuh’s, Seoul, South Korea ‘L’Infinito Possibili’, Pianeta Azzurro Museum, Rome, Italy Park Ryu Sook Gallery 15th Anniversary, Seoul, South Korea

- 1997

Unformed, 4 Scultori, Main Galley, Seoul, South Korea Mostra di Scultura in omaggio a SEM, Pietrasanta, Italy

- 1996

Open Arte96 München Bernd Dürr Gallery, München, Germany Chilford Hall, Cambridge, England ‘Two Sculptors’, Galleria Ars Polonia, Varsavia, Poland In attesa dell’Alba, Pietrasanta, Italy Scultori e Pittori Contemporanei, Zehntscheuer, Germany

- 1995

Il Gatto, Florence, Italy Art Fair ‘MIART’, Milan, Italy 1st Natura ut Scultura, Camaiore, Italy

- 1994

Pietra Lavorata, San Nicolò, Italy Cardo D’Argento, Florence, Italy

- 1993

Hoo In Gallery, Seoul, South Korea Ho-Am SamSung Art Museum, Seoul, South Korea

- 1991

National Museum of Modern and Contemporary Art, South Korea
