= San Silvestro, Pisa =

Church building in Pisa, Italy

Coordinates: 43°42′51.26″N 10°24′35.26″E

Church of San Silvestro
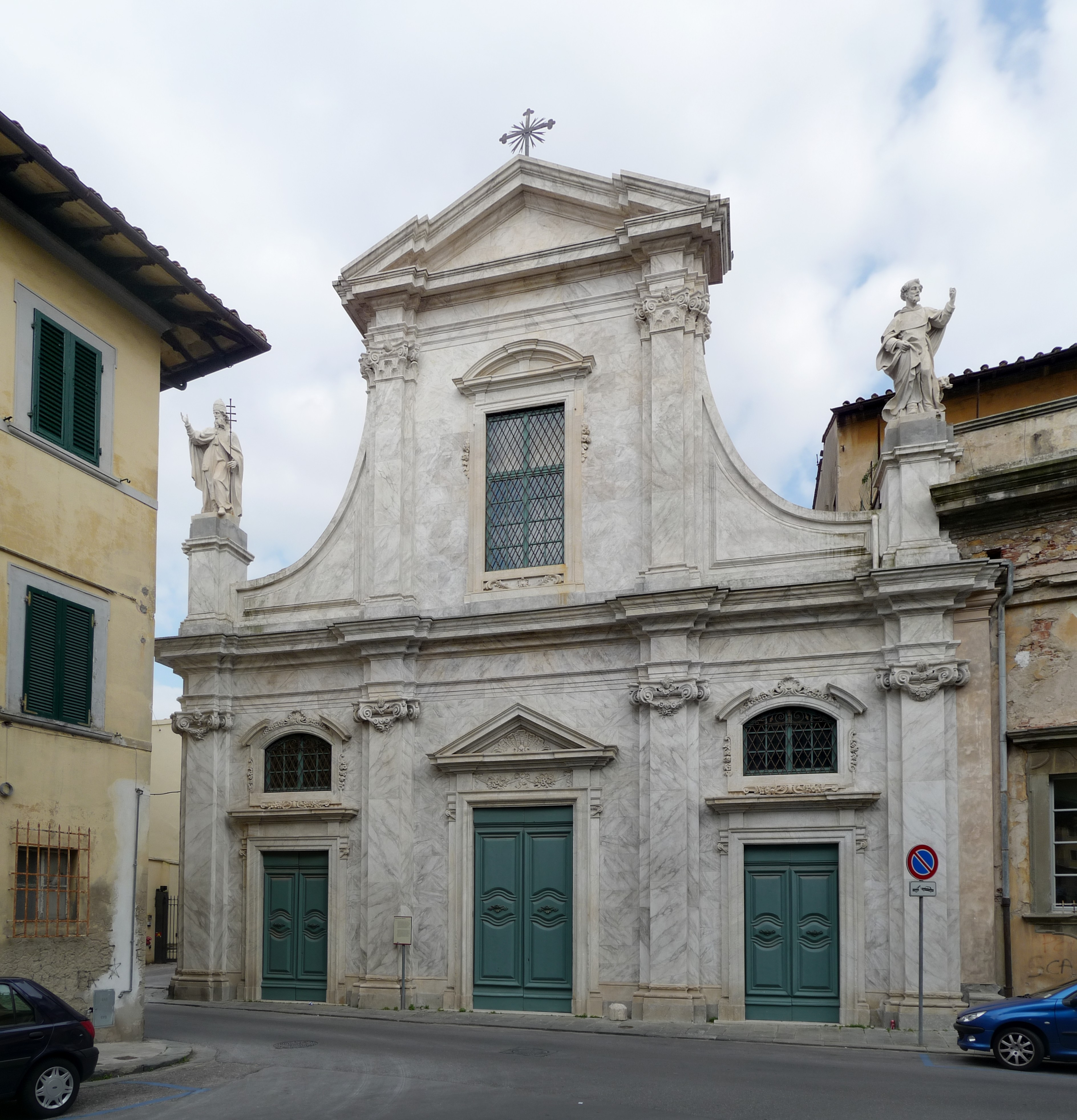

Religion
- Affiliation: Roman Catholic
- Province: Pisa

Location
- Location: Pisa, Italy
- Interactive map of Church of San Silvestro

Architecture
- Type: Church
- Groundbreaking: 1118
- Completed: 1772

San Silvestro is a former church in Pisa, Italy, facing piazza San Silvestro. It is now deconsecrated.

== History ==
In 1118, the religious structure was given to the Benedictines from Montecassino. In the 14th century it came into Dominican hands. The present façade was built in 1770-1772 by the architects Giuseppe Vaccà and Anton Francesco Quarantotti.

The façade once featured a sculptured 12th century architrave with Story of San Silvestro, now found in the National Museum of San Matteo, Pisa, along with other works from this church. The two statues of Saints Domenico and Silvestro are works by Giovanni Antonio Cybei. The wooden ceiling inside was carved in 1612 by Cosimo Pugliani, and has paintings by Aurelio Lomi.

== Sources ==
- Barsali, U.; U. Castelli; R. Gagetti; O. Parra (1999). Storia e Capolavori di Pisa. Florence: Bonechi.
- Donati, Roberto. Pisa. Arte e storia. Narni: Plurigraf.
