= Campori Madonna =

Painting by Antonio da Correggio

Madonna with child
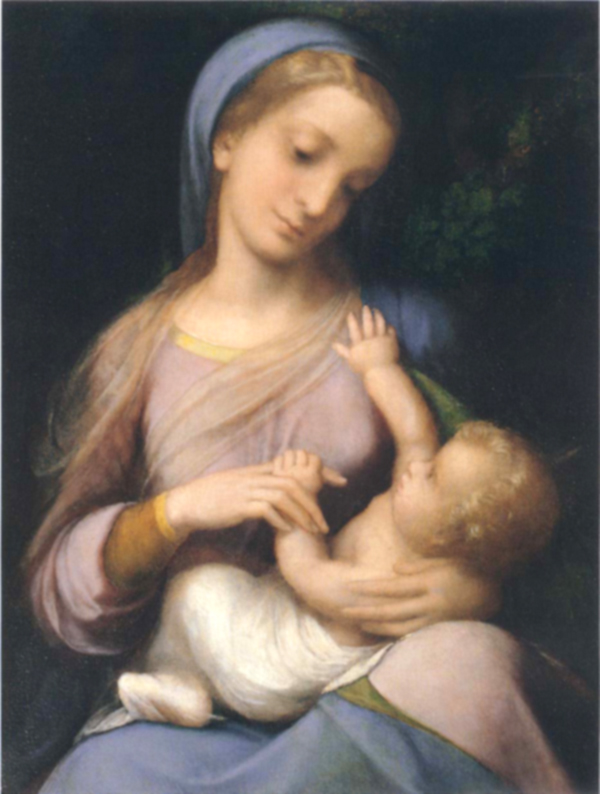
- Year: c. 1510s (Julian)
- Dimensions: 58 cm (23 in) × 45 cm (18 in)

The Campori Madonna is an oil-on-panel painting executed ca. 1517–18 by the Italian Renaissance painter Antonio da Correggio.

== History ==
The attribution to Correggio, first proposed in 1852 by the painter Vincenzo Rasori, is widely accepted. The painting is now in the Galleria Estense in Modena, to which it was left by Marchese Giuseppe Campori in 1894. It is unknown who commissioned it, but before 1894 it had been in a chapel at Soliera Castle near Mantua, which was part of the Campori estates from 1636 onwards.

== Description ==
It can be stylistically dated to c.1517–18, around the same time as Correggio's Madonna and Child with the Infant John the Baptist and his production of the frescoes in the Camera di San Paolo. It shows Correggio moving away from the influence of Leonardo da Vinci and towards that of Raphael, particularly the latter artist's Madonna of Foligno and Tempi Madonna.
