= Giuseppe Campori =

Italian politician

Marquis Giuseppe Campori (Modena, 17 January 1821 – Modena, 19 July 1887) was an Italian scholar, politician, historian and collector of Italian art.

== Biography ==
Son of the marquis Carlo Campori and of the countess Marianna Bulgarini, Giuseppe belonged to one of the most prominent Modenese families, attested since the fifteenth century... In 1829 he began his studies at the prestigious Collegio San Carlo in Modena, having as teacher the physicist Stefano Marianini and the poet Giuseppe Riva. After completing his studies he made a series of journeys to Rome, Naples, Venice and Florence, before stopping in Vienna for eight months as part of the entourage of the Archduke Maximilian of Austria-Este, brother of Duke Francis IV. The long Viennese stay led to the first of a long series of artist biographies: Delle opere di pittori modenesi (On the works of Modenese painters) preserved at the Imperial Belvedere Gallery in Vienna.

Among his most important works is the volume Italian and foreign artists in the Estense States, published in Modena in 1855, a catalogue of the artists who lived or worked under the House of Este, with precious and unpublished documentary news. Also in that year, 1855, Campori made a long journey to France and England, where he was struck by a serious lung disease, which would have accompanied him until his death, in 1887.

Following the annexation of Modena to the Savoyard state in 1860, the marquis was elected in the first Italian Parliament as a representative of the city college and subsequently held the office of mayor for two terms. His political and scientific activity was accompanied by a passion for collecting, that led him to gather a vast number of handwritten papers, paintings, art works and printed books.

His commitment to the preservation of the memory of his homeland is reflected by his last wishes, expressed in 1884, when he was still alive, and then with a posthumous act, in 1887, with which he left his rich patrimony of manuscripts and art works to the city of Modena. Part of the rich collection of drawings and prints, along with art books and shelves, went to the Poletti Library; the Estense Library inherited the collection of handwritten and manuscript papers, while miniatures, drawings and paintings, including the famous Campori Madonna by Correggio, were donated to the Gallerie Estensi. Other art works were handed over to the Musei Civici di Modena.

Giuseppe Campori's bibliography includes over two hundred publications, as pamphlets, monographs and other published contributions.
