= Accademia di Belle Arti di Carrara =

Arts school in Carrara, Italy

- Accademia di belle arti di Carrara
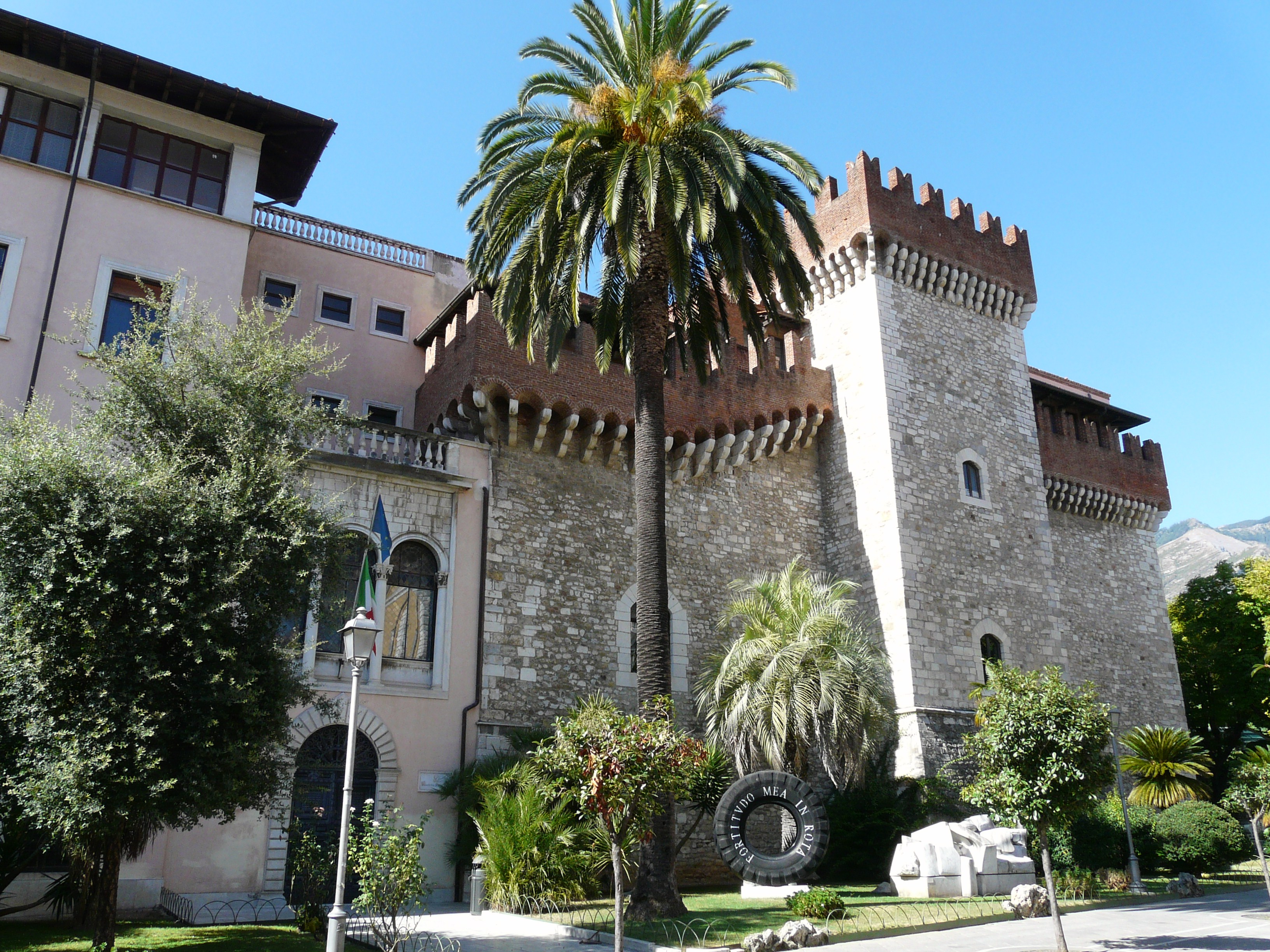
- Palazzo Cybo-Malaspina, which houses the accademia
- Type: academy of art
- Established: 26 September 1769
- Director: Luciano Massari
- Location: Carrara, Massa-Carrara, Tuscany, Italy; 44.0782°N 10.0992°E
- Campus: Via Roma 1, 54033 Carrara (MS)
- Website: www.accademiacarrara.it

The Accademia di Belle Arti di Carrara is a public tertiary academy of art in Carrara, in Tuscany in central Italy. It was founded on 26 September 1769 by Maria Teresa Cybo-Malaspina, duchess of Massa and princess of Carrara; but its origins go back to 1757, when, on the advice of the sculptor Giovanni Domenico Olivieri, she founded the Accademia di San Ceccardo in which sculpture, architecture and painting were to be taught. To house it, she commissioned Filippo del Medico to design and build a new building (which is now the Biblioteca Civica); in 1807, by order of Elisa Bonaparte Baciocchi, the accademia was moved to the Palazzo Cybo Malaspina. The school of architecture was at first under Filippo del Medico; Giovanni Antonio Cybei was head of the school of sculpture.

Like other state art academies in Italy, it became an autonomous degree-awarding institution under law no. 508 dated 21 December 1999, and falls under the Ministero dell'Istruzione, dell'Universita e della Ricerca, the Italian ministry of education and research.
