= National Vietnam Veterans Museum =

Coordinates: 38.5207°S 145.3245°E

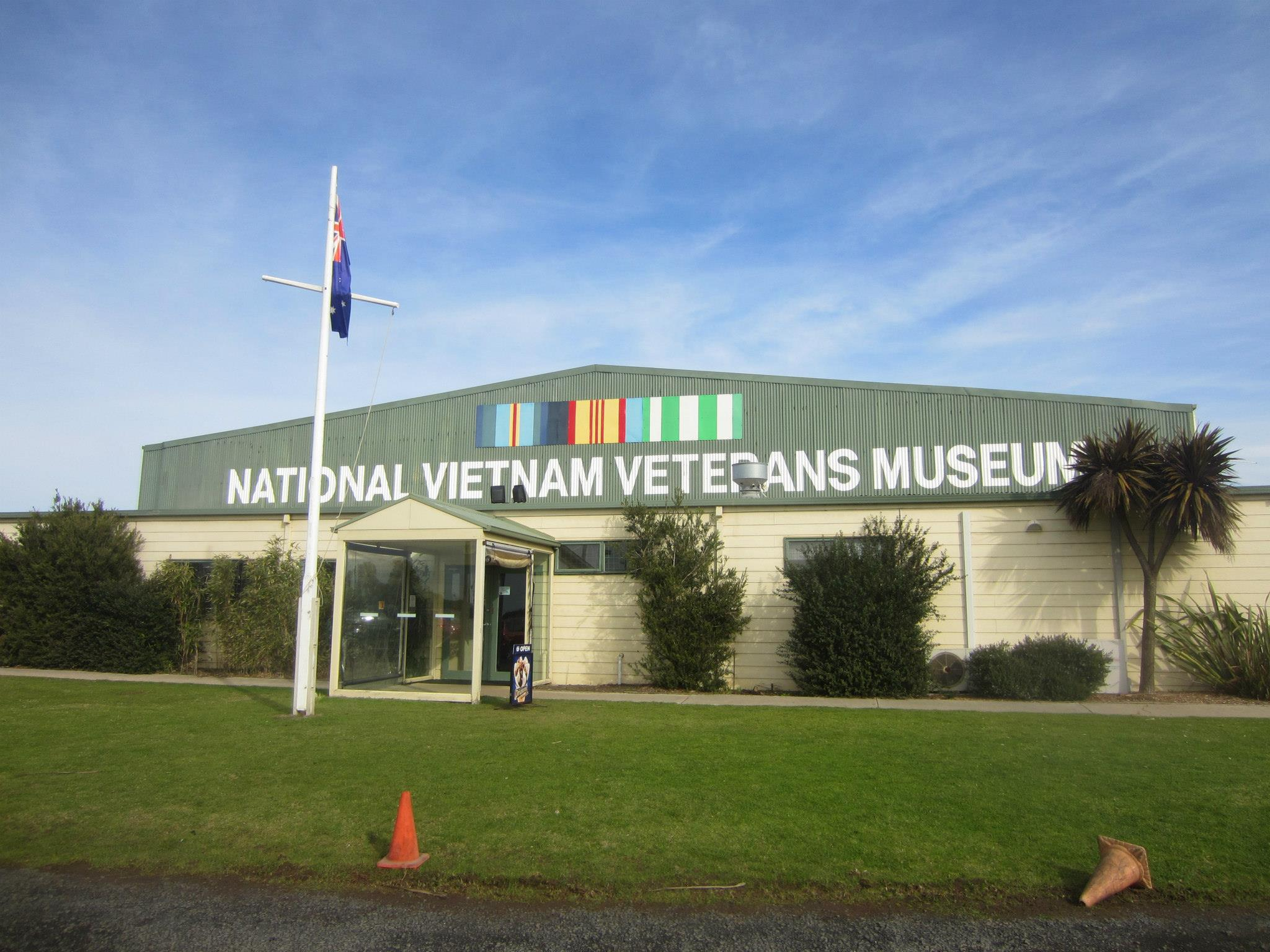
- Established: 1996
- Location: 25 Veterans Drive, Newhaven, Victoria, Australia
- Type: Veterans Museum
- Website: https://www.vietnamvetsmuseum.org/

The National Vietnam Veterans Museum (NVVM) is located in the suburb of Newhaven on Phillip Island, Victoria. It is an Australian war museum established by Vietnam War veterans to commemorate their service and to educate the public. From humble beginnings in the 1990s, it has grown into a prominent institution dedicated to preserving and honouring the legacy of Australia’s Vietnam War veterans. Each year on the 18th August, the museum commemorates Vietnam Veterans Remembrance Day in Australia, which also marks the anniversary of the Battle of Long Tan.

Beyond numbers, the cultural impact of the museum is profound for Australia. It stands as the country’s dedicated centre for remembering the Vietnam War experience, separate from but complementing larger institutions like the Australian War Memorial. It is regarded as possibly the largest museum in the world dedicated specifically to the Vietnam War, larger even than counterparts in the United States. This distinction underscores how significant this museum is in curating the memory of the war.

== Collection ==
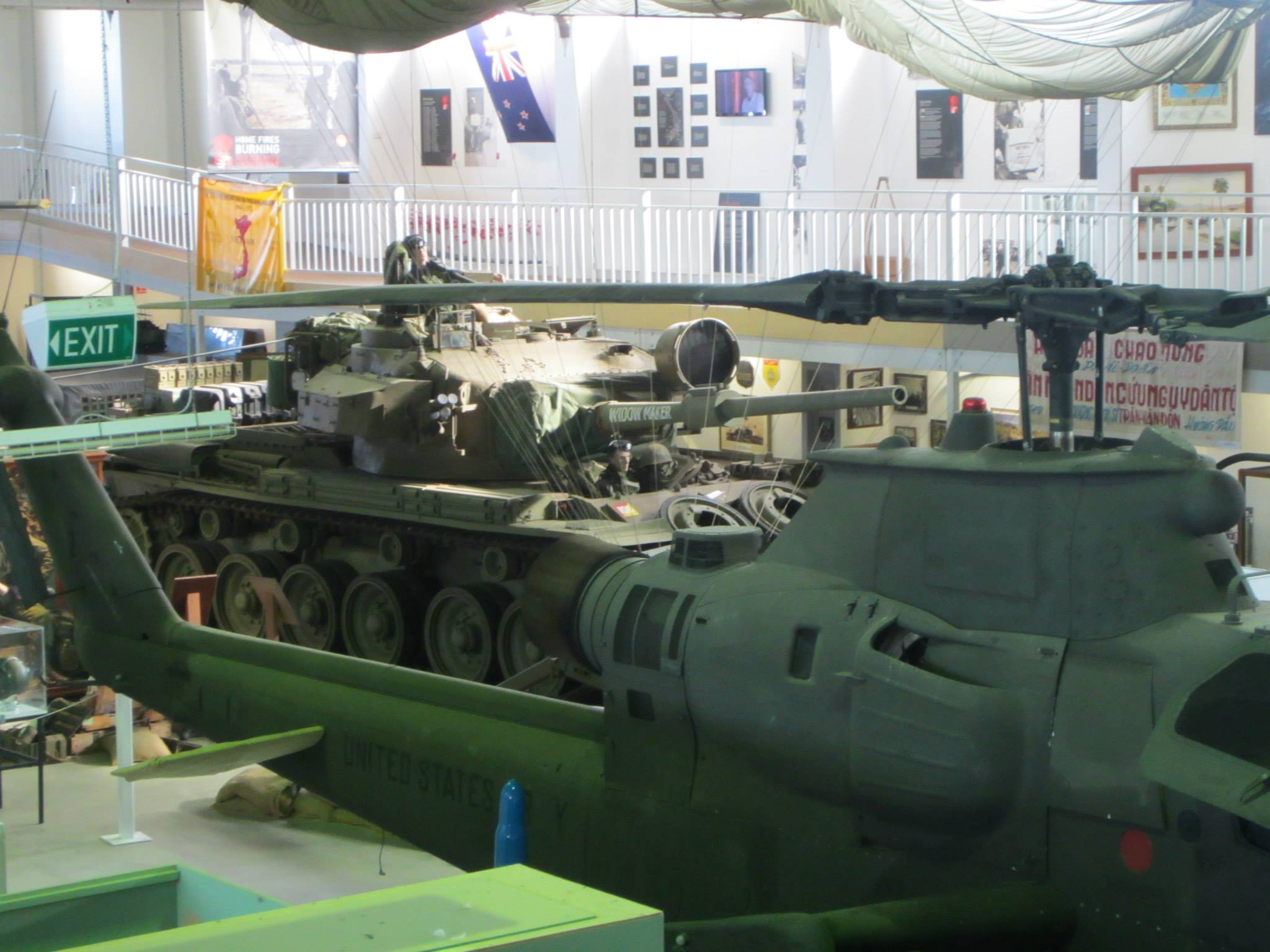
The Centurion tank and AH-1 helicopter in the museum's collection

The museum contains a large collection of items and vehicles, including a Centurion tank, a Mark V International Harvester truck, and a 105mm pack howitzer. It also has a collection of aircraft from the era of the Vietnam war, including a de Havilland Canada DHC-4 Caribou transport plane, an English Electric Canberra bomber, a Westland Wessex helicopter, a Bell AH-1 Cobra helicopter gunship, Bell UH-1 Iroquois helicopter, a Bell H-13 Sioux helicopter and a Grumman S-2 Tracker anti-submarine warfare aircraft.

== History ==
=== Founding and Origins ===
The chief founder was Vietnam veteran John Methven OAM, with the support of his wife. In 1996, John and Krishna Methven embarked on a six-week journey around Australia, towing a trailer full of John’s Vietnam War memorabilia as a mobile museum. This travelling exhibit aimed to reach out to veterans and to let them know about the Vietnam Veterans Association of Australia (VVAA), which was lobbying for proper recognition and support for Vietnam vets. Following the success of the mobile museum tour, the Methvens settled in the Phillip Island area. In March 1998, a makeshift museum was set up in a garage at their San Remo home. This was the first Vietnam Veterans Museum open to the public. The small garage display struck a chord, and more veterans began donating their memorabilia, photos, and stories to the collection. This grassroots effort in the late 1990s established the core of the museum and demonstrated the strong desire among veterans to have a dedicated place to remember and to share their experiences.

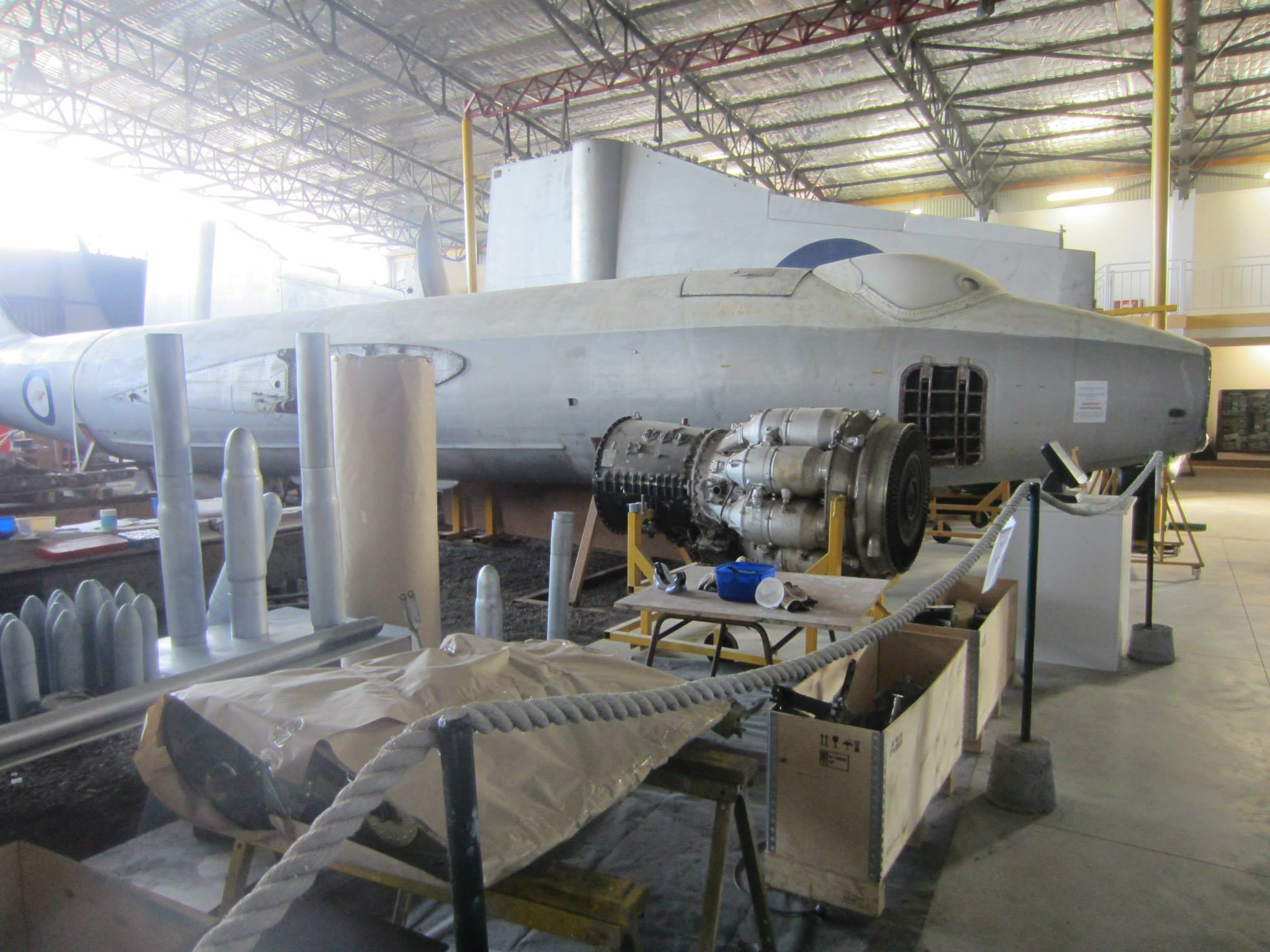
The English Electric Canberra under restoration at the museum in 2013

A permanent and much larger site opened in 2007 near the Phillip Island Airport. The museum has also expanded its physical infrastructure with a second aircraft hangar being erected to house the growing number of large exhibits. Workshop facilities were also set up where volunteers began restoring vintage military vehicles and aircraft.

=== Today ===
Today, the National Vietnam Veterans Museum is an institution of national cultural importance. It draws tens of thousands of visitors each year and in recent years, interest in the museum has been surging. Its presence not only preserves valuable history, but also contributes to the regional Victorian economy by attracting visitors year-round, and complementing other attractions like the Penguin Parade and Grand Prix Circuit. Up to date admission prices for the museum can be found on their website. Admission for all veterans is free.
