= Summerland Peninsula =

Protected area in Victoria, Australia

- IUCN category III (natural monument or feature)
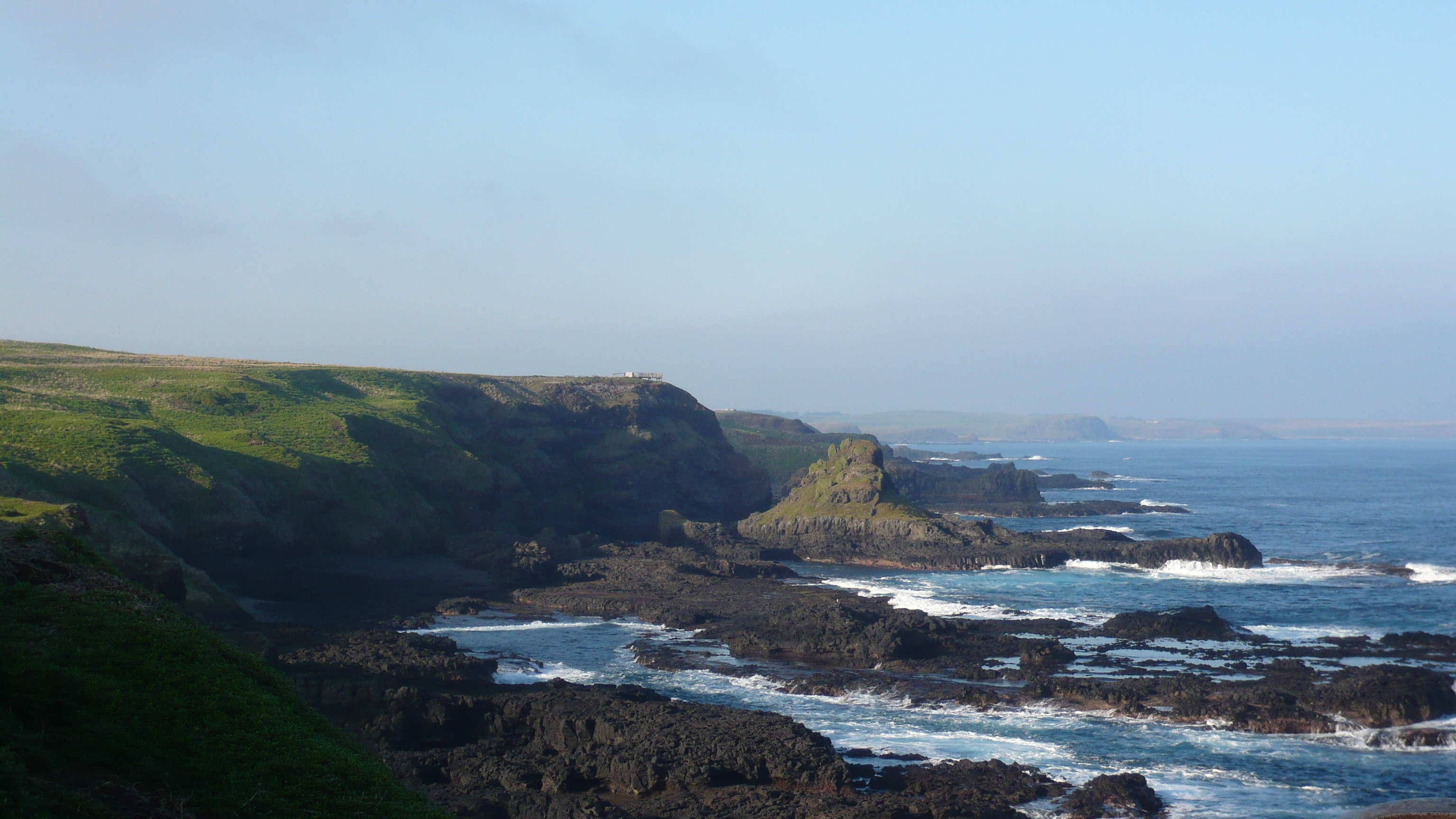
- Summerland Peninsula, Philip Island, Australia

- Location within Victoria
- Location: Victoria
- Coordinates: 38°30′36″S 145°7′48″E

The Summerland Peninsula is located at the western end of Phillip Island in Victoria, Australia. The peninsula lies within the Gippsland Plain Bioregion and is a site of high conservation significance.

As part of a protected area the peninsula supports a diverse array of animal and plant life, including a number of species listed as of conservation concern by international, federal and state bodies including the International Union for the Conservation of Nature, Environment Protection and Biodiversity Conservation Act 1999 (EPBC Act), the Flora and Fauna Guarantee Act 1988 (FFG Act) and it is a BirdLife International Important Bird Area. It is home to one of the largest little penguin (Eudyptula minor) breeding colonies in Australia, the second largest breeding colony of Australian fur seals (Arctocephalus pusillus doriferus) in the world, one of the largest breeding colonies of greater crested terns (Sterna bergii) in Victoria and an important breeding ground for short-tailed shearwaters (Puffinus tenuirostris). Several plants regarded as rare or threatened in either Victoria or Australia have been recorded on the peninsula, including river swamp wallaby-grass (Amphibromus fluitans) listed as vulnerable in Australia.

The peninsula was significantly modified by agricultural, residential and recreational developments until the 1980s causing overall ecosystem degradation, however protection, management and restoration efforts over the past 30 years has seen the area's biodiversity recover. Today Phillip Island Nature Parks (PINP) manage the peninsula as an area of ecological significance under the Crown Land Reserves Act 1978. The peninsula is also home to two major state tourism assets managed by PINP, the Penguin Parade and the Nobbies Centre, which receive over 600,000 visitors annually. As a not-for-profit organisation operating revenue from these eco-tourism activities fund conservation work across PINP managed land.

== Description ==
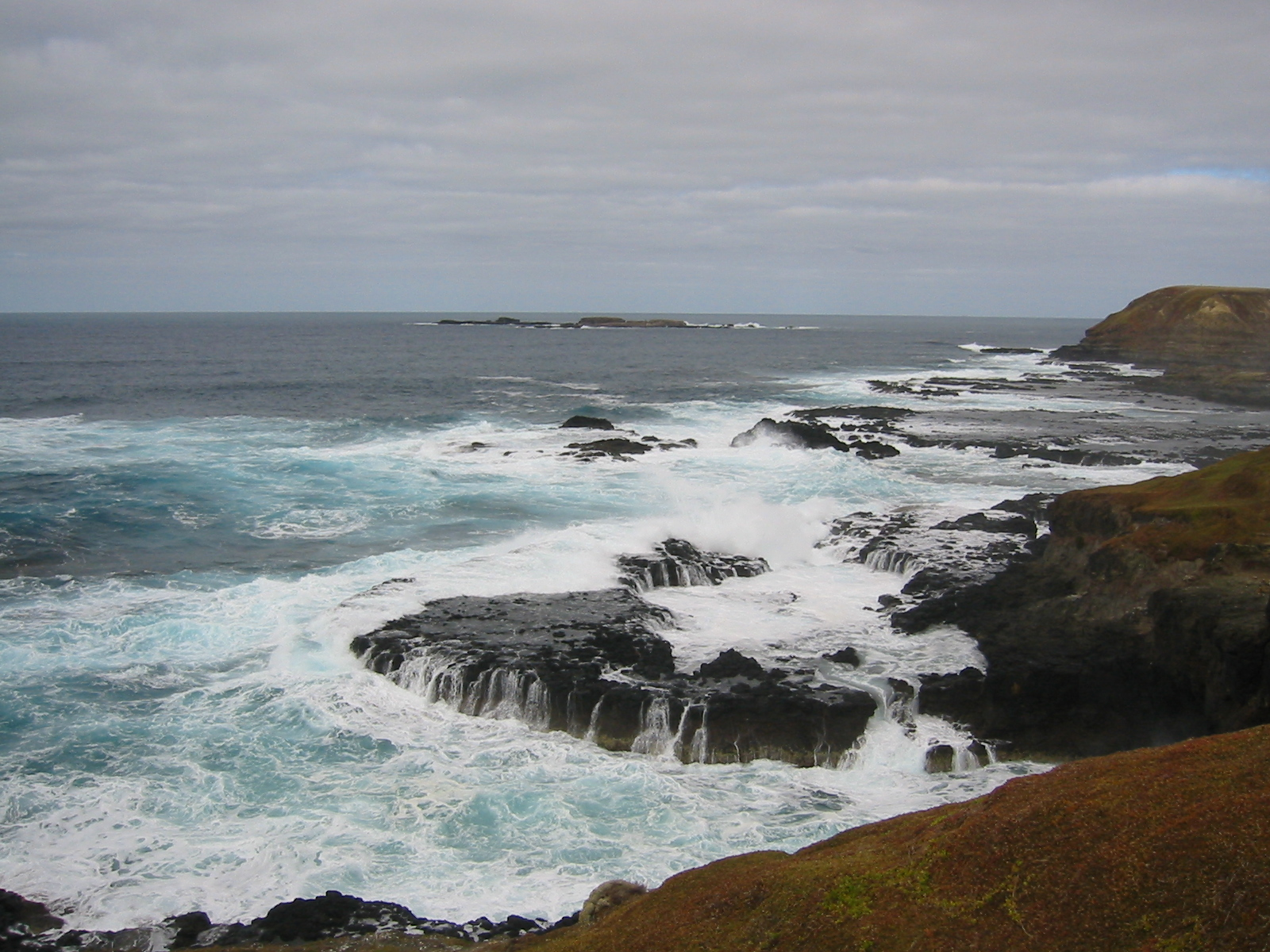
Seal Rocks (in distance), Phillip Island, Australia

The Summerland Peninsula is approximately 360 ha (890 acres) in area and is an exposed coastal plateau surrounded by coastlines of sandy and basalt boulder beaches and rock platforms among rocky basalt cliffs. Other major landforms include a coastal dune system and wetlands, made up of a freshwater lagoon, Swan Lake, and swamp, Green Lake. The north coast of the peninsula faces into the calm waters of Western Port Bay and the south coast into the more turbid waters of Bass Strait. The area includes the offshore rock formations of the Nobbies, three small islands, and Seal Rocks (Seal Rock and Black Rock) two rocky islets of 8 hectares, about 1.5 km off the western tip of the peninsula in Bass Strait.

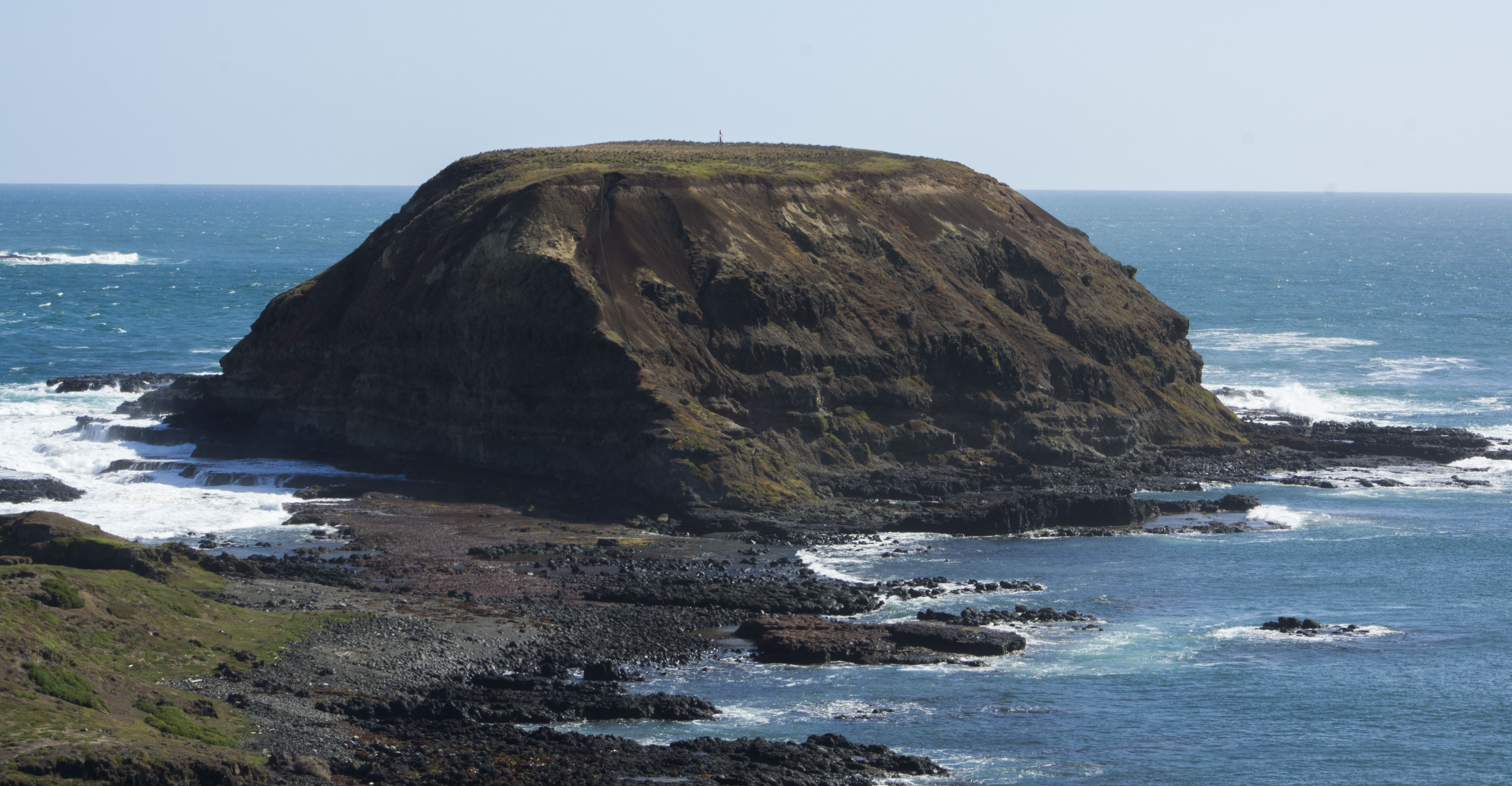
The Nobbies, Phillip Island

The area has a temperate climate, with cool wet winters (June – August) and hot and dry summers (December – February). The majority of rainfall occurs in winter, with between 500mm and 1100mm per year, and the area is exposed to the full force of southwest gales.

Vegetation communities are determined by wind exposure, salt-spray, soil composition, geology, presence of seabird colonies and past land management practices. Ecological vegetation classes on the plateau include Grassy Woodland and Coastal Tussock Grassland; the steep, exposed coastal cliffs of the peninsula consist of Coastal Tussock Grassland and Coastal Dune Scrub, and extensive areas of bird colony Succulent Herbland are found on the southern cliff faces and cliff tops among little penguin and short-tailed shearwater colonies, including the Nobbies.

== History ==
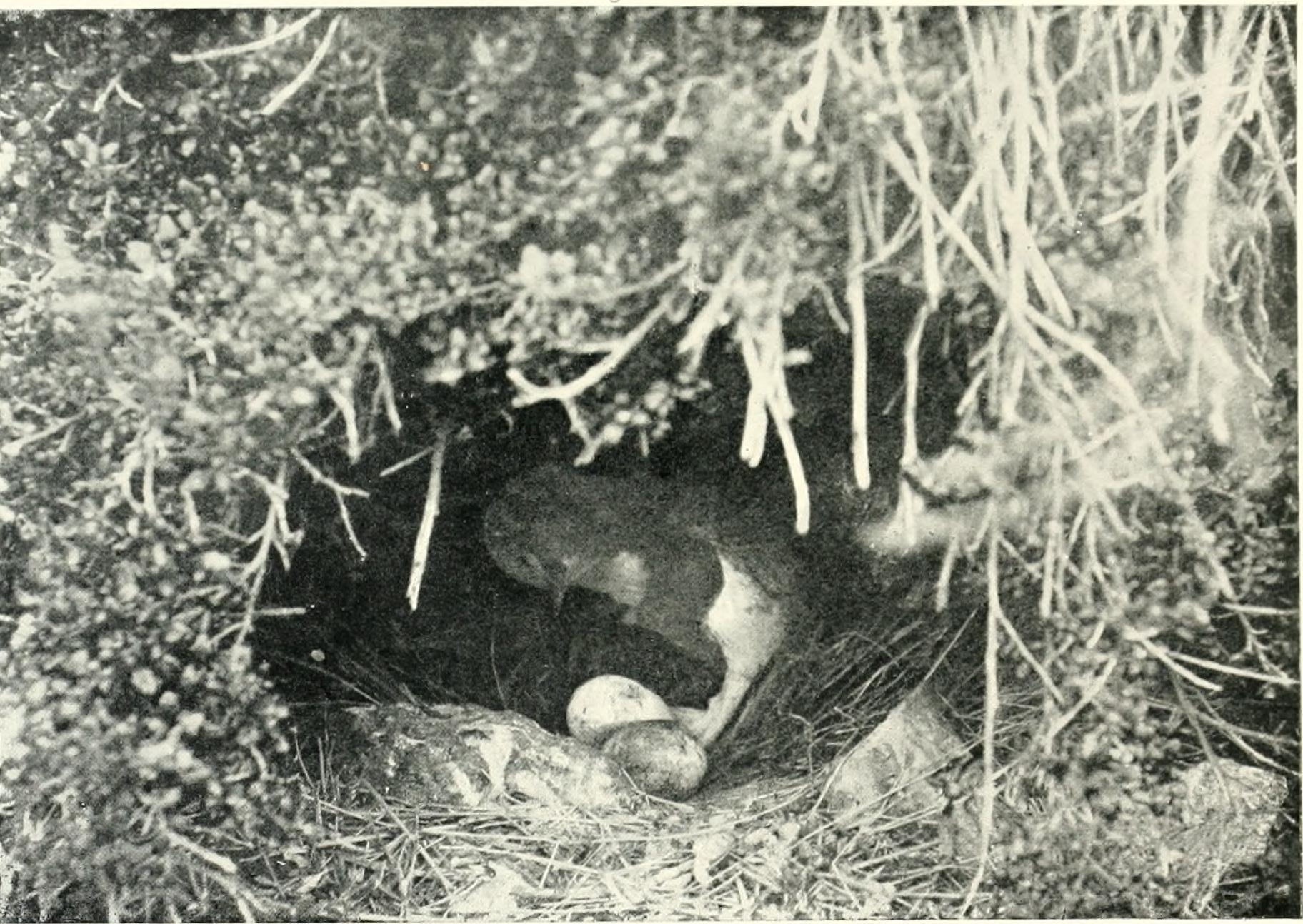
Little penguin burrow, early 1900s, Phillip Island

Modification of Phillip Island and its Summerland Peninsula began after European Settlement in the 1830s and 1840s. In 1839 the entire island (approximately 10,000 hectares) was cleared by burning to make way for agriculture, by 1872 farmers had settled the peninsula cultivating chicory and bringing cattle and rabbits which further decimated the land. Residential developments and recreational activities soon followed in the 1900s.

=== Tourism ===
In the late 1920s tourism became an established business in the area after three locals began taking tourists to view the nightly "penguin parade", where little penguins arrive ashore at Summerland Beach and head to their burrows and rock cavities on the peninsula to rest, breed, feed chicks and moult. By the late 1980s the Penguin Parade was recognised as one of the most popular attractions in Victoria with 500,000 visitors annually.

=== Summerland Estate ===
Between 1920 and 1961, the peninsula was subdivided into 776 residential allotments. Further buildings and infrastructure were erected within the penguin colony and the area became known as the Summerland Estate. As human activity grew so did introduced threats such as invasive weeds, red foxes (Vulpes vulpes) and traffic which was negatively impacting biodiversity. Slowly the importance of protecting the area's natural values for the benefit of both wildlife and tourism were recognised and a large penguin reserve was established by the government. Scientific research into little penguin breeding and survival on the peninsula only began in 1968 with the formation of the volunteer Penguin Study Group (PSG).

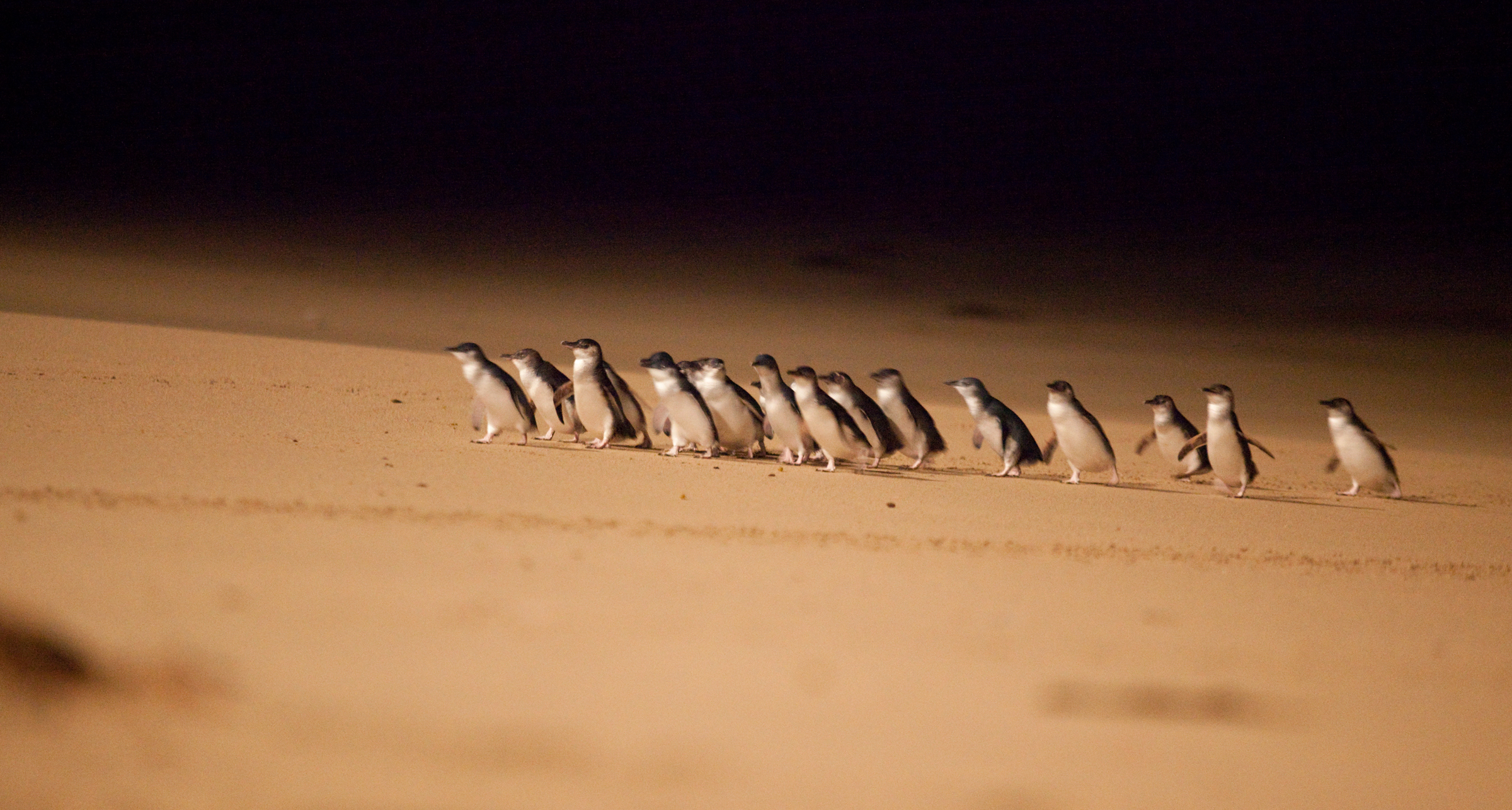
Penguin Parade, Summerland Beach

=== Little penguin population decline ===
Despite this new focus on conservation, studies by the PSG and a newly established Scientific Advisory Committee revealed the island's penguin population was in decline due to habitat destruction, introduced plants and animals, road traffic and disturbance in the penguin colony, however direct impacts from tourism were slight. Research indicated that introduced predators, namely foxes, were adversely effecting breeding success and adult survival, and that habitat reduction and destruction due to developments was significantly depressing the population. By the late 1970s nine out of Phillip Island's ten little penguin colonies were extinct with the last colony restricted to the Summerland Peninsula. Ecological modelling estimated that if threats were not managed the Summerland Peninsula penguin colony would also be extinct by 1998-99 and the Penguin Parade cease to be a viable tourist attraction.

=== Preventing little penguin extinction ===
In 1985, presented with these research findings, the Victoria State Government accepted the need for urgent action to assist, and with the then Penguin Reserve Committee of Management developed the Penguin Protection Plan. Under this plan, the government instituted a buy-back program for all infrastructure on the Summerland Peninsula and allocated funds for substantial further scientific research into better understanding penguins on land and their lives at sea.

Penguin Parade viewing stands, Summerland Peninsula

In the late 1980s, revegetation of penguin habitat and installation of artificial nesting boxes had been initiated, as well as improved control of tourists and vehicles. While some fox control was in place, improved strategies were imperative to reduce the mortality of predator-killed penguins of which 56% of deaths were attributed to foxes between 1986 and 1989. Control of visitors to the Penguin Parade was improved with the installation of boardwalks and stands to prevent trampling through the colony and allowing only 10% of the penguin population to be viewed by the public for 1–2 hours after dusk.

=== Restoration ===
In 2010 the Summerland Peninsula buy-back was completed and in 2011 a subsequent Summerland Restoration Project initiated with a $3.4 million grant from the State Government of Victoria. The program included under-grounding power, demolition and removal of the last remaining houses and redundant infrastructure, revegetation and the provision of artificial nests and pest and predator control.

These extensive conservation efforts have helped the little penguin population on the Summerland Peninsula grow from an estimated 12,000 birds in the 1980s headed for extinction to an estimated 31,000 breeding individuals in 2014.

As of 2023 the Summerland Estate's population of little penguins was estimated at 40,000. After many penguins had died in a 2019 heatwave, native plants such as bower spinach were planted around penguin boxes to insulate them. Grass fires, largely due to poor practices since settlement, and projected to occur more frequently as a result of climate change, threaten the penguins' habitat, and it has been observed that they do not move away from fire. A project is under way to replace more flammable introduced plants with less flammable endemic species, creating natural firebreaks.

== Flora ==
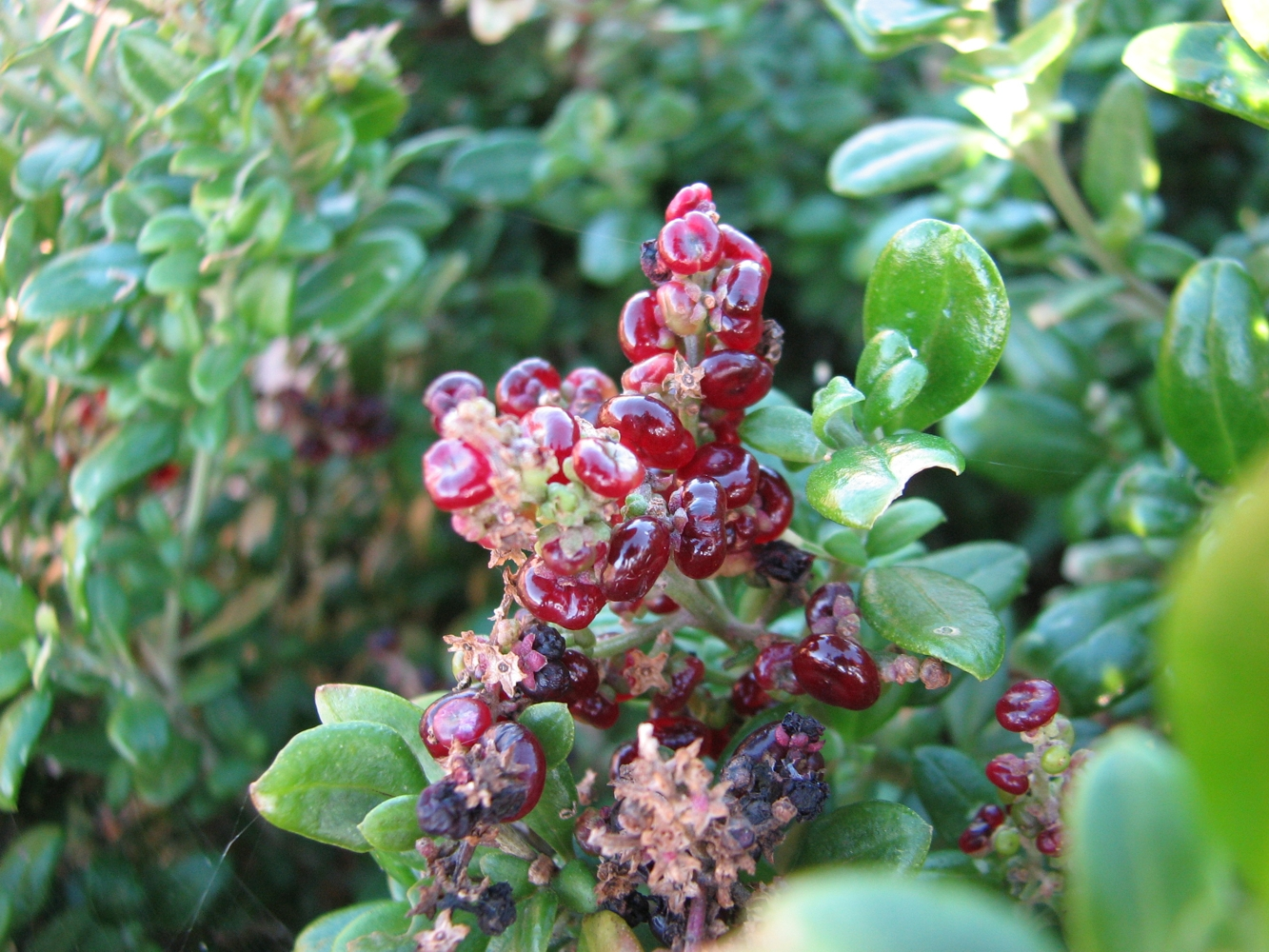
Seaberry saltbush (Rhagodia candolleana)

The peninsula supports a variety of ecological vegetation communities which are of conservation concern within the Gippsland Plains Bioregion. These include grassy woodland (endangered), bird colony succulent herbland (rare), estuarine flats grassland (endangered), coastal tussock grassland (vulnerable) and coastal dune scrub (depleted). Overall vegetation of the Summerland Peninsula is dominated by coast tussock-grass (Poa poiformis), bower spinach (Tetragonia implexicoma), seaberry saltbush (Rhagodia candolleana), rounded noon-flower (Disphyma crassifolium subsp. davellatum) and coastal tea-tree (Leptospermum laevigatum).

Several species of plant found on the peninsula are listed as either rare or threatened in Victoria or Australia, including river swamp wallaby-grass (Amphibromus fluitans) listed as vulnerable in Australia, purple blown-grass (Lachnagrostis punicea subsp. filifolia) listed as vulnerable in Victoria, and pale-flower cranesbill (Geranium sp. 3), Creeping Rush (Juncus revolutus), Dune Wood-sorrel (Oxalis rubens) and Dune Poa (Poa poiformis var. ramifer) all listed as rare in Victoria.

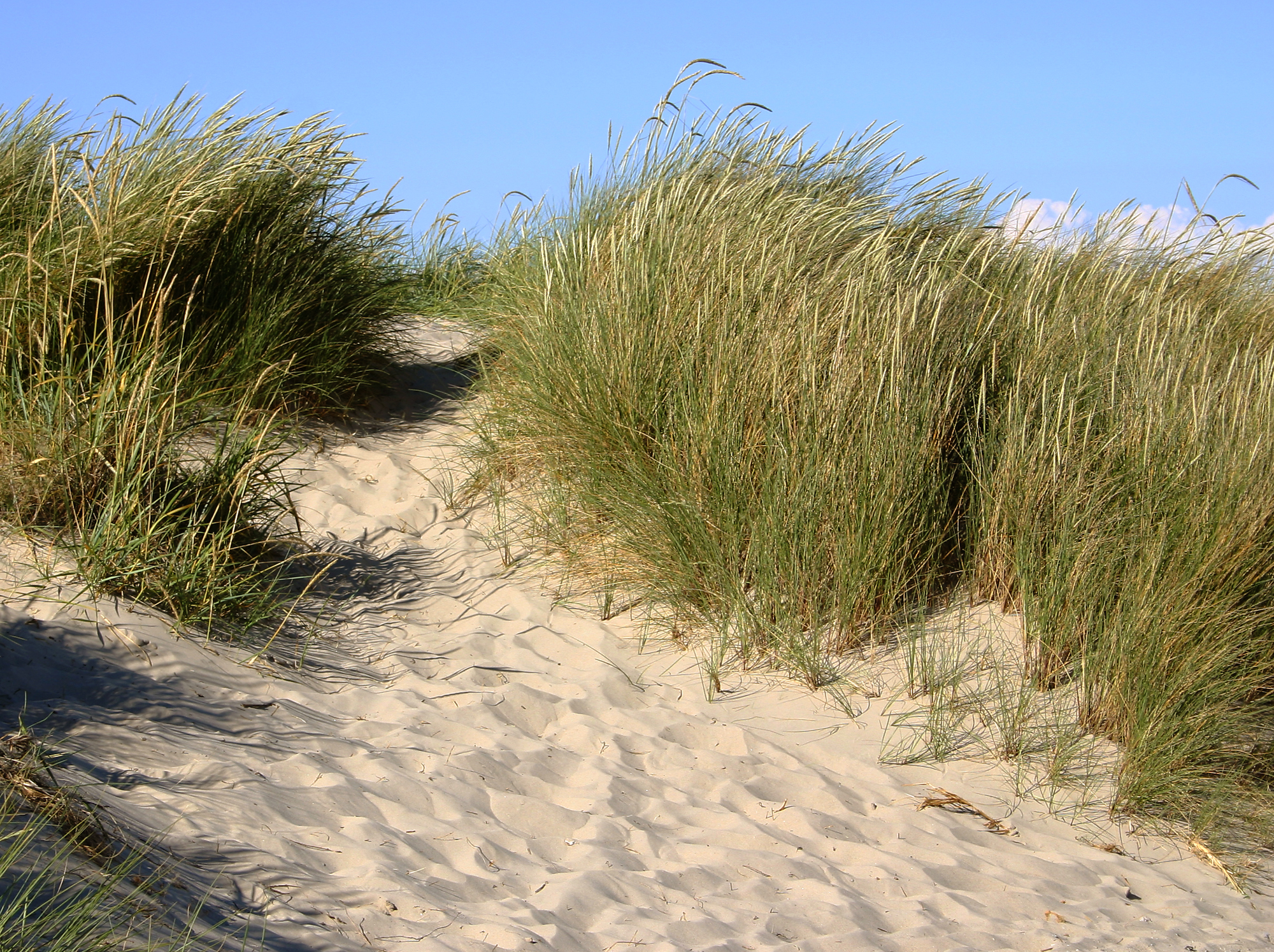
Marram grass (Ammophila arenaria)

Pest plants and weeds are a significant threat on the peninsula, impacting wildlife and habitat as well as threatened plant species and vegetation communities. African boxthorn (Lycium ferocissimum), gorse (Ulex europaeus), kikuyu grass (Pennisetum clandestinum) and Melaleuca species have been given priority for management as they threaten seabird habitat and provide shelter for feral cats and foxes. Introduced species such as marram grass (Ammophila arenaria) and sea wheat-grass (Thinopyrum junceiforme) have become well-established in many areas affecting dune development and morphology.

Intensive revegetation and weed control work continues on the peninsula with the aim of restoring it nearer to the pre-European settlement environment, in 2015 over 2,500 plants were planted with works focused on Allocasuarina shrubs to assist in slowing the spread of Melaleuca.

== Fauna ==
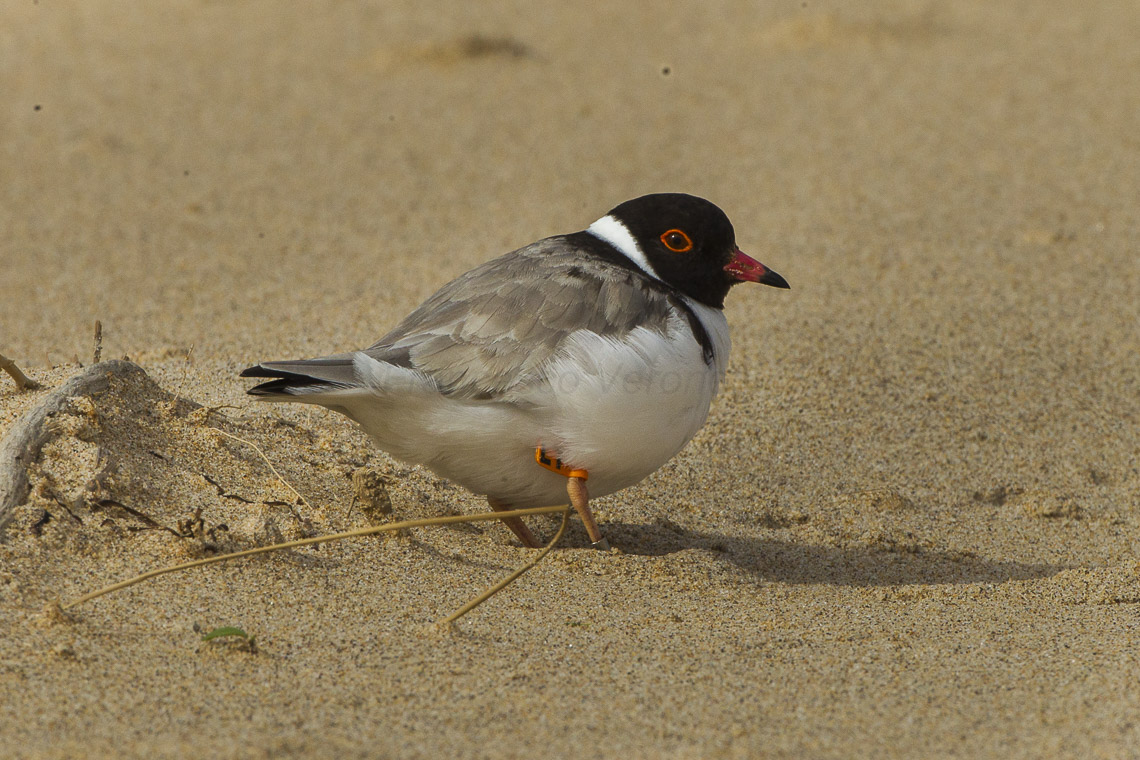
Hooded plover (Thinornis cucullatus), Phillip Island Australia

The protection of the peninsula provides critical breeding and non-breeding habitat for a diverse range of wildlife including native and migratory birds, mammals, amphibians and reptiles a number of which are listed as of conservation concern by international, federal and state bodies and treaties including the Japan-Australia Migratory Bird Agreement. Lack of native ground-dwelling predators and rich local marine resources provide plentiful resources for seabirds to breed. The area is recognised as a priority conservation area by BirdLife International with globally significant bird populations of little penguins, short-tailed shearwaters and Pacific gulls (Larus pacificus pacificus) also listed as vulnerable in Victoria. IUCN listed species include the fairy tern (Sternula nereis) listed as vulnerable, hooded plover (Thinornis cucullatus) listed as vulnerable and the visiting shy albatross (Thalassarche cauta) listed as near threatened. Other seabird species include the kelp gull (Larus dominicanus), sooty oystercatcher (Haematopus fuliginosus) and the pied oystercatcher (Haematopus longirostris).

The peninsula also supports the black swamp wallaby (Wallabia bicolor), Cape Barren goose (Cereopsis novaehollandiae), short-beaked echidna (Tachyglossus aculeatus), copperhead snake (Austrelaps superbus), blotched blue-tongued lizard (Tiliqua nigrolutea) and the threatened growling grass frog (Litoria raniformis) found at Swan Lake. Surrounding waters are a feeding area for the great white shark (Carcharodon carcharias) listed as vulnerable in Australia under the EPBC Act.

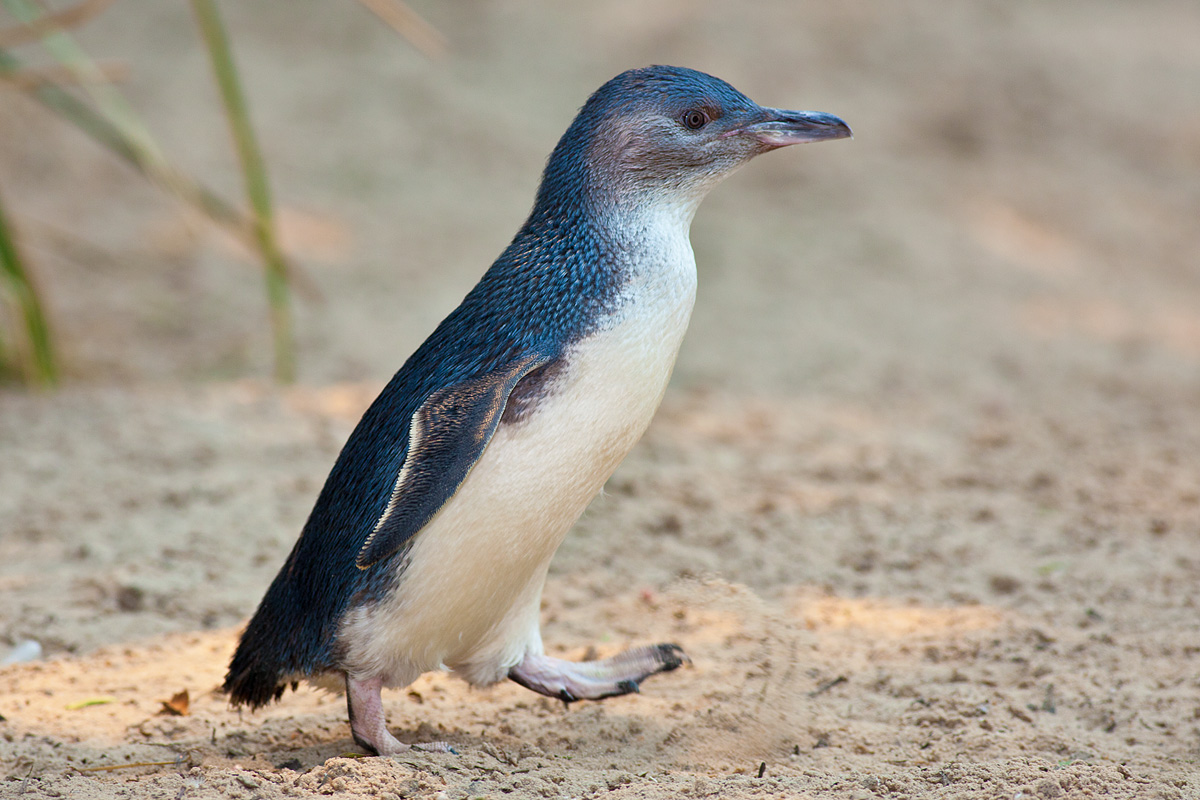
Little penguin (Eudyptula minor)

=== Little penguin ===
The little penguin colony on the Summerland Peninsula is one of the largest breeding colonies in Australia, with the current population size estimated to be 31,000 breeding individuals, of which 10% are located within the Penguin Parade area. Extensive conservation work has prevented a population decline and predicted extinction of this colony over the past 30 years.

Scientific research into little penguins has been ongoing in the area for 48 years, monitoring the colony both on land and at sea to better understand threats to population and breeding. Threats at sea include disease, impacts to food supply as well as climate change. In 1995 a previously unknown Herpes virus infected millions of pilchards (Sardinops sagax) across Australia, at the same time increases in little penguin moralities were reported across western Victoria and numbers crossing the Summerland Beach declined. Scientists found that these penguins had died from starvation and gastro-intestinal parasitism due to the mass mortality of one of their main food species, which also impacted penguin breeding success the following season. Further research into little penguin diets continues to better understand the impact of prey mortalities on their biology and foraging ecology.

=== short-tailed shearwater ===
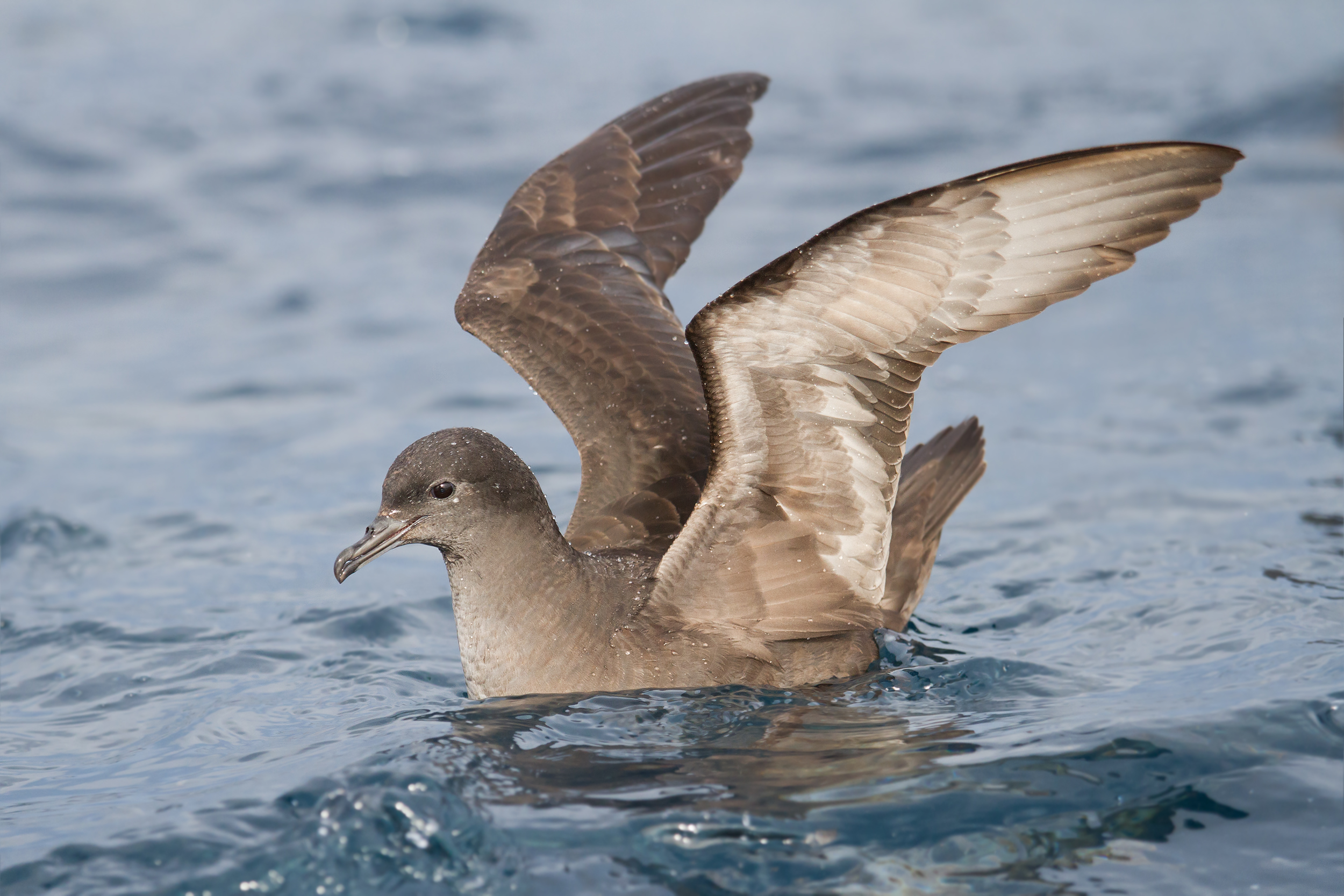
Short-tailed shearwater (Puffinus tenuirostris)

Approximately one million short-tailed shearwaters (commonly known as mutton birds in Australia) return to Phillip Island from the Bering Straits, Alaska to breed in burrows each year. Historically, shearwaters were harvested for food and oil but are now protected in Victoria. The threat of fox predation on the colony has been largely reduced due to control and eradication, however township light pollution and the ingestion of marine plastic waste remain significant threats of which scientists are currently researching. Fledglings on their first flights to sea are attracted to artificial lights which disorientates their path and leaves many landing and stranded on roads. High mortality rates from road traffic were recorded until 1999, before a Shearwater Protection Program was established to remove and re-locate birds on roads to safer areas. A recent study on Phillip Island into plastic ingestion in shearwater fledglings found all sampled birds contained plastic particles, passed on from the fish caught by their parents, it has been found that shearwaters have a particularly high prevalence of marine debris in their systems.

=== Australian fur seal ===
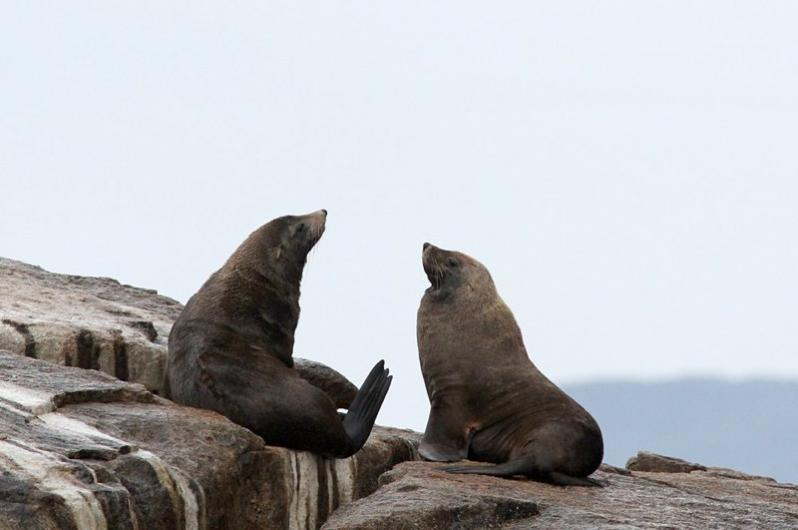
Australian fur seal (Arctocephalus pusillus doriferus)

The protection of Seal Rocks as a significant Australian fur seal breeding and nursery site, national and state protection of all seals in Australian waters from 1975 and dedicated scientific research has helped the population slowly recover from the effects of commercial sealing in the late 1790s – 1900s and subsequent culls by fisheries. Today, Seal Rocks supports an estimated 30,000 individuals. Marine debris has been identified as a threat to the colony, with recent research estimating 302 entanglements occurring per year on Seal Rocks with pups and juveniles most at risk due to their inquisitive and playful nature. Understanding the effects of marine debris on the population can establish more effective management of both debris sources as well as the wildlife that interacts with it.

== Major threats to biodiversity ==
Current major threats to the biodiversity of the Summerland Peninsula include predation and competition from introduced species such as foxes, feral cats (Felis catus), rabbits (Oryctolagus cuniculus) and black rats (Rattus rattus) as well as loss and degradation of native plant and animal habitat from invasive pest plants, climate change, disease, impacts to food supply, fire, oil spills and general human disturbance.

Introduced predators, in particular foxes, are a significant threat to the ground-nesting colonial seabirds and shorebirds of the Summerland Peninsula. Foxes were introduced to Phillip Island in 1907 and while various control methods have been implemented since 1918 none were successful. Fox monitoring and control is difficult as foxes have high breeding productivity, are wary of humans, highly mobile, ecologically adaptable and their 'surplus kill' hunting behaviour can kill up to 30 penguins a night. In 2007 PINP established a dedicated fox eradication program with the aim of removing all foxes from Phillip Island and as a result there has been a decline in penguin moralities by foxes on the peninsula from 125 killed in 2007/2008 to five killed in the subsequent four years. In 2012 there was an estimated 11 foxes remaining across the whole of Phillip Island, if the program is successful Phillip Island will be the largest island from which red foxes have been eradicated.

The peninsula's disturbed landscape makes it particularly susceptible to weed infestations which threaten wildlife and habitat, threatened plant species and ecological vegetation classes as well as other areas of vegetation, in addition the introduction of soil pathogens and fungi pose further threats to habitat and wildlife. PINP works with community and other stakeholders on strategic weed management and prevention of further infestation, as well as funding scientific research into the ecology and dispersal of invasive species to help improve efficiency of weed control programs.

PINP is responsible to undertake all possible measures to prevent and minimise the dangers the spread of fires for the protection of both the public, visitors, and wildlife under the Country Fire Authority Act 1958. In addition, PINP along with state government have response plans in place to manage the threat of oil spills on wildlife and the environment.

== Management ==
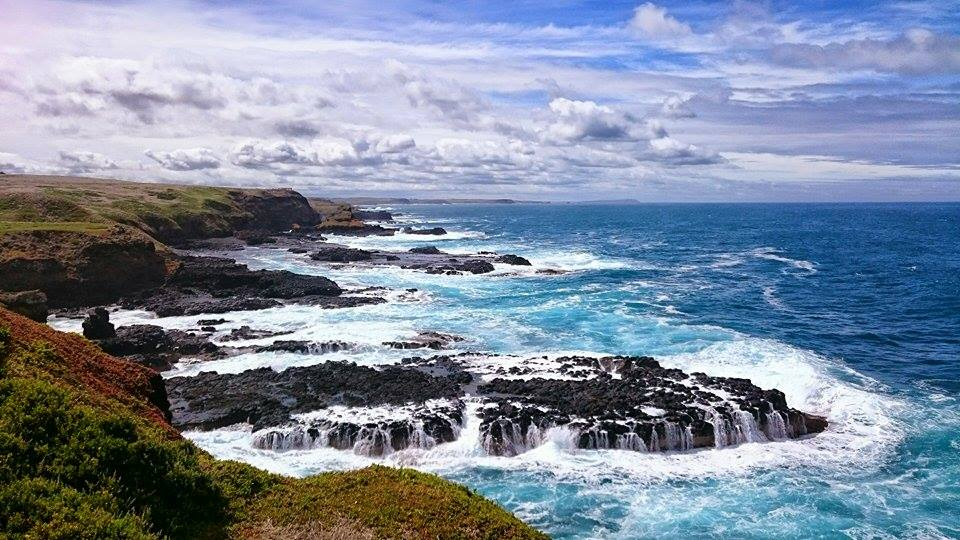
Summerland Peninsula, Phillip Island, Australia

The Summerland Peninsula is managed by Phillip Island Nature Parks, created in 1996 by the State Government of Victoria to protect 1805 hectares of Crown Land under the Crown Land (Reserves) Act 1978 "for the conservation of areas of natural interest or beauty or of scientific, historic or archaeological interest". PINP is a not-for-profit organisation and is overseen by a Board of Management appointed by the Victorian Minister for Environment, Climate Change and Water. PINP reports to the Department of Environment, Land, Water and Planning (DELWP). Phillip Island is part of Bunurong country, of which PINP acknowledges their custodianship of Phillip Island and surrounds. PINP manage four main visitor attractions across Phillip Island including Penguin Parade, Nobbies Centre, Koala Conservation Centre and Churchill Island. PINP's role in wildlife and environment conservation includes "seeking to understand more about the needs of native species, identifying management practices to optimise the size and spread of populations, and monitoring changes in populations and habitats" through scientific research and dedicated environmental management.

PINP continues to prioritise the restoration of the Summerland Peninsula, developing a Summerland Peninsula Special Management Area and Summerland Peninsula Master Plan. In April 2016, the State Government of Victoria awarded $48 million to upgrade PINP's out-dated Penguin Parade facilities built in 1988 to a better equipped centre with a smaller environmental footprint which will also allow the restoration of eight hectares of critical habitat back for the penguins.
