= Phillip Island Important Bird Area =

Important Bird Area in Victoria, Australia

Coordinates: 38°31′11″S 145°12′46″E

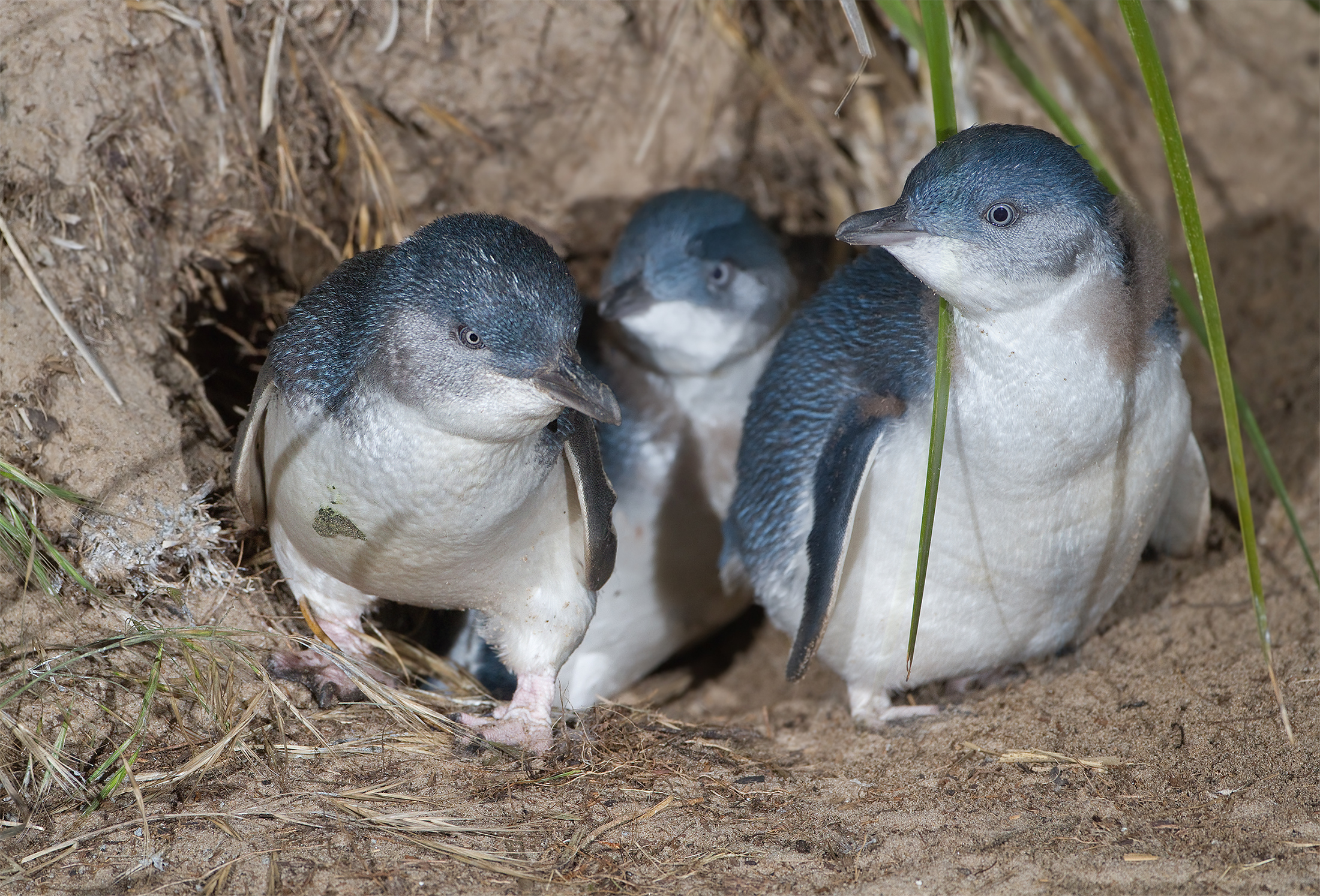
The IBA is an important site for little penguins

The Phillip Island Important Bird Area comprises a 20 km^{2} strip of coastline along the south and west coasts of Phillip Island, Victoria, in south-eastern Australia.

== Description ==
The site contains much of the Phillip Island Nature Park, including the tourist attraction of Penguin Parade, the headland of Cape Woolamai, sandy beaches, coastal vegetation of herbland, grassland and shrubland, and the offshore islets and reefs of the Nobbies and Seal Rocks at the western end of the island. It does not include the intertidal mudflats of the island's north-eastern coast, which are part of the Western Port Important Bird Area.

== Birds ==
The site has been identified by BirdLife International as an Important Bird Area (IBA) because it supports over 1% of the world populations of little penguins (with up to 26,000 birds), short-tailed shearwaters (up to 450,000 pairs) and Pacific gulls (with an estimated 52-490 birds). In the past it was occasionally visited by small numbers of orange-bellied parrots. One of the largest breeding colonies of crested terns in Victoria (2800 pairs) is at the Nobbies. Pied and sooty oystercatchers, as well as hooded plovers, use the beaches.

=== Little penguin colony ===
The colony's population has fluctuated over time with changes in land use and tourism practises evolving. A 1918 count estimated 200,000 birds. By 1987 the population had plummeted to 20,000. In 1940, the population was believed to have dropped from approximately 2000 birds to 200 rapidly due to a disease or pathogen, though these figures are inconsistent with the scientific literature.

In 2011 the colony was estimated to contain up to 26,000 birds.

An early detailed account of a visit to the colony was written by Donald Macdonald and published in The Argus in 1902.

The high public profile of the colony has assisted conservation efforts; as has its economic value as a tourist attraction. In 1987, more international visitors witness the penguins coming ashore at Phillip Island than visited Uluru. In the financial year 1985-86, 350,000 people saw the event, and at that time audience numbers were growing 12% annually.

== Seals ==
Seal Rocks has the second largest colony in the world of Australian fur seals, with some 20,000-25,000 seals (25-30% of the global population) breeding or hauling-out there.
