= Seal Rocks (Victoria) =

Islands in Victoria, Australia

- Location within Victoria
- Etymology: fur seal (Grant, 1801)

Geography
- Location: Bass Strait
- Coordinates: 38°31′34″S 145°05′59″E
- Area: 2.8 ha (6.9 acres)
- Highest elevation: 12 m (39 ft)

Administration
- Australia
- State: Victoria

Demographics
- Population: 0

Seal Rocks consists of two small islets—Seal Rock and Black Rock—located 1.5 kilometres (0.9 miles) southwest of Phillip Island in Victoria, Australia at the western entrance to Western Port. They were named Seal Islands by James Grant in HMS Lady Nelson in January 1801.

Seal Rocks serves as a vital breeding ground for thousands of seals, alongside crested terns, silver gulls, and oyster catchers. Visitors can observe Seal Rocks from the Nobbies Centre. This ecotourism destination that is managed by Phillip Island Nature Park and also offers educational displays, a café, a children's play area, and a gift shop.

Before European colonisation, the Tasmanian fur seal thrived on Seal Rocks. However, from approximately 1801, sealers harvested around 1,000 skins annually, causing a sharp decline in the population. By 1860, only about one hundred seals remained. Protection measures were introduced in 1890, allowing numbers to recover gradually, reaching an estimated seasonal maximum of 5,000 today. The introduction of protection laws faced opposition from fishermen, who argued that seals damaged nets, reduced fish catches, and disrupted migratory shoals. Continued pressure from the fishing industry, coupled with a growing interest in marine ecology, led the Fisheries and Wildlife Department to establish a research station on Seal Rocks and research on seal behaviour and habits has continued ever since.

== Flora & fauna ==
In 1928, the Victorian government established a wildlife reserve at Seal Rocks, and seal hunting was banned in Victorian waters in 1975. The recovery of the Australian fur seal population has been gradual, and the islands now support a significant colony.

Today, Seal Rocks serves as a crucial breeding ground and nursery for approximately 20,000 Australian fur seals, accounting for around 25% of the total population. Each year, about 5,000 pups are born here, making up a quarter of the species' Australian population. At any given time, more than 5,000 seals can be found on Seal Rocks.
