= Phillip Island =

Island in Victoria, Australia

Native name: Corriong/Worne/Millowl
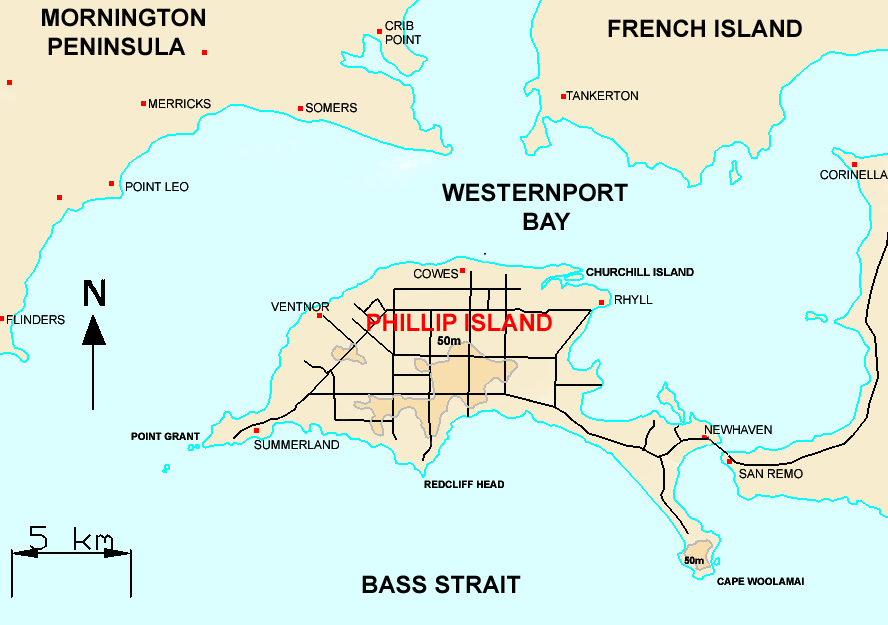
- Map of Phillip Island

- Location within Victoria

Geography
- Location: Western Port
- Coordinates: 38°29′S 145°14′E
- Area: 101 km^{2} (39 sq mi)
- Length: 26 km (16.2 mi)
- Width: 9 km (5.6 mi)
- Coastline: 97 km (60.3 mi)
- Highest elevation: 110 m (360 ft)

Administration
- Australia
- State: Victoria
- LGA: Bass Coast Shire
- Largest settlement: Cowes (pop. 6593)

Demographics
- Population: 13,799 (2021)
- Pop. density: 137.03/km^{2} (354.91/sq mi)

Phillip Island (Boonwurrung: Corriong, Worne or Millowl) is an Australian island about 125 km (78 mi) south-southeast of Melbourne, Victoria. The island is named after Governor Arthur Phillip, the first Governor of New South Wales, by explorer and seaman George Bass, who sailed in a whaleboat, arriving from Sydney on 5 January 1798.

Phillip Island forms a natural breakwater for the shallow waters of the Western Port. It is 26 km (16 mi) long and 9 km (5.6 mi) wide, with an area of about 101 km^{2} (40 sq mi). It has 97 km (60 mi) of coastline and is part of the Bass Coast Shire.

A 640 m (2,100 ft) concrete bridge (originally a wooden bridge) connects the mainland town San Remo with the island town Newhaven. In the 2021 census, the island's permanent population was 13,799, compared to 7,071 in 2001. During the summer, the population swells to 40,000. 60% of the island is farmland devoted to grazing of sheep and cattle.

Phillip Island is formally recognised by UNESCO as part of the Mornington Peninsula and Western Port Biosphere Reserve. The designation as a UNESCO Biosphere Reserve highlights areas of exceptional natural significance where communities collaborate to promote sustainable living practices and sits within a global network of 759 Biosphere Reserves spanning 136 countries.

== History ==
The earliest inhabitants of the area were the Yalloc Bulluk clan of the Bunurong people, of the Kulin nation. In the Bunwurrung language the island is known as corriong or millowl. Their coastal territory with its sheltered bays meant that the Yalloc Bulluk, along with other Bunurong clans, were among the first Aboriginal people in Victoria to have contact with European mariners.

Following reports of the 1798 exploration by George Bass and Matthew Flinders, the area was frequented by sealers from Van Diemen's Land, whose interaction with the Bunurong people was not without conflict. In 1801, navigator James Grant visited the adjoining Churchill Island (which he named) and planted a crop of corn and wheat. In 1826, the scientific voyage of Dumont d'Urville, in command of the corvette Astrolabe, led to British concerns of an attempt by the French to establish a colony in Western Port. This saw the dispatch from Sydney of HMS Fly, under the command of Captain Wetherall, and the brigs Dragon and Amity, by Governor Darling.

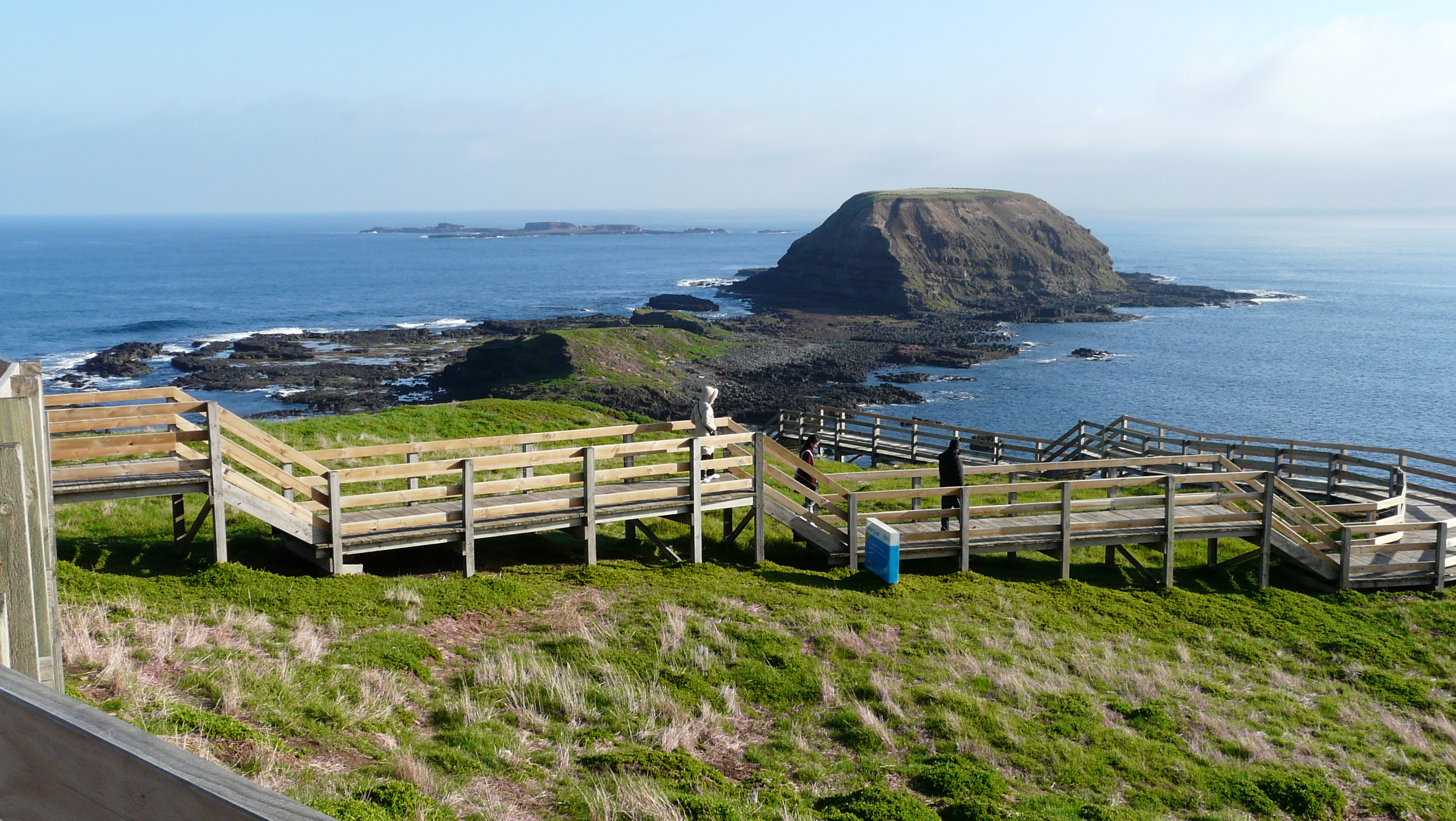
'The Nobbies': site of Captain Wetherall's 1826 flagstaff

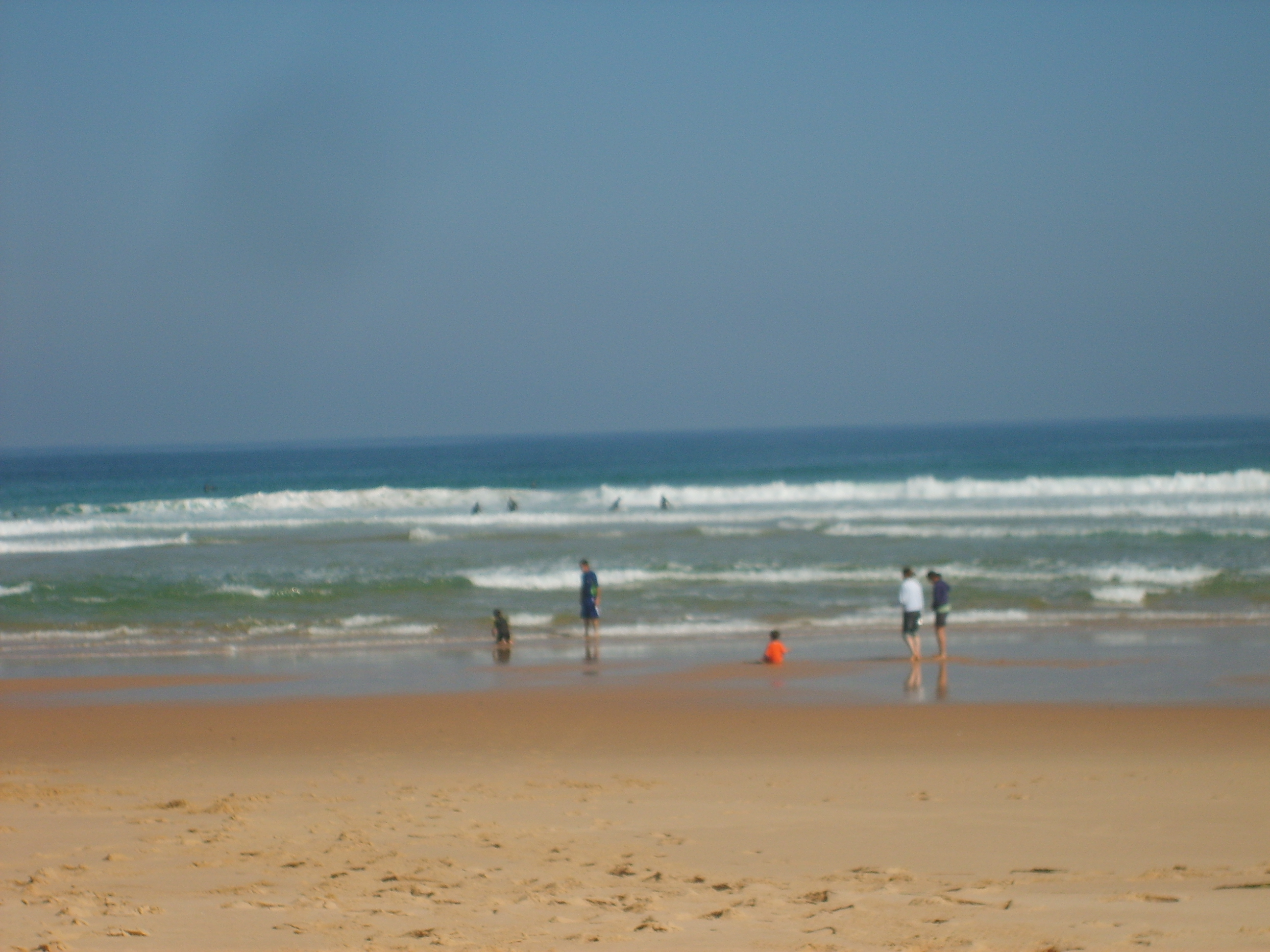
The beach at Cape Woolamai

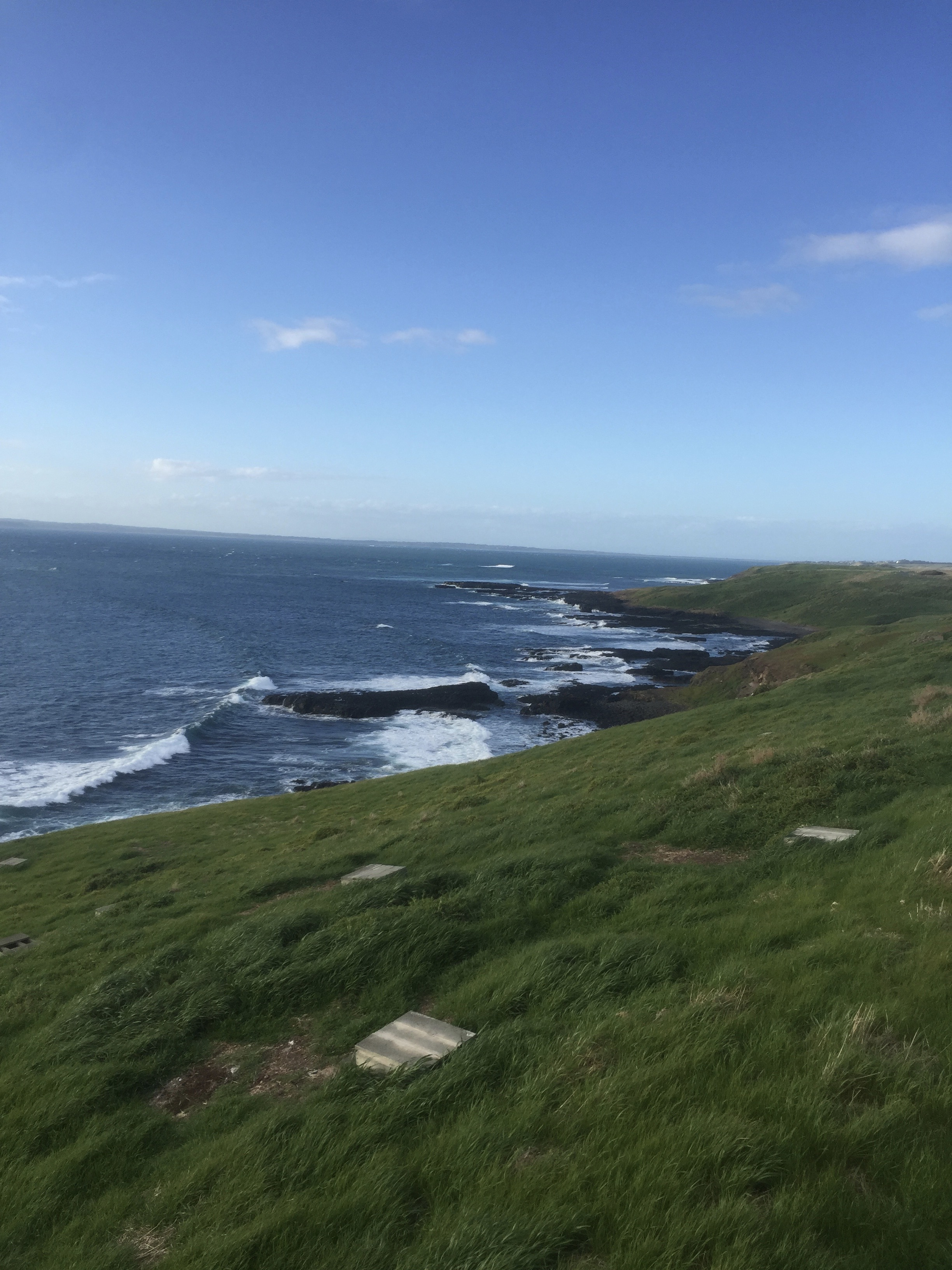
Phillip Island

While the French colonisation did not eventuate, Wetherall reported on finding a sealer's camp and also two acres of wheat and corn. A fort was constructed near Rhyll, and named Dumaresq after the Governor's private secretary. The "abundance" of wood, quality soil and the discovery of coal at Cape Woolamai, were mentioned in newspaper accounts. Wetherall also erected a flag staff on "the flat-top'd rock off Point Grant" (commonly known today as The Nobbies) on the Island's western extremity as a marker for the harbour entrance.

Of his encounters with the Bunurong people, Wetherall told Darling:

The Natives appear numerous, but we have not been able to obtain an interview, as they desert their camp, and run into the woods on our approach, watching our movements until we depart. As I am aware it is Your Excellency's wish to conciliate them as much as possible, I have not allowed them to be pursued, or molested in any way.

The only reservation Wetherall had was on the island's supply of water; he dug a "tide-well" near the fort but assessed the source as "not in sufficient quantities for the supply of shipping" and this problem would lead to the eventual move to Settlement Point on the mainland coast.

During the third voyage of HMS Beagle, in 1839, water was "found by digging in the centre of a clump of bushes on the outer part of the point at the N.E. extremity of the island, which at high water became an island, [and] occasionally made the water brackish" although it was noted "better might have been found a short distance in shore, as there were abundance of shrubs and other indications of water in the neighbourhood". The water question was again addressed, by Captain Moore, who accompanied Surveyor Robert Hoddle in 1840, that "water can be obtained on Phillip Island, near the best anchorage, off Sandy Point."

In 1835 Samuel Anderson established the third permanent settlement in what would be Victoria at the mainland site of Bass across the bay from Phillip Island. In 1841, brothers John David and William McHaffie, were granted Phillip Island as a squatting run and took possession in 1842. The McHaffies, and later settlers, assisted the Victorian Acclimatisation society (forerunner of the committee which established the Melbourne Zoo) by introducing animals such as pheasants, deer and wallabies to Phillip Island.

Plans for the first bridge to the island, from San Remo to Newhaven commenced in 1938, at a cost of £50,000, with the official opening by Premier Albert Dunstan taking place in November 1940. A full public holiday was declared on the island to celebrate.

In 2018, Phillip Island commemorated its 150th anniversary. To mark the moment, various events ran throughout the year including a community street parade, which took place on Saturday 3 November. The Phillip Island & District Historical Society serves as a repository of the Island’s history.

== Environment ==
=== Wildlife ===
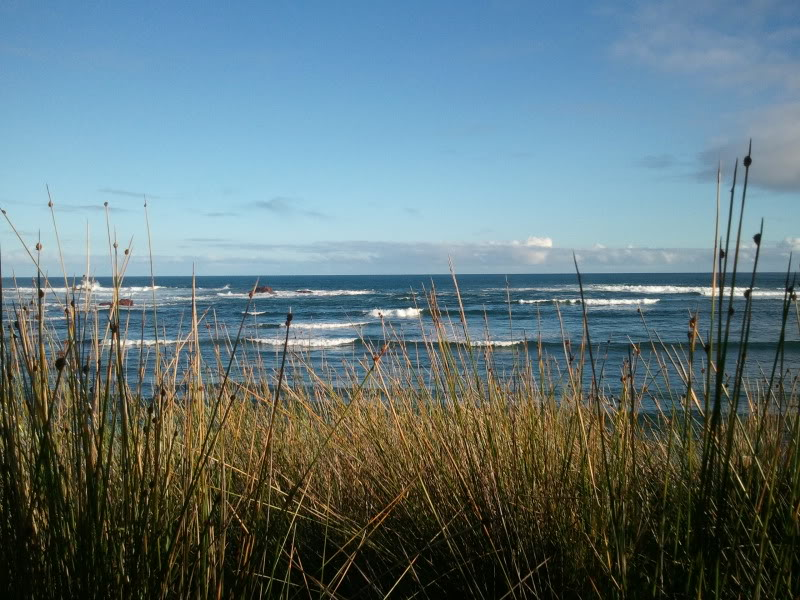
The coast of Phillip Island

Phillip Island Nature Parks manages nature conservation and ecotourism on the island.

The southern and western coasts of the island lie within the Phillip Island Important Bird Area, so identified by BirdLife International because of its importance in supporting significant populations of little penguins, short-tailed shearwaters and Pacific gulls. As of 2023 the island's population of little penguins is estimated at around 40,000, with the birds living on the Summerland Estate on the Summerland Peninsula (which was bought by the Victorian Government in the 1980s for use as a wildlife reserve). After many penguins died in a 2019 heatwave, native plants such as bower spinach were planted around penguin boxes to insulate them. Grass fires, largely due to poor practices since settlement, and projected to occur more frequently as a result of climate change, threaten the penguins' habitat, and it has been observed that they do not move away from fire. A project is under way to replace more flammable introduced plants with less flammable endemic species, creating natural firebreaks. The island's penguins have also been threatened by an invasive fox population. After the foxes were mostly eradicated in 2017, the absence of predators led to a rise in the invasive rabbit population, which in turn exacerbated erosion and threatened native orchid species. Conservationists have used phosphine gas to fumigate the island's extensive rabbit warrens, which can destabilise houses.

In addition, there is a wildlife park where wallabies and kangaroos roam freely amongst the visitors and can be fed by hand. Seal Rocks, at the western end of the island, hosts the largest colony of fur seals in Australia (up to 16,000 around 2008).

In recent years, other than local population of critically endangered endemic Burrunan dolphins or migratory killer whales, southern right whales and humpback whales are starting to show recoveries in the area long after commercial and illegal hunts by the Soviet Union with the help of Japan in 1970s, and the numbers using the area as nursery were growing rapidly by October 2014, allowing a rise in hopes to establish commercial whale watching activities in the vicinity of the island.

The Eastern barred bandicoot, a marsupial similar in size to a rabbit, is native to mainland Victoria. The mainland population faces significant challenges and remains the focus of ongoing conservation efforts. In recent years, successful reintroductions have taken place on Phillip Island and in the Westernport Bay region.

=== Climate ===
Phillip Island has an oceanic climate (Köppen: Cfb), with mild, fairly dry summers and cool, wetter winters. South-westerlies from Bass Strait keep conditions milder than Melbourne. Average highs range from 23.8 °C in February to 13.5 °C in July, and average lows from 14.0 °C to 6.8 °C. Annual rainfall is moderate at 738.1 mm, though precipitation is frequent, with about 151 days of rain each year, most common in winter. Sunshine is limited, with roughly 32 clear days and nearly 99 cloudy days annually. Recorded extremes span from 41.5 °C in January 2009 to –2.3 °C in July 1994. On 10 August 2005, snow was observed on the island. This was a very unusual event.

Climate data for Phillip Island (38.51°S 145.15°E, 7 m AMSL) (1981-2018 normals & extremes)
Month	Jan	Feb	Mar	Apr	May	Jun	Jul	Aug	Sep	Oct	Nov	Dec	Year
Record high °C (°F)	41.5 (106.7)	39.2 (102.6)	37.2 (99.0)	33.0 (91.4)	25.1 (77.2)	21.8 (71.2)	21.8 (71.2)	23.8 (74.8)	27.8 (82.0)	30.9 (87.6)	34.2 (93.6)	39.2 (102.6)	41.5 (106.7)
Mean daily maximum °C (°F)	23.7 (74.7)	23.8 (74.8)	22.3 (72.1)	19.8 (67.6)	16.8 (62.2)	14.4 (57.9)	13.5 (56.3)	14.5 (58.1)	16.1 (61.0)	17.8 (64.0)	19.8 (67.6)	21.9 (71.4)	18.7 (65.6)
Mean daily minimum °C (°F)	13.9 (57.0)	14.0 (57.2)	12.9 (55.2)	10.6 (51.1)	8.9 (48.0)	7.5 (45.5)	6.8 (44.2)	7.3 (45.1)	8.3 (46.9)	9.1 (48.4)	10.5 (50.9)	12.1 (53.8)	10.2 (50.3)
Record low °C (°F)	4.0 (39.2)	4.4 (39.9)	1.6 (34.9)	0.7 (33.3)	−0.2 (31.6)	−1.5 (29.3)	−2.3 (27.9)	−2.0 (28.4)	−1.0 (30.2)	0.6 (33.1)	0.5 (32.9)	1.7 (35.1)	−2.3 (27.9)
Average precipitation mm (inches)	33.4 (1.31)	34.0 (1.34)	49.4 (1.94)	63.1 (2.48)	70.0 (2.76)	78.2 (3.08)	76.9 (3.03)	79.7 (3.14)	69.5 (2.74)	66.9 (2.63)	60.0 (2.36)	48.9 (1.93)	738.1 (29.06)
Average precipitation days (≥ 0.2 mm)	7.8	6.8	9.5	12.5	13.9	15.3	17.6	17.7	15.9	13.8	11.4	9.2	151.4
Average afternoon relative humidity (%)	67	67	67	69	76	78	76	73	71	69	69	68	71
Average dew point °C (°F)	13.8 (56.8)	14.8 (58.6)	13.6 (56.5)	11.8 (53.2)	10.6 (51.1)	9.4 (48.9)	8.1 (46.6)	8.2 (46.8)	8.8 (47.8)	9.9 (49.8)	11.5 (52.7)	12.6 (54.7)	11.1 (52.0)
Source: Bureau of Meteorology (1981-2018 normals & extremes)

== Tourism ==
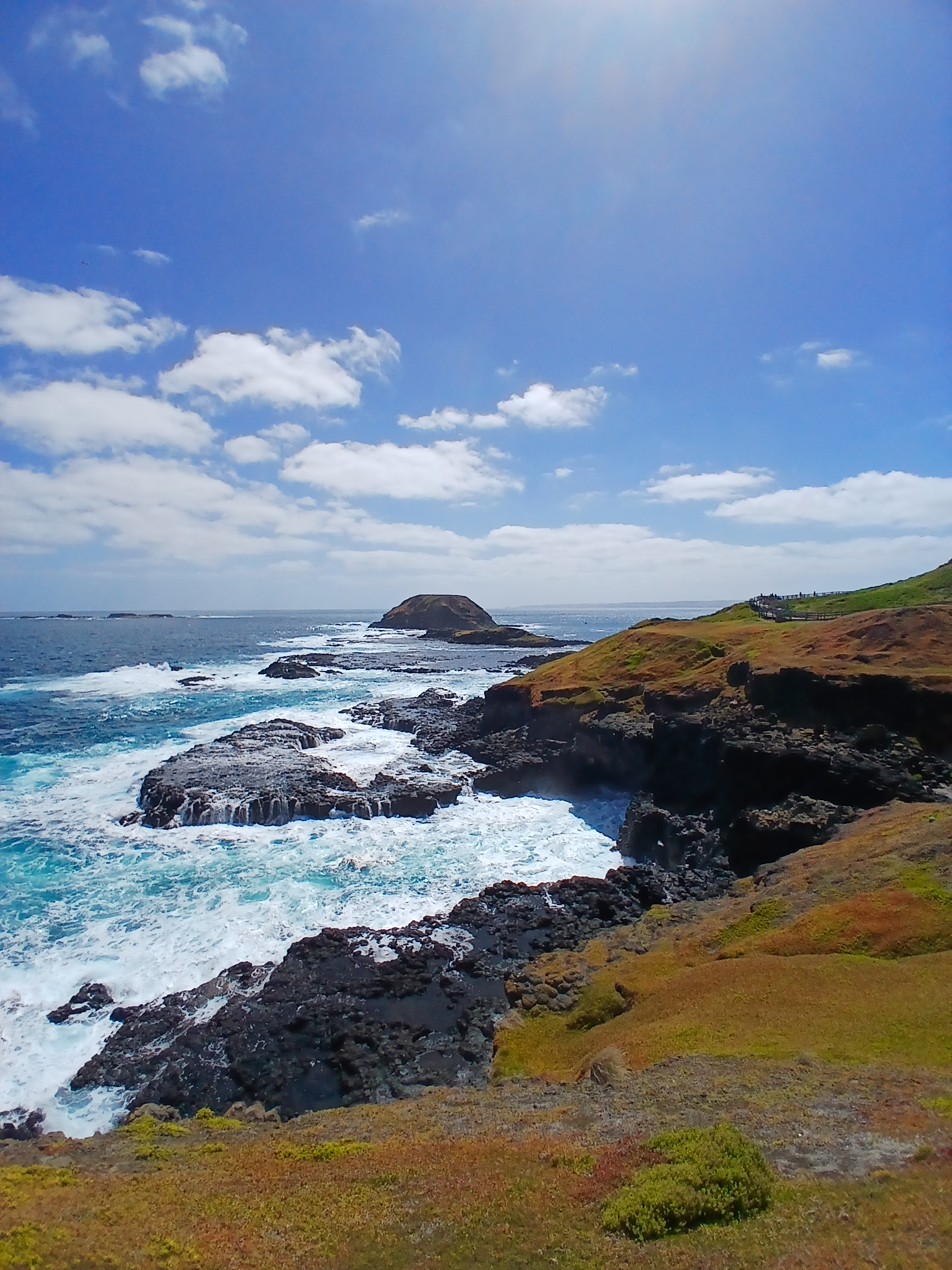
Phillip Island is a popular site for ecotourism. People can be seen here walking along the platform at the Nobbies Centre, on the western tip of the island.

Phillip Island is a significant tourist destination in Australia and is visited by 3.5 million people annually.

- The Penguin Parade at Summerland Beach is Phillip Island’s signature attraction. The island is home to approximately 40,000 little penguins making it the largest penguin colony in the world. Every evening at dusk, visitors gather in a controlled viewing area to watch hundreds of penguins emerge from the sea and waddle across the sand to their burrows in the dunes. This wildlife spectacle, which has been formally operating since the 1920s, is often called Australia’s most popular natural wildlife attraction, drawing people from around the world. The viewing infrastructure is managed by Phillip Island Nature Park to minimise disturbance to the penguins – there are boardwalks and seating, and a state-of-the-art Penguin Parade Visitor Centre (opened in 2019 to replace older facilities) that offers educational exhibits about penguin biology and island ecology. Photography is banned during the parade to protect the penguins. Over the years, the Penguin Parade has won numerous tourism awards for eco-tourism and remains a must-see highlight of Victoria.
- The Nobbies and Seal Rocks (Nobbies Centre): The Nobbies Centre is an ecotourism destination located at Point Grant, on the western tip of Phillip Island. Previously known as the Seal Rocks Sea Life Centre, the area is managed by the Phillip Island Nature Park. A network of boardwalks outside the centre allow visitors to view the local seal colony, The Nobbies, and The Blowhole (a sea cave), and Seal Rocks in the distance. It’s also a good spot to see wild animals: besides seals, the headland is frequented by seabirds and sometimes little penguins (in burrows along the boardwalk, usually visible at dusk). Dolphin and whale sightings (particularly humpback and southern right whales migrating in winter) have been recorded from The Nobbies. Entry to the boardwalks is free. Importantly, The Nobbies area is closed at sunset to avoid disturbance to penguins that come ashore there and to ensure tourist traffic is routed instead to the managed Penguin Parade site.
- Phillip Island is also renowned for its consistently reliable and diverse surf conditions, making it one of the premier surfing destinations in the country. In 2013, Victoria’s first National Surfing Reserve was established on the island, encompassing four key locations along the coast: Woolamai, Smiths Beach, Summerlands, and Cat Bay. The National Surfing Reserve is guided by the philosophy of “care, share, and preserve.” Phillip Island has a strong history of hosting major surfing events, including the Rip Curl Pro and the Roxy Pro Women’s Surfing Festival. Currently, it is the venue for the World Surfing League – Phillip Island Pro event.
- As whales embark on their annual migration north along the Victorian coastline, these magnificent creatures can be seen navigating the coastal waters around Phillip Island. Each year from May to September, the island becomes a seasonal haven for humpback whales, southern right whales, and occasionally, killer whales.
- Established by volunteer veterans, the National Vietnam Veterans Museum features a distinctive collection of artefacts, vehicles and memorabilia from the Vietnam War era, dedicated to supporting veterans and preserving the stories of service and sacrifice.
- Churchill Island Heritage Farm: Although not explicitly located on Phillip Island, Churchill Island is connected by bridge to Phillip Island near Newhaven. Churchill Island holds a special place in history as the site of Victoria’s first garden (1801) and has been preserved as a heritage farm. Managed by Phillip Island Nature Parks, the site includes a historic homestead (dating to the 1870s) and visitors can explore old cottages, see heritage breeds of farm animals, watch sheep shearing, cow milking, and horse-drawn wagon rides, and stroll in beautiful nineteenth-century gardens. Monthly farmers’ markets are also held there.

In September 2023 authorities issued a safety reminder after a 22-year-old woman fell 50 metres down a cliff edge from the Pinnacles Lookout at Cape Woolamai while taking photos for social media.

=== Motorsport ===
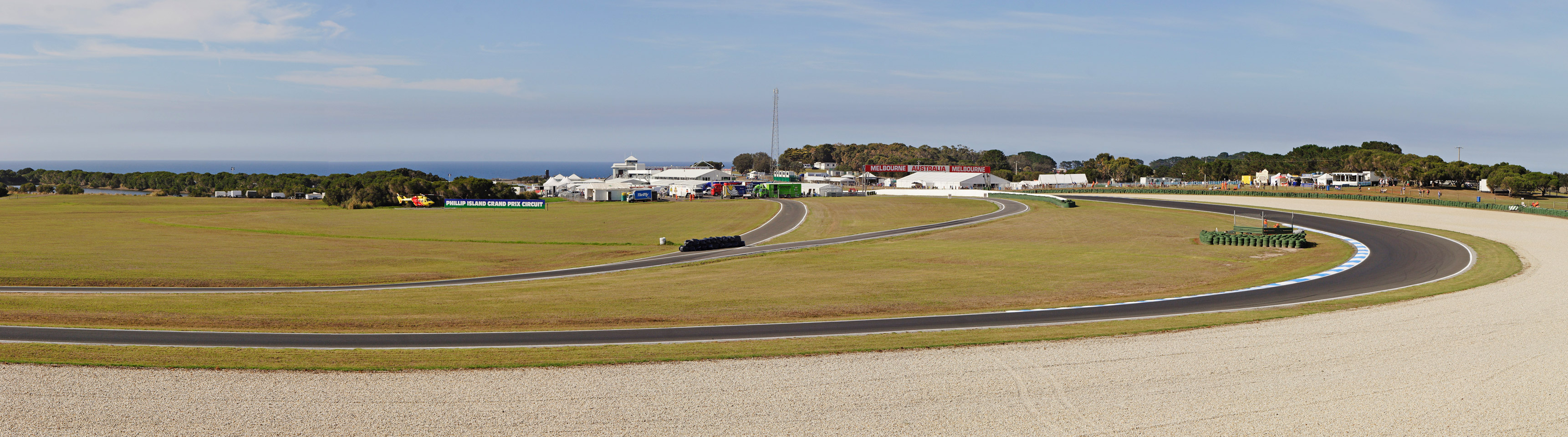
Overview of the Phillip Island Grand Prix Circuit

Phillip Island is steeped in the history of Australian motor racing. A temporary circuit utilizing the island's interior public roads was used for the inaugural Australian Grand Prix in 1928 and continued to be used for the race up until 1935. Racing on public road circuits continued through to 1940. In 1952 the Phillip Island Auto Racing Club was formed and commenced construction on the permanent Phillip Island Grand Prix Circuit which opened in 1956. In 1960, the inaugural Armstrong 500 was held, although, with the bridge to the mainland unable to support heavy hotmix bitumen equipment, the track broke up during the third running of the race in 1962. The damage rendered the circuit unusable for racing and for 1963 the Armstrong 500 was relocated to the Mount Panorama Circuit and over time evolved into what is known today as the Bathurst 1000.

The circuit was refurbished and was reopened in October 1967. It was closed in 1978, but was redeveloped and re-opened in 1988 and the following year hosted the first international version of the Australian motorcycle Grand Prix. It continues to host the race today and is also a venue for rounds of the Superbike World Championship, the V8 Supercars Championship and the Australian Drivers' Championship.

The MotoGP Championship has been a feature of Phillip Island for many years. The final race was scheduled to occur in 2026, but was cancelled due to bad weather. MotoGP will move to Adelaide in 2027.

== Phillip Island in popular culture ==
Phillip Island has been featured in a wide range of media from fiction and non-fiction books to poetry, documentaries, and Hollywood films. Known for its coastal scenery and Penguin Parade, the island has served as a backdrop in Australian literature, television, and nature documentaries. It has also appeared in international productions, with its dramatic landscapes lending themselves to film and TV, solidifying its place in both Australian culture and global media. The most famous example is On the Beach, which brought Hollywood royalty Fred Astaire, Gregory Peck, Ava Gardner and Anthony Perkins to Phillip Island, whilst filming scenes at the Grand Prix Circuit.

=== Films ===
- On the Beach (1959)
- Summerfield (1977)
- The Hands of Cormac Joyce (1972)

==== Documentary films ====
- Martin Clunes: Islands of Australia (2016)
- Penguin Island (2010) by BBC

==== Short films ====
- Mermaid homesick (2016)
- Spotwind (2020)
- Severance Bay (2023)

== Books about Phillip Island ==
- Phillip Island and Western Port (1989) by Jean Edgecombe
- The Facing Island (2003) by Jan Bassett
- Phillip Island: A history of motorsport since 1928 (2005) by Jim Scraysbrook
- Islands of Australia (2009) by Marc Fiddian
- 500 Million years on Phillip Island (2021) by Linda Cuttriss and Eric Bird
- Once upon an Island: The early days of Phillip Island (2023)
- The Littlest Penguin and the Phillip Island Penguin Parade (2023) by Jedda Robbard
- Phillip Island: The inside story of Australia's fastest racetrack, our home of motorsport (2024) by John Smailes

== Localities ==
Towns on the island include:

- Cape Woolamai
- Cowes
- Newhaven
- Rhyll
- Silverleaves
- Smiths Beach
- Summerlands
- Sunderland Bay
- Surf Beach
- Ventnor
- Wimbledon Heights

== Notable residents ==
- William Watt, politician
- Frank Sedgman, tennis player
- Alan Jackson, business executive
- Graeme Strachan, singer
- Manning Clark, historian
- Chris Hemsworth, actor
- Liam Hemsworth, actor
- Luke Hemsworth, actor
- Alexandra Flood, soprano
- Georgia Flood, actress
- Nikki van Dijk, professional surfer
- Sam Docherty, AFL footballer

== Land rezoning decision and reversal ==
In September 2011, state planning minister Matthew Guy overruled Bass Coast Shire and rezoned a 5.7-hectare farming property at Ventnor from farmland into the township, making it available for development. The rezoning decision was unpopular, with one hundred submissions calling for the town boundaries to be retained, while only one submission from the developers supported the rezoning. Those opposed to the rezoning included American singer Miley Cyrus, who tweeted to her 2.5 million followers that "Phillip Island is such a magical place, it would be a shame to see it change". Days later, Guy reversed his decision.

The developer behind the rezoning, Carley Nicholls, claims to have received a favourable hearing from Guy when she briefed him on the scheme at a "kitchen table meeting" in her home months before he controversially approved it. Nicholls purchased the property based on the rezoning decision and subsequently sought to sue Guy and have his original rezoning decision reinstated. In defence, Guy stated in court documents that he acted "in error" in rezoning the land relying on the advice of ministerial staff and that he overturned his decision after learning that the Bass Coast Shire Council opposed the extension of town boundaries at Ventnor. Guy denied discussing the Ventnor project with Ms Nicholls or even knowing of her interest in the property.

Legal proceedings terminated in August 2013 with a multimillion-dollar out-of-court settlement to Nicholls. In October 2013, the Victorian ombudsman George Brouwer launched an investigation into Guy's decision to rezone the Ventnor site, against the original advice of his department, the department's lawyers, the local Bass Coast shire and an independent planning panel. The settlement cost Victoria $2.5 million plus costs, for a total of more than $3.5 million, documents reveal. Senior lawyers had told the government that it should have paid a maximum of $250,000 plus legal costs.

In early 2014, Guy overruled his department to block the release of freedom of information documents about the botched rezoning of farmland on Phillip Island.

== See also ==
- Western Port
- French Island
- Mornington Peninsula and Western Port Biosphere Reserve
- List of islands of Australia
- History of Victoria
- Tourism in Australia
