= Phillip Island Nature Park =

Conservation park in Victoria, Australia

Coordinates: 38°29′S 145°14′E

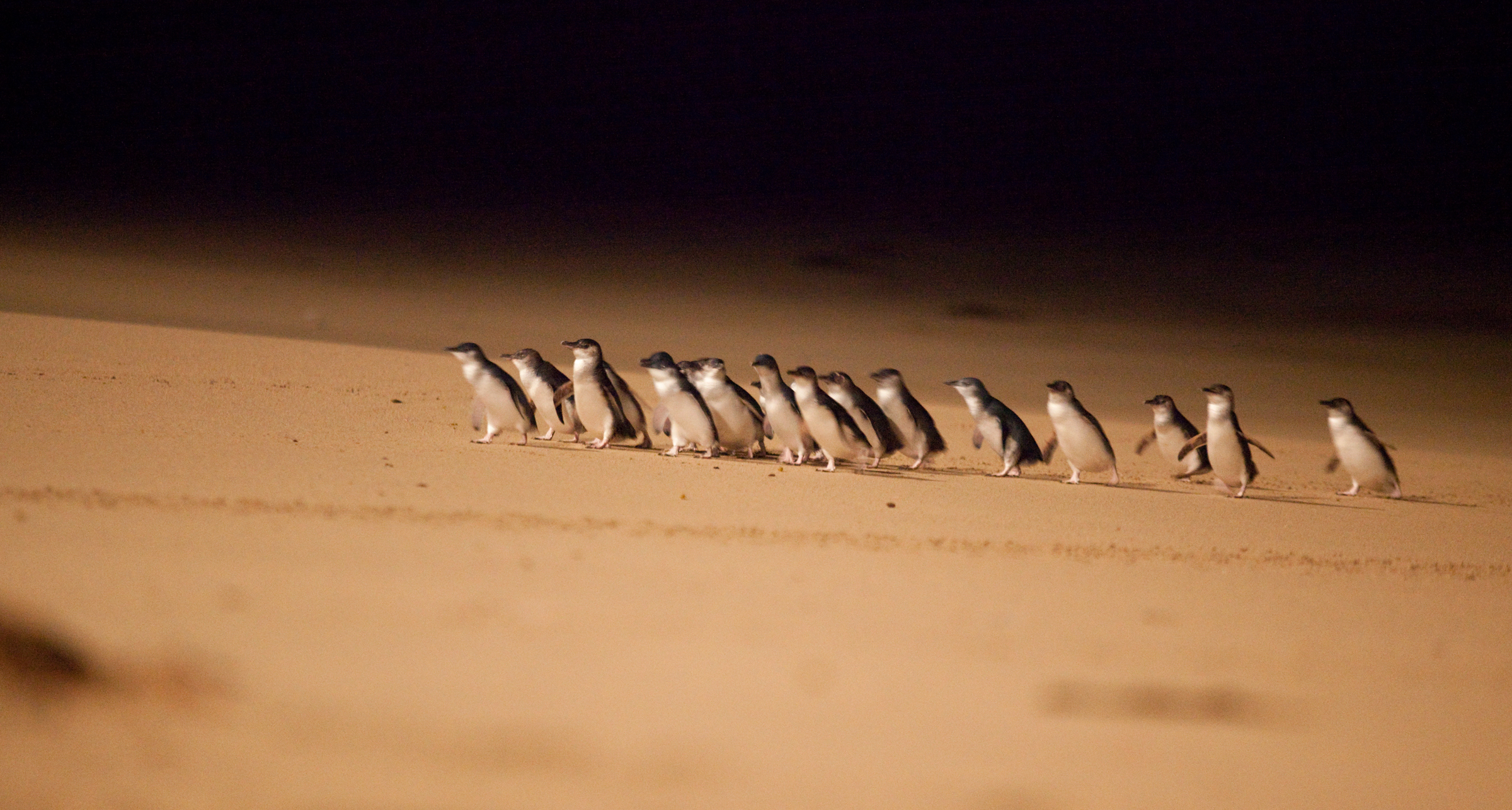
Little penguins returning to their burrows on Phillip Island

Phillip Island Nature Park (PINP) is a conservation park located on Phillip Island, Victoria, Australia. Created in 1996, the park is owned by the Victorian State Government; however, it is a self-funding commercial attraction for the purpose of animal conservation and research. An oil spill off the island in January, 2000 led to a worldwide appeal for hand-knitted penguin sweaters.

Located 1.5 hours drive south-east of Melbourne, PINP covers several separate areas over 1805 hectares. The parks include Pyramid Rock, Rhyll Inlet, Seal Rocks, and Cape Woolamai, with specific viewing and attraction areas that include the Nobbies Centre (seals, dolphins, and shark viewing), the Penguin Parade (little penguins coming ashore at dusk), Koala Conservation Centre, and the Churchill Island Heritage Farm.

Phillip Island’s Penguin Parade is the only commercial venue in the world where penguins can be seen in their own environment, and attracts tourists from different parts of the world. The Koala Conservation Centre is dedicated to koala research and conservation and allows the opportunity to view koalas in their natural habitat on treetop boardwalks.

Much of the park lies within the Phillip Island Important Bird Area, so identified by BirdLife International because of its importance in supporting significant populations of little penguins, short-tailed shearwaters and Pacific gulls.

== Gallery ==
The location of the penguin parade, Summerland Peninsula, Victoria

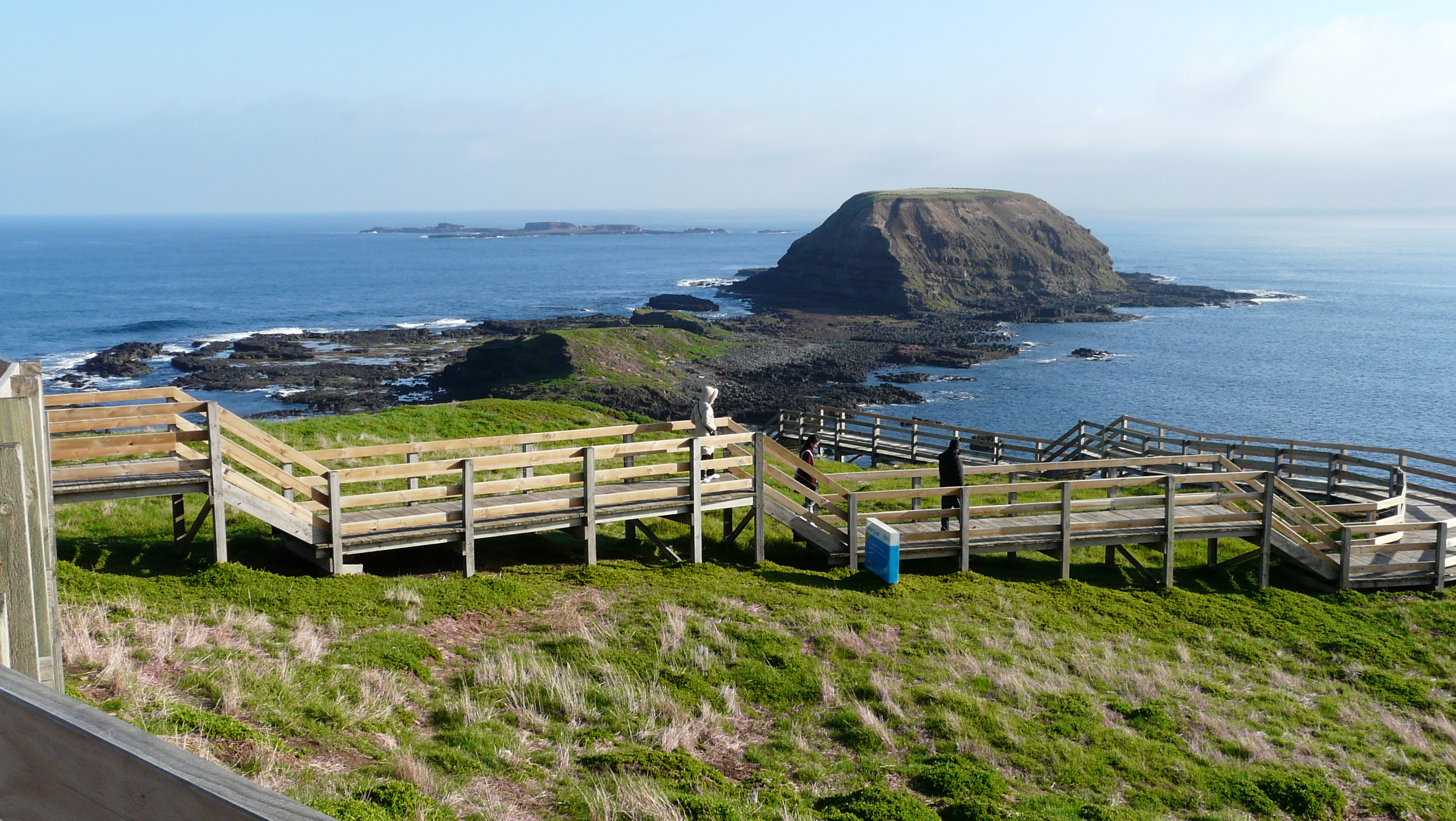
View from the Nobbies Centre

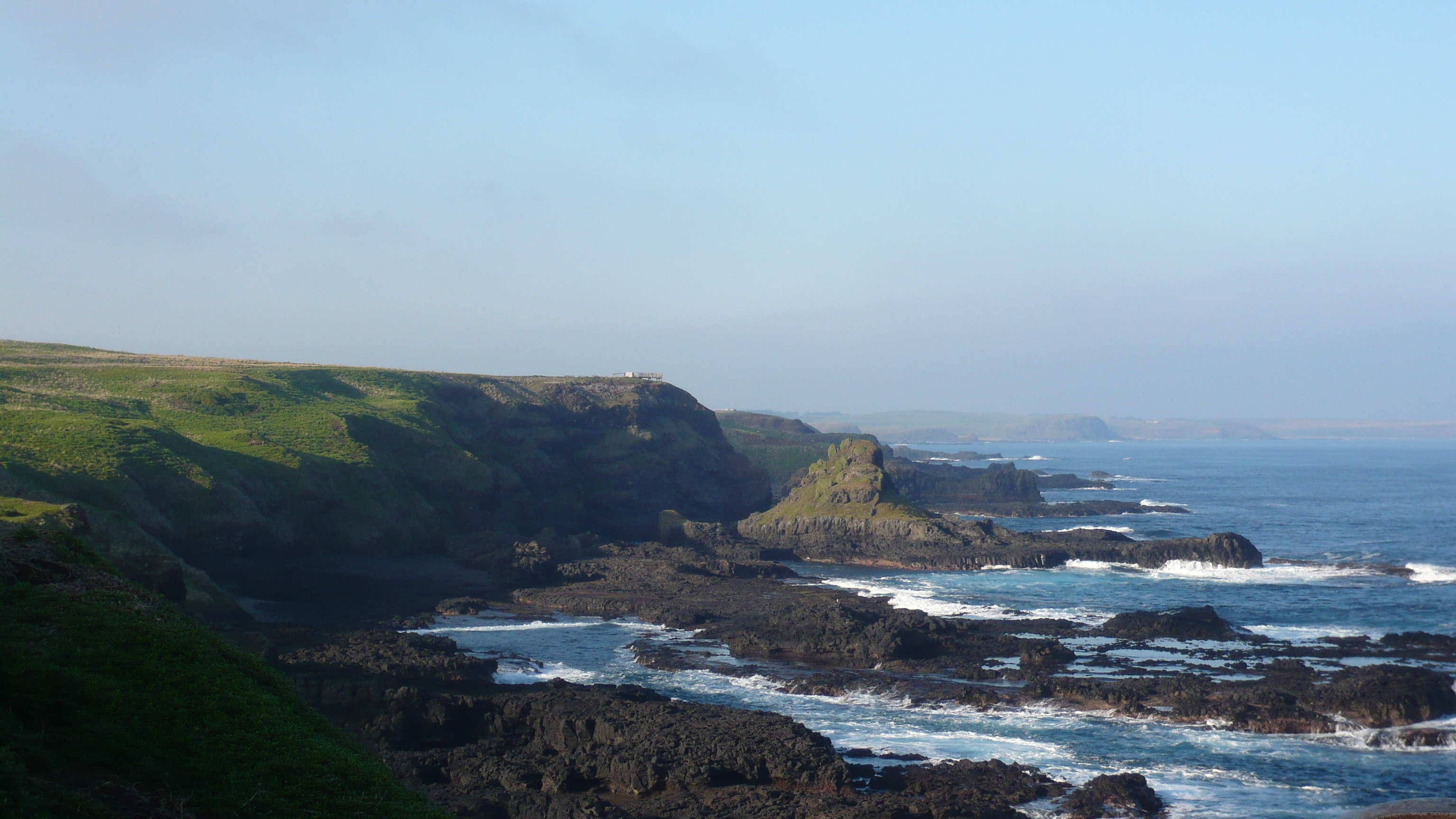
Another view from the Nobbies Centre

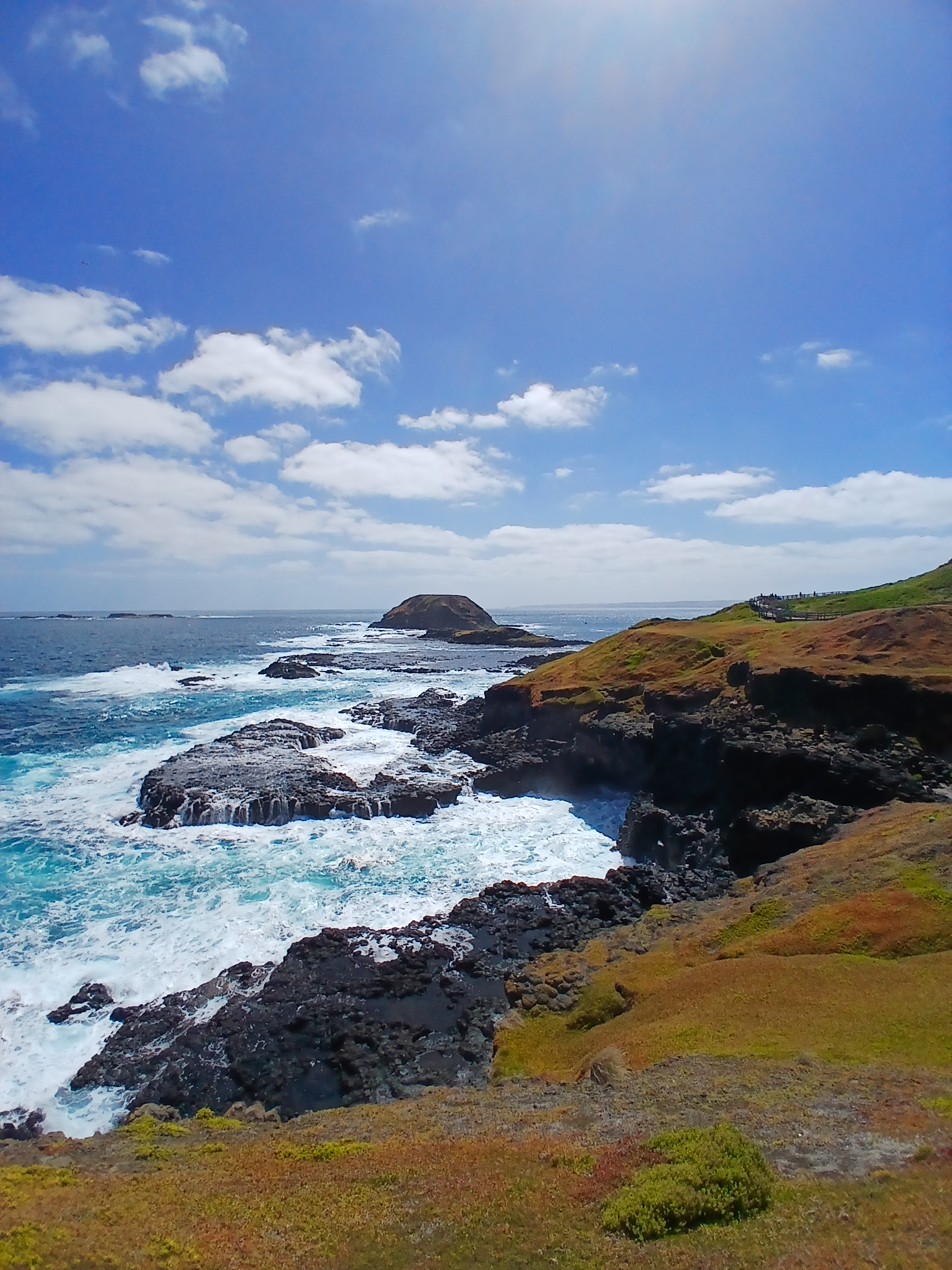
A further view from the Nobbies Centre

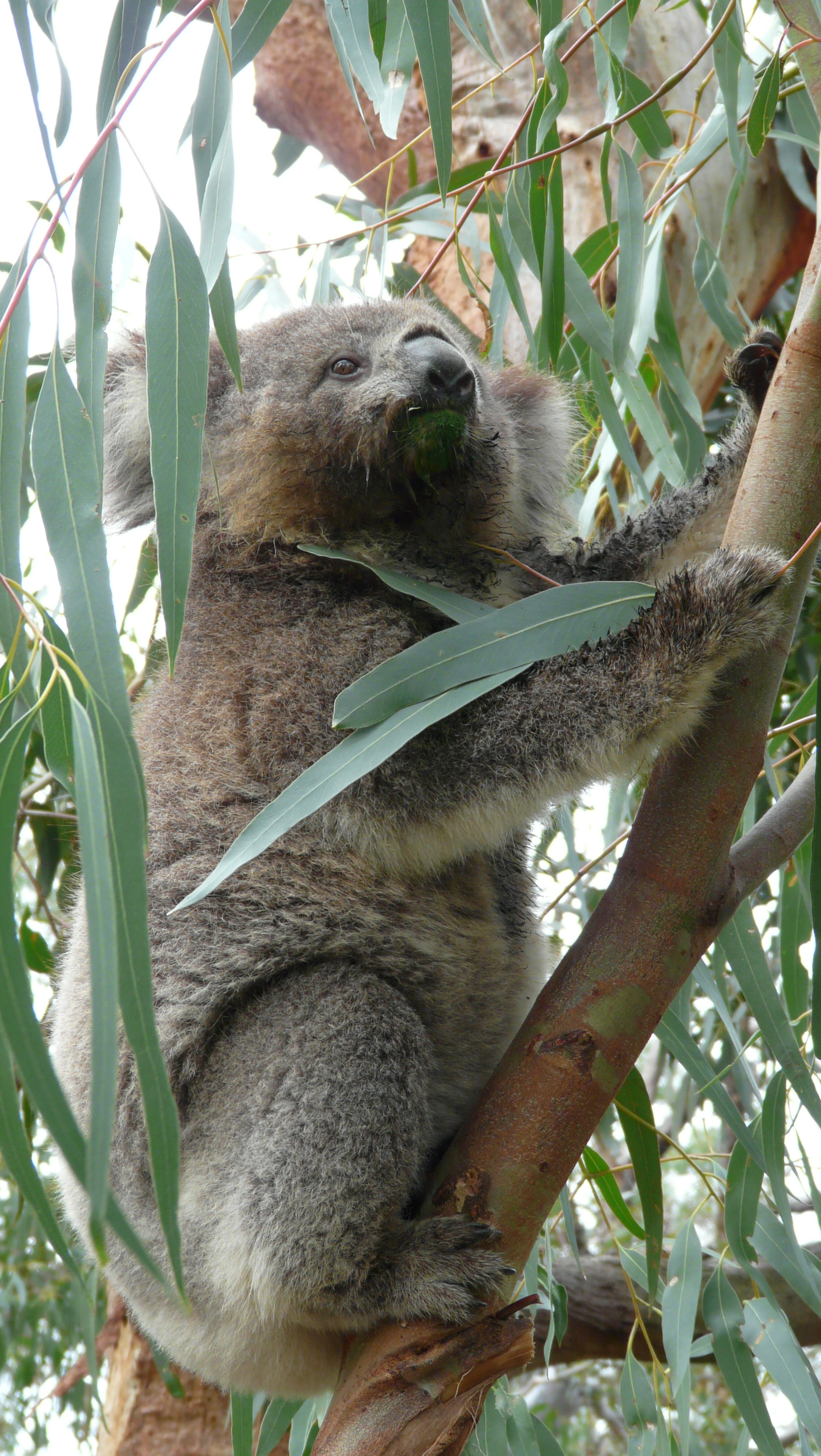
Upclose of a koala in the Conservation Centre
