= Nobbies Centre =

Ecotourism destination in Victoria, Australia

Coordinates: 38.517476°S 145.118115°E

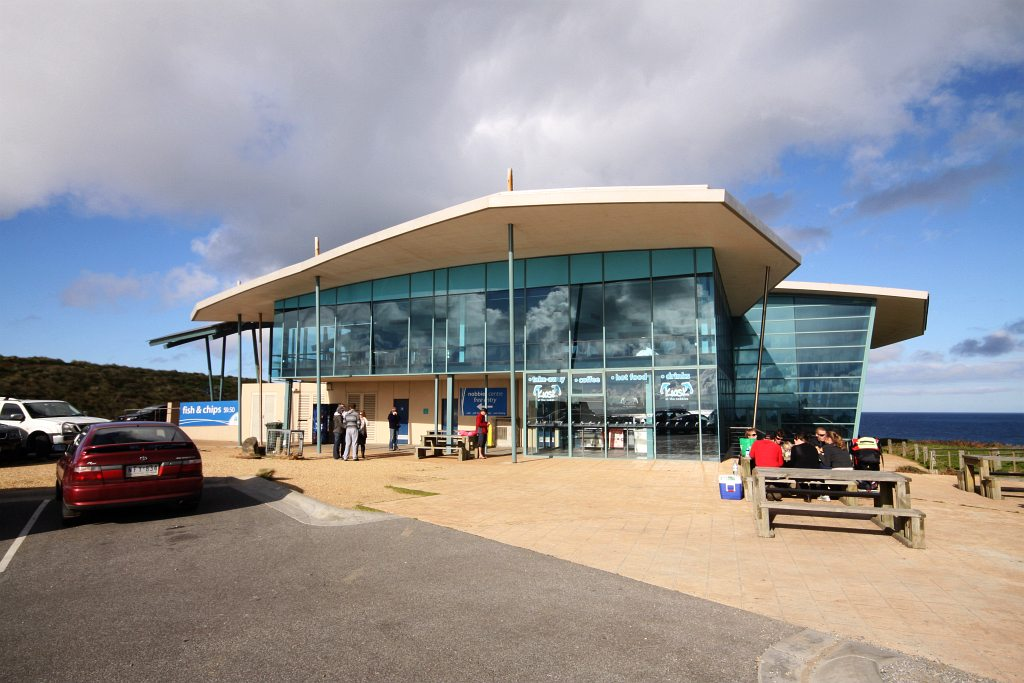
Exterior of the Nobbies Centre

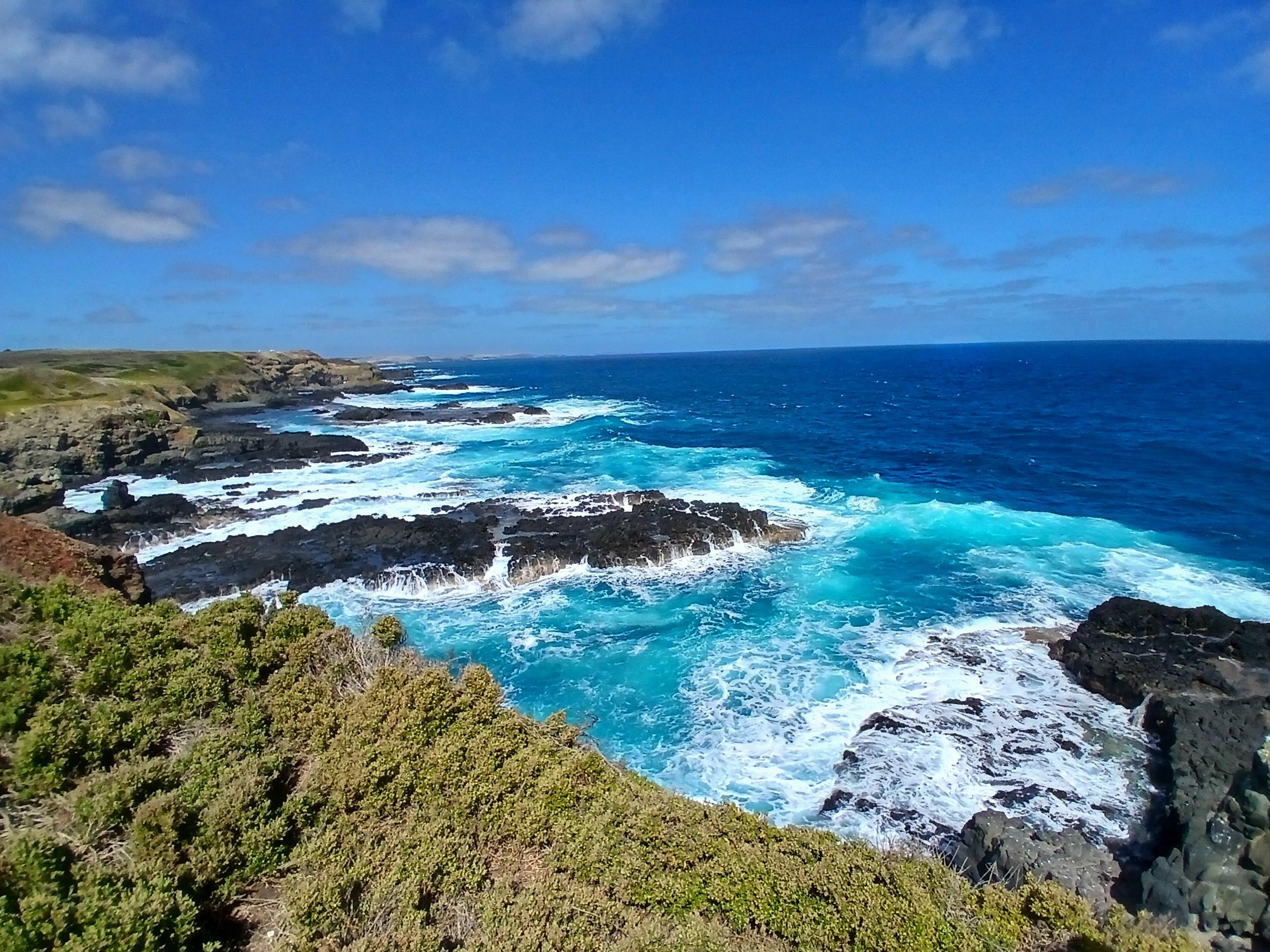
Looking east from a viewpoint at the Nobbies Centre

The Nobbies Centre is an ecotourism destination located at Point Grant, on the western tip of Phillip Island, Victoria, Australia. Once known as the Seal Rocks Sea Life Centre, the centre is managed by the Phillip Island Nature Park, and features educational displays, a cafe, a children's play area, and a gift shop. Overlooking Seal Rocks, Australia's largest colony of fur seals, with an estimated 16,000 inhabiting the area, around half a million people visit the centre yearly, with 53% being international visitors. A network of boardwalks outside the centre allow visitors to view the seal colony, The Nobbies, and The Blowhole.

== History ==
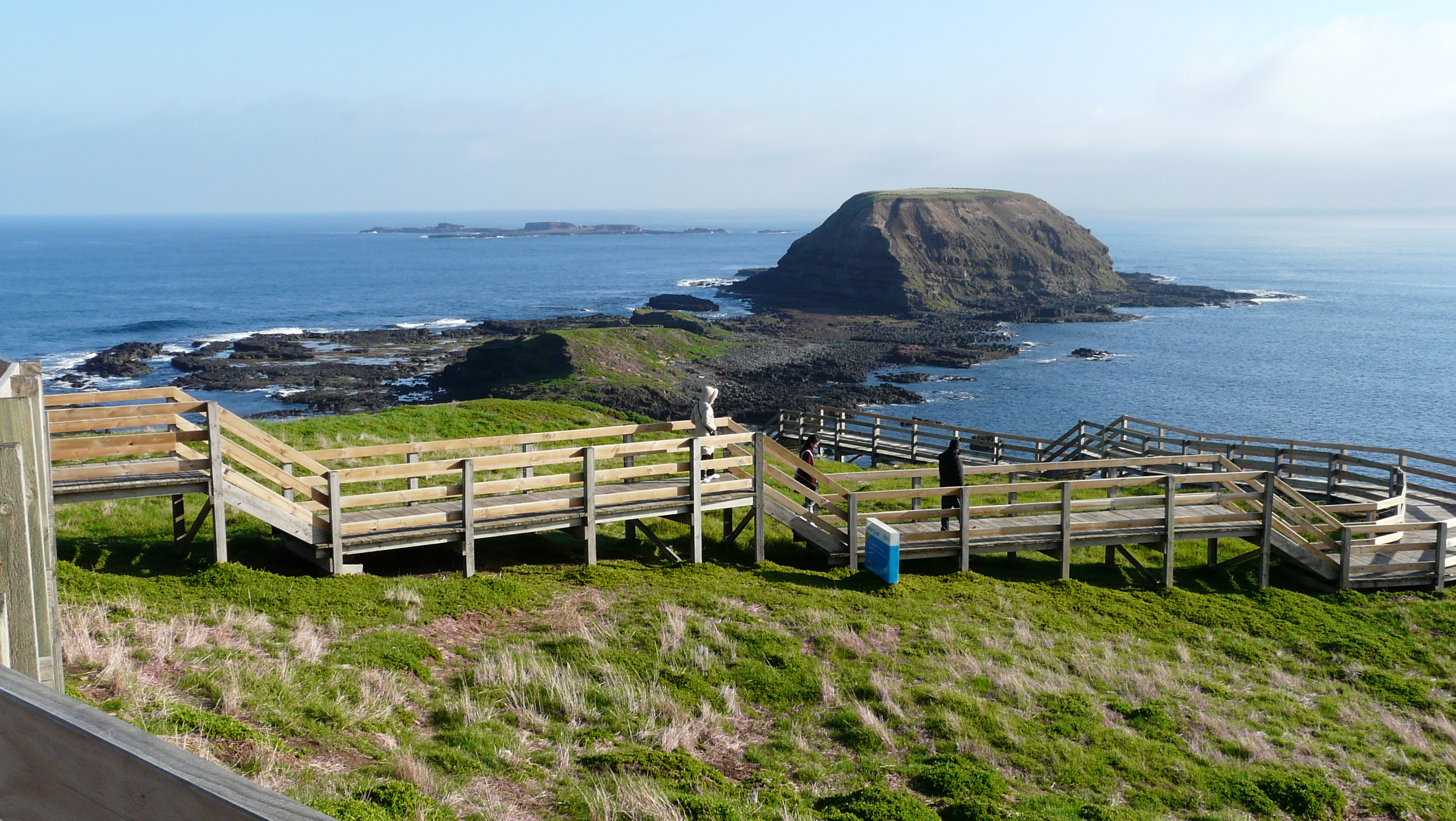
Looking over The Nobbies towards Seal Rocks

Work towards a privately developed marine centre at Point Grant commenced in January 1995 where a call for tenders was made by the Kennett Government. The winner was Seal Rocks Victoria Australia Pty Ltd (SRVA), which signed a 25-year build-operate-transfer contract with the State of Victoria in March 1997. The centre opened in April 1998 as the privately operated "Seal Rocks Sea Life Centre", with stage one of the development completed at a cost of $13 million, including the Nobbies Centre seen today. Stage two was to cost $50 million, and was to include a 1.9 kilometre long undersea tunnel leading to an observation tower at Seal Rocks. That expansion was opposed by local independent MP Susan Davies, who held the balance of power in the Bracks Government which took power at the 1999 state election.

Contractual disputes relating to stage two of the project resulted in SRVA lodging a compensation claim against the State Government for breach of contract, resulting in the appointment of an independent arbitrator in July 2000 to settle the matter. An interim order was handed down in August 2002, finding that the Government had breached the original contract, and required the Government to pay $37.3 million in compensation in addition to the legal fees of the operator. The Government appealed the order in the Supreme Court of Victoria, and in September 2002 SRVA also lodged its own application in the Supreme Court, seeking up to $400 million as compensation for loss of future earnings. The State Government appeal was rejected in April 2003, with the Auditor-General finding in November 2003 that the final cost to the Government was $55.9 million. That was made up of $37.3 million compensation, $5.6 million in costs to SRVA, and $9.3 million in Government legal fees.

The centre itself closed on 12 August 2002, after a mini-tornado tore the roof from the building, causing $200,000 damage and leaving 30 staff members out of work. In May 2005 the State Government announced $7.1 million in funding to repair the centre, which reopened to the public in April 2007.
