= Shire of Bass =

Coordinates: 38°33′S 145°34′E

Shire of Bass Victoria
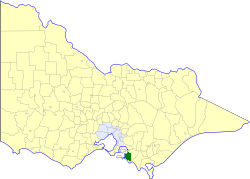
- Location in Victoria
- The Shire of Bass as at its dissolution in 1994
- Population: 5,170 (1992)
  - Density: 9.829/km^{2} (25.46/sq mi)
- Established: 1871
- Area: 526 km^{2} (203.1 sq mi)
- Council seat: Archies Creek
- Region: South Gippsland
- County: Mornington
LGAs around Shire of Bass:
Western Port	Cranbourne	Korumburra
Phillip Island	Shire of Bass	Korumburra
Bass Strait	Bass Strait	Wonthaggi (B); Woorayl

The Shire of Bass was a local government area about 120 kilometres (75 mi) south-southeast of Melbourne, the state capital of Victoria, Australia. The shire covered an area of 526 square kilometres (203.1 sq mi), and existed from 1871 until 1994.

Its administrative centre was located in Archies Creek.

== History ==
Bass was first incorporated as the Phillip Island Road District on 8 September 1871, and became the Shire of Phillip Island and Woolamai on 24 December 1874. When the Phillip Island Riding was severed on 19 September 1928, its name changed to the Shire of Woolamai, and finally the Shire of Bass on 8 January 1929. It was reduced and redefined in 1977, including the loss of North Wonthaggi to the Borough of Wonthaggi.

The shire's area covered the majority of the mainland of the currently existing Bass Coast Shire, except for the areas of Wonthaggi, Inverloch, parts of the areas south of Korumburra and some of the coastline southwest of The Gurdies. The shire area spanned from the tiny township of The Gurdies (located approximately 90 kilometres (56 mi) south of Melbourne, on the Bass Highway) to Dalyston, while the northern parts spanned around Kernot, Almurta, Glen Forbes and other areas northwest of Inverloch.

On 2 December 1994, the Shire of Bass was abolished, and along with the Borough of Wonthaggi, the Shire of Phillip Island and parts of the City of Cranbourne and the Shires of Korumburra and Woorayl, was merged into the newly created Bass Coast Shire.

== Wards ==
The Shire of Bass was divided into three ridings, each of which elected three councillors:

- Bass Valley Riding
- Powlett Riding
- Woolamai Riding

== Towns and localities ==
- Almurta
- Anderson
- Archies Creek*
- Bass
- Corinella
- Coronet Bay
- Dalyston
- Glen Alvie
- Glen Forbes
- Grantville
- Kernot
- Kilcunda
- San Remo
- Woolamai

* Council seat.

== Population ==
Year	Population
1954	3,761
1958	3,990*
1961	3,851
1966	3,834
1971	3,752
1976	3,947
1981	3,221
1986	4,010
1991	4,903

* Estimate in the 1958 Victorian Year Book.
