= Phillip Island Road =

Road in Victoria, Australia

Phillip Island Road Thompson Avenue Victoria
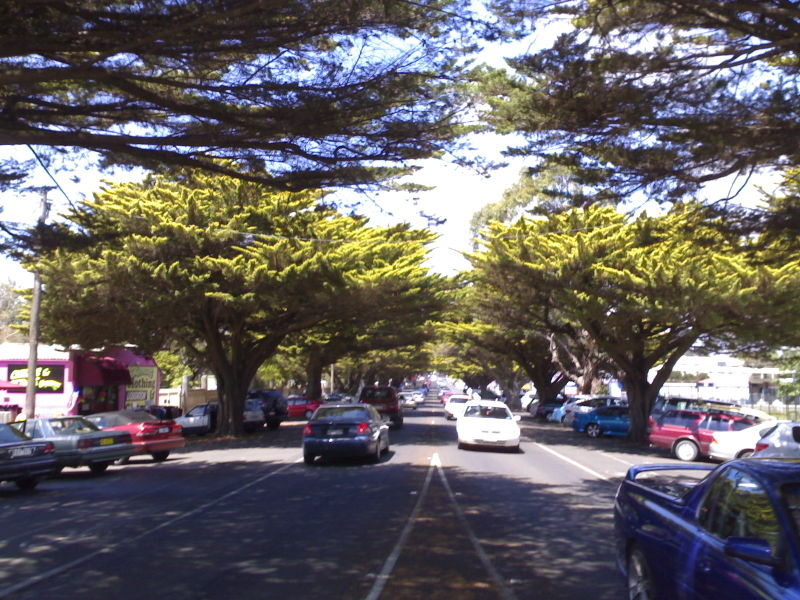
- Phillip Island Road, Cowes
- Coordinates: 38.448036°S 145.238993°E (West end); 38.507350°S 145.450894°E (East end)

General information
- Type: Road
- Length: 24.9 km (15 mi)
- Gazetted: September 1914
- Route number(s): B420 (1998–present) Entire route (via Phillip Island Link Road); C439 (2013–present, unsigned) (Old Phillip Island Road: through Anderson)
- Former route number: B420 (1998–2013) (Old Phillip Island Road: through Anderson); State Route 186 (1986–1998) Entire route (via Old Phillip Island Road)

Major junctions
Phillip Island Road
- West end: The Esplanade; Cowes, Victoria
- Ventnor Road; Back Beach Road; Old Phillip Island Road
- East end: Bass Highway; Bass, Victoria
Old Phillip Island Road
- West end: Phillip Island Road; Anderson, Victoria
- East end: Bass Highway; Anderson, Victoria

Location(s)
- Major suburbs: Wimbledon Heights, Cape Woolamai, San Remo

Phillip Island Road (and its northern section as Thompson Avenue) is a tourist road in Victoria, Australia, serving as the main gateway to Phillip Island, in southern Westernport Bay. It branches off Bass Highway south of the township of Bass to link with Cowes on the northern coast of the island.

== Route ==
Phillip Island Road commences at the intersection of The Esplanade in Cowes, on the northern coast of the island, and runs south as a two-lane, single carriageway road as Thompson Avenue as the town's main street, before reaching a roundabout with Ventor and Cowes-Rhyll Road shortly afterwards, changes name to Phillip Island Road and continues in a south-easterly direction, passing a turn-off to Cape Woolamai, to the easternmost point of the island at Newhaven. It crosses Westernport Bay over Phillip Island Bridge and continues on the mainland through San Remo to eventually terminate at the interchange with Bass Highway in the south of Bass.

== History ==
The passing of the Country Roads Act 1912 through the Parliament of Victoria provided for the establishment of the Country Roads Board (later VicRoads) and their ability to declare Main Roads, taking responsibility for the management, construction and care of the state's major roads from local municipalities. (Main) Coast Road from San Remo to Anderson (and continuing east to Lang Lang), was declared a Main Road on 7 September 1914.

The passing of the Developmental Roads Act 1918 through the Parliament of Victoria allowed the Country Road Board to declare Developmental Roads, serving to develop any area of land by providing access to a railway station for primary producers. Phillip Island Road between Cowes and Newhaven was declared a Developmental Road on 3 March 1924.

Phillip Island Bridge, at the time a suspension bridge, was opened in November 1940, linking San Remo on the mainland to Newhaven on the island; this was replaced by a cantilever bridge in November 1969.

Phillip Island Road was signed as State Route 186 between Cowes and Anderson in 1986. With Victoria's conversion to the newer alphanumeric system in the late 1990s, this was replaced by route B420. An upgrade of Bass Highway included a new link road to Phillip Island Road in 2013; the alignment of its eastern end was connected directly to Bass Highway in Bass, bypassing the town of Anderson.

The passing of the Road Management Act 2004 granted the responsibility of overall management and development of Victoria's major arterial roads to VicRoads: in 2018, VicRoads re-declared the road as Phillip Island Road (Arterial #4971) between The Esplanade in Cowes and Bass Highway in Bass.

== Major intersections ==
Both Phillip Island Road and Old Phillip Island Road are entirely contained within the Bass Coast Shire local government area.

=== Phillip Island Road ===
Location	km	mi	Destinations	Notes
Cowes	0.0	0.0	The Esplanade – Cowes	Western terminus of road (declared) and route B420; Northern end of Thompson Avenue
Cowes	1.7	1.1	Ventnor Road (C473 west) – Ventnor, Summerlands; Cowes–Rhyll Road (east) – Rhyll	Southern end of Thompson Avenue, northern end of Phillip Island Road (sign-posted)
Sunset Strip–Rhyll boundary	7.5	4.7	Back Beach Road (C478) – Summerlands	Roundabout
Cape Woolamai–Newhaven boundary	13.4	8.3	Woolamai Beach Road – Cape Woolamai	Roundabout
Westernport Bay	16.2– 16.8	10.1– 10.4	Phillip Island Bridge	
Anderson	22.5	14.0	Old Phillip Island Road (C439) – Anderson, to Bass Highway (B460 south) – Wonthaggi, Inverloch	
Bass	24.9	15.5	Bass Highway (M420 north) – Grantville, Lang Lang, Melbourne	Northbound entrance to and southbound exit from Bass Highway only Eastern terminus of road and route B420, route M420 continues along Bass Highway
1.000 mi = 1.609 km; 1.000 km = 0.621 mi: Incomplete access; Route transition

=== Old Phillip Island Road ===
Location	km	mi	Destinations	Notes
Anderson	0.0	0.0	Phillip Island Road (B420) – Phillip Island, Grantville, Lang Lang	Western terminus of road and route C439
Anderson	1.6	0.99	Bass Highway (B460) – Melbourne, Wonthaggi, Inverloch	Eastern terminus of road and route C439 at roundabout
1.000 mi = 1.609 km; 1.000 km = 0.621 mi: Route transition

== See also ==
- Highways in Australia
- Highways in Victoria
