= Peter Reith =

Australian politician (1950–2022)

The Honourable Peter Reith AM
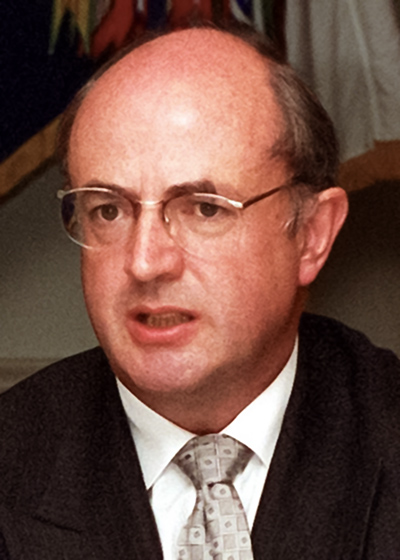
- Reith in 2001

Minister for Defence
- In office 30 January 2001 – 26 November 2001
- Prime Minister: John Howard
- Preceded by: John Moore
- Succeeded by: Robert Hill

Minister for Employment and Workplace Relations
- In office 18 July 1997 – 30 January 2001
- Prime Minister: John Howard
- Preceded by: David Kemp
- Succeeded by: Tony Abbott

Minister for Small Business
- In office 18 July 1997 – 30 January 2001
- Prime Minister: John Howard
- Preceded by: Geoff Prosser
- Succeeded by: Ian Macfarlane

Leader of the House
- In office 11 March 1996 – 8 October 2001
- Prime Minister: John Howard
- Preceded by: Kim Beazley
- Succeeded by: Tony Abbott

Minister for Industrial Relations
- In office 11 March 1996 – 18 July 1997
- Prime Minister: John Howard
- Preceded by: Laurie Brereton
- Succeeded by: Himself (Minister for Employment and Workplace Relations)

Manager of Opposition Business
- In office 31 January 1995 – 11 March 1996
- Leader: John Howard
- Preceded by: John Howard
- Succeeded by: Simon Crean

Deputy Leader of the Liberal Party Deputy Leader of the Opposition
- In office 3 April 1990 – 23 March 1993
- Leader: John Hewson
- Preceded by: Fred Chaney
- Succeeded by: Michael Wooldridge

Member of the Australian Parliament for Flinders
- In office 1 December 1984 – 8 October 2001
- Preceded by: Bob Chynoweth
- Succeeded by: Greg Hunt
- In office 4 December 1982 – 5 March 1983
- Preceded by: Phillip Lynch
- Succeeded by: Bob Chynoweth

Personal details
- Born: Peter Keaston Reith; 15 July 1950 Melbourne, Victoria, Australia
- Died: 8 November 2022 (aged 72) Melbourne, Australia
- Party: Liberal
- Education: Monash University
- Profession: Lawyer; Politician

Peter Keaston Reith AM (15 July 1950 – 8 November 2022) was an Australian politician who served in the House of Representatives from 1982 to 1983 and from 1984 to 2001, representing the Liberal Party. He was the party's deputy leader from 1990 to 1993, and served as a minister in the Howard government.

Reith was born in Melbourne and studied law at Monash University. He settled in Cowes, Victoria, and served on the Phillip Island Shire Council from 1976 to 1981 (including as shire president for a period). Reith was elected to parliament at the 1982 Flinders by-election. He lost his seat at the 1983 federal election, but won it back the following year. In 1990, Reith was elected deputy leader of the Liberal Party under John Hewson. He was replaced by Michael Wooldridge after the 1993 election. In the Howard government, Reith served as Minister for Industrial Relations (1996–1997), Minister for Small Business (1997–2001), Minister for Employment and Workplace Relations (1998–2001), and finally Minister for Defence from January 2001 until his retirement at the 2001 election. After leaving politics, he worked as a company director and political commentator.

== Early life ==
Peter Keaston Reith was born in Melbourne on 15 July 1950. He was educated at Brighton Grammar School and at Monash University, from which he obtained bachelor's degrees in economics and law. He then practised as a solicitor first in Melbourne and then at Cowes, a small town on Phillip Island. First elected as a Councillor of the Shire of Phillip Island from 1976, he was Shire President in his last year on the Council in 1981.

While living on Phillip Island, Reith was behind the establishment of Newhaven College, an independent school on Phillip Island. He was also the key proponent for the establishment of the penguin research facility.

== Political life ==
Reith joined the Liberal Party in 1966. Representing that party, he entered the House of Representatives in December 1982 by winning a by-election for the seat of Flinders, caused by the resignation of former Deputy Liberal Leader Sir Phillip Lynch.

Reith lost the seat only three months later at the March 1983 general election. He regained the seat at the December 1984 election, which saw a substantial swing towards the Liberals (though not enough to win them government), and he continued to hold the seat for the next 17 years.

In 1991, he was technically shadow to five Treasurers. This came as a result of the ruling Labor Party having a leadership crisis that year.

Reith was Shadow Treasurer when the 1990, 1991 and 1992 Budgets were delivered and each by a different Treasurer. Except for a few months in 1993, Reith was a shadow minister from 1987 until 1996. His posts included Shadow Minister for Housing, Shadow Minister for Sport and Recreation, and then Shadow Attorney-General in 1988. In the latter capacity, he led the successful "no" campaign at the 1988 constitutional referendum.

He was also Shadow Minister for Defence and Shadow Minister for Foreign Affairs. After the defeat of the Liberal Party led by Andrew Peacock at the 1990 federal election, and Peacock's subsequent resignation from the leadership, Reith sought the leadership himself, but was defeated by John Hewson, who won by 62 votes to 13.

Following Hewson's victory Reith was then elected deputy opposition leader and appointed Shadow Treasurer, a position he held from 1990 to 1993. Along with Hewson, Reith was one of the architects of the Liberal Party's "Fightback!" policy, which included a Goods and Services Tax.

He resigned as Shadow Treasurer after the Liberals were defeated in the 1993 election. He lost the deputy Liberal leadership in the post-election ballot, and was replaced by Michael Wooldridge.

Despite the fact that Reith was the incumbent deputy leader, he had five challengers to his position, including Wooldridge, and Reith did not win enough votes to make it to the final ballot. Following the landslide victory of John Howard at the 1996 election, Reith was appointed Minister for Industrial Relations, and Leader of the House. He was one of the best-known and most influential members of Howard's cabinet. His responsibilities involved drafting and implementing the government's industrial relations policy, and he is perhaps best known for the significant productivity reforms which followed the 1998 Australian waterfront dispute. Reith's handling of the dispute, which included the failed attempt to use Australian Armed forces personnel, trained in Dubai to take over waterfront jobs and later the use of balaclava clad hired security guards with dogs, to remove working waterside workers from the work site. He strongly supported Patrick Corporation in its contest with the Maritime Union of Australia, which led to bitter opposition from the unions and the Australian Labor Party (ALP). The dispute was eventually settled in the courts with the decision going in the unions' favour and new enterprise agreements being negotiated in accordance with the court's directions.

Reith also introduced and implemented reforms to the Commonwealth public service, a significant package of reforms for small business, and an innovative employment programme for indigenous Australians.

In 1994, when in Opposition, Reith supported the idea of citizen-initiated referendums but found no support with his Coalition colleagues with National Party leader Tim Fischer describing it as a "law-making cancer".

During the campaign for the Australian republic referendum in 1999, Reith advocated for Australia becoming a republic, and favoured the idea of the president being directly elected.

In 2000, Reith was embroiled in an investigation over the use of his phone card, which had incurred charges totalling A$50,000. He admitted that about $1,000 of phone calls were the result of his son's access to the PIN associated with the card. Prior to the phone card scandal, Reith had been discussed as a possible successor to Howard.

Howard transferred Reith to the Defence portfolio in 2000. The following year, Reith announced his impending retirement, and did not contest the 2001 election. Late in the election campaign he became embroiled in the "Children Overboard affair", in which the government made claims that asylum seekers had thrown children overboard in a ploy to secure passage to Australia, and failed to correct the record when advised there was no evidence for the claims. Reith defended his actions, and made public statements about the matter in the documentary series The Howard Years, which screened in Australia in November and December 2008, in Leaky Boat in July 2011, and in the 2012 Logie Award-winning documentary, Go Back to Where You Came From. Reith was succeeded as MP for Flinders by fellow Liberal Greg Hunt, and as Minister for Defence by Senator Robert Hill.

== After leaving parliament ==
After leaving parliament, Reith had a number of part-time interests, including advising a Sydney government relations firm, Tenix, a major defence supplier and others. From 2003 to 2009 he was an executive director of the European Bank for Reconstruction and Development (based in London); in this capacity he represented Australia, the Republic of Korea, Egypt and New Zealand. While in London, Reith was also a member of an independent commission that reported to the opposition led by David Cameron on UK tax reform.

During 2011, after writing a report for the Liberal Party on the 2010 election, Reith challenged Alan Stockdale (who in the 1990s had been State Treasurer of Victoria) for the presidency of the Liberal Party. In that contest, Reith lost to Stockdale by just one vote: 56 to 57. Liberal leader Tony Abbott effectively made his vote for Stockdale public, when he was recorded on camera showing his vote to Stockdale. In 2013 Reith was Chairman of the Victorian Gas Market Review which concluded with the presentation of his report to the government led by Denis Napthine.

From 2014, Reith had been writing weekly for The Sydney Morning Herald and was a political commentator for Sky News Australia, appearing regularly on AM Agenda and The Cabinet. Reith began co-hosting a temporary format with Peter Beattie in April 2016 as a replacement for Richo while that program's host Graham Richardson was on leave to have major surgery.

In April 2016, Reith registered as a political lobbyist in South Australia. He represented two clients in that jurisdiction: Bechtel Infrastructure Australia (Pty Ltd) and G4S Custodial Services Pty Ltd.

In March 2017, Reith was hospitalised after suspected bleeding on the brain and was unable to go through with his challenge to Michael Kroger for the Liberal party presidency. Victorian Opposition Leader Matthew Guy had supported Reith challenging Kroger as he (along with many Liberal MPs) believed that branch stacking by power broker Marcus Bastiaan had gone ahead unchecked.

== Personal life and death ==
In 2015, Peter married Kerrie Reith in a small and intimate ceremony surrounded by close friends and family. The two married at The Royal Brighton Yacht Club.

Reith died from complications from Alzheimer's disease on 8 November 2022, at the age of 72 in Melbourne.

Parliament of Australia
Preceded by Phillip Lynch	Member for Flinders; 1982–1983	Succeeded by Bob Chynoweth
Preceded by Bob Chynoweth	Member for Flinders; 1984–2001	Succeeded by Greg Hunt
Political offices
Preceded by Laurie Brereton (industrial relations); David Kemp (employment); Geoff Prosser (small business)	Minister for Industrial Relations; 1996–1997	Succeeded by Tony Abbott (employment and workplace relations); Ian Macfarlane (small business)
Preceded by Laurie Brereton (industrial relations); David Kemp (employment); Geoff Prosser (small business)	Minister for Employment and Workplace; Relations and Small Business; 1997–2001	Succeeded by Tony Abbott (employment and workplace relations); Ian Macfarlane (small business)
Preceded by John Moore	Minister for Defence; 2001	Succeeded by Robert Hill
Party political offices
Preceded by Fred Chaney	Deputy Leader of the Liberal Party of Australia; 1990–1993	Succeeded by Michael Wooldridge
