= Candowie Dam =

Dam and reservoir near Melbourne, Victoria, Australia

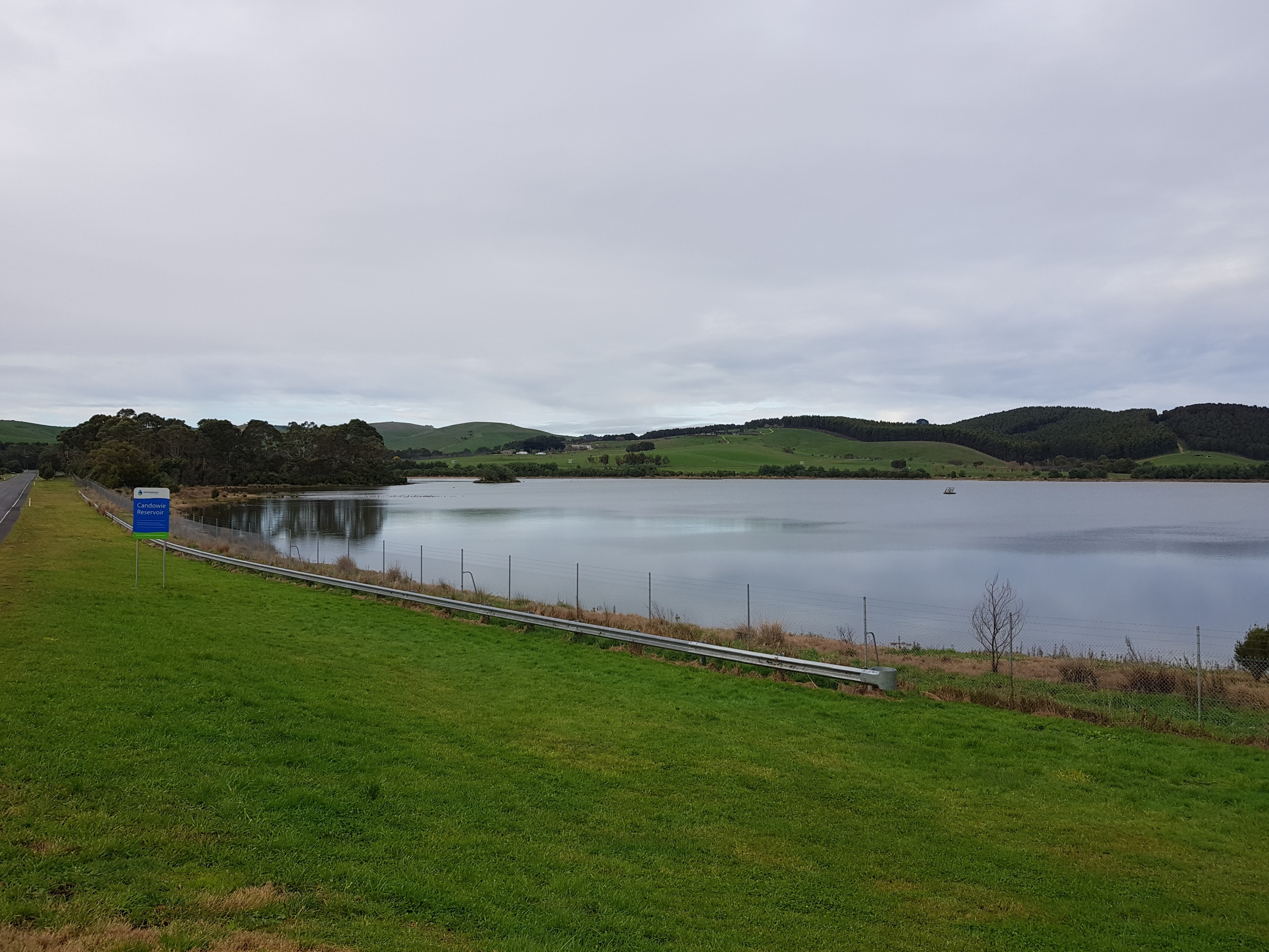
- The reservoir in 2021

- Location of the dam and reservoir in Victoria
- Interactive map of Candowie Dam
- Country: Australia
- Location: Greater Metropolitan Melbourne, Victoria
- Coordinates: 38°27′26″S 145°34′19″E
- Purpose: Water supply
- Status: Operational
- Opening date: 1963
- Built by: McDonald Construction; Thiess
- Operator: Westernport Water

Dam and spillways
- Type of dam: Embankment dam
- Impounds: Tennant Creek; Off-stream
- Height (foundation): 17 m (56 ft)
- Length: 160 m (520 ft)
- Dam volume: 41×10^{3} m^{3} (1.4×10^{6} cu ft)

Reservoir
- Creates: Candowie Reservoir
- Total capacity: 4,463 ML (3,618 acre⋅ft)
- Normal elevation: 59 m (194 ft)
- Website westernportwater.com.au

The Candowie Dam is an embankment dam across Tennant Creek, located in Almurta, a small settlement approximately 105 kilometres (65 mi) southeast of the Melbourne central business district, in Victoria, Australia. Completed in 1963, the resultant reservoir, the Candowie Reservoir, was established to supply potable water to the area, and is the main source of water for Phillip Island.

The dam and reservoir are co-located with a water treatment plant and they are the only dam operated by Westernport Water.

== Dam and reservoir overview ==
Tennent Creek is the main supply for the Candowie Reservoir, with additional pumped supply from the Bass River, a pipe connection to Cardinia Reservoir, and boreholes in Corinella, via the Corinella Aquifer.

The earth- and rock-filled dam wall is 17 metres (56 ft) high and 160 metres (520 ft) long. When full, the resultant reservoir has a storage capacity of 4,463 megalitres (3,618 acre⋅ft) and covers 55 hectares (140 acres). The uncontrolled spillway has a discharge capacity of 131 cubic metres per second (4,600 cu ft/s).

At the time of the dam's construction in 1963, the capacity of the reservoir was 1,037 megalitres (841 acre⋅ft). In 1978, the spillway was raised 1.68 metres (5 ft 6 in) and the parapet wall was raised by 1.7 metres (5 ft 7 in), with a resultant increase in capacity to 1,761 megalitres (1,428 acre⋅ft). The spillway was raised another 0.8 metres (2 ft 7 in) in 1982, with a resultant increase in capacity to 2,263 megalitres (1,835 acre⋅ft) Following a two-year drought period in 2006–2007 where storage levels dipped to just 7 per cent of capacity, further works were completed in 2013 to increase the reservoir's storage capacity to its current levels.

== See also ==
- List of reservoirs and dams in Victoria
