= Shire of Phillip Island =

Coordinates: 38°27′S 145°15′E

Shire of Phillip Island Victoria
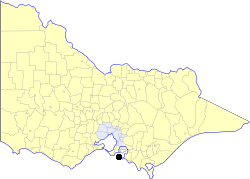
- Location in Victoria
- The Shire of Phillip Island as at its dissolution in 1994
- Population: 5,330 (1992)
  - Density: 52.75/km^{2} (136.61/sq mi)
- Established: 1928
- Area: 101.05 km^{2} (39.0 sq mi)
- Council seat: Cowes
- Region: South Gippsland
- County: Mornington
LGAs around Shire of Phillip Island:
| Western Port | French Island (uninc.) | Western Port |
| Western Port | Shire of Phillip Island | Bass |
| Bass Strait | Bass Strait | Bass Strait |

The Shire of Phillip Island was a local government area in Western Port Bay, about 120 kilometres (75 mi) south of Melbourne, the state capital of Victoria, Australia. The shire covered an area of 101.05 square kilometres (39.0 sq mi), and existed from 1928 until 1994.

== History ==
Phillip Island was initially incorporated as part of the Phillip Island Road District on 8 September 1871, which was, however, based on the mainland. This district became the Shire of Phillip Island and Woolamai on 24 December 1874. A severance movement was successful in creating a separate Shire of Phillip Island on 18 September 1928, with the remainder ultimately becoming the Shire of Bass.

On 2 December 1994, the Shire of Phillip Island was abolished, and along with the Borough of Wonthaggi and the Shire of Bass, and parts of the City of Cranbourne and the Shires of Korumburra and Woorayl, was merged into the newly created Bass Coast Shire.

=== Ridings ===
The Shire of Phillip Island had nine councillors, each of whom represented the entire shire.

== Towns and localities ==
- Cape Woolamai
- Churchill Island
- Cowes*
- Newhaven
- Rhyll
- Silverleaves
- Smiths Beach
- Summerlands
- Sunderland Bay
- Surf Beach
- Ventnor
- Wimbledon Heights

* Council seat.

== Population ==
| Year | Population |
|---|---|
| 1954 | 1,231 |
| 1958 | 1,580* |
| 1961 | 1,241 |
| 1966 | 1,413 |
| 1971 | 1,711 |
| 1976 | 2,273 |
| 1981 | 2,832 |
| 1986 | 4,101 |
| 1991 | 4,994 |

* Estimate in the 1958 Victorian Year Book.
