= A420 =

A420 may refer to:

- A420 road (England)
- Bass Highway (Victoria), a highway in Australia
