= Bass Highway (Victoria) =

Highway in Victoria, Australia

Bass Highway Victoria
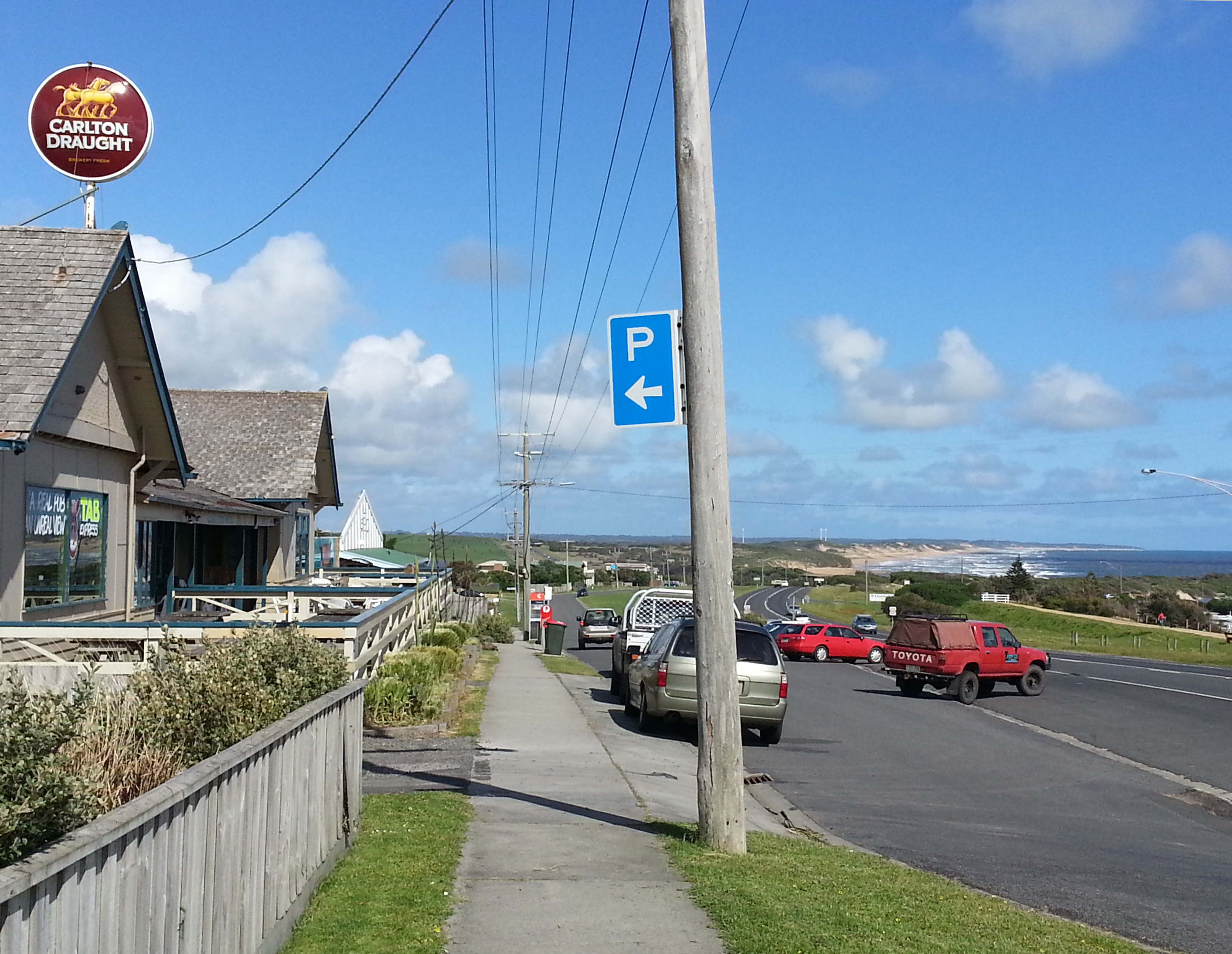
- Bass Highway as it passes through Kilcunda
- Coordinates: 38.289705°S 145.545752°E (West end); 38.476332°S 145.946237°E (East end)

General information
- Type: Highway
- Length: 86.4 km (54 mi)
- Gazetted: November 1913 (as Main Road); 1947/48 (as State Highway)
- Route number(s): M420 (1998–present) (Lang Lang–Bass); B460 (1998–present) (Bass–Leongatha)
- Former route number: A420 (1998–2013) (Grantville–Anderson); State Route 181 (1986–1998) Entire route

Major junctions
- West end: South Gippsland Highway; Lang Lang, Victoria
- Phillip Island Road; South Gippsland Highway
- East end: Strzelecki Highway; Leongatha, Victoria

Location(s)
- Major settlements: Grantville, Kilcunda, Wonthaggi, Inverloch

Highway system
- Highways in Australia; National Highway • Freeways in Australia; Highways in Victoria

The Bass Highway is an 87 kilometre highway in Victoria, Australia, running along the coasts of Western Port and Bass Strait, between Lang Lang and Leongatha via Wonthaggi. A good portion of the highway serves as a gateway from Melbourne to Phillip Island. It was named due to its proximity to Bass Strait.

== Route ==
Bass Highway commences at the interchange with South Gippsland Highway at Lang Lang and heads in a southerly direction as a four-lane, dual-carriageway road along the eastern coast of Western Port Bay, through Grantville, to the turn-off to Phillip Island) at Bass. Bass Highway then narrows to a two-lane, single carriageway semi-rural highway, continuing in a south and then south-easterly direction along the Bass Strait coast through Wonthaggi to Inverloch, before turning north-easterly to eventually terminate at the intersection with South Gippsland Highway and Strzelecki Highway at Leongatha.

== History ==
The passing of the Country Roads Act 1912 through the Parliament of Victoria provided for the establishment of the Country Roads Board (later VicRoads) and their ability to declare Main Roads, taking responsibility for the management, construction and care of the state's major roads from local municipalities. Inverloch-Leongatha Road from Inverloch to Leongatha, and Inverloch-Wonthaggi Road from Inverloch to Wonthaggi, were declared Main Roads on 10 November 1913, (Main) Coast Road from Lang Lang to Anderson (and continuing west to San Remo), was declared a Main Road on 7 September 1914, and Dalyston-Wonthaggi Road from Dalyston to Wonthaggi was declared a Main Road on 25 August 1919.

The passing of the Highways and Vehicles Act 1924 through the Parliament of Victoria provided for the declaration of State Highways, roads two-thirds financed by the state government through the Country Roads Board. Bass Highway was declared a State Highway in the 1947/48 financial year, from South Gippsland Highway near Nyora via Anderson and Dalyston to Wonthaggi (for a total of 30 miles), subsuming the original declarations of (Main) Coast Road and Dalyston-Wonthaggi Road as Main Roads; before this declaration, the roads were also referred to as Anderson–Dalyston Road. In the 1959/60 financial year, its eastern end was extended from Wonthaggi to Inverloch, subsuming the original declaration of Inverloch-Wonthaggi Road as a Main Road. The passing of the Transport Act 1983 updated the definition of State Highways; the highway was extended east one last time from Inverloch to Leongatha in December 1990, subsuming the original declaration of Inverloch-Leongatha Road as a Main Road and completing its present-day alignment at this stage.

Bass Highway was signed as State Route 181 between Lang Lang and Wonthaggi in 1986, later extended with the road to Leongatha in 1990. With Victoria's conversion to the newer alphanumeric system in the late 1990s, this was replaced by route M420 between Lang Lang and Grantville, A420 between Grantville and the Phillip Island turn-off at Anderson, and B460 between Anderson and Leongatha. A duplication project improving the quality of the road upgraded the A420 allocation to M420 in 2013, now running the entire way between Lang Lang and a new link road to Phillip Island in south-western Bass.

The passing of the Road Management Act 2004 granted the responsibility of overall management and development of Victoria's major arterial roads to VicRoads: in 2004, VicRoads re-declared the road as Bass Highway (Arterial #6710) between South Gippsland Highway in Lang Lang and Leongatha.

=== Duplication towards Phillip Island ===
A project to duplicate Bass Highway from Lang Lang to Bass (east of Phillip Island) commenced in the late 1990s, addressing the high traffic demand of the route and recent crash history. It was constructed in seven stages, with Stage 7 of the project from Woolmer Road to Phillip Island Road completed in 2013.

The benefits of this project include:

- reduced travel times to Phillip Island which hosts some of Victoria's favourite tourist and sporting attractions
- eliminating use of the roundabout at Anderson, and providing a direct route between Melbourne and Phillip Island
- bypassing a winding section of Phillip Island Road and providing two added lanes along Bass Highway. This will help address the crash history in this area. There have been 13 crashes in a recent five-year period.
- an overpass, which will be constructed near Netherwood will provide smoother and safer movements at the connection of the Bass Highway and the new link road, for Phillip Island and Wonthaggi-bound traffic
- helping traffic to exit Phillip Island after major events such as the MotoGP

The project was completed in 2013.

== Major intersections ==
LGA	Location	km	mi	Destinations	Notes
Cardinia	Lang Lang	0.0	0.0	South Gippsland Highway (M420 north, A440 east) – Dandenong, Melbourne, Leongatha	Combined partial Y interchange and at-grade intersection for complete access Western terminus of highway, route M420 continues north along South Gippsland Highway
Bass Coast	The Gurdies	9.9	6.2	Gurdies–St Helier Road – Woodleigh	
Bass Coast	Grantville	15.0	9.3	Grantville–Glen Alvie Road (east) – Grantville; Pier Road (west) – Kernot, Almurta	Traffic light intersection
Bass Coast	Corinella–Glen Forbes boundary	19.1	11.9	Corinella Road (C436 west) – Corinella, Coronet Bay; Glen Forbes Road (east) – Glen Forbes	
Bass Coast	Bass	28.8	17.9	Phillip Island Road (B420) – Phillip Island	Partial Y interchange: south-westbound exit and north-eastbound entrance only Southern terminus of route M420, northern terminus of route B460
Bass Coast	Anderson	31.0	19.3	Old Phillip Island Road (C439) – Phillip Island	Roundabout
Bass Coast	Wonthaggi	47.9	29.8	Korumburra Road (C437) – Kongwak, Korumburra	
Bass Coast	Wonthaggi	48.3	30.0	Graham Street (west), to Cape Paterson Road (C435) – Cape Paterson; McKenzie Street (south) – Wonthaggi	Roundabout
Bass Coast	Inverloch	59.9	37.2	Korumburra–Inverloch Road (C441) – Korumburra, Inverloch	
Bass Coast	Inverloch	60.9	37.8	Williams Street (C435 south) – Inverloch, Cape Paterson; Inverloch–Venus Bay Road (C442 east) – Venus Bay	Roundabout
South Gippsland	Leongatha	86.4	53.7	South Gippsland Highway (A440 southeast, northwest) – Melbourne, Foster	Roundabout
South Gippsland	Leongatha	86.4	53.7	Strzelecki Highway (B460) – Morwell	Eastern terminus of highway, route B460 continues east along Strzelecki Highway
1.000 mi = 1.609 km; 1.000 km = 0.621 mi: Incomplete access; Route transition

== See also ==
- Highways in Australia
- Highways in Victoria
