= Borough of Wonthaggi =

Former local government area in Victoria, Australia

Coordinates: 38°37′S 145°32′E

Borough of Wonthaggi Victoria
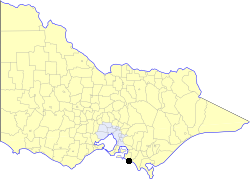
- Location in Victoria
- The Borough of Wonthaggi as at its dissolution in 1994
- Population: 6,920 (1992)
  - Density: 121.42/km^{2} (314.49/sq mi)
- Established: 1911
- Area: 56.99 km^{2} (22.0 sq mi)
- Council seat: Wonthaggi
- Region: South Gippsland
- County: Mornington, Buln Buln
LGAs around Borough of Wonthaggi:
	Bass
Bass	Borough of Wonthaggi	Woorayl
Bass Strait

The Borough of Wonthaggi was a local government area about 120 kilometres (75 mi) south-southeast of Melbourne, the state capital of Victoria, Australia. The borough covered an area of 56.99 square kilometres (22.0 sq mi), and existed from 1911 until 1994. Unlike many local government areas, it was constituted under its own Act of Parliament, rather than the Local Government Act.

== History ==
Wonthaggi was constituted under the Wonthaggi Borough Act 1910, by the Government of Victoria on 26 January 1911. The Local Government Act 1903 stipulated that boroughs could not exceed 23 square kilometres (9 sq mi) in size, and that the longest straight-line distance between boundaries could not exceed 9.6 kilometres (6.0 mi) – neither was true of Wonthaggi. However, it did meet the stipulation of a minimum of 500 householders, and a minimum rate revenue of £300.

The borough was subdivided into wards in 1924, and again in 1975. In 1977, it absorbed North Wonthaggi from the Shire of Bass, and in August 1978, the ward system was abolished, after which all nine councillors represented the entire borough.

On 2 December 1994, the Borough of Wonthaggi was abolished, and along with the Shires of Bass and Phillip Island, and parts of the City of Cranbourne and the Shires of Korumburra and Woorayl, was merged into the newly created Bass Coast Shire.

== Towns and localities ==
=== Towns ===
- Cape Paterson
- Wonthaggi*

=== Suburbs ===
- Harmers Haven
- North Wonthaggi
- South Dudley

* Council seat.

== Population ==
Year	Population
1954	4,461
1958	4,560*
1961	4,190
1966	4,022
1971	3,825
1976	4,021
1981	5,165
1986	5,931
1991	6,446

* Estimate in the 1958 Victorian Year Book.
