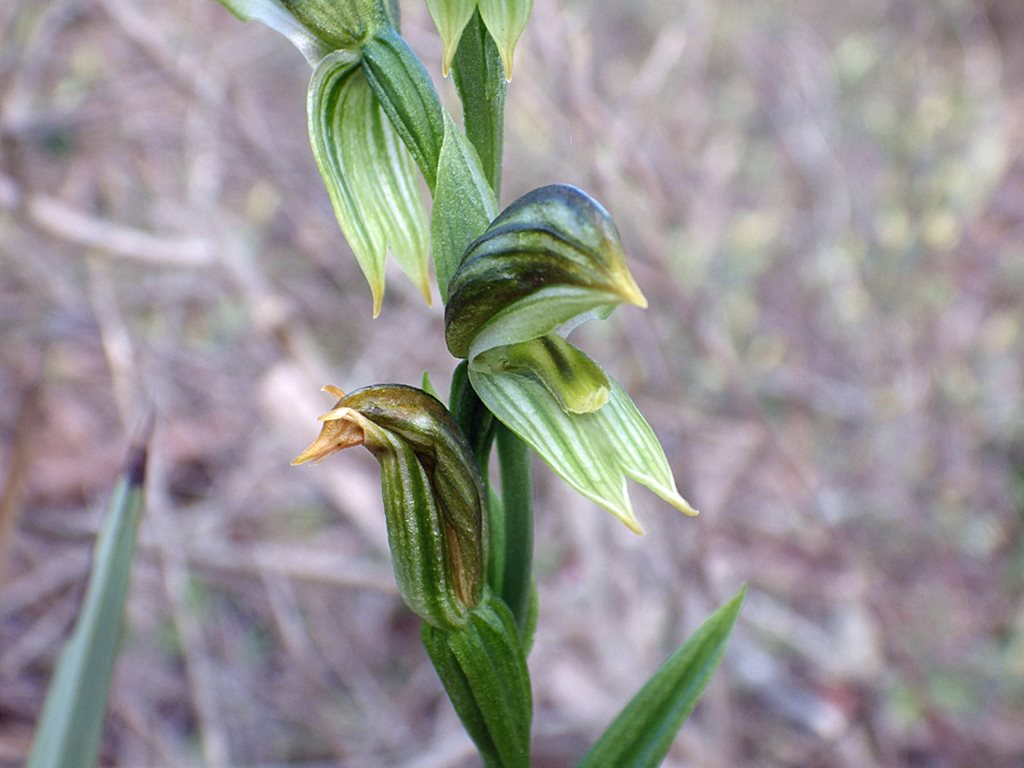
- Pterostylis chlorogramma in the northern Grampians

Conservation status
- Vulnerable (EPBC Act)

Scientific classification
- Kingdom: Plantae
- Clade: Tracheophytes
- Clade: Angiosperms
- Clade: Monocots
- Order: Asparagales
- Family: Orchidaceae
- Subfamily: Orchidoideae
- Tribe: Cranichideae
- Genus: Pterostylis
- Species: P. chlorogramma

Binomial name
- Pterostylis chlorogramma D.L.Jones & M.A.Clem.

Synonyms
- Bunochilus chlorogrammus (D.L.Jones & M.A.Clem.) D.L.Jones & M.A.Clem.

= Pterostylis chlorogramma =

Green-striped leafy greenhood

Species of orchid

Pterostylis chlorogramma, commonly known as the green-striped leafy greenhood, is a plant in the orchid family Orchidaceae and is endemic to Victoria. Flowering plants have up to seven translucent green flowers with darker green stripes. The flowers have a green labellum with a darker stripe down the middle. Non-flowering plants have a rosette of leaves on a short, thin stalk but flowering plants lack the rosette, instead having five to seven stem leaves.

== Description ==
Pterostylis chlorogramma, is a terrestrial, perennial, deciduous, herb with an underground tuber. Non-flowering plants have a rosette of between three and six lance-shaped to narrow egg-shaped leaves, each leaf 10–23 mm (0.4–0.9 in) long and 3–5 mm (0.1–0.2 in) wide on a thin stalk 2–7 mm (0.08–0.3 in) long. Flowering plants have up to seven translucent green flowers with darker green stripes on a flowering spike 200–450 mm (8–20 in) high. The flowers are 15–18 mm (0.6–0.7 in) long and 7–9 mm (0.3–0.4 in) wide. The flowering spike has between five and nine linear to lance-shaped stem leaves. The dorsal sepal and petals are fused, forming a hood or "galea" over the column with the dorsal sepal having a short point on its tip. The lateral sepals turn downwards, 13–16 mm (0.5–0.6 in) long, 6–7 mm (0.2–0.3 in) wide, joined for part of their length and suddenly narrow to thin points 4–5 mm (0.16–0.20 in). The labellum is about 7 mm (0.3 in) long, 3 mm (0.1 in) wide, pale green with a dark geen stripe along its centre and a dark green mound on the top end. Flowering occurs from July to September.

== Taxonomy and naming ==
Pterostylis chlorogramma was first formally described in 1993 by David Jones and Mark Clements and the description was published in Muelleria from a specimen collected near Grantville. The specific epithet (chlorogramma) refers to the green stripes on the flowers.

== Distribution and habitat ==
The green-striped leafy greenhood grows in heathy and shrubby forests near the Victorian coast between Yarram and Edenhope. There is some doubt about its distribution because of confusion with similar species of greenhood.

== Conservation ==
Pterostylis chlorogramma is listed as "vulnerable" under the Australian Government Environment Protection and Biodiversity Conservation Act 1999 and as "threatened" under the Victorian Government Flora and Fauna Guarantee Act 1988. Threats to the species include weed invasion, grazing by rabbits and macropods, and by tampling by people, during road maintenance and by trail bike activity.
