= Phillip Island Bridge =

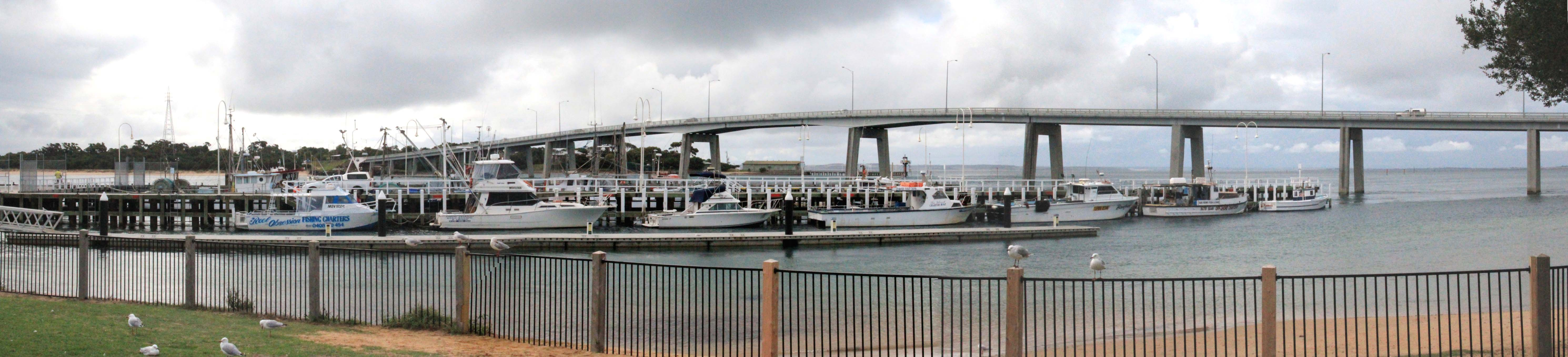
- Panorama of Phillip Island Bridge
- Coordinates: 38°31′07″S 145°21′52″E
- Carries: Phillip Island Road
- Crosses: Western Port
- Locale: Phillip Island, Victoria, Australia
- Begins: San Remo
- Ends: Newhaven
- Owner: VicRoads

Characteristics
- Material: Concrete
- Total length: 640 metres (2,100 ft)
- Longest span: 61 metres
- No. of spans: 19
- No. of lanes: 2

History
- Constructed by: John Holland
- Opened: 21 November 1969

Phillip Island Bridge is a cantilever bridge in Victoria, Australia, that connects the Australian mainland with Phillip Island.

== History ==
On 29 November 1940, a suspension bridge opened between San Remo, Victoria on the mainland to Newhaven, Victoria on Phillip Island. The 540 metre bridge had two lanes but no footpaths, instead having six pedestrian refuges. The main span was 168 metres long. The cables had previously been used on a bridge on Sydney's North Shore. Because of weight restrictions, tourist coaches had to offload their passengers.

In April 1966, a contract was awarded to John Holland for a replacement bridge made from reinforced concrete. It opened on 21 November 1969.

== See also ==
- Phillip Island
- San Remo
- Phillip Island Road
