= Newhaven College =

Independent, co-educational non-denominational school in Newhaven, Australia

Location
- 1770 Phillip Island Road, Phillip Island; Victoria, 3923; Australia; 38°29′19″S 145°16′05″E

Information
- Type: Independent, co-educational, day
- Motto: In quietness and confidence shall be your strength (Isaiah 30:15)
- Established: 1980
- Principal: Tony Corr
- Chaplain: Andre Whitton
- Grades: P–12
- Enrolment: ~900
- Colours: Light blue; navy blue; burgundy
- Website: www.newhavencol.vic.edu.au

Newhaven College is a non-denominational, co-educational, independent school situated on Phillip Island, in Victoria, Australia. Newhaven College is located at 1770 Phillip Island Road, Phillip Island. The school opened its doors in 1980 at the 'Boys Home Road' Newhaven Campus and completed the move to the 82-acre campus on Phillip Island Road, Rhyll in December 2017.

The College accommodates students from Prep to Year 12, with over 900 students enrolled in 2024. Principal Tony Corr leads the school, alongside Brett Torstonson (Head of Senior School), Ralph Arceo (Head of Middle School) and Cath Huther (Head of Junior School). In 1999, the Junior School opened at the Newhaven Campus with the introduction of a combined class of Year 5 and Year 6. The Year 9 Learning Centre opened in 2005. The Prep-Year 6 classes relocated to the Phillip Island Road Campus in 2011 followed by Years 7 and 8 in 2014. Finally, the Year 10-12 classes commenced at the new campus in 2018.

The school has four Houses: McHaffie, Sambell, Bass and Clarke. Controversy about the role each namesake played in colonialism (particularly that of George Bass) has brought a degree of negative attention to the school.

Newhaven College is a member of the South Eastern Independent Schools Association (SEISA) and the Victorian Ecumenical System of Schools (VESS).

== Controversies ==
=== Child Safety ===
In the late 2010s and early 2020s, Newhaven College faced scrutiny related to child safety after allegations of abuse were made against a former staff member, Kirk Skinner, who served as a music teacher and department head. Skinner pleaded guilty to child sexual offences but passed away before sentencing. The case prompted an investigation by the Victorian schools regulator into the school’s compliance with child safety standards.

== Principals ==
There have been a total of five Principals of Newhaven College since the schools foundation in 1980. The current Principal is Tony Corr since 2021.

Principals of Newhaven College
Years served	Name
1980–1990	Frank Moore
1990–1998	David O’Regan
1998–2011	Michael Brewin
2011–2021	Gea Lovell
2021–present	Tony Corr

== Scholarships ==
Each year Newhaven College offers scholarships to students in the following categories: academic, sport, performing arts, leadership and community involvement. Awarded to Year 7-12 students who are able to demonstrate outstanding abilities in one or more of these areas.

== Arts, Drama and Music ==
Newhaven College has a strong focus on the arts, with yearly school musical and drama productions, one-on-one music lessons, media and extensive creative arts. In 2022, the new Performing Arts Wing was completed, including music lesson rooms, Technology Suite for music editing and composition, a Black Box Theatre, large Rehearsal Hall plus box office for catering and ticket sales. Director of Music, Matt Goss, oversees performing arts at the school, with 12 music tutors and teachers providing individual music tuition and class lessons. The College also has state-of-the-art visual arts, food technology and trade centre facilities.

== Sports ==
Newhaven College provides for a wide range of sports interests and takes part in SEISA sport each year. The multi-purpose gym allows for most sports to be played all year round. The outdoor tennis courts, basketball/netball courts, plus playing fields for soccer, hockey and AFL football. The school encourages all students to participate in physical activity through PE classes and extracurricular involvement. Newhaven College participates in the SEISA sports program all year round, hosting other schools at their broad range of facilities.

== Notable alumni ==
- Liam Hemsworth - Australian actor
- Drew Ginn - former Australian rower
