= Samuel Anderson (Australian settler) =

- Born: 25 September 1803; Kirkcudbright, Kirkcudbrightshire, Scotland
- Died: 1863 (aged 59–60); San Remo, Victoria, Australia
- Occupation(s): agriculturist and explorer
- Known for: early settler of Victoria, Australia

Samuel Anderson (1803–1863), agriculturist and explorer, was an early settler of Tasmania and Victoria, Australia.

Anderson was born in Kirkcudbright, Scotland, and attended the Kirkcudbright Academy. He emigrated to Van Diemens Land and in 1835 established the third permanent European settlement in Victoria at Bass on Western Port with his brothers Hugh and later Thomas. Anderson had arrived in Hobart aboard the "Lang" in September 1830 and was employed as bookkeeper for Van Diemen's Land Company at Circular Head Tasmania. In 1835 he left the company and sailed to Westernport. It has been suggested that the sloop Rebecca was purchased by Samuel and his partner/s. In 1837 his soon to be partner Robert Massie also left VDL Co and joined Samuel at Westernport where his skills as an engineer produced a tidal-powered mill.(Primary evidence of this claim appears to be nil). The Massie Anderson partnership appears to have wound up in July 1843 following an auction selling off all assets to repay creditors. Massie moved on in 1843 it appears and married in 1845 and moved to Taraville. Samuel's Brothers Hugh and Thomas followed him to Bass with Hugh taking up a farm and the Carome Mill at Darebin Creek and when land was released they bought over 2000 acres centred on the Anderson area today with their homestead "Netherwood" being built on the shores of Westernport. The Anderson brothers and their descendants featured prominently in the local municipal area.

Anderson Inlet and the locality of Anderson, near Inverloch, are named after his family.
