= Bass River (Victoria) =

River in Victoria, Australia

Bass
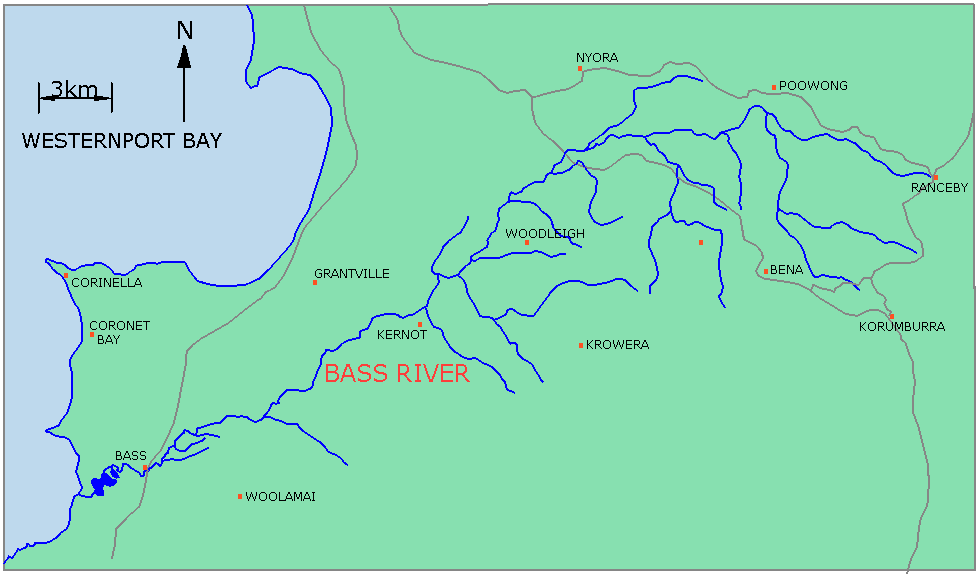
- Bass River, Victoria

- Mouth of the Bass River in Victoria
- Etymology: In honour of George Bass
- Native name: Weandon yallock (Boonwurrung); Tullungurn (Boonwurrung)

Location
- Country: Australia
- State: Victoria
- Region: South East Coastal Plain (IBRA), West Gippsland
- Local government area: Bass Coast Shire

Physical characteristics
- Source: Strzelecki Ranges
  - location: below Woodleigh
  - coordinates: 38°22′27″S 145°39′29″E
  - elevation: 60 m (200 ft)
- Mouth: Western Port
  - location: west of Bass
  - coordinates: 38°29′46″S 145°25′54″E
  - elevation: 0 m (0 ft)
- Length: 59 km (37 mi)
- Discharge
  - location: mouth

Basin features
- River system: Western Port catchment
- Tributaries
  - left: Wattle Creek

The Bass River, a perennial river of the Western Port catchment, is located in the West Gippsland region of the Australian state of Victoria.

== Location and features ==
The Bass River rises below the locale of Woodleigh, west of the South Gippsland Highway, with its headwaters drawn from the Strzelecki Ranges, north of the town of Korumburra. The river flows generally south by west, joined by one minor tributary, before reaching its river mouth and emptying into the Western Port, west of the town of Bass within the Bass Coast Shire. The river descends 60 metres (200 ft) over its combined 59-kilometre (37 mi) course.

The river is traversed by the Bass Highway near the town of Bass.

== Etymology ==
In the Aboriginal Boonwurrung language the river is given two names, Weandon yallock, with yallock meaning "river" or creek", and Tullungurn, with no defined meeting.

The river is now named in honour of George Bass, who came to the river and surrounding area in January 1798 on his "whaleboat" expedition of the southeast coast of Australia.

== See also ==
- List of rivers of Australia § Victoria
