= 1982 Flinders by-election =

A by-election was held for the Australian House of Representatives seat of Flinders on 4 December 1982. It was triggered by the resignation of the sitting member and former Liberal Party deputy leader, Sir Phillip Lynch. Fifteen people nominated for Liberal preselection, including Jim Short, Roger Johnston and Richard Alston. The Labor candidate, Rogan Ward, was a previous mayor of the former City of Frankston.

The by-election was won by Liberal Party candidate Peter Reith. Parliament was in session until 15 December, but Reith chose not to attend to be sworn in then. On 3 February 1983, before Parliament could meet following the by-election, the Prime Minister, Malcolm Fraser, called a double dissolution election for 5 March. Reith lost his seat but was re-elected at the December 1984 election.

Rogan Ward was the ALP candidate at the by-election but due to dissatisfaction with his candidacy was not again the candidate at the 1983 election. The successful ALP candidate was instead Bob Chynoweth. Chynoweth did not face a rematch with Reith in 1984, instead successfully transferring to the seat of Dunkley. The ALP's poor by-election performance was also seen as prompting the ALP to replace its federal leader Bill Hayden with Bob Hawke a few months later in February 1983.

Opponents of the Franklin Dam in Tasmania (which was eventually vetoed by the incoming Hawke Government in 1983) used the Flinders by-election as an informal referendum. 41% of Liberal voters wrote "No Dams" on their ballot-papers. This had no legal effect so did not invalidate their votes.

== Results ==
Flinders by-election, 1982
Party	Candidate	Votes	%	±%
Liberal	Peter Reith	34,765	45.7	−4.6
Labor	Rogan Ward	31,052	40.8	+1.6
Democrats	Harold Fraser	6,785	8.9	−1.6
Democratic Labor	Peter Ferwerda	1,271	1.7	+1.7
Deadly Serious	Paul Crossley	1,211	1.6	+1.6
Republican	Peter Consandine	607	0.8	+0.8
Australia	Gail Farrell	389	0.5	+0.5
Total formal votes		76,080	97.4	−0.7
Informal votes		1,991	2.6	+0.7
Turnout		78,071	92.1	−3.0
Two-party-preferred result
Liberal	Peter Reith	39,804	52.3	−2.3
Labor	Rogan Ward	36,276	47.7	+2.3
Liberal hold		Swing	−2.3	

== See also ==
- List of Australian federal by-elections
