= Archies Creek =

- Town
- Coordinates: 38°32′53″S 145°33′49″E
- Country: Australia
- State: Victoria
- LGA: Bass Coast Shire
- Location: 131 km (81 mi) SE of Melbourne; 10 km (6.2 mi) N of Wonthaggi

Government
  - State electorate: Bass
  - Federal division: Monash

Population
  - Total: 32 (2021 census)
- Postcode: 3995

Archies Creek is a town in Victoria, Australia. It is located between the Dalyston - Glen Forbes Road and Loch-Wonthaggi Road, on the Archies Creek Road, in the Bass Coast Shire, north-west of Wonthaggi.

Much of the development in this particular corner of South Gippsland was due to the discovery of coal at Cape Paterson in 1825–26. But it was far more than just coal which caused this area to grow. Many pioneers had realised the potential of the land and had begun clearing it to raise cattle and sheep long before coal mining began in 1859.

Early records indicate that a factory was established at Archies Creek in the late 1800s. Still, very little development actually took place in the township until after the turn of the century. In 1902, when an application was made for a hotel licence by Mrs Mary A Dixon, it appeared that the only other business in the town was the Melbourne Chilled Butter Factory. This privately owned factory was sold to the Wonthaggi Dairy Produce Company in 1903 for the sum of 800 pounds. It was run as a co-operative with local dairy farmers on the Board to control operations. It built up a world-wide reputation for quality butter and other dairy products.

The township was well established when, on 14 August 1902, a group of men met in the Royal Mail Hotel to discuss the possibility of building a public hall. Jas Dixon offered to buy the land and the local people were canvassed to raise the 200 pounds required for its construction. The Grand Ball to mark its opening occurred on 1 January 1904, with tickets admitting two ladies and one gentlemen costing 5 shillings. Dances were often held on the full moon to provide the light for the men on horses to find their way back home. As the old hall deteriorated over time a new brick hall was built in 1958. In February 1963 the first wedding of Mary and Graeme Mabin was catered for by the Ladies Committee.

The butter factory was the life blood of Archies Creek. It provided employment for over 200 people at the peak of the operations and was at the forefront of dairy factory development in Australia. It became one of the first dairy factories to transport milk in bulk tankers, starting a pilot scheme in 1957.

The Post Office, Archie's Creek, opened on 17 November 1899 and closed in 1986 The Postmaster at the time was Michael Bentick.

Archies Creek was the seat of the Shire of Bass until it amalgamated in 1994 and is now in the Bass Coast Shire.

In May 2019 the inaugural Archies Bald Portrait Prize was held at the Archies Creek Hall and curated by Liane Arno of ArtSpace. Inspired by Deb Rielly, a paramedic and cancer sufferer who died in April 2019, who suffered taunts because she refused to wear a wig or scarf when she lost her hair due to chemotherapy, the local community art gallery, ArtSpace, along with the Hall, organised a painting and sculptural exhibition in honour of the beauty of the hairless head. A sold out Biggest Morning Tea raised money for Cancer Research.
