= Lang Lang, Victoria =

Lang Lang
- Town
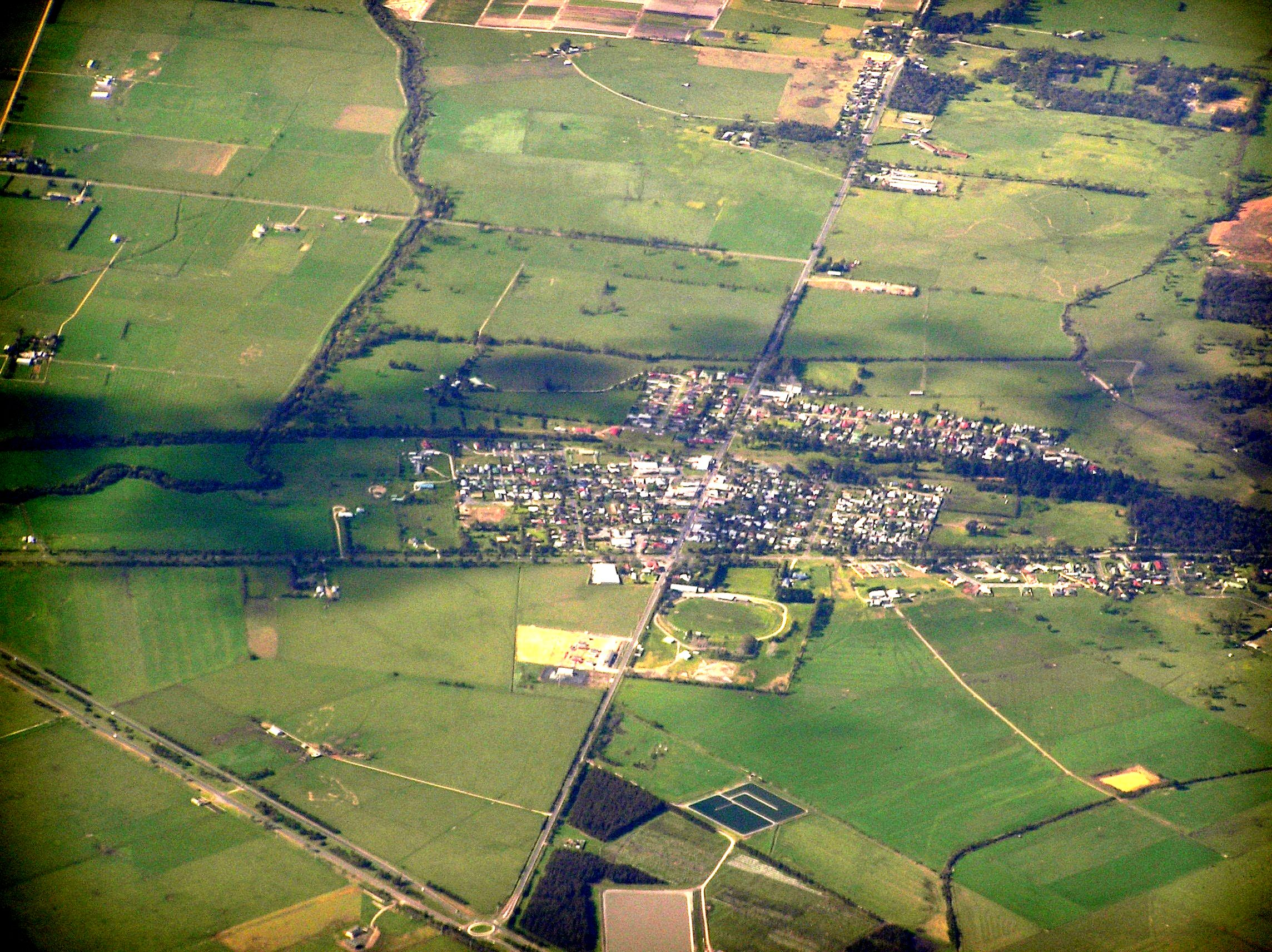

- Interactive map of Lang Lang
- Coordinates: 38°16′S 145°34′E
- Country: Australia
- State: Victoria
- LGAs: Shire of Cardinia; Bass Coast Shire; South Gippsland Shire
- Location: 73 km (45 mi) from Melbourne; 37 km (23 mi) from Cranbourne

Government
  - State electorate: Bass
  - Federal division: Monash
- Elevation: 2 m (6.6 ft)

Population
  - Total: 2,556 (2021 census)
- Postcode: 3984

Lang Lang is a town in Victoria, Australia, 73 km south-east of Melbourne's Central Business District, located within the Shires of Bass Coast, Cardinia and South Gippsland local government areas. Lang Lang recorded a population of 2,556 at the 2021 census.

The village is just off the South Gippsland Highway near its intersection with the Bass Highway, on the Lang Lang River and borders the region of Dalmore, a large asparagus growing region. Lang Lang also caters to beef, dairy farming and sand mines.

== Etymology ==
Lang Lang was formerly known as Carrington, after Lord Carrington.

The origin of the name Lang Lang is debated. In the Australian Aboriginal Woiwurrung language, the name Lang Lang, also spelled Laang Laang, meant "stones" or "stony".

An alternate explanation is that the town is named in honour of an early settler in the region, called Lang.

== Location and features ==
A Lang Lang post office opened on 20 May 1878. In 1891, after the arrival of the railway, it was renamed Lang Lang West and a new Lang Lang office was opened near the station. A post office known as Lang Lang East opened in 1885 but was replaced by Nyora in 1890, again near the station.

General Motors Holden operated the Lang Lang Vehicle Proving Ground, a vehicle development, durability testing, safety test centre and exhaust emission facility, located on the South Gippsland Highway near Lang Lang.

A rodeo has been held regularly at Lang Lang on Easter Monday since the 1940s. The town has an Australian rules football team competing in the Ellinbank & District Football League as well as a netball team. Golfers play at the course of the Lang Lang Golf Club on the South Gippsland Highway, Nyora.

== Population ==
In the 2016 Census, there were 1,585 people in Lang Lang. 84.8% of people were born in Australia and 92.9% of people spoke only English at home. The most common responses for religion were No Religion 38.2%, Anglican 20.4% and Catholic 18.6%.

== Transport ==
Lang Lang was formerly situated along the South Gippsland railway corridor that operated to its terminus at Yarram in the early 1980s and Leongatha in the mid-1990s. A V/Line road coach service replaced the rail service to Leongatha on 24 July 1993, running between Melbourne and Yarram. However, since the closure of the South Gippsland rail line by the Kennett Victorian government on 14 December 1994 (with the exception of the locally run tourist railway between Nyora and Leongatha), the South and West Gippsland Transport Group represented by the local council are campaigning for the rail services to be reinstated beyond the current terminus at Cranbourne by the 2020s.

== See also ==
- City of Cranbourne – Lang Lang was previously within this former local government area.
- Lang Lang railway station
- List of reduplicated Australian place names
