= Nyora =

- Town
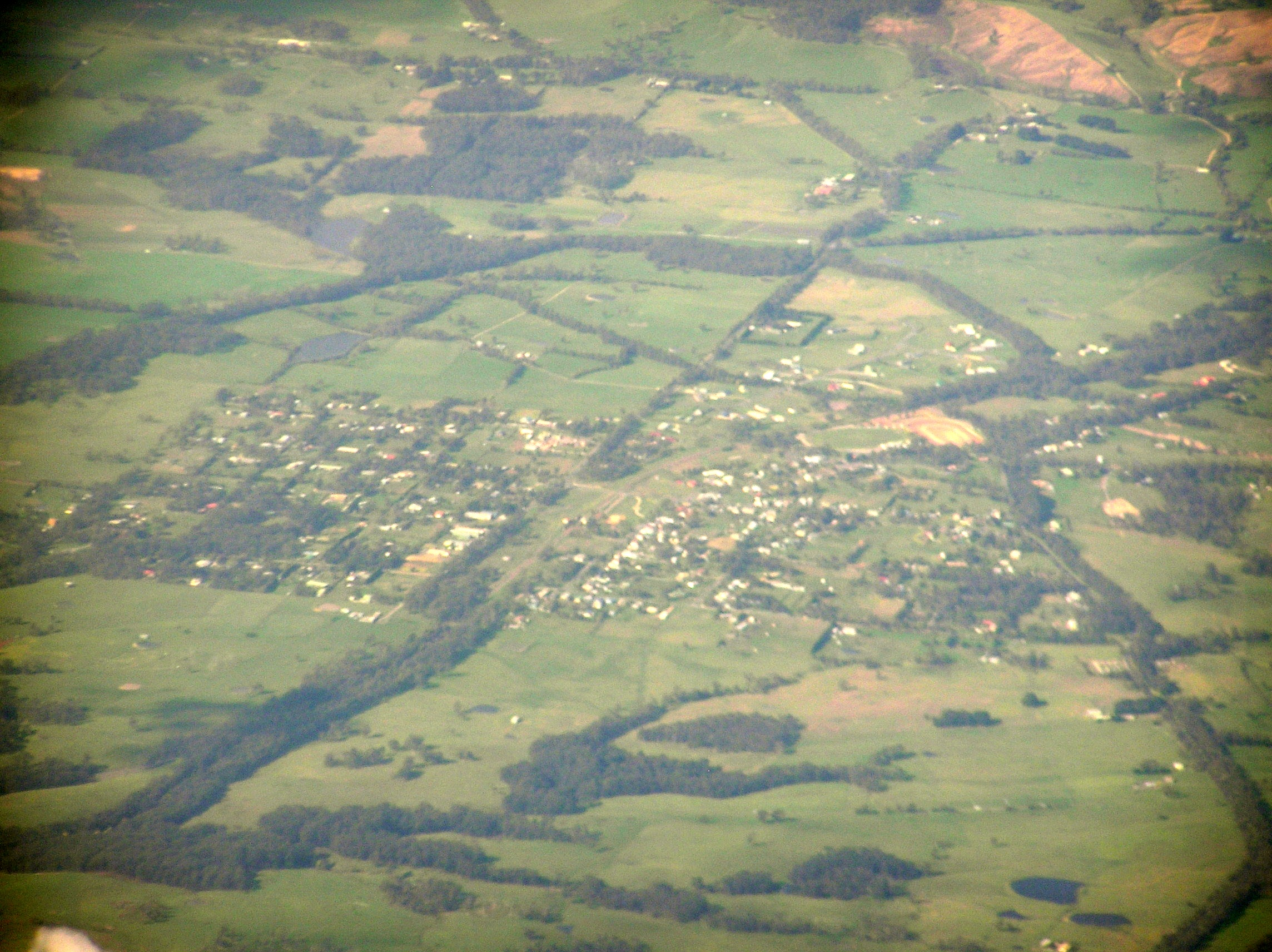
- Aerial photo from south west

- Interactive map of Nyora
- Coordinates: 38°20′S 145°40′E
- Country: Australia
- State: Victoria
- LGAs: South Gippsland Shire; Shire of Baw Baw; Shire of Cardinia
- Location: 84 km (52 mi) SE of Melbourne; 20 km (12 mi) NW of Korumburra

Government
  - State electorates: Bass; Gippsland South; Narracan
  - Federal division: Monash

Population
  - Total: 1,644 (2021 census)
- Postcode: 3987

Nyora /naɪˈjɔːrə/ is a town in South Gippsland, Victoria, Australia, approximately 84 kilometres (52 mi) south-east of Melbourne's Central Business District, located within the Shires of Baw Baw, Cardinia and South Gippsland local government areas. Nyora recorded a population of 1,644 at the 2021 census.

Nyora is 12 kilometres (7.5 mi) from Lang Lang, and 11 kilometres (6.8 mi) from the nearest beach.

== History ==
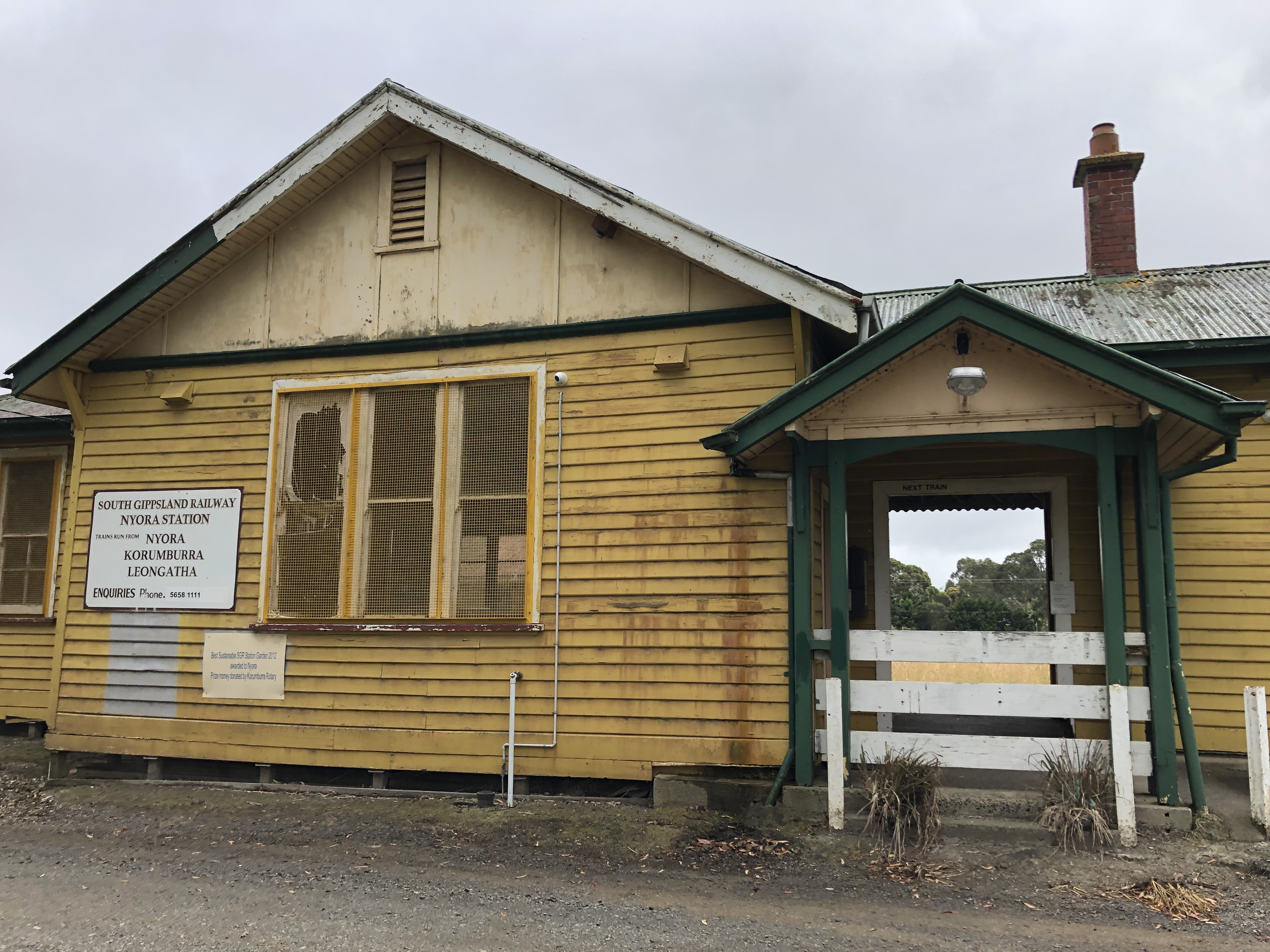
Nyora Railway Station

The Post Office opened around September 1890 replacing an office at nearby Lang Lang East open since 1885.

The town's railway station and general store were included in the popular ABC TV program Something in the Air. The township featured in the TV series was known as "Emu Springs".

== Sport and recreation ==
Golfers play at the course of the Lang Lang Golf Club on the South Gippsland Highway, Nyora.

Nyora Football / Netball Club

Nyora is home to the Nyora Football Club —nicknamed the Saints and wear red/white/black uniforms. The club was formed in 1877 and has won 11 senior premierships in this time, the first coming in 1909.

The club has had a very successful period of late, winning premierships in both 2006 and 2007 in the Ellinbank & District Football League. So successful was Nyora during this period the town was often referred to as "premiership city" and some town folks even erected a sign on the entry to the town to reflect this.

In 2018 the young Saints defeated Longwarry in a hard-fought battle, led by Dylan Helyen to again reclaim the mantle of premiership city.

== Transport ==
Nyora is home to the former V/Line railway station of the same name, which served primarily as a freight and goods transfer facility as well as the branch station for the former Leongatha, Barry Beach, Yarram and Wonthaggi lines. The railway station presently serves as part of the South Gippsland Railway — a community based heritage / tourist railway organisation, with its operations base at Korumburra. Nyora was formerly situated along the South Gippsland railway corridor that operated to its terminus at Yarram in the early 1980s and Leongatha in the mid-1990s. A V/Line road coach service replaced the rail service to Leongatha on 24 July 1993, running between Melbourne and Yarram. However, since the closure of the South Gippsland rail line with the exception of the locally run tourist railway between Nyora and Leongatha by the Kennett Victorian government on 14 December 1994, the South and West Gippsland Transport Group represented by the local council are campaigning for the rail services to be reinstated beyond the current terminus at Cranbourne by the 2020s.

== See also ==
- Shire of Korumburra – Nyora was previously within this former local government area.

== Links ==
- Nyora FNC website
- 1913 - Grantville District FA Premiers: Nyora FC team photo
