= George Bass =

British naval surgeon and explorer of Australia (1771 - c. 1803)

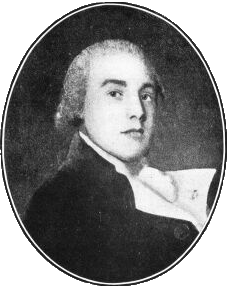
- Engraving of Bass from The Naval Pioneers of Australia by Louis Becke and Walter Jeffery, 1899
- Born: 30 January 1771; Sleaford, Lincolnshire, England
- Disappeared: 5 February 1803 (aged 32); Last seen before leaving Port Jackson, New South Wales, Australia
- Occupations: Ship's surgeon and explorer
- Spouse: Elizabeth Waterhouse

George Bass (/bæs/; 30 January 1771 – after 5 February 1803) was an English naval surgeon and explorer of Australia.

== Early life ==
Bass was born on 30 January 1771 at Aswarby, a hamlet near Sleaford, Lincolnshire, the son of a tenant farmer, George Bass, and a local beauty named Sarah (née Newman). His father died in 1777 when Bass was six. He had attended Boston Grammar School and later trained in medicine at the hospital in Boston, Lincolnshire. At the age of 18, he was accepted in London as a member of the Company of Surgeons, and in 1794 he joined the Royal Navy as a surgeon.

== Career ==
He arrived in Sydney in New South Wales on HMS Reliance on 7 September 1795.

Also on the voyage were Matthew Flinders, John Hunter, Bennelong, and his surgeon's assistant William Martin.

== The voyages of the Tom Thumb and Tom Thumb II ==
Bass had brought with him on the Reliance a small boat with an 8-foot (2.4 m) keel and 5-foot (1.5 m) beam, which he called the Tom Thumb on account of its size. In October 1795 Bass and Flinders, accompanied by William Martin sailed the Tom Thumb out of Port Jackson to Botany Bay and explored the Georges River further upstream than had been done previously by the colonists. Their reports on their return led to the settlement of Banks' Town.

In March 1796 the same party embarked on a second voyage in a larger boat, which they called the Tom Thumb II. During this trip they travelled as far down the coast as Lake Illawarra, which they called Tom Thumb Lagoon. They explored Port Hacking.

Later that year Bass discovered good land near Prospect Hill, found lost cattle brought out with the First Fleet, and failed in an attempt to cross the Blue Mountains.

== Whaleboat voyage to Western Port ==
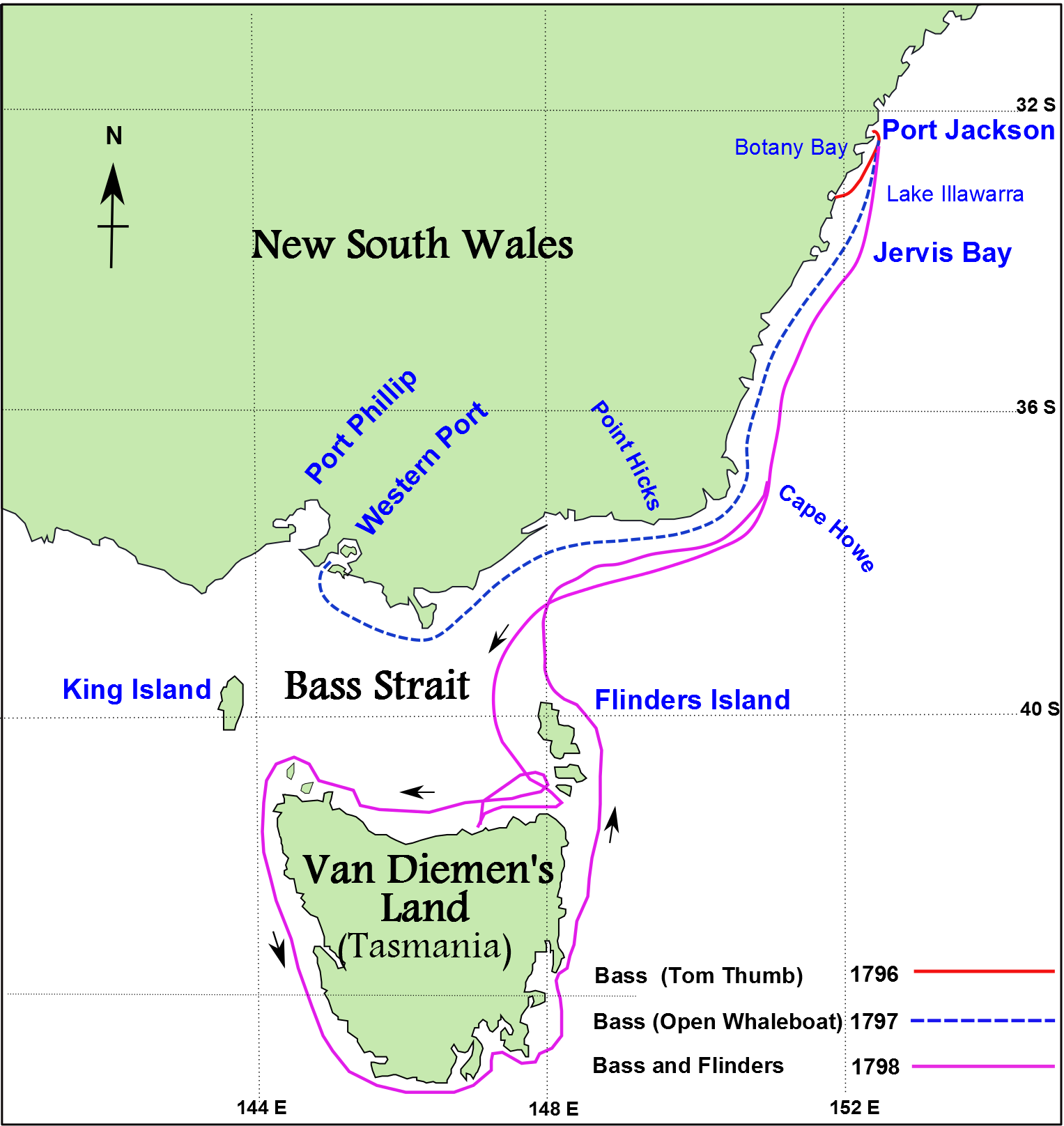
Voyages of George Bass

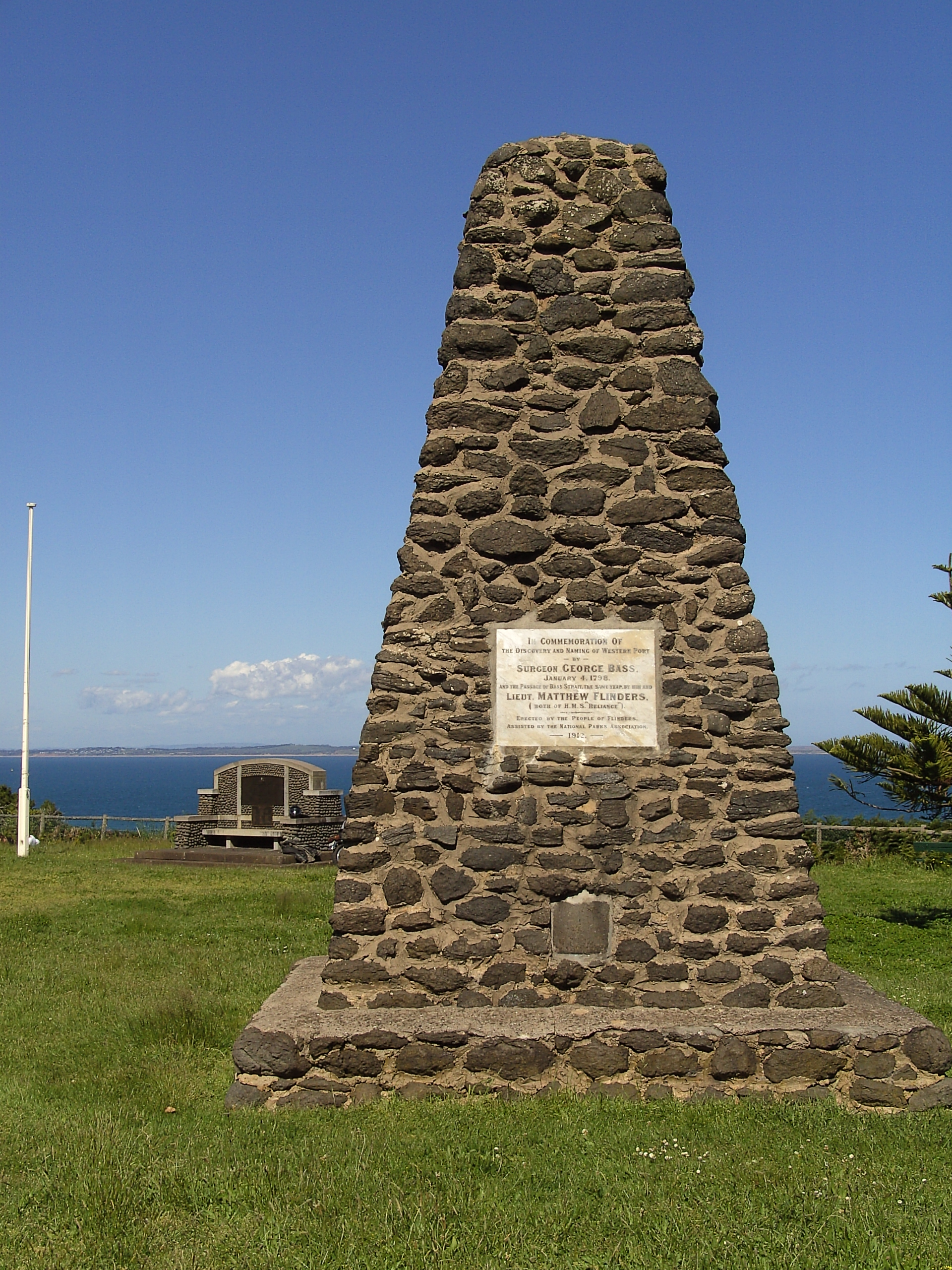
Memorial (1912) to the "discovery and naming" of Western Port on 4 January 1798, at Flinders, Victoria.

In 1797, without Flinders, in an open whaleboat with a crew of six, Bass sailed to Cape Howe, the farthest point of south-eastern Australia. From here he went westwards along what is now the coast of the Gippsland region of Victoria, to Western Port, almost as far as the entrance to Port Phillip, on the north shore of which is the site of present-day Melbourne. His belief that a strait separated the mainland from Van Diemen's Land (now Tasmania) was backed up by his astute observation of the rapid tide and the long south-western swell at Wilson's Promontory.

Bass visited the Kiama area and made many notes on its botanical complexity and the amazing natural phenomenon, the Kiama Blowhole, noting the volcanic geology around the Blowhole and contributed much to its understanding.

== Circumnavigation of Tasmania in the Norfolk ==
In 1798, this theory was confirmed when Bass and Flinders, in the sloop Norfolk, circumnavigated Van Diemen's Land. In the course of this voyage Bass visited the estuary of the Derwent River, found and named by Captain John Hayes in 1793, where the city of Hobart would be founded on the strength of his report in 1803. When the two returned to Sydney, Flinders recommended to Governor John Hunter that the passage between Van Diemen's Land and the mainland be called Bass Strait.

"This was no more than a just tribute to my worthy friend and companion," Flinders wrote, "for the extreme dangers and fatigues he had undergone, in first entering it in a whaleboat, and to the correct judgement he had formed, from various indications, of the existence of a wide opening between Van Diemen's Land and New South Wales."

Bass was an enthusiastic naturalist and botanist, and he forwarded some of his botanical discoveries to Sir Joseph Banks in London. "In this voyage of fourteen weeks I collected those few plants upon Van Diemen's Land which had not been familiar to me in New South Wales," he wrote to Banks, "and have done myself the honour of submitting them to your inspection." He was made an honorary member of the Society for Promoting Natural History, which later became the Linnean Society. Some of his observations were published in the second volume of David Collins's An Account of the English colony in New South Wales. He was one of the first to describe the Australian marsupial, the wombat.

== Marriage and trading ==
On 8 October 1800, George married Elizabeth Waterhouse at St James's Church, Westminster. She was the sister of Henry Waterhouse, Bass's former shipmate, and captain of the Reliance. In January 1801 Bass set sail again for Port Jackson, leaving Elizabeth behind, and though the couple wrote to each other, they did not meet again, as Bass never returned from this journey.

Bass and a syndicate of friends had invested some £10,000 in the copper-sheathed brig Venus, and a cargo of general goods to transport and sell in Port Jackson. Bass was the owner-manager and set sail in early 1801. (Among his influential friends and key business associates in the Antipodes was the principal surgeon of the satellite British colony on Norfolk Island, Thomas Jamison, who was subsequently appointed Surgeon-General of New South Wales.)

On passing through Bass Strait on his 1801 voyage, he recorded it simply as Bass Strait, like any other geographical feature. It seems, as Flinders' biographer Ernest Scott observed, that Bass's natural modesty meant he felt no need to say "discovered by me" or "named after me".

On arrival, Bass found the colony awash with goods and he was unable to sell his cargo. Governor King was operating on a strict programme of economy and would not take the goods into the government store, even at a 50% discount. What King did though was contract with Bass to ship salt pork from Tahiti. Food was scarce in Sydney at that time and prices were being driven up, yet pigs were plentiful in the Society Islands and King could contract with Bass at 6 pence a pound where he'd been paying a shilling (12 pence) previously. The arrangement suited King's thrift, and was profitable for Bass. With his partner Charles Bishop, Bass sailed from Sydney in the Venus for Dusky Sound in New Zealand where they spent 14 days stripping iron from the wreck of Captain Brampton's old ship the Endeavour. This was made into axes which were used to trade for the pork in Tahiti before returning with the latter to Sydney by November 1802.

In January 1803, Bass applied to King for a fishing monopoly extending from a line bisecting the lower South Island of New Zealand from Dusky Sound to Otago Harbour – now the site of the city of Dunedin – and including all the lands and seas to the south, notably the Antipodes Islands, probably on the basis of information from his brother-in-law Waterhouse, the discoverer of the Antipodes archipelago. He expected much from it, but before he heard it had been declined he sailed south from Sydney never to return. Bass and Flinders were both operating out of Sydney during these times, but their stays there did not coincide.

== Final voyage ==
What became of Bass is unknown. He set sail on his last voyage in the Venus on 5 February 1803 and he and his crew were never seen again. His plan was to go to Tahiti and perhaps on to the Spanish colonies on the coast of Chile to buy provisions and bring them back to Sydney.

It has been suspected Bass may also have planned to engage in contraband trade in Chile. Spain reserved the import of goods into her colonies for Spanish ships and Spanish merchants, but the colonists needed more than they could supply, and shortages and heavy taxation caused high prices, encouraging an extensive illegal trade with foreign vessels. Port Jackson was described by some 19th-century historians as a base for such smuggling Britain's strained relationship with Spain at that time meant British authorities were unconcerned.

Bass still had much of the general cargo he had brought to Sydney in 1801, and he may well have been tempted to take some to Chile. Two of his last letters have hints at a venture which he could not name, but in any case he set off in 1803, with a diplomatic letter from Governor King attesting his bona-fides and that his sole purpose, if he were on the West coast of South America, would be in procuring provisions.

As many months passed with no word of his arrival, Governor King and Bass's friends in Sydney were forced to accept that he had met some misfortune. In England in January 1806, Bass was listed by the Admiralty as lost at sea, and later that year Elizabeth was granted an annuity from the widows' fund, backdated to when Bass's half-pay had ended in June 1803. Bass had made the usual contributions to the fund from his salary.

== Speculation on Bass's fate ==
A good deal of speculation has taken place about Bass's fate. One story, attributed to William Campbell of the brig Harrington, has it that Bass was captured by the Spanish in Chile and sent to the silver mines. The Harrington was engaged in smuggling and returned to Sydney some three months after Bass's departure. However, this story dates from 1811 in a report by William Fitzmaurice. There are good records of Campbell in 1803, and then in 1805 when he captured a Spanish ship, but Bass is not mentioned at those times. Three months is also too short a time for Bass to reach Chile and then the Harrington to get back to Sydney.

Another factor against the South American story is that all British prisoners held by the Spanish in Chile and Peru were freed in 1808 and returned to Europe. If the crew of the Venus had indeed been captured, then none of the 25 survived.

Adventurer Jørgen Jørgensen wrote about Bass in his 1835 autobiography, claiming Bass had attempted forced trade at gunpoint in Chile, and was captured when he let his guard down. Jørgensen probably met Bass, but this account is almost certainly an invention. Jørgensen's writing, though entertaining, was often far from factual.

A search of Spanish archives in 1903 by scholar Pascual de Gayangos and a search of Peruvian archives in 2003 by historian Jorge Ortiz-Sotelo found no mention of Bass. His ultimate fate remains a mystery.

== Recognition ==
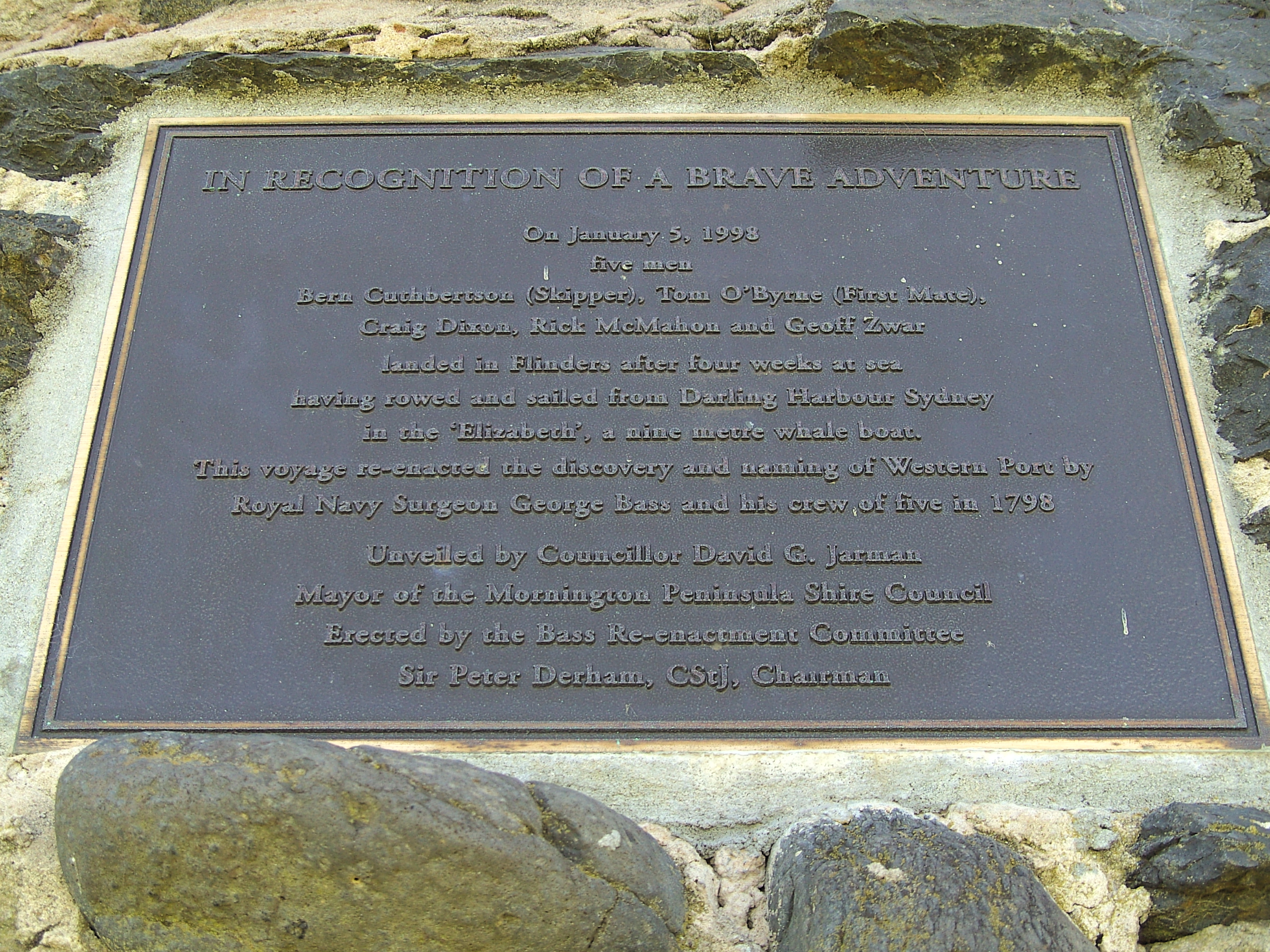
Western Port 200th anniversary of discovery re-enactment plaque.

Australia Post honoured George Bass in 1963 with a postage stamp, and again in 1998 in association with Matthew Flinders.

A re-enactment of the whaleboat voyage marked the 200th anniversary of Bass's voyage; the 9 metres (30 ft) "Elizabeth" skippered by Bern Cuthbertson arrived at Western Port on 5 January 1998. A plaque memorialising this was added to the Bass and Flinders memorial at Flinders.

The following places commemorate the name of George Bass:

- Bass Highway (Tasmania)
- Bass Highway (Victoria)
- Bass Hill, New South Wales
- Bass Point
- Bass Strait
- Bass River
- Bass, Victoria (town)
- Division of Bass, Tasmania (federal)
- Division of Bass, Tasmania (state)
- Bass and Flinders Point, Cronulla, New South Wales
- George Bass Drive, Batehaven to Moruya Airport, Batemans Bay, New South Wales
- Bass Islands (French Polynesia)

== See also ==
- List of people who disappeared mysteriously at sea

== Additional reading ==
- Bowden, Keith Macrae (1952). George Bass 1771–1803: His Discoveries, Romantic Life and Tragic Disappearance. London and Melbourne: Oxford University Press.
