= Surf Beach, Victoria =

Surf Beach
- Town
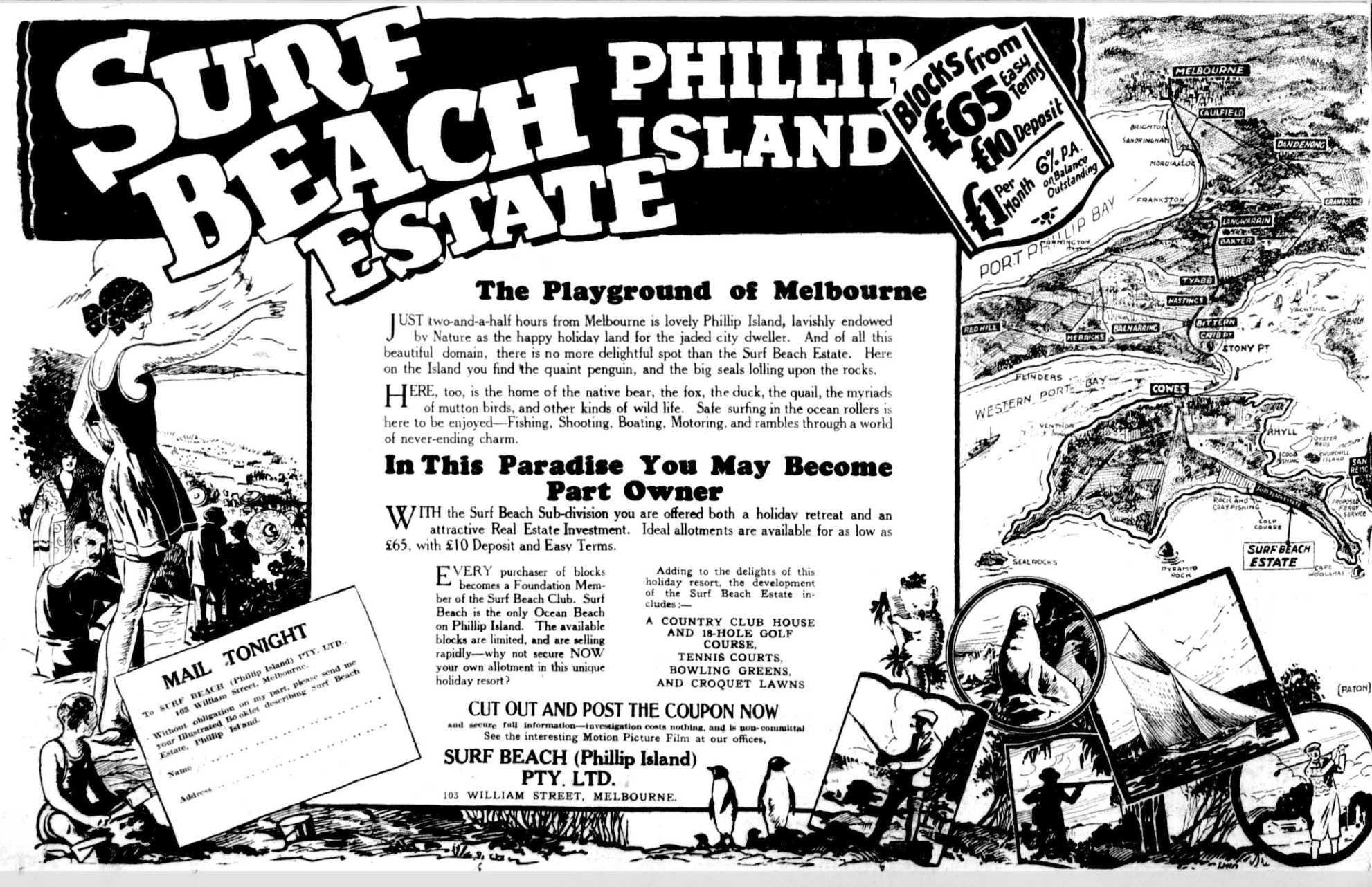
- Newspaper advertisement with depictions by artist Hugh Paton, 1926

- Coordinates: 38°30′26″S 145°17′25″E
- Country: Australia
- State: Victoria
- LGA: Bass Coast Shire
- Established: 1926

Government
  - State electorate: Bass
  - Federal division: Monash

Population
  - Total: 533 (2016 census)
- Postcode: 3922
- Gazetted: 23 December 1927

Surf Beach is a small coastal locality of Phillip Island in Victoria, Australia. Situated between Sunderland Bay and Cape Woolamai, the main town of over 500 homes runs in a narrow strip between Western Port Bay and Bass Strait. It was established by private developers in the 1920s as a holiday town and mostly developed after the Second World War.

== History ==
Phillip Island was part of the traditional homelands of the Yallok Bulluk people of the Bunurong (Boonwurrung) Nation for many thousands of years. Prior to Crown Land sales in the early 1870s and subsequent cultivation/clearing of the land, the Surf Beach area was open country with sprawling grasslands, sand hummocks and scattered Ti Tree. A map from 1911 shows a chicory plantation and kiln were located near the corner of Sunderland Bay and Phillip Island Roads. Dairy farms and fisherman's huts dotted the adjoining land.

=== Surf Beach estate ===
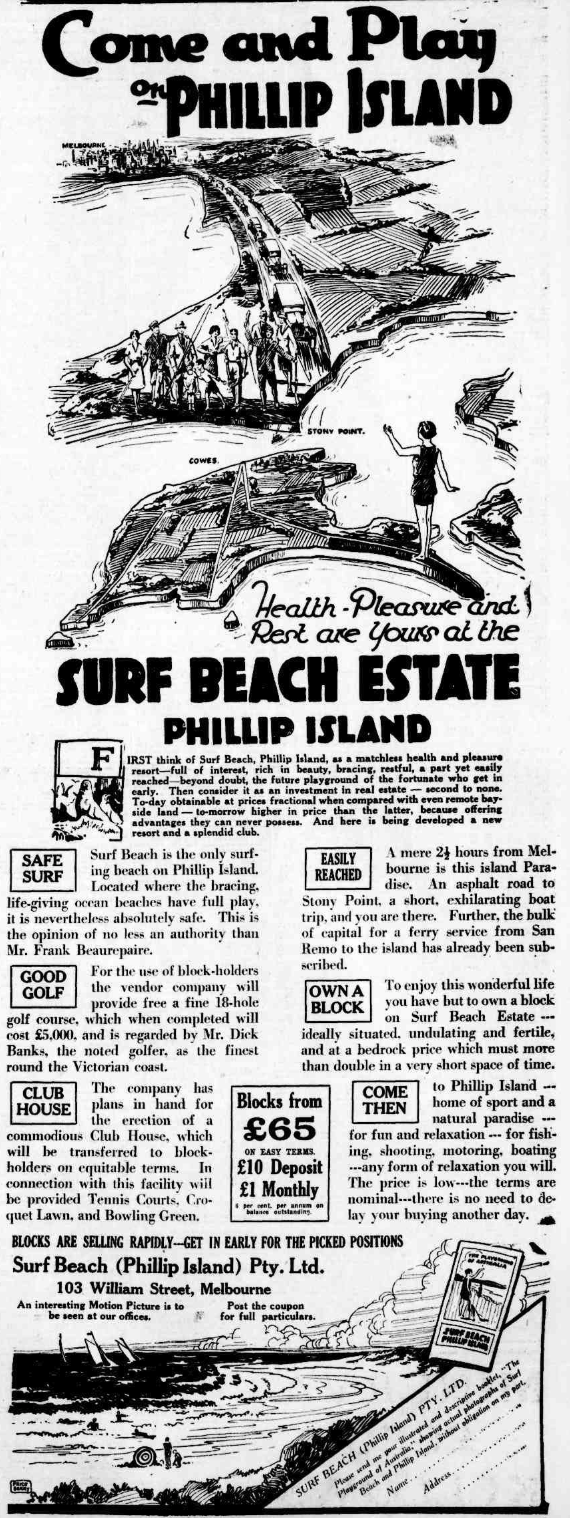
Advertisement, 1926

In 1926, a private syndicate of Melbourne businessmen announced plans to create a planned beachside neighbourhood known as the "Surf Beach Estate" with a golf course on a greater-than 150-hectare site. The subdivision set out 556 residential blocks, shop sites and extensive recreational areas. It was marketed to Melbourne families seeking holiday homes and promoted as the “Playground of Australia”, including through a promotional film. The scheme attracted the public endorsement of Frank Beaurepaire, who selected a block for himself.

The development was led by relatives Charles Columbine Jackson and Basil John Jackson, who worked with a circle of private investors. Both men had built their wealth through ventures in gold, gas and oil, alongside their Melbourne accounting practice. The estate’s first completed home was for George Seymour, an associate of the developers. Many blocks were also selected by speculative buyers, who did not necessarily intend to build.

On 17 December 1927, an 18 hole-golf course and clubhouse opened on the estate. Covering 57 hectares, the course was built at a reported cost of about five thousand pounds and was designed by professional golfer Dick Banks. One of the developers served as inaugural president of the newly-formed Phillip Island Golf Club. Land was also been reserved for tennis, croquet and bowling facilities.

The subdivision was formally approved on 23 December 1927. The former golf course, which had long been in a neglected state, was acquired in the 1950s for the town of Sunderland Bay.

=== Scenic Estate Conservation Reserve ===
The Scenic Estate is a former residential subdivision in Surf Beach that was never developed and later converted into a conservation reserve. It was originally part of rural land cleared for farming in the late 1940s. The site was acquired by Mervyn Frank Falls and subdivided in 1962 into 332 residential lots. It was marketed as the Holiday Isle Estate (later as Scenic Isle Estate), with many blocks sold overseas, particularly in Hong Kong, giving rise to the local name “Chinamans”.

During a period of rapid subdivision on Phillip Island, the Victorian Government imposed an interim development order in 1961, restricting further development. Due to the estate’s low-lying, marshy conditions, the land was deemed unsuitable for housing, and building permits were refused. Despite some illegal construction attempts, the subdivision was formally declared inappropriate for development in 1983.

For several decades the unbuilt estate was subject to misuse, including illegal camping, dumping, and off-road vehicle damage. Over time, however, the former farmland underwent significant natural regeneration, with native grasslands, swamp paperbark scrub and coastal woodland re-establishing. Environmental assessments in the early 2010s identified the area as having high conservation value. Bass Coast Shire Council progressively acquired most of the lots and, in 2013, established the Scenic Estate Conservation Reserve, which officially opened to the public in 2015.

=== Modern history ===
Virtually all roads in the locality of Surf Beach remain unpaved, despite a council attempt to seal them in 2023. This attempt was defeated by a majority of rate payers, due largely to financial and character considerations. The town is serviced by several wastewater pumping stations, some of which were designed to look like chicory kilns.

== Architecture ==
Although few of the homes built during the estate’s first population boom in the late 1920s and early 1930s survived into the next century, a 1926-built house remains at Dunvegan Crescent and is now used for short stay accommodation. Surf Beach retains numerous post-war fibro beach houses built during Phillip Island's post–World War II holiday boom, although contemporary coastal houses have increasingly replaced them since the late twentieth century. One notable example is a house designed by Peter Maddison at the southern end of Surf Crescent, which won the RAIA Victorian Chapter’s New Residential Award in 1995 and remains a local landmark. Many newer homes incorporate steep square roofs inspired by the island's historic chicory kilns. Some newer homes also reference Federation or Interwar styles, incorporating wide verandahs and decorative timber.
