= Sunderland Bay =

- Town
- Coordinates: 38°30′19″S 145°16′41″E
- Country: Australia
- State: Victoria
- LGA: Bass Coast Shire

Government
  - State electorate: Bass
  - Federal division: Monash

Population
  - Total: 234 (2016 census)
- Postcode: 3922

Sunderland Bay is a quiet coastal locality on Phillip Island in Victoria, Australia, positioned between Surf Beach and Smiths Beach. Characterised by its rugged natural scenery, Sunderland Bay overlooks Bass Strait, featuring rocky outcrops, cliffs, and secluded sandy beaches.

== History ==
The town of Sunderland Bay was created by a series of private residential subdivisions in the 1960s. It was established over the old Surf Beach Golf Course, which opened in 1927 as part of the adjoining Surf Beach Estate. Its lifespan was short, as the area was acquired by developers during the post-war housing boom. Over 300 allotments were subdivided between January 1961 and September 1966.
