= Bass, Victoria =

Bass
- Town
- Coordinates: 38°29′0″S 145°27′0″E
- Country: Australia
- State: Victoria
- LGA: Bass Coast Shire
- Location: 113 km (70 mi) SE of Melbourne; 24 km (15 mi) NW of Wonthaggi; 13 km (8.1 mi) NE of San Remo

Government
  - State electorate: Bass
  - Federal division: Monash

Population
  - Total: 405 (2021 census)
- Postcode: 3991

Bass (/ˈbæs/) is a town 113 kilometres (70 mi) south-east of Melbourne via the South Gippsland and Bass Highways, in the Bass Coast Shire of Gippsland, Victoria, Australia. At the 2021 census, Bass had a population of 405.

The town is named after George Bass who explored and named Western Port bay in 1798 in a small whaling boat and sailed some distance up the Bass River. A memorial to George Bass stands in the George Bass Park. In 1835 a Scottish immigrant from Kirkcudbright Scotland named Samuel Anderson sailed up the Bass River and established the third permanent settlement in Victoria he was joined in 1837 by Robert Massie. Samuel had arrived in Hobart in 1830 aboard the Lang and took up a position as bookkeeper at Circular Head with Van Diemen's Land Company before setting out for Western Port in September 1835. Samuel's brothers Hugh and Thomas joined him at Bass where they established a successful farming venture. The Anderson graves and some of their descendants are located in the San Remo Cemetery. Descendants of Thomas Anderson, the only brother to marry, remain in the area to this day.

The township of Bass was surveyed and settled in the early 1860s, the Post Office opening on 1 June 1862.

Located near the town is the former Wildlife Wonderland, which featured a Giant Earthworm Museum. This building allowed tourists to crawl through a magnified replica of a worm burrow and a simulated worm's stomach. Displays and educational material on the Giant Gippsland earthworm, which can grow up to 3 metres in length, and other natural history of Gippsland were also featured. The museum was shut down in 2012, and since become popular with "rough sleepers and urban explorers".

The town in conjunction with neighbouring township Kilcunda has an Australian Rules football team competing in the West Gippsland Football Netball Competition.
