= Newhaven, Victoria =

Newhaven
- Town
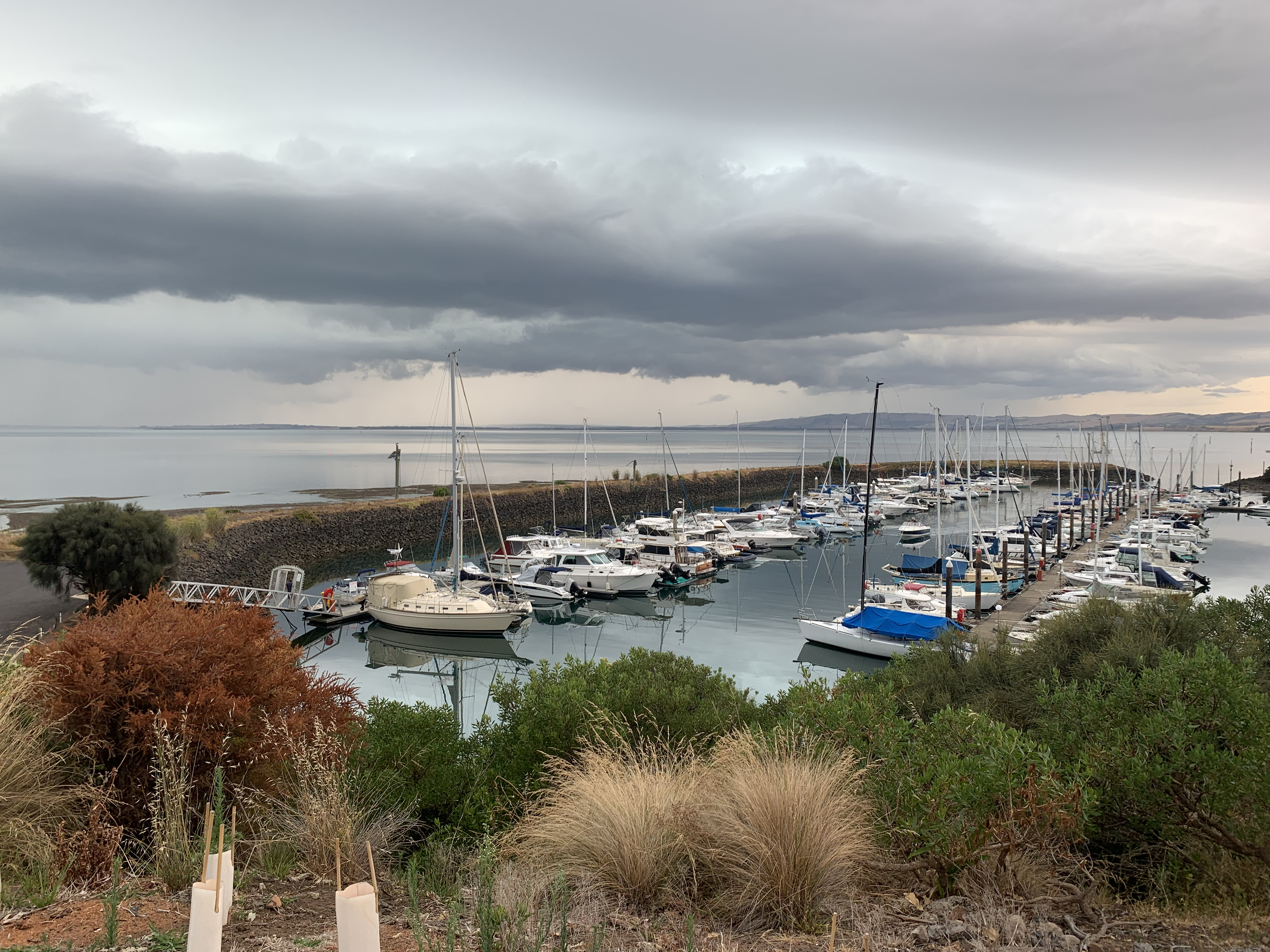
- Newhaven Yacht Club in 2022

- Coordinates: 38°30′45″S 145°21′30″E
- Country: Australia
- State: Victoria
- LGA: Bass Coast Shire
- Location: 126 km (78 mi) SE of Melbourne; 65 km (40 mi) W of Leongatha; 15 km (9.3 mi) SE of Cowes; 2 km (1.2 mi) NW of San Remo
- Established: 1873

Government
  - State electorate: Bass
  - Federal division: Monash

Population
  - Total: 547 (2021 census)
- Postcode: 3925

Newhaven (once known as Woody Point) is a town in southern Victoria, in the south Gippsland region. Located on Phillip Island, adjacent to the channel known as The Narrows, it is on the island side of the bridge linking Phillip Island to the mainland. At the 2021 census, Newhaven had a population of 547.

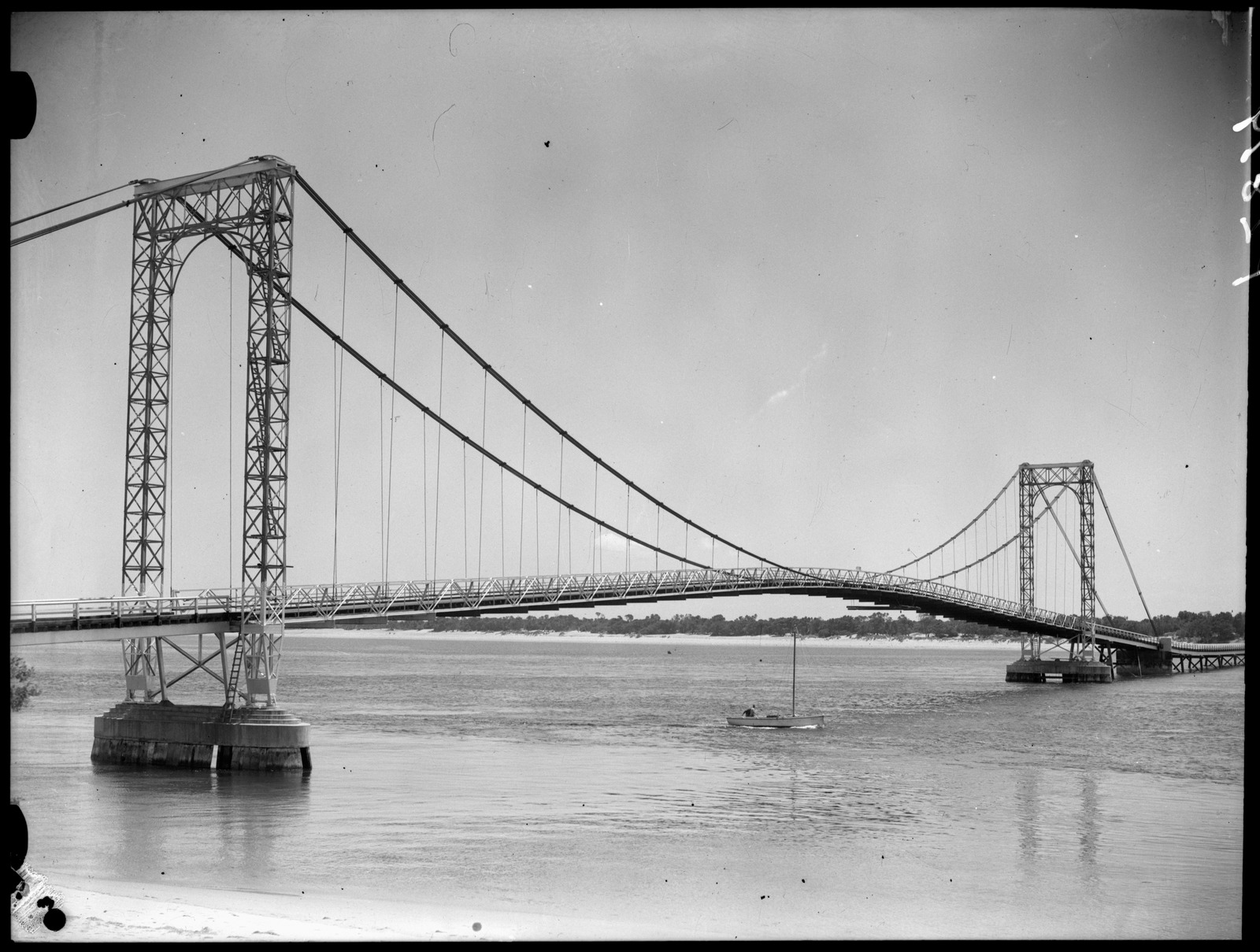
Old Newhaven Bridge in December 1947.

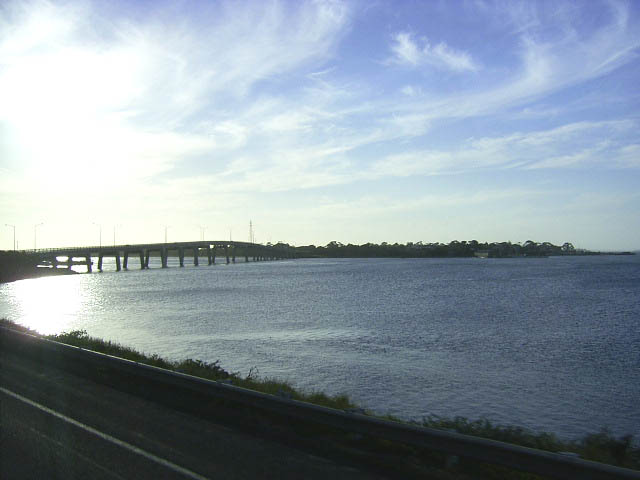
Phillip Island Bridge connecting Newhaven with the adjacent town of San Remo in 2005.

The town's economy is primarily based on retirement living and tourism, and has a yacht club with a marina. Atlantis Nereus tidal turbines are installed at Newhaven.

== History ==
European settlement in Newhaven dates back to the early 1870s with the establishment of the Newhaven Post Office on the 1 January 1873. The Post Office was closed in 1975. The population remained relatively low for most of the early part of the 20th century, until a suspension bridge was built between San Remo and Newhaven. The main industries in Newhaven were agriculture and fishing.

Since the 1970s, Newhaven has increasingly catered for tourists and retirees. The bridge was closed down in the early 1970s when the Phillip Island Bridge was built. The local primary school was first opened in 1890, and is still open today. In 1914, The Newhaven Anglican Boys' Home was opened.

During the 1920s and 1930s, a church was opened on the boys' home and subsequent housing for 'delinquent' children of the state was made. The boys' home was closed in 1973. In 1976 there was a discussion to establish a new secondary school for students. In 1980, Newhaven College was opened.

Since the 1970s, there has been substantial residential growth. In 1961, the population of Newhaven was 248. By 1991, this had increased to 740 people. This early growth was partly due to the selling and development of land along Cape Woolamai. The division between Cape Woolamai and Newhaven occurred in the 2006 national census.

Today, the main attractions to Newhaven are the Phillip Island Chocolate Factory, a caravan park and yacht club.
