= Kernot, Victoria =

Kernot Victoria
- Coordinates: 38°25′35″S 145°35′48″E
- Population: 100 (2016 census)
- Postcode(s): 3979
- Time zone: Australian Eastern Standard Time (UTC)
- LGA(s): Bass Coast Shire
- State electorate(s): Bass
- Federal division(s): Monash

Kernot is a town in Bass Coast Shire, Victoria, Australia.

== History ==
Kernot was a railway station in Victoria, Australia, built on the Wonthaggi railway line. Not long after the line opened in 1909, the station was equipped with a 10,000-gallon tank and crane and was located within walking distance of the Kernot General Store which closed at the same time as the line did in 1978.

The Kernot Food and Wine Store was established in 1911 and is the main gathering point for Kernot locals.

== Sport ==
Kernot Football Club played in Western Port Football Association in 1912, 1920, 1921 and 1923. Kernot were runner up to Nyora in the 1913 - Grantville District Football Association.

Kernot won the 1922 Bass Valley Football Association premiership with future Collingwood player, Bob Makeham in the side. They then played in the Glen Alvie Football Association 1932 and 1933.

== Links ==
- Kernot railway station
- 1922 - Bass Valley FA Premiers: Kernot FC team photo
