= Anderson, Victoria =

Anderson
- Town
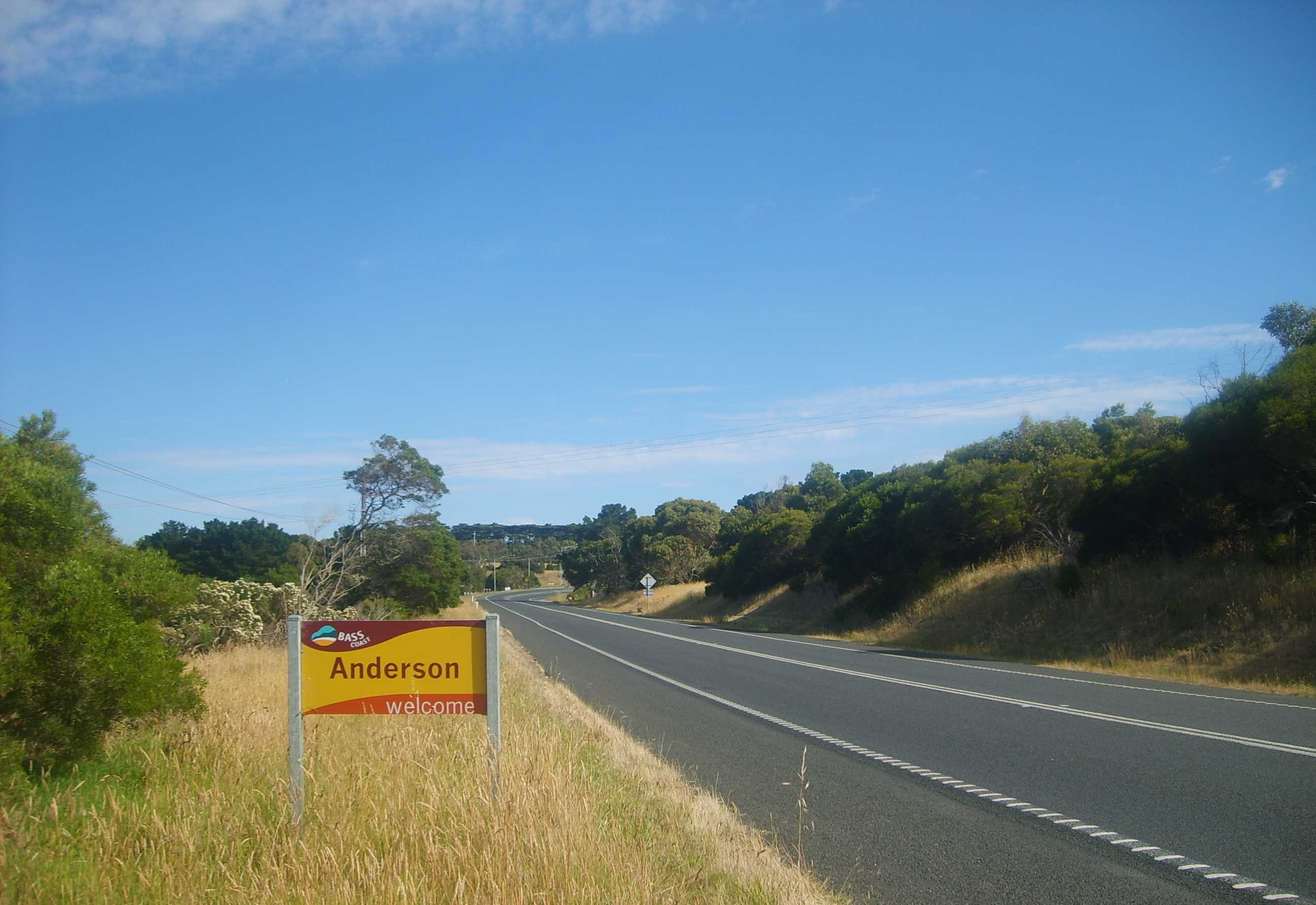
- The Bass Highway

- Coordinates: 38°31′35″S 145°26′48″E
- Country: Australia
- State: Victoria
- LGA: Bass Coast Shire

Government
  - State electorate: Bass
  - Federal division: Monash

Population
  - Total: 26 (2021 census)
- Postcode: 3995

Anderson is a locality in Victoria, Australia. The roundabout, which the locality is centralised around has been named the Anderson Roundabout, which is all the town is thought of today.

The town (and a nearby inlet) is named after the Anderson brothers, one of the first Europeans to settle in the area.

== History ==
The town was once a large farming and transport town as freight was moved up and down the railway line.

There was formerly a railway station (opened 1910) located on the Wonthaggi line. The station closed along with the line during 1978 due to poor patronage.

The Anderson Post Office (opened as Anderson Railway Station office) opened 1936 and closed 1971.
