= San Remo, Victoria =

San Remo
- Town
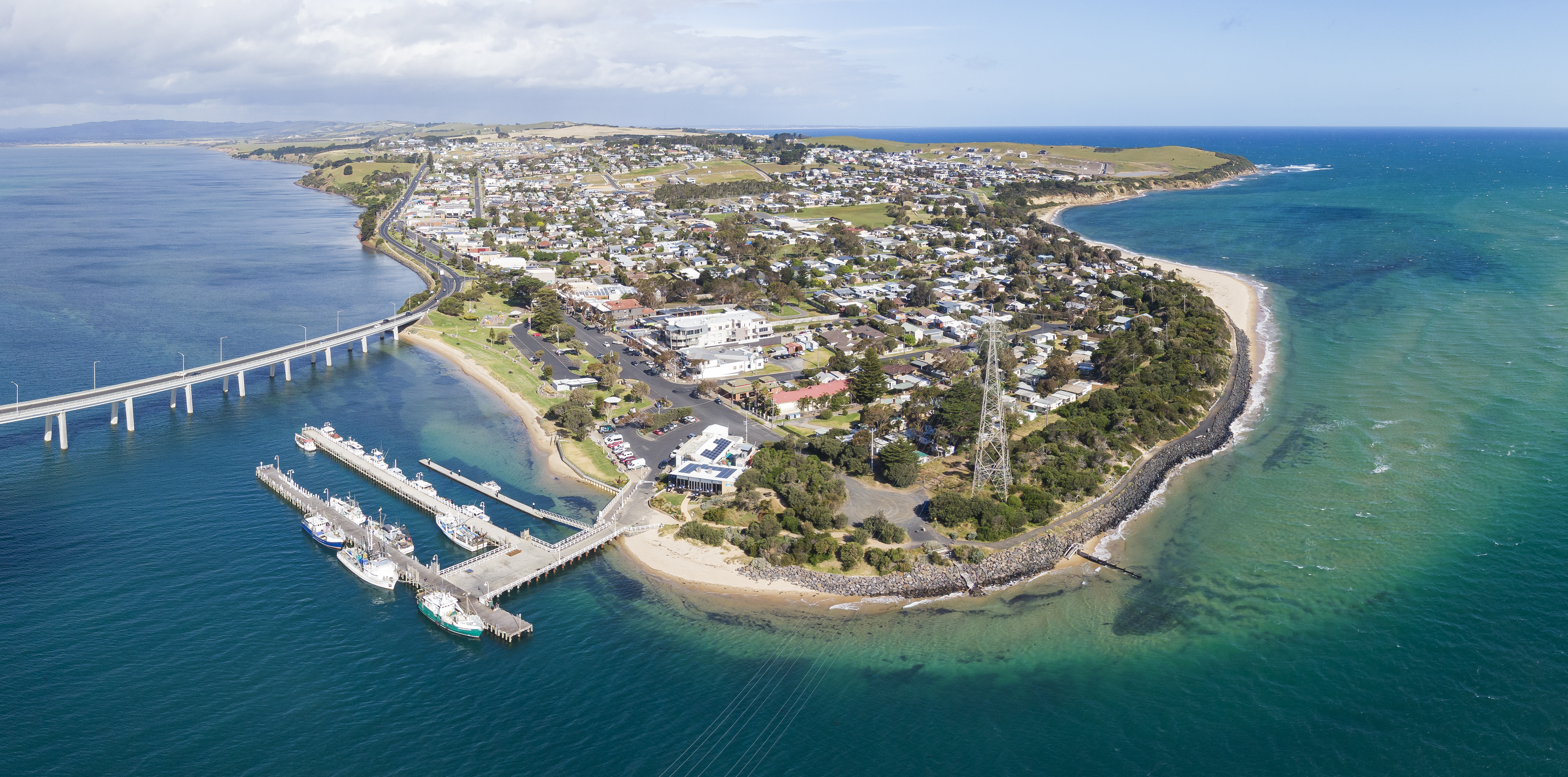
- Aerial panorama of San Remo

- Coordinates: 38°31′0″S 145°22′0″E
- Country: Australia
- State: Victoria
- LGA: Bass Coast Shire
- Location: 124 km (77 mi) SE of Melbourne; 25 km (16 mi) NW of Wonthaggi; 19 km (12 mi) ESE of Cowes
- Established: 1870s

Government
  - State electorate: Bass
  - Federal division: Monash

Population
  - Total: 1,700 (2021 census)
- Postcode: 3925

San Remo is a town in southern Victoria, Australia, located at the western tip of the Anderson Peninsula in the West Gippsland region. It is notable as the town at the mainland end of the Phillip Island Bridge, the only roadway onto Phillip Island. At the 2021 census, San Remo had a population of 1,700.

Originally established as a fishing village, the town's economy is now largely based on tourism, particularly travellers from Melbourne on weekend day trips around the Western Port Bay. It is located 122 km (76 mi) southeast of the Melbourne central business district, and can be reached via the South Gippsland Highway and then the Bass Highway. Its nearest neighboring localities are the towns of Newhaven and Cape Woolamai across the strait on Phillip Island.

== History ==
The area around what is now San Remo was used for many centuries by the Bunurong people who occupied an area of the Mornington Peninsula, of the Kulin nation. George Bass explored the coast and discovered the strait separating the mainland and Van Diemen's land, together with the bay he named Western Port.

Sealers frequented the coast and Islands in the 1820s before Europeans settled the coast.

Samuel Anderson, a Scottish immigrant, in 1835 established the third permanent settlement in Victoria at Bass. Anderson had arrived in Hobart aboard the "Lang" in September 1830 and was employed as bookkeeper for Van Diemens Land Co at Circular Head Tasmania. In 1835 he left the company and sailed to Westernport, it has been suggested that the sloop "Rebecca" was purchased by Samuel and his partner/s.In 1837 his soon to be partner Robert Massie also left VDL Co and joined Samuel at Westernport. The partnership of Massie and Anderson floundered in the credit squeeze of 1842 and the partnership sold by auction all their assets to repay creditors. This appears to be the end of the partnership with Massie probably relocating to Melbourne by 1844 then meeting and marrying Eliza Armstrong in 1845 then departing to Taraville.Samuels brothers Hugh and Thomas followed him to Bass and when land was released they bought over 2000 acres centred on the Anderson area today with their homestead "Netherwood" being built on the shores of Westernport.The Anderson brothers and their descendants featured prominently in the local municipal area. Anderson Inlet at Inverloch was named after Samuel Anderson. Descendants of the Anderson family remain around San Remo to this day.

In 1797 George Bass, a naval surgeon and explorer, took a voyage in an open whaleboat to explore the coastline. It was later explored on foot in 1826 by William Hovell. Around 1840 a deepwater port was established at Griffiths Point in order to provide exports of wattle bark, farm produce and cattle, and then later coal starting in the 1870s. A township grew around this port, and brought in tourists. In 1888 the township was named San Remo after the resort town in Italy. The Post Office opened on 14 August 1873 and was renamed San Remo in 1888.

Early in the 20th Century, commercial fishing of the King George whiting came to the area, the produce being sent to Melbourne markets via railway. Since 2006 San Remo has a tidal power test facility. Installed Nereus tidal turbines dispatch power directly to national grid . In 2008 a monument to those local professional fisherman lost at sea was erected with funds provided by local businesses and Rotary. A cairn with the names of those lost at sea with a navigation light atop is a main feature. Today there is a fishing co-operative near the bridge that supplies good fresh fish, particularly the King George whiting for which the area is known.

== See also ==
- Sanremo in Italy
