= Almurta =

- Town
- Coordinates: 38°26′0″S 145°33′30″E
- Country: Australia
- State: Victoria
- LGA: Bass Coast Shire
- Location: 107 km (66 mi) SE of Melbourne; 25 km (16 mi) N of Wonthaggi; 17 km (11 mi) SW of Corinella

Government
  - State electorate: Bass
  - Federal division: Monash

Population
  - Total: 66 (2021 census)
- Postcode: 3979

Almurta is a town in the Bass Coast Shire, Victoria, Australia. It is located along Glen Alvie Road and is 107 kilometres south east of Melbourne. A full office was opened on 21 April 1914 but was closed in 1969.
