= Grantville, Victoria =

Grantville
- Town
- Coordinates: 38°24′0″S 145°32′0″E
- Country: Australia
- State: Victoria
- LGA: Bass Coast Shire

Government
  - State electorate: Bass
  - Federal division: Monash

Population
  - Total: 1,168 (2021 census)
- Postcode: 3984

Grantville is a town in Victoria, Australia. In the 2021 census, Grantville had a population of 1,168.

The town was named after Lieutenant James Grant who surveyed the area in 1801.

== History ==
Historically, Grantville belonged to the Indigenous Boonwurrung people, who lived around Grantville and the surrounding area for thousands of years before European settlement.

Grantville was probably named by surveyor Edmund Colbert in 1870 after James McPherson Grant, MLA, a lawyer who was a member of Parliament from 1855 to 1885, president of the board of lands and works and commissioner of crown lands and survey from September 1864 to May 1868. Although generally accepted, there is no evidence that Grantville is named after Lieutenant James Grant, who had sailed the Lady Nelson into Western Port in 1801.

Grantville was established as a supply port situated on the east coast of Western Port. Sawmills were soon built and Grantville took a turn to become a town centered on timber. Short tramways were constructed between the sawmills and the jetty. Ships arriving at the jetty would bring in supplies for the locals and the land selectors further out in the Gippsland hills, and on their return voyage they carried timber to Melbourne.

The town fell into decline after the closure of the last of the sawmills in the early 1900s however 60 years on saw a new industry emerge around sand extraction for the production of concrete, this activity has revitalized the town which has seen an influx of new residents, and of new home construction.

== Facilities ==
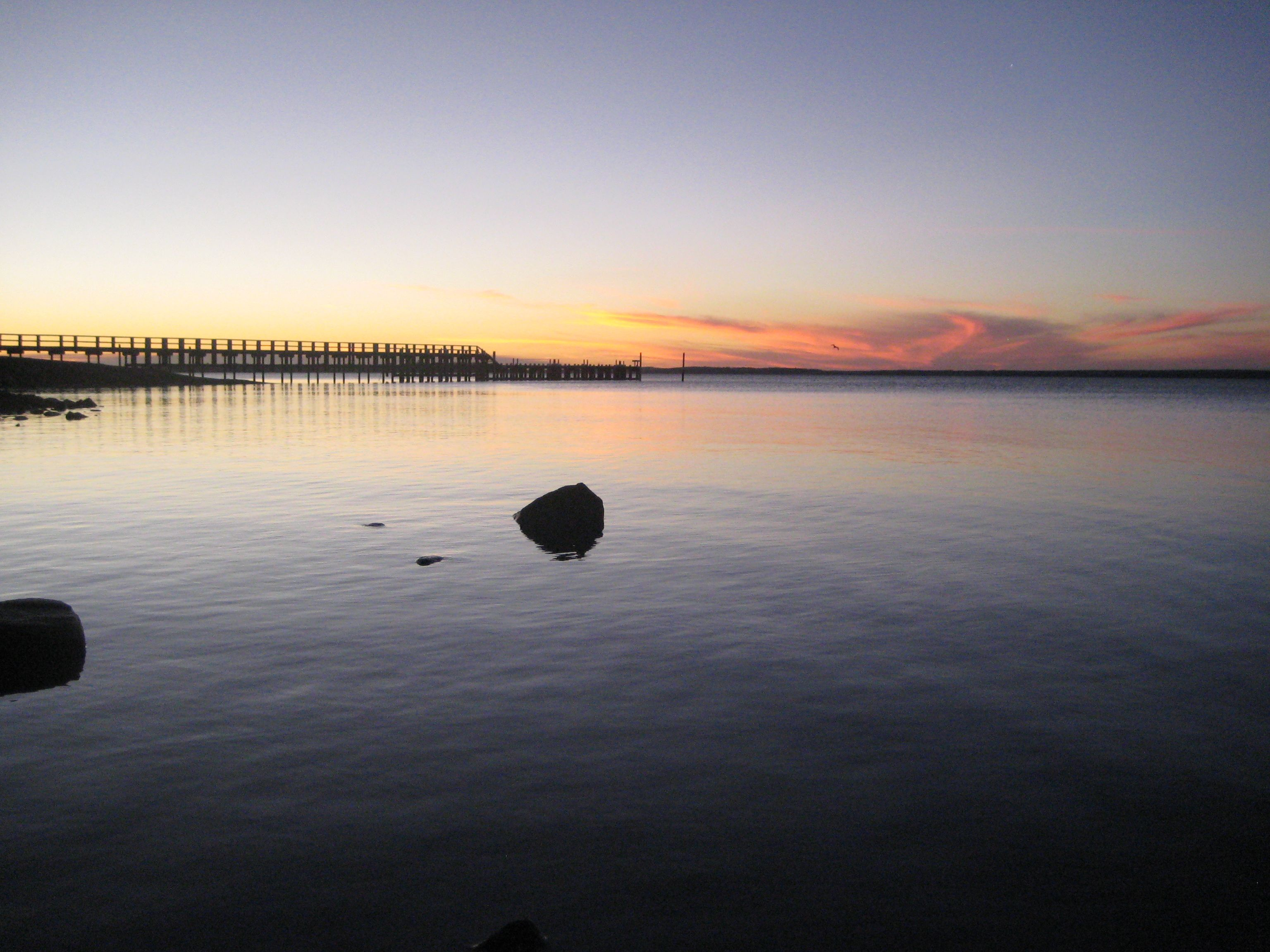
View from Grantville Jetty to French Island

The town houses some small shops including a bakery, fast food which include pizza, sovlaki, pantry and fish & chips, and real estate agencies as well as a petrol station and a Foodworks. There are also some bed and breakfasts and a foreshore caravan park.

Near the coastline, there is a jetty as well as a small park, manual pad and adventure playground. There is also a boat ramp.

Grantville also has a Bendigo Community Bank, a pharmacy which trades 7 days a week, a news agency and Post office.

It also boasts medical facilities and a 24-hour ambulance service. It is well served by a volunteer Fire Brigade (CFA) 24/7.

== Attractions and events ==
Grantville hosts a moderately sized festival and variety market on the fourth Sunday of each month. The event is held on a reserve adjacent to the Bass Highway near the western end of the town.

'Maru' the local wildlife park is one of the popular tourist attractions in the town. The park includes koalas, wombats, kangaroos, wallabies, quokkas, possums, squirrel gliders, daysurids, alpacas, donkeys, emus, cassowary, barn owls, cockatoos, freshwater crocodile, goannas, frilled lizards, turtle, carpet pythons, frogs and other animals.
