= Local government in Victoria =

Third tier of government in Victoria, Australia

A map of local government areas in Victoria

Detail of local government areas in and around Melbourne

Types of LGAs

LGAs in 1992

Local government in the Australian state of Victoria consists of 79 local government areas (LGAs). Also referred to as municipalities, Victorian LGAs are classified as cities (34), shires (38), rural cities (6) and boroughs (1). In general, an urban or suburban LGA is called a city and is governed by a City Council, while a rural LGA covering a larger rural area is usually called a shire and is governed by a Shire Council. Local councils have the same administrative functions and similar political structures, regardless of their classification.

They will typically have an elected council and usually a mayor or shire president responsible for chairing meetings of the council. The City of Melbourne has a Lord Mayor and Deputy Lord Mayor, who are directly elected, and in the other councils a mayor and deputy mayor are elected by fellow councillors from among their own number. Since 2017, the mayor of the City of Greater Geelong has not been directly elected. There are also unincorporated areas, consisting of small islands or ski resorts, which are administered either by the state government or management boards.

Council elections are held every four years on the fourth Saturday in October. The last council elections were held on 26 October 2024. An election was not held for the Moira Shire Council, which was dismissed by an act of Parliament in March 2023. In 2016, 637 local Councillors were elected in the 78 Councils contested. Casual vacancies of councillors are filled by countback of the last ballots, except for the position of Lord Mayor of Melbourne, which is filled by a by-election.

== History ==
Local government has existed in Victoria since before its separation from New South Wales in 1851. The Town of Melbourne was established by an act of the NSW Governor and Legislative Council in 1842 and the Borough of Geelong was established in 1849. Both bodies continued after the creation of Victoria as a separate colony, and both later became cities. Road districts were established under legislation passed in 1853. From 1862 many road districts became shires pursuant to the District Councils Bill 1862. To become a shire, the road district had to be over 100 square miles (260 km^{2}) in size and have annual rate revenue of over £1000. There were 96 road districts or shires created by 1865.

The first Victorian general act dealing with local government was the Local Government Act 1874 (38 Vict. No. 506). The act empowered shires to be established in territories that could financially support them, and boroughs to be established in areas not exceeding 9 square miles (23 km^{2}) with a population of at least 300. Promotion to town or city status was dependent upon the gross revenue of the council. Promotion was not automatic, but it was granted often.

Local government has been referred to in the Victorian constitution since 1979 (sec. IIA). It does not operate as to make Victoria a federation or protect the borders or powers of local government from amendment by executive order or act of parliament. Today, the constitution recognises it "a distinct and essential tier of government" and prohibits a council being dismissed by executive order, but grants significant powers to the state parliament in respect of local government. The clauses have been amended many times by parliament, but since 2006 the Constitution Act 1975 has required a referendum to further alter them.

The Local Government Act 1989 (No. 11 of 1989) eliminated administrative distinctions between cities and shires, introduced the category of rural city and removed the possibility of declaring any further boroughs or towns. Existing boroughs and towns were retained, although only one, the Borough of Queenscliffe, remains today, the others being abolished with the 1994 restructure. Between 1989 and 1994, five shires became rural cities.

By 1992, there were 210 municipalities in Victoria. In 1994, the Jeff Kennett government restructured local government in Victoria. His reforms dissolved 209 of the 210 councils (excluding the Borough of Queenscliffe), sacking 1600 elected councillors in the process, and created 78 new councils through amalgamations. In suburban Melbourne 53 municipalities were reduced to 26. The new local government areas (LGAs) were headed by commissioners appointed by the State Government. Democratically elected councils returned in 1996.

Since the 1994 reforms, there have been only a handful of significant changes to Victoria's LGA map:

- In 1996, the Yallourn Works Area, which had been under direct State control for several decades, was absorbed into the Shire of La Trobe.
- The Docklands area was excised from the City of Melbourne in 1999 and remained outside its boundaries until 2007. During this period, the Docklands Authority, a State Government body, took on most municipal functions in the precinct.
- In 2002, a 79th LGA was created when the Delatite Shire was split into the Rural City of Benalla and the Shire of Mansfield.
- In 2008 the inner suburbs of North Melbourne and Kensington, divided between the Cities of Melbourne and Moonee Valley as a result of the 1994 reviews, were fully brought under the control of the City of Melbourne.

A new City of Sunbury was proposed to be created from part of the City of Hume after the 2016 council elections, but this was abandoned by the Victorian Government in October 2015.

The Local Government Act 2020 (No. 9 of 2020) reformed the electoral systems used by LGAs, abolishing multi-member wards in urban areas and replacing them with single-member wards.

== General characteristics ==
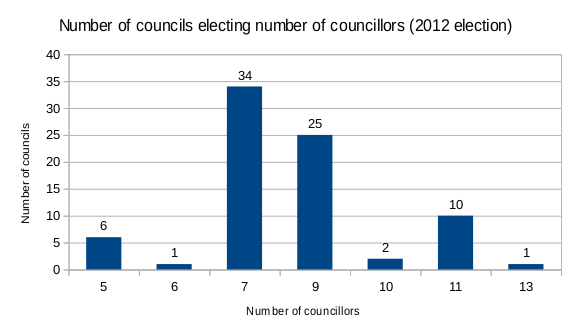
Different councils have different numbers of councillors

All local government areas (i.e. cities, rural cities, shires and boroughs) are governed in a similar fashion, with an elected council, one of whom is the mayor (in shires the mayor may use the title "president"; the City of Melbourne has the title "lord mayor"). The City of Melbourne has a directly elected Lord Mayor and Deputy Lord Mayor, whereas other councils elect a mayor from one of their number. The City of Greater Geelong has not had a directly elected mayor since 2017.

Some LGAs are divided into wards for the purpose of electing Councillors. Where a ward elects a single councillor, it is by preferential voting. Where it elects multiple councillors, it is by proportional voting using the Single Transferable Vote. Voting is in all cases compulsory for enrolled voters. Elections for all councils now happen on the same day every four years—on the fourth Saturday in October two years after state parliamentary elections.

The average area of a municipal district within the Melbourne metropolitan area is 285 square kilometres (110 mi^{2}); the average area of the remaining municipal districts is 4,545 square kilometres (1,755 mi^{2}). Despite this area being comparable to the average area of a US or English county, there are no administrative subdivisions such as American towns and cities or English parishes; suburbs (a part of an urban area), towns and rural districts, although legally defined, have a purely geographical existence.

According to the Local Government Act 1989, the term "city" must be used for a municipal district which is predominantly urban in character. "Rural city" must be used for a rural district which is partly urban and partly rural in character. The term "shire" must be used for a municipal district which is predominantly rural. In practice, this is understood as referring to the population distribution between urban centres and rural areas.

The term "borough", used in the Borough of Queenscliffe, is not defined by the act but has been retained for the single borough which survived the reforms of the 1990s. Under the repealed Local Government Act 1958 (No. 6299), boroughs, towns and cities were defined on the basis of area, population and rateable property. In practice, boroughs were and are small towns.

== Political composition ==
Largest councillor factions by party affiliation (regardless of endorsement) in Victorian LGAs as of November 2024

In contrast to ones at federal and state levels, local government elections in Victoria are a generally non-partisan affair. Major political parties typically do not endorse candidates at the council level. This has resulted in a situation where councillors may hold political party affiliation, but instead contest the election as an independent. These nominal independents have attracted controversy, with their affiliation being branded as insufficiently transparent. As the VEC, unlike in jurisdictions such as New South Wales, provides no way for party affiliation to be listed for council elections, candidates appear without any party label on ballot papers.

As a result, the overwhelming majority of councillors in Victoria are independents. The prevalence of independent councillors is generally larger in regional and rural areas, with metropolitan LGAs having a greater number of party-affiliated councillors. Nonetheless, recent trends have seen greater party involvement within local government politics. This participation has been large among smaller parties such as the Greens, with the major political parties subsequently indicating a potential change to their approach to council elections. Various residents' associations, community alliances and independent groups also sporadically contest elections.

The political composition of Victorian LGAs following the 2024 local elections, subsequent countbacks and party membership changes is as follows:

Party	Councillors
Independent	595
Greens	28
Labor	19
Libertarian	2
Liberal	1
Socialist Alliance	1
Victorian Socialists	1
Total	647

== Municipalities of Greater Melbourne ==
Thirty-one of the municipalities form the Greater Melbourne area, each being wholly, or partly, within the Melbourne metropolitan or urban area. All Melbourne suburbs lie within these municipalities. The outer of these municipalities such as Cardinia Shire and Yarra Ranges Shire have much of their area outside Melbourne's urban area. Greater Melbourne and regional municipalities are sometimes treated differently by state government legislation, for instance the Public Holidays Act permits non-metropolitan councils to replace Melbourne Cup Day with a local public holiday.

== Unincorporated areas ==
Victoria has a number of unincorporated areas which are not part of any LGA:

- French Island is an unincorporated area, as are two nearby privately owned islands, Elizabeth Island and Sandstone Island. Most services that would normally be provided by a council, such as waste collection and recreation facilities, are absent from these islands. On French Island, maintenance of roads and roadsides is carried out by Forest Fire Management Victoria, while the Bass Coast Shire is responsible for food safety of commercial premises. The Victorian Government maintains planning powers over all three islands.
- Victoria's six alpine resorts – Falls Creek Alpine Resort, Lake Mountain Alpine Resort, Mount Baw Baw Alpine Resort, Mount Buller Alpine Resort, Mount Hotham Alpine Resort, and Mount Stirling Alpine Resort – are managed and serviced by Alpine Resorts Victoria, a state government-appointed board. The resorts were excised from their surrounding LGAs in 1997.
- Gabo Island is treated as an unincorporated area by the Victorian Government for the purposes of formally designating bushfire prone areas.
- The Australian Bureau of Statistics includes numerous other uninhabited offshore islands, including Lady Julia Percy Island, in its definition of unincorporated areas of Victoria.

Before the 1994 local government reforms, the major lakes of the Gippsland Lakes (Lakes Wellington, Victoria and King) and the lake at Tower Hill were not part of any LGA. The Yallourn Works Area was under direct control of the State Electricity Commission from 1947 to 1996.

== See also ==
- Local government in Australia
- Local government areas of Victoria
- List of localities (Victoria)
- Counties of Victoria
- Road districts of Victoria (Australia)
