= Mornington Peninsula =

Peninsula and region of Victoria, Australia

- Peninsula
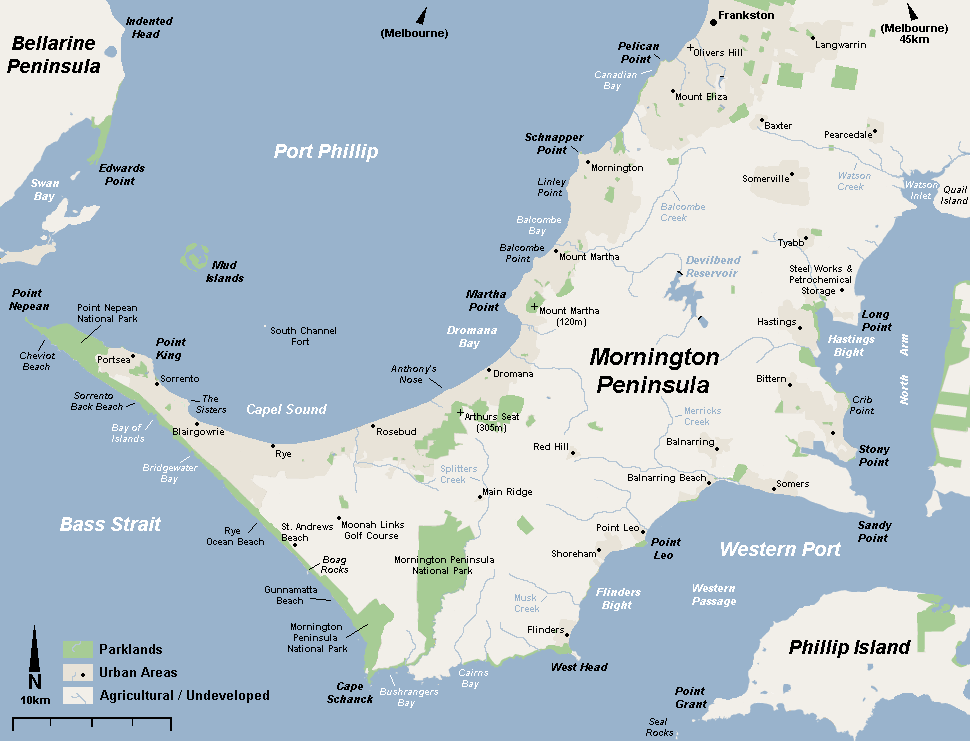
- Map of the Mornington Peninsula

- Location of the peninsula in Victoria
- Interactive map of Mornington Peninsula
- Coordinates: 38°21′04″S 145°03′50″E
- Location: Mornington Peninsula, Victoria, Australia
- Water bodies: Port Phillip; Western Port; Bass Strait
- Defining authority: Shire of Mornington Peninsula

The Mornington Peninsula is a peninsula located in the south-east of the Greater Metropolitan area of Melbourne, in Victoria, Australia. Surrounded by Port Phillip to the west, Western Port to the east, Bass Strait to the south, and connected to the mainland in the north, the peninsula begins its protrusion from the mainland in the area between Pearcedale and an area north of Frankston. The area was originally home to the Mayone-bulluk and Boonwurrung-Balluk clans, and formed part of the Boonwurrung nation's territory prior to European settlement.

== Geography ==
Much of the peninsula was cleared for agriculture and settlements. However, small areas of the native ecology remain in the peninsula's south and west, some of which is protected by the Mornington Peninsula National Park. In 2002, around 180,000 people lived on the peninsula and in nearby areas, most in the built-up towns on its western shorelines which are sometimes regarded as outlying suburbs of greater Melbourne; there is a seasonal population of around 270,000. On 30 June 2017, the Mornington Peninsula population was recorded at 163,847 people. However, in the peak of summer the population increases to 225,000–250,000 people each year, so that it becomes the most populous coastal holiday area in Victoria, with a larger population than Hobart.

The peninsula is primarily a local tourist region, with popular natural attractions such as the variety of beaches, both sheltered and open-sea and many scenic sights and views. Other popular attractions include the various wineries, mazes and the diverse array of water sports made available by the diversity of beaches and calm waters of Port Phillip and Western Port. Most visitors to the peninsula are residents of Melbourne who camp, rent villas and share houses or stay in private beach houses.

== History ==
The peninsula was formed by the flooding of Port Phillip Bay after the end of a glacial period, c. 10,000 BCE. It may have extended into Port Phillip at various times, most recently between 800 BCE and 1000 CE when Port Phillip Bay may have dried out.

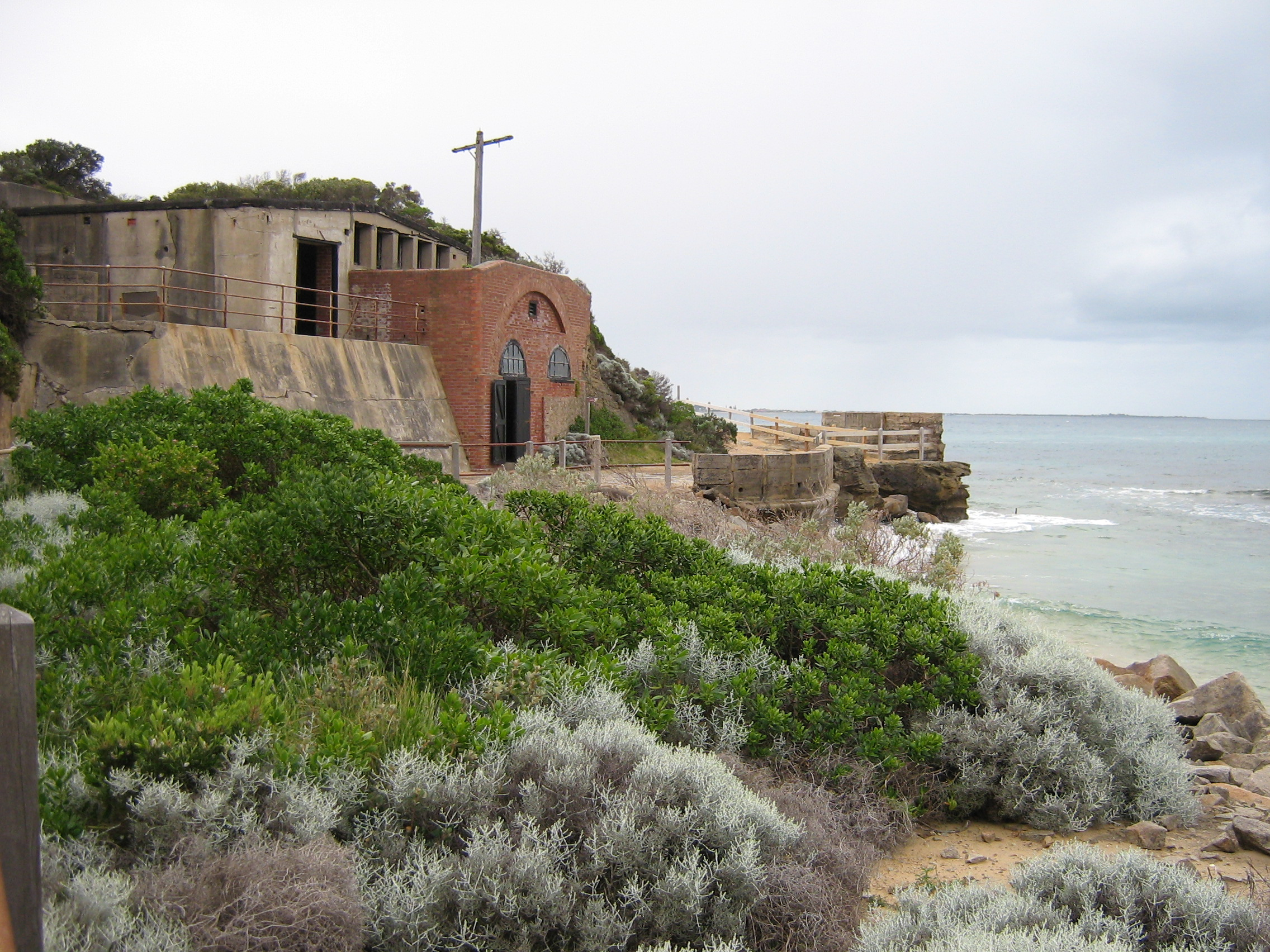
Military ruins on Point Nepean

Indigenous Australians of the Mayone-bulluk and Boonwurrung-Balluk clans lived on the peninsula as part of the Boonwurrung people's territory prior to European settlement. The territory hosted six clans who lived along the [Victorian coast from the Werribee River across to Western Port Bay and Wilsons Promontory. The peninsula may have been home to between 100 to 500 people prior to European settlement.

The first European settlement on the Mornington Peninsula was also the first settlement in Victoria, situated in what is now Sorrento. The Sullivan's Bay settlement was a short-lived penal colony established in 1803, thirty years before the establishment of Melbourne, by Lieutenant-Colonel David Collins (1753–1810).

At the time of European settlement in 1803 much of the Mornington Peninsula was covered with she-oak forests. These were quickly cleared to provide firewood for the growing city of Melbourne, and much of the peninsula was then covered with fruit orchards. Nevertheless, much natural vegetation still exists, especially in an area of bushland in the south known as Greens Bush, and the coastal fringe bordering Bass Strait and Western Port Bay. Most large areas of bushland are now included within the Mornington Peninsula National Park.

As professional farming has declined, hobby farmers with an interest in the aesthetic and the natural environment have taken over much of the peninsula. This has led to an expansion of natural bushland on private property, and many native species, such as koalas, are becoming increasingly common. The local council also has a slight lean towards sustainable practices.

=== Harold Holt disappearance ===
On 17 December 1967, Prime Minister Harold Holt went swimming at Cheviot Beach on what is now Point Nepean National Park. At the time, however, it was still a restricted area. Holt, who was 59 and had a recent shoulder injury, plunged readily into the surf. He disappeared from view and was never seen again. Despite an extensive search his body was never found. He was officially presumed dead on 19 December 1967.

== Demographics ==
In 2016, 17.8% of people in Mornington Peninsula Shire were born overseas. 8.9% of the total population were born in the United Kingdom being the largest migrant group in the region. 1.4% were born in New Zealand, 0.7% were born in Italy, 0.6% were born in Germany and 0.6% were born in the Netherlands. This was followed by smaller migrant groups from Ireland, United States of America, South Africa and Greece.

While 88.9% of the population speak English exclusively, the Mornington Peninsula population can speak other popular languages. 1.0% speak Italian, 0.7% speak Greek, 0.4% speak German, 0.3% speak Mandarin and 0.2% speak French.

== Geography ==
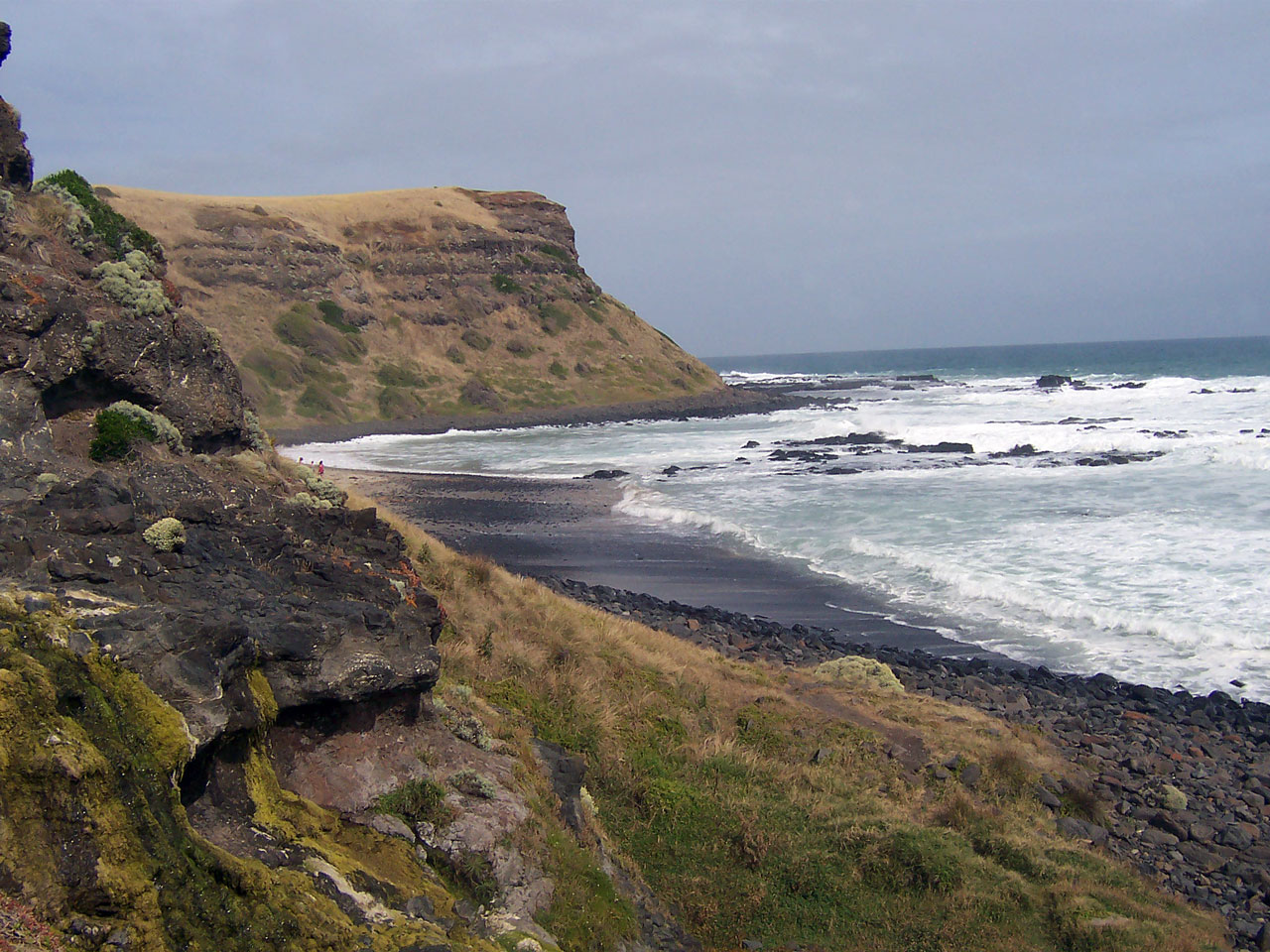
A beach on the Mornington Peninsula

The peninsula extends from the mainland between Pearcedale and Frankston in a south-westerly direction for about 40 km (25 mi) at a width of about 15–20 kilometres (9.3–12.4 mi). It then begins to extend roughly 15 km (9.3 mi) in a west/north-westerly direction and tapers down to a width of about 2–3 km (1.2–1.9 mi) before terminating at Point Nepean. Much of the topography is flat in the north where it connects to the mainland, however moving south-west, it soon becomes hilly, culminating in the central hilly landscapes of Boneo, Main Ridge, Red Hill, Tuerong and Moorooduc. The highest point, Arthurs Seat, located unusually close to the shoreline, stands at 305 metres (1,001 ft) above sea level. The peninsula hosts around 190 km (120 mi) of coastline.

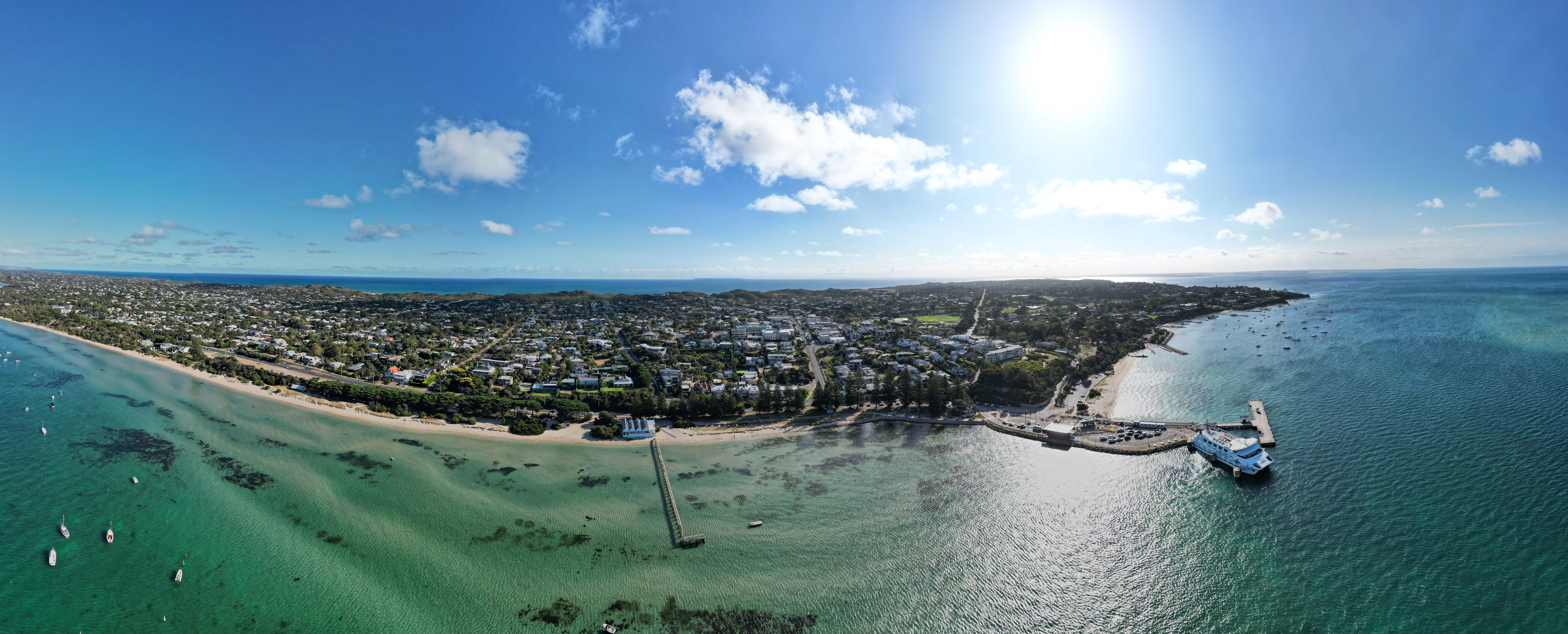
Aerial panorama of Sorrento. March 2023

Its eastern shorelines meet many mangroves and mudflats in the waters of Western Port before it tapers down to form Crib Point, Stony Point and Sandy Point at the peninsula's most south-easterly point. In the south-east between Sandy Point and West Head, the mudflats give way to sandy beaches which in turn become more and more rocky further south. In the south the peninsula meets Bass Strait and the coastline becomes very rocky between West Head and Cape Schanck. The coast between Cape Schanck and Point Nepean consists of a long slow curvature of open-sea surf beaches, many too dangerous to swim in. Its western shorelines form various headlands and bays in the sheltered waters of Port Phillip, hosting many shallow safe beaches.

The western coastline facing Port Phillip starts at the narrow bay entrance, The Heads or The Rip, and proceeds as a series of gently curved bays defined by small rocky outcrops.

From an oceanic perspective, the Mornington Peninsula, together with the Bellarine Peninsula, separate the waters of Port Phillip from Bass Strait, except for a small gap known as The Rip, which also separates both peninsulas. The peninsula also separates the waters of Port Phillip and Western Port.

The Mornington Peninsula is crossed by many seismically active fault lines, monoclines, synclines and anticlines; the largest of which is the 100-kilometre-long (62 mi) Selwyn Fault which is capable of producing earthquakes of around 7.5 magnitude. The Peninsula experiences many minor earthquakes every year, but most are too small to be felt. The last strong earthquake to rock the Peninsula had a magnitude of 5.0 and occurred on 7 July 1971 at 7:55 am AEST with its epicentre off Flinders, along the southern end of the Tyabb Fault.

=== Political geography ===
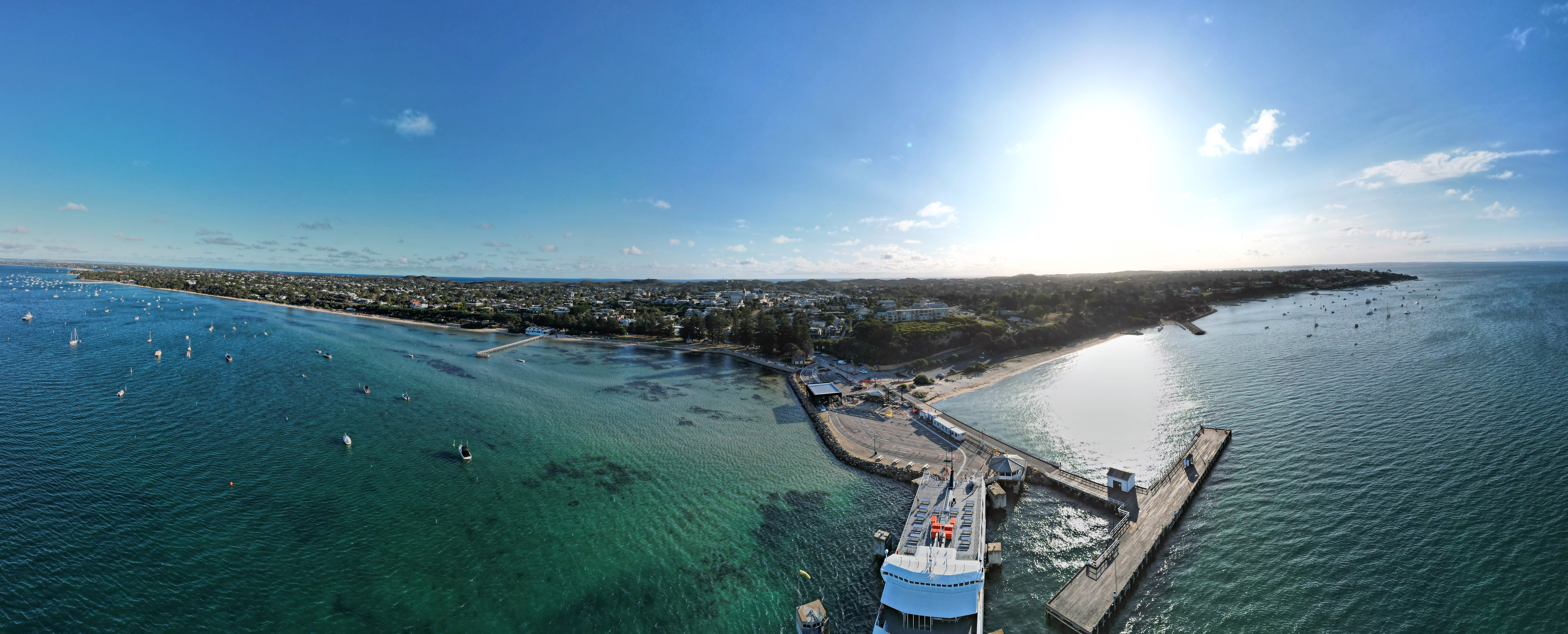
Aerial panorama of Sorrento with the SeaRoad ferry and Sorrento Pier, in 2023.

The Mornington Peninsula is located over 40 kilometres (25 mi) south-east of central Melbourne. As of 2016 it had a population of 154,999 which can swell up to 250,000 during the summer months. The majority of the Mornington Peninsula is administered by the local government area of the Shire of Mornington Peninsula, with southern areas of the adjoining City of Frankston and City of Casey forming part of the northern boundary of the region.

=== Mountains and hills ===
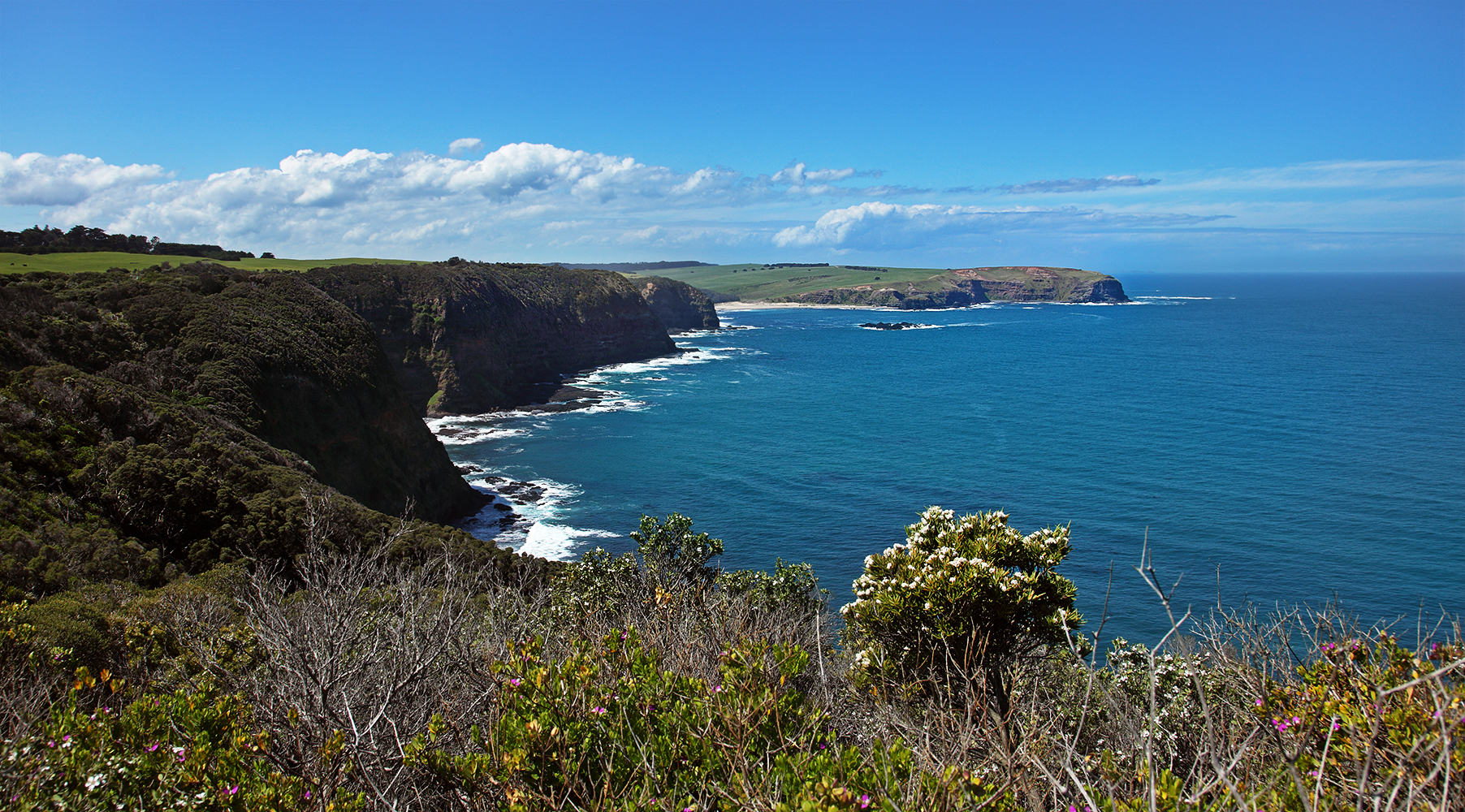
Bushranger's bay, taken from Cape Shanck

- Arthurs Seat, approximately, 305 m (1,001 ft)
- Chapmans Point, approximately, 274 m (899 ft)
- Franklin Point, approximately, 195 m (640 ft)
- Bowens Point, approximately, 145 m (476 ft)
- Anthony's Nose 40 m (130 ft) – tapers into Port Phillip, approximately, 145 m (476 ft)
- McLears Hill – northeast end, approximately, 145 m (476 ft)
- Mount Martha, approximately, 160 m (520 ft)
- Jacksons Hill
- Mount Eliza
- Red Hill
- Cheviot Hill – near Cheviot Beach
- Mt. St. Pauls – near Sorrento Ocean Beach

=== Shipwrecks ===
- SS Cheviot – wrecked in the rocks of Cheviot Beach (1887)
- Wauchope – sunk off the coast of Sorrento (1918)

== Environment ==
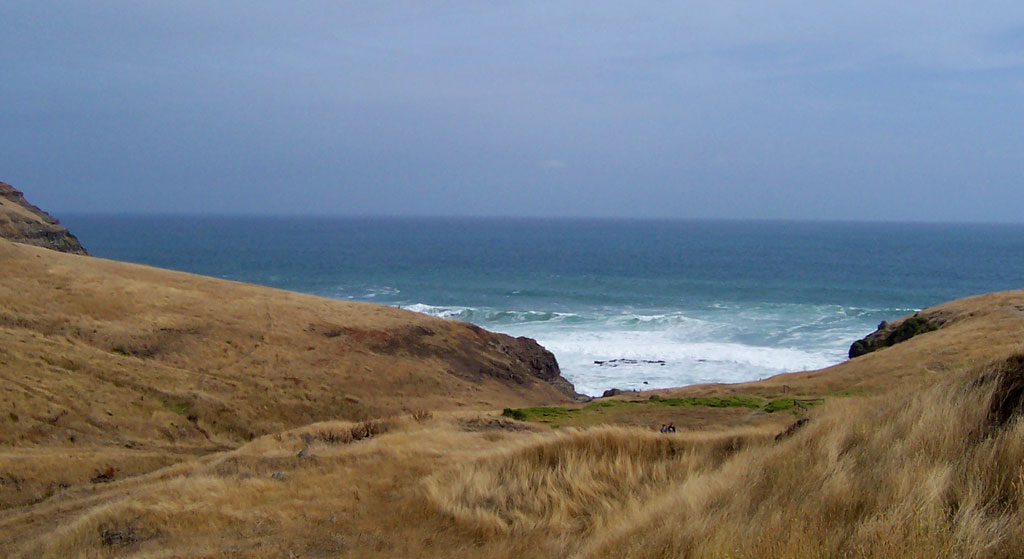
Cleared land for agriculture to the extremities of the coastline

=== Parklands ===
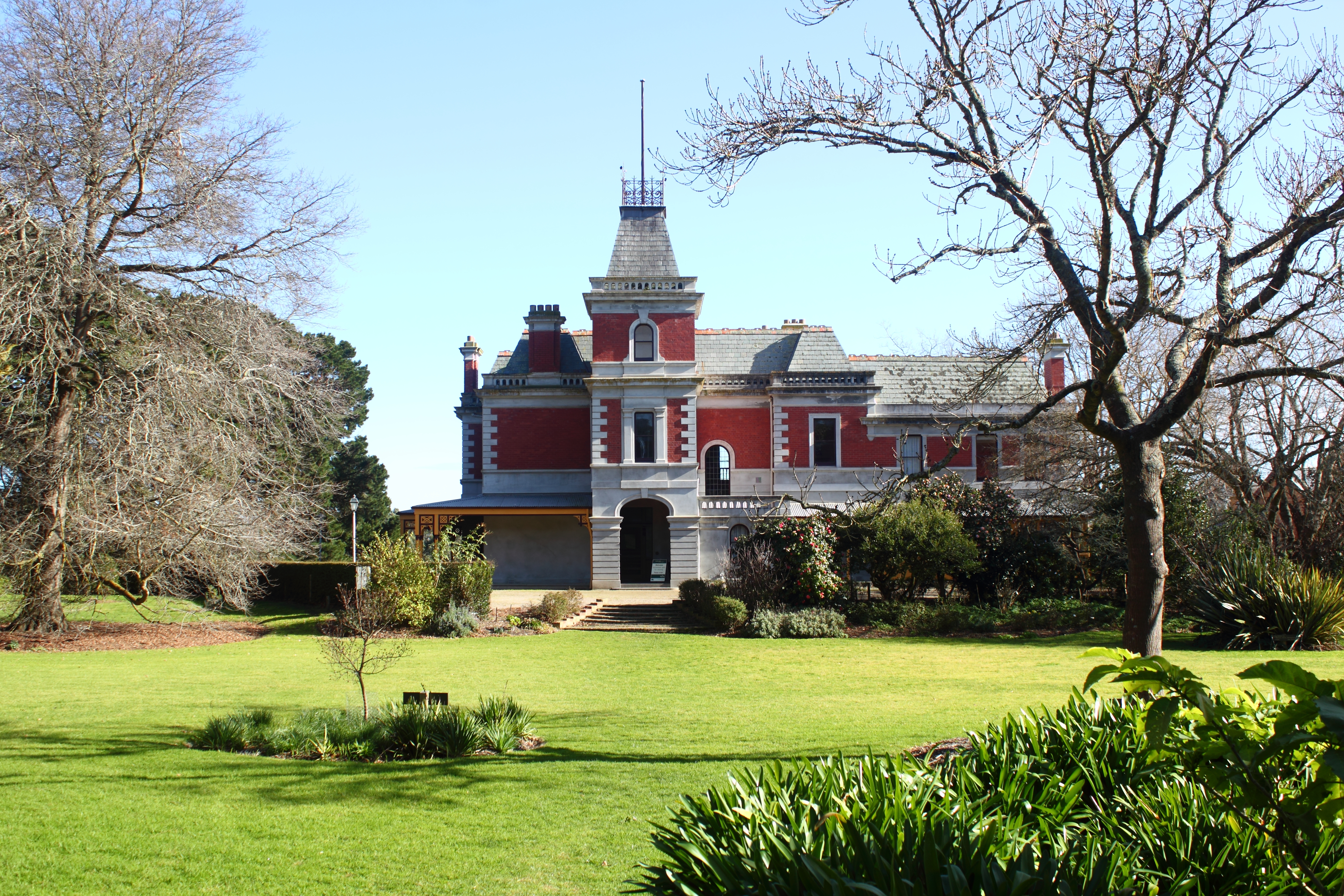
Coolart Wetlands and Homestead near the village of Somers

The peninsula is one of four biosphere reserves in Victoria, the other three being national parks, and the only one with a resident population that reaches some 250,000 people during the peak tourist season. Some of the major parklands on the peninsula include:

Land:

- Mornington Peninsula National Park
- Point Nepean National Park
- Arthurs Seat State Park
- Moonlit Sanctuary Wildlife Conservation Park
- Quail Island Nature Conservation Reserve
- Mount Martha Park
- Main Ridge Flora Reserve
- Coolart Wetlands and Homestead Reserve
- Baxter Park
- The Pines Flora & Fauna Park

Marine:

- Port Phillip Heads Marine National Park
- Yaringa Marine National Park

=== Environmental Issues ===
==== Gunnamatta Sewage Outlet ====
A sewage outlet near Boag Rock, a couple of kilometres up the coast from Gunnamatta Surf Beach, pumps treated sewage into the ocean which finds its way to swimmers and surfers at Gunnamatta during particular tidal conditions.

==== Crib Point Project ====
In March 2021, the Victorian State Government blocked a controversial project by energy company AGL to build a floating gas import terminal at Crib Point.

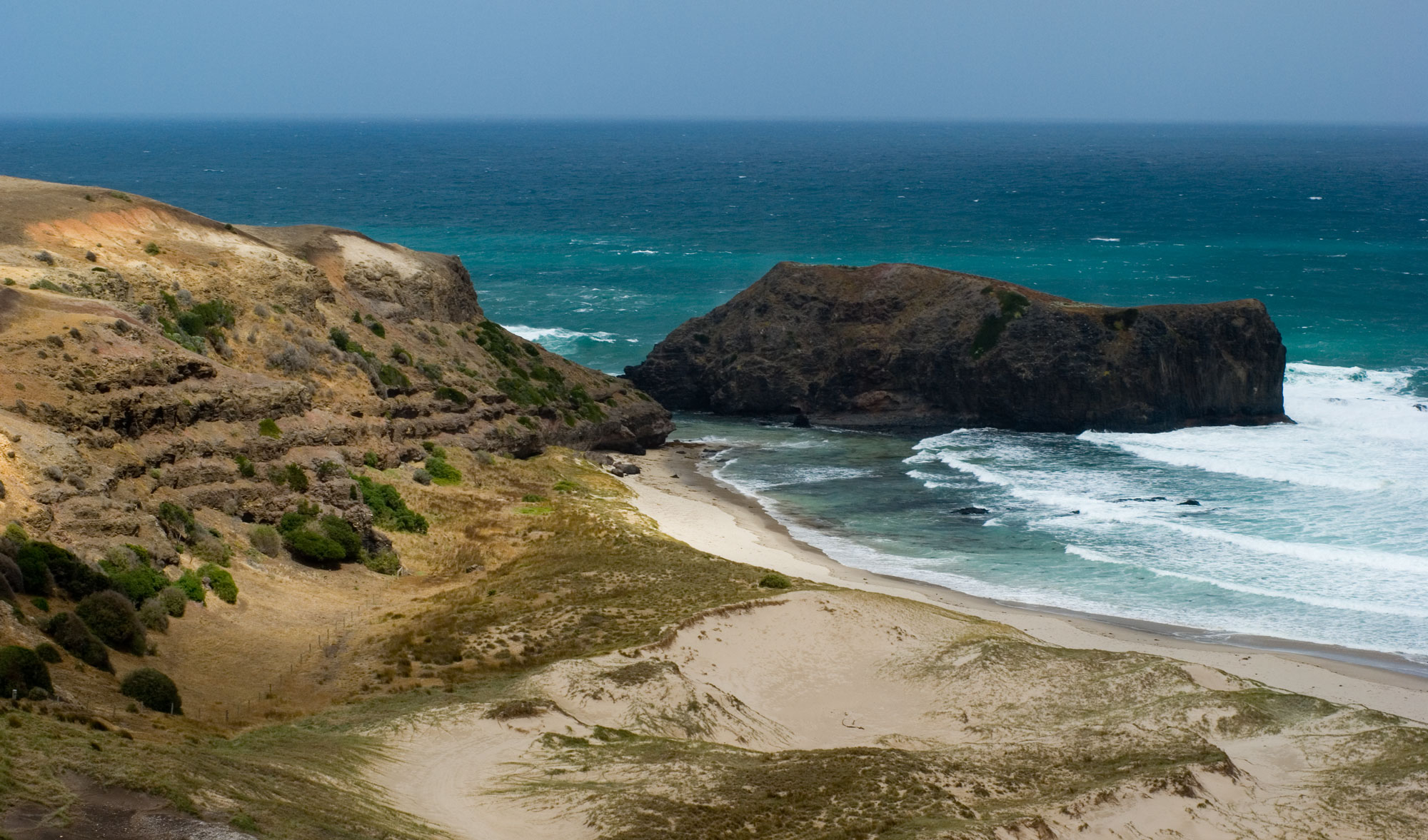
Elephant Rock, part of the Mornington Peninsula National Park

== Agriculture ==
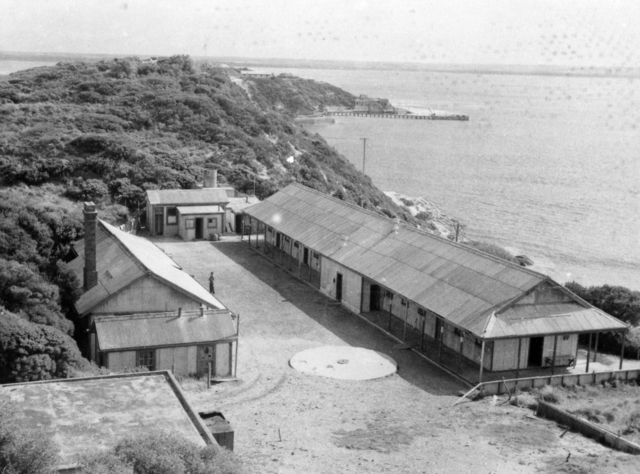
Pearce Barracks in 1946, with Fort Nepean in the background. (Australian War Memorial)

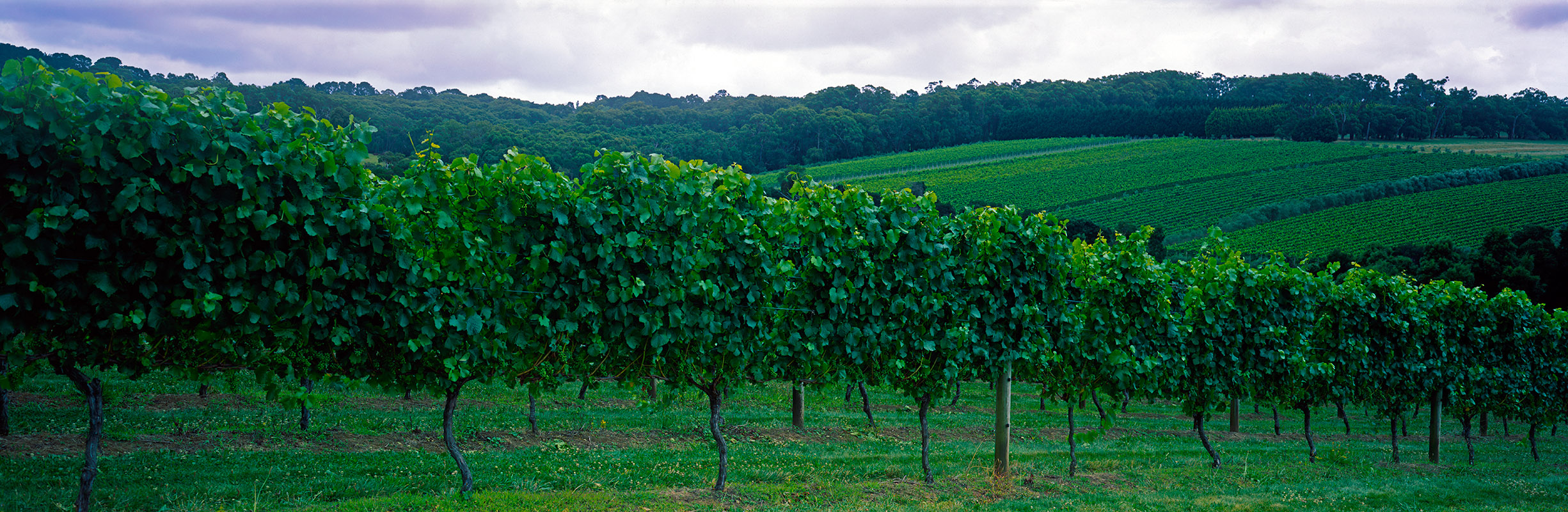
Morning Peninsula vineyard

The Mornington Peninsula is a notable wine region, producing small quantities of high quality wine from around 60 wineries. While most varieties are grown, the cool, maritime climate of the Peninsula is particularly noted for pinot noir. Many wineries are open for public tastings and several have quality restaurants.

Apples were the staple product of the Peninsula for several generations, with whole trainloads being dispatched to the city and ports. The number of orchards has been dramatically reduced, however there are many other producers on the Peninsula, specialising in berries, cherries, and other fruits, as well as market gardens. There is increased interest in organic production, and there are even organic beef producers.

The Peninsula not only produces fresh products, with small-scale manufacturers of niche products as diverse as cheese, chocolate, chutney, jam, and olive oil. Local produce is also to be found at markets held around the Peninsula, such as the monthly market at Red Hill. A local organisation, Mornington Peninsula Gourmet, has been set up to support the many small producers on the Peninsula.

== Transport ==
The peninsula is serviced predominantly by a network of roads. Public transport is limited to a bus service which services urban areas on the western shorelines and a train service for the eastern areas of the peninsula. The following methods of transport are available to access various regions of the peninsula:

- Road: The Peninsula is easily reached from central Melbourne via a number of roads. The Mornington Peninsula Freeway, which begins in Dingley Village and connects to the EastLink tollway in Carrum Downs is the primary road to the Mornington Peninsula from inner Melbourne and experiences the most traffic in holiday months. The Nepean Highway, which extends from central Melbourne and roughly follows the coast of Port Phillip Bay is another alternative non-freeway route. From Safety Beach onwards, Nepean Highway is known as Point Nepean Road and serves as the main arterial along the northern coast of the Peninsula, collector roads connect this road to the southern sections of the Mornington Peninsula Freeway. The Frankston Freeway and the Moorooduc Highway were previously the primary road route to the Peninsula prior to the completion of the missing sections of the Mornington Peninsula Freeway, today these roads act as another alternative route to the Peninsula travelling via Frankston. The Western Port Highway, which connects to central Melbourne via the Monash Freeway and South Gippsland Freeway is another route, primarily serving the eastern side of the Peninsula.
- Bus: A bus service runs along the entire length of the peninsula to Portsea, departing from Frankston railway station in metropolitan Melbourne. A number of bus services run partway down the peninsula from Frankston Railway Station along the Nepean Highway. These run to various destinations such as Mount Martha and Mornington, via Mount Eliza.
- Train: The Stony Point railway line runs from Frankston to Hastings and Stony Point, from where a ferry can be taken to French and Phillip Islands. A bus service also runs to Flinders on the south coast. Railway lines at one time also extended to Mornington and to Red Hill but these have now been closed.
- Ferry: The Searoad Ferry Service operates two vehicle and passenger ferries on an hourly service between the Mornington and Bellarine Peninsulas, departing from Queenscliff on the Bellarine and arriving at Sorrento on the Mornington.

== Tourism ==
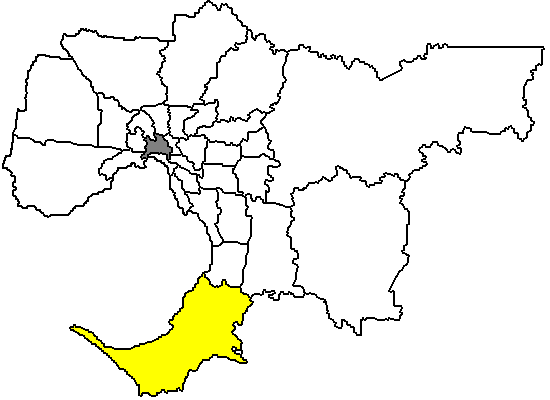
The peninsula in relation to central Victoria (Central Melbourne shown in grey).

The Mornington Peninsula has a long history of being a favourite holiday destination for residents of Melbourne with 24,000 holiday homes in the area. Mornington Peninsula tourism generates 10 per cent of local employment opportunities and is an important component of the economy. Popular tourism times are long weekends such as Cup Weekend and Queens Birthday, the week involving Christmas, Boxing Day and New Years, with the months of December and January being the peak tourist period. Most visitors to the peninsula are local to central Victoria. However, international visitors from Asian markets such as China have become increasingly attracted to the area with international visitors increasing by 3–4% in 2018. Overall tourism on the Mornington Peninsula has also grown with a 20% increase in overnight trips in 2017, with newly established luxury hotels such as Jackalope Hotel increasing the popularity of the region. 100,000 campers also enjoy the municipality's foreshore camping sites in the summer months for cheaper overnight trips. Short-stay rental services such as Airbnb have also become popular among tourists with 3.7% of the region's housing stock listed on the website.

The Mornington Peninsula is also the third most popular tourist destination in Victoria for day-trip visitors. The suburb of Mornington has become a tourist hotspot with 1500 visitors traveling to the town's Main Street via ocean liners in recent years.

=== Accommodation ===
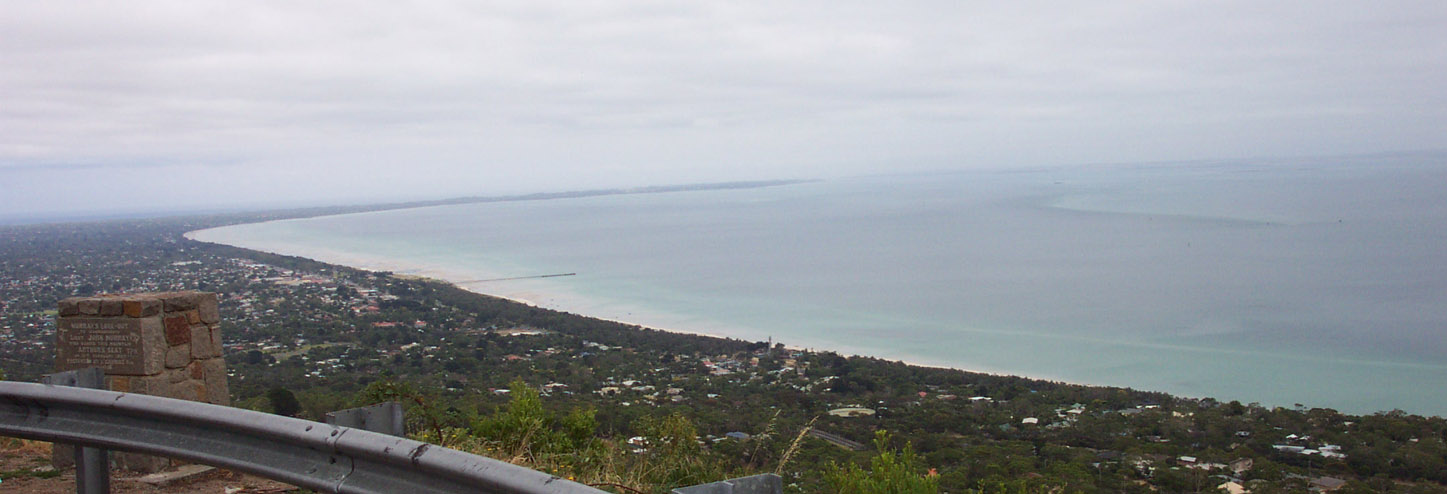
A view of Rosebud and Capel Sound from Murray's Lookout (247m) on Arthurs Seat.

Wealthier visitors to the peninsula usually own beach houses on large properties or with extensive views or beach access and as a result, there are very few established commercial hotels. There are however, many smaller motels priced to suit families and middle income earners. Large shared beach houses are also popular, although perhaps the most popular form of accommodation lie in the many caravan parks and camping grounds where many visitors own or rent on-site caravans and annexes or camp in tents. Camping is particularly popular on foreshore reserves where camping is permitted. Some visitors continuously book particular sites and many camping grounds have been camped on by the same family for 2 or 3 generations. For the unestablished tourist, these camping grounds must be booked anywhere from 1 to 5 years in advance for foreshore sites, while further inland sites are more easily available with at most a 3 to 6-month wait. It is estimated that around 30–40% of the houses on the peninsula are not owned by permanent residents reflecting the popularity of owned beach houses. Most of these 'beach houses' are owned by residents of Melbourne.

=== Other notable attractions ===
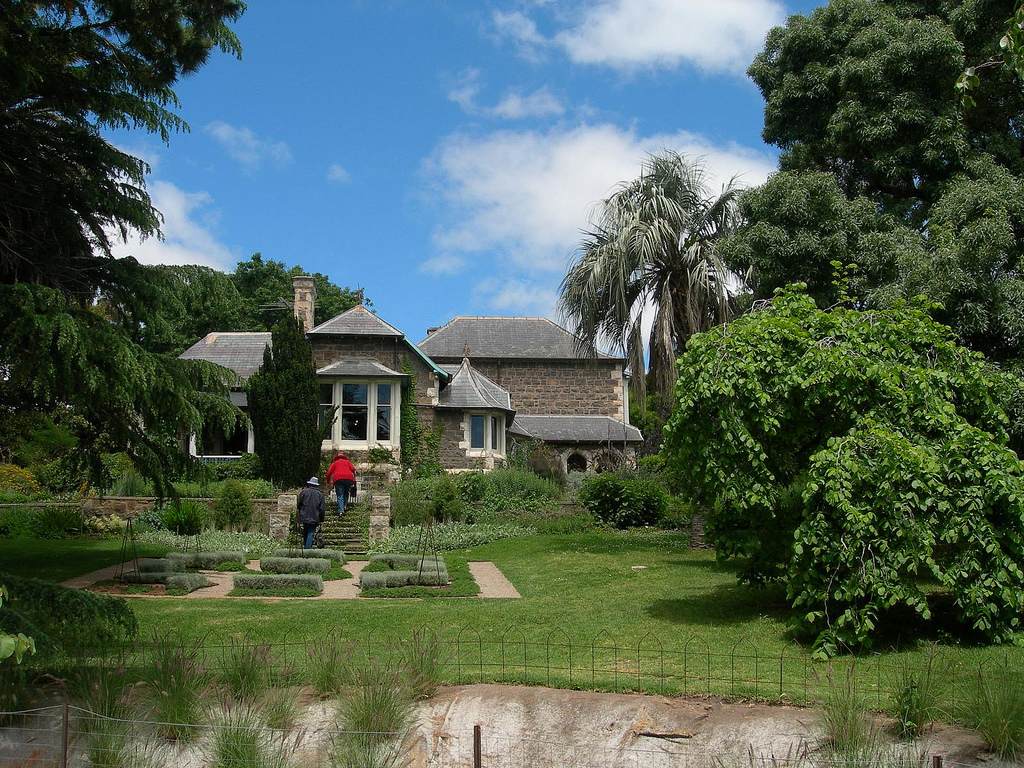
Heronswood house and garden, Dromana

In addition to the national parks and golf courses, other notable tourist attractions include:

- HMAS Cerberus – military base, historical buildings, museum and decommissioned Oberon-class submarine
- Moonlit Sanctuary Wildlife Conservation Park – native nocturnal animal walks held nightly
- Red Hill Market
- McCrae Homestead – historic house run by the National Trust of Australia
- Mornington Peninsula Regional Gallery
- McClelland Sculpture Park and Gallery
- The Briars Homestead and Park – historic homestead and wildlife sanctuary in Mount Martha run by the National Trust of Australia
- Heronswood – A National Trust house, restaurant and ornamental gardens run by the Diggers Club charity
- Peninsula Hot Springs – Victoria's first geothermal mineral spas
- Ashcombe Maze and Lavender Gardens
- Ballam Park Homestead

== Recreation ==
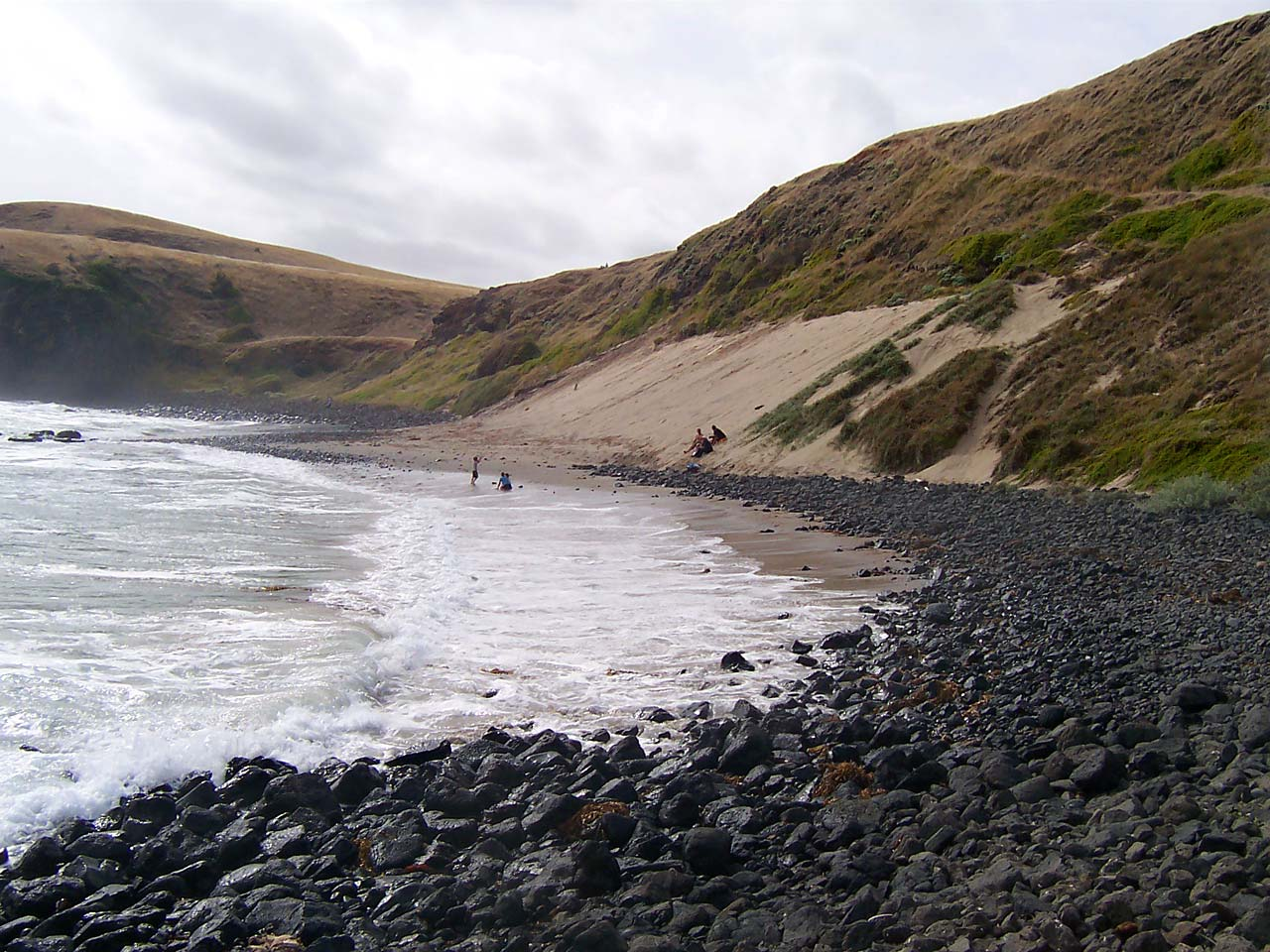
A rocky beach on the Mornington Peninsula

Some popular activities on the peninsula include:

- Hang gliding – On the steep cliffs of the south-west coastlines. Particularly near Portsea, Rye and Sorento. Hang gliding is restricted around Point Nepean.
- Skiffleboarding – Particularly on the flat beaches near Rosebud, Rye, Somers and Balnarring Beach.
- Surfing – On the south-west coastline on Bass Strait. Particularly at Gunnamatta, Sorrento, Portsea and First Reef at Point Leo Surf Beaches.
- Fishing – Mostly hobby fishing off piers and in beaches on Port Phillip.
- Sailing – Various locations on the shores of Port Phillip and Western Port including Somers, Balnarring Beach, Safety Beach and many others.
- Scuba diving – Particularly at Mornington Pier, Rye Pier, Blairgowrie Pier, Portsea Pier & Portsea Hole and Flinders Pier. Diving tours for Port Phillip and Bass Strait depart from Portsea. A remarkable variety of diving environments including wrecks, reefs, drift dives, scallop dives, seal dives and wall dives.
- Running & Cycling – Popular along the Nepean Highway as it follows the coastline on Port Phillip.
- Mountain Biking - Popular throughout Arthurs Seat State Park where a trail network is managed by the Red Hill Riders MTB club.
- Equestrian – Popular throughout rural areas of the Peninsula.
- Golf - There is a selection of golf courses for beginners and low handicappers, public access and private clubs.

== Annual events ==
- Winter Wine Weekend - Annual wine and food event at Red Hill Showgrounds
- Red Hill Show – Annual agriculture, cooking and craft event at Red Hill Showgrounds
- Main Street Mornington Festival – October food, wine and music festival held on Main Street, Mornington
- Mornington Winter Jazz Festival – Music festival held on Main Street, Mornington
- Rosebud Kite Festival – Annual novelty kite festival held in March on Rosebud beach
- McClelland Sculpture Survey & Award – Celebrated biennial outdoor sculpture exhibition
- Portsea Swim Classic – 1,500 metre swimming event held in January near Portsea Pier

== In popular culture ==
Crime novel The Dragon Man by Garry Disher is set in various locations around the Mornington Peninsula.

== See also ==
- Mornington Peninsula (wine)
- Mornington Peninsula and Western Port Biosphere Reserve
