= First Reef =

Surf break in Australia

A surf break at Point Leo, on the Mornington Peninsula, one of the closest surf beaches to Melbourne in Victoria, Australia is known as First Reef or more colloquially just "the Reef". Until the 1970s, there was little or no resident surfing population in Point Leo, so the Reef was mainly surfed by the few transient waveriders who were exploring the many breaks to be found in Westernport Bay.

== Early surfers ==
The earliest surfers (using the term loosely to include all forms of the sport) were probably body surfers, from when the armed forces used the area for training during the Second World War, and afterwards by lifesavers who eventually formed the Point Leo Surf Lifesaving Club in 1955. Early use of wooden paddleboards was superseded in the 1960s by fibreglass surfboards which became popular as the newly introduced sport of surfing grew. Nowadays, frequent visitors to the area include day-trippers from Melbourne and other towns close by, part-time residents with holiday houses, and regular campers over the summer season, some of whom surfed the reefs and shorebreaks up and down the beach.
