= Fred Lewis (naturalist) =

Australian naturalist

Fred Lewis (4 July 1882 – 7 August 1956), occasionally referred to as F. E. Lewis, was an Australian public servant, a longtime director and acting director of the Department of Fisheries and Game of the State of Victoria. He is remembered for his efforts in koala conservation.

== History ==
Lewis was born in Fitzroy, Victoria, a son of David Alfred Lewis (died 26 July 1939) and Eliza Emma Lewis, née Whitcher (died 19 May 1933). After an education at South Yarra State School, he joined the Victorian Public Service as a clerk in May 1900, and by 1910 was attached to the Fisheries and Game branch of the Agriculture Department. In 1912 he began an investigation at Maffra into seeding the Macalister and Avon rivers with trout.

Lewis held the position of acting chief inspector of Fisheries and Game from January 1913 vice J. M. Semmler (Note: James Michael Semmens (1868–1937) was appointed chief inspector of the newly-formed department in 1910. During WWI he served as a Lieutenant-Colonel in the Australian Army and later other honorary and paid functions, including chairman of the Repatriation Commission.) to mid-1924, when he was promoted to the substantive position. He retired in 1947 while on sick leave. Alfred Dunbavin Butcher (1915–1990) was his successor.

Lewis is remembered for getting the uninhabited Quail Island gazetted as a Nature Conservation Reserve. He was particularly concerned for the welfare of the koala inhabitants of French Island whose population had outgrown the island's manna gums' ability to produce foliage, to the disbenefit of both species. (Note: Lewis contended that the demise of the eucalypts was not caused by the koala's propensity to outbreed its food supply (as later observed on Kangaroo Island), but by fire and insect pests.) 50 koalas were transferred from French Island to Quail Island in 1929 and 200 in 1933.

In 1943 he dismissed claims by naturalist Ronald K. Monro that many Quail Island eucalypts had died and koalas were dying of starvation.

== Family ==
Lewis married Ada Lucie Smith on 20 October 1909.
