= Churchill Island =

Island in Victoria, Australia

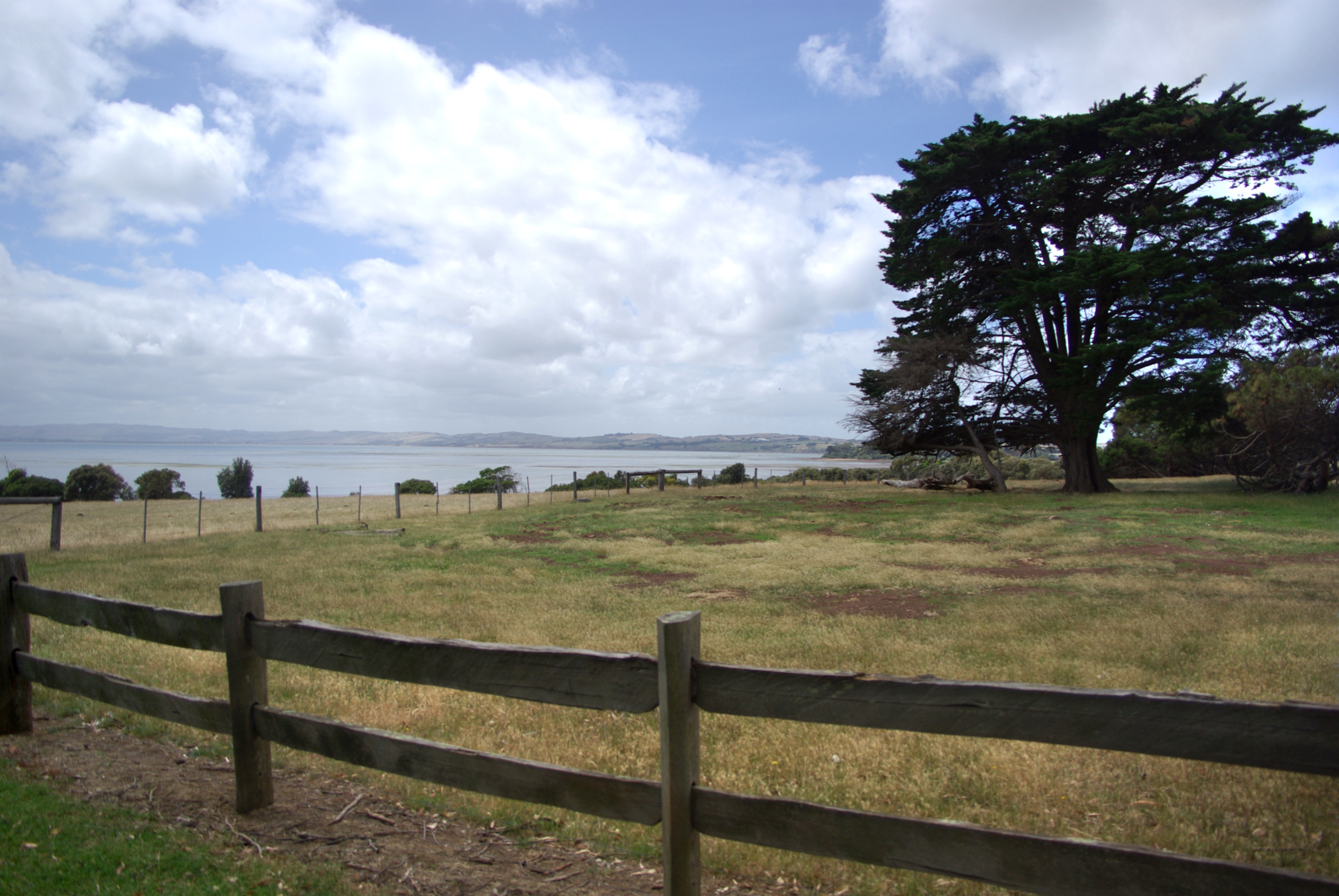

- Location within Victoria

Geography
- Coordinates: 38°30′00″S 145°20′20″E

Administration
- Australia

Churchill Island is a 50.7-hectare (125.3-acre) island in Western Port, Victoria, Australia. The island is named after John Churchill, Esquire of Dawlish. The island is linked to Phillip Island by a bridge, with Phillip Island itself connected to the mainland via another bridge. Notably, Churchill Island was the site of Victoria’s first European garden and wheat crop. The island plays an important role in the history of Victoria and features a working farm, fully restored cottages from the 1860s, and a homestead dating back to 1872, accessible to visitors. Adjacent to the 670-hectare (1,656-acre) Churchill Island Marine National Park the island is managed by Phillip Island Nature Parks and is listed on the Victorian heritage register.

== History ==
Long before European arrival, Churchill Island was part of the traditional lands of the Boonwurrung people, specifically the Yallok Bulluk clan. For thousands of years Indigenous people harvested its rich marine resources such as shellfish, fish, small marsupials, and seasonal mutton-birds (short-tailed shearwaters). Ochre deposits on Churchill Island were also used for ceremonial body decoration. Evidence of this long habitation persists in the form of shell middens on the island.

European explorers first entered Western Port in the late 18th century. Navigator George Bass sailed into the bay in 1798, becoming the first European to sight Phillip and Churchill Islands. In 1801, Lieutenant James Grant of the schooner Lady Nelson made the earliest European use of Churchill Island. Grant came ashore and cleared a small area of land to plant a variety of crops, including wheat, corn, potatoes, peas, coffee berries, apples, peaches and nectarines given to him for the purpose of creating a garden "for the future benefit of our fellow men be they Countrymen, Europeans or Savages" by John Churchill of Dawlish in Devon, England. This was the first European garden and crop of wheat grown in the present state of Victoria. Grant also built a simple blockhouse from local timber, though he stayed only a short time before continuing his survey journey. The island itself was named “Churchill Island” in honour of the seedsman, Churchill, rather than after Grant.

After Grant's brief visit, the island saw no permanent European settlement until the mid-19th century. In 1860, farmer Samuel Pickersgill and his family arrived from nearby French Island, becoming the first resident settlers on the island, though they held no title to the land. In 1872, Samuel Amess, a prominent stonemason and former Mayor of Melbourne, purchased Churchill Island as a rural retreat for his family. Amess constructed the substantial Amess House homestead (completed in 1872) and various farm outbuildings, many of which remain intact. He expanded the gardens, planting exotic species like a Norfolk Island pine (gifted by botanist Ferdinand von Mueller) and brought livestock onto the island. As a member of the Acclimatisation Society, Amess released game animals like rabbits, quail and pheasants, and established a fold of Highland cattle on the island. These Scottish Highland cattle thrived on the island, and their descendants still graze on Churchill Island’s farm today. The island was used mainly as a summer home and working farm when the Amess family owned the island, managed by hired farmhands while they visited seasonally.

Churchill Island changed hands several times in the early 20th century. In 1936 it was bought by Melbourne dentist Dr. Harry Jenkins, whose family maintained it as a farm and holiday spot. Dr. Jenkins brought with him a tractor and built the island’s first bridge to Phillip Island in 1959. By the 1970s, the historical importance of Churchill Island was widely recognised when The Victorian Conservation Trust negotiated to acquire the island, and in 1976 Churchill Island was sold to the state of Victoria for preservation. Volunteers and a “Friends of Churchill Island” group helped to maintain and restore the property over the next decades. Extensive restoration returned the buildings and gardens to their heritage appearance, and a modern concrete bridge replaced the old timber one for reliable access. Remains of stone foundations from two unknown buildings are also preserved on the island.

Today visitors can explore the Rogers cottage and the Amess House, heritage farm structures, and gardens that date back to the peak of the island's activity in the 19th-century, with exhibits about its Indigenous heritage as well as the first European farming in the area. Churchill Island and the area around it served as the location for the 1977 Australian film Summerfield.

== Events and Activities ==
Churchill Island offers everyday attractions to visitors as well as acting as an event venue throughout the year. Many events held on the island emphasise local produce, culture and education. Some key events and programs include:

- On the first Saturday of each month, Churchill Island’s barnyard and grounds hosts a community farmers’ market. Stallholders from around the region sell fresh organic produce, artisanal foods, homemade preserves, baked goods, plants and crafts.
- In addition to daily farm activities, the island schedules extra heritage and cultural demonstrations during weekends, school holidays and public holiday periods. Some of these events include a blacksmithing demo at the forge in the morning, sheep shearing and cow milking in the early afternoon, and working dog and whip-cracking shows throughout the day. These demonstrations are free with admission onto the island. Special themed weekends sometimes occur as well, such as a heritage gardening day or vintage machinery rally where local volunteers showcase old tractors, steam engines or craft skills.
- The island hosts curriculum-aligned educational programs for schools that cover topics like Indigenous culture, early settler life, and sustainability in farming. The educational program on the island includes a replica Aboriginal midden, activities for students to try farm chores from the 1800s, and learning how crops were grown without modern technology.
- Churchill Island is a venue for several seasonal events and festivals throughout the year. In summer, it is the location of the annual Ocean Sounds music festival, an all-day outdoor concert featuring live music and food and wine stalls. Other events in the past have included food and wine fairs, art and photography workshops, and themed historical reenactment days. During the winter months, the Winter Whale Festival on Phillip Island often includes guided walks on Churchill Island to spot migratory whales in Western Port.

== Natural environment ==
The Churchill Island Marine National Park adjoins the island's western shore, and Western Port bay, in which the island is located, is listed under the Ramsar Convention. Cape Barren geese can be frequently observed on the island.
