= French Island National Park =

- IUCN category II (national park)
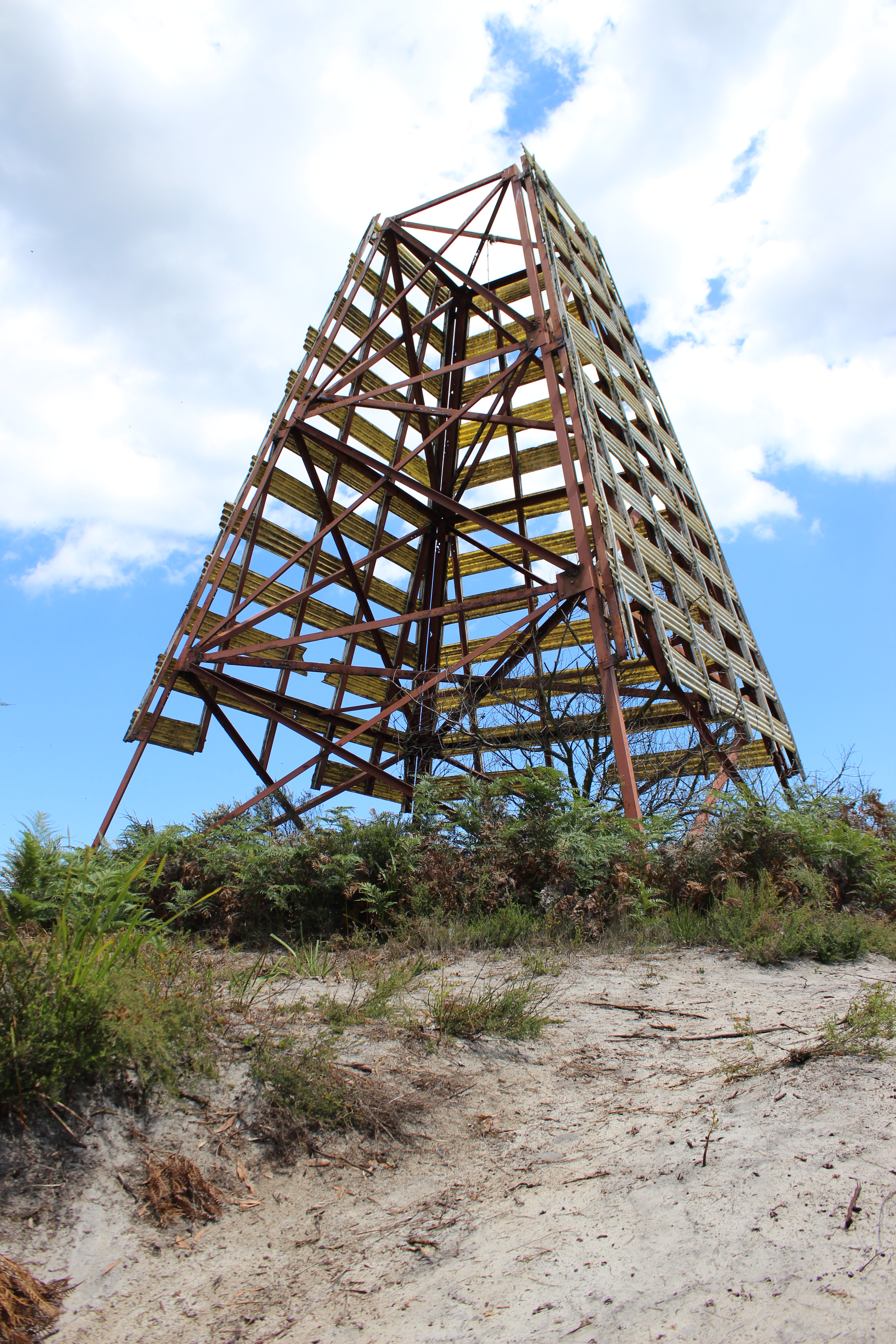
- Former cataphote for maritime navigation, French Island National Park, November 2017

- Location within Victoria
- Location: Victoria
- Nearest city: Melbourne
- Coordinates: 38°19′51″S 145°23′18″E
- Area: 111 km^{2} (43 sq mi)
- Established: 28 June 1998
- Governing body: Parks Victoria
- Website: Official website

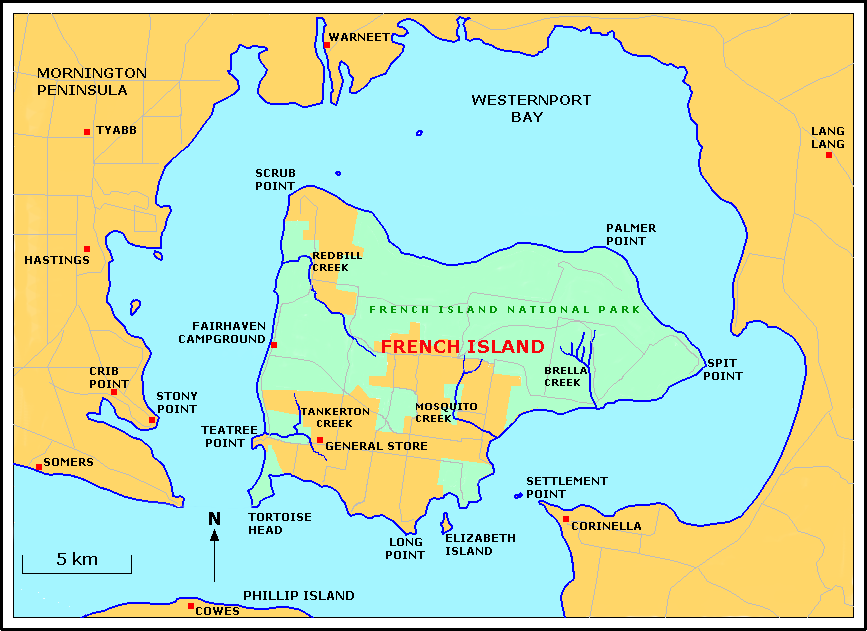
Map of French Island, Victoria, Australia

The French Island National Park is a national park located in the Greater Melbourne region of Victoria, Australia. The 11,100-hectare (27,000-acre) national park is 61 kilometres (38 mi) southeast of Melbourne on French Island within Western Port and accessible only via water.

== Features ==
The park comprises a diverse range of habitats including mangrove salt marshes and open woodland.

The adjacent 2,800-hectare (6,900-acre) French Island Marine National Park complements the French Island National Park by protecting extensive sea grass beds, mangroves and mud flats that provide habitat for fish, waterbirds and invertebrates.

== See also ==
- Protected areas of Victoria
- List of national parks of Australia
