= Joe Island =

Joe Island may refer to:

- Joe Island (Greenland), an uninhabited island in the Nares Strait, Greenland
- Joe Island (Victoria), an uninhabited island in Western Port Bay, Victoria, Australia
