= Ram Island (Victoria) =

Island in Victoria

Coordinates: 38°25′18″S 145°20′56″E

Ram Island is an island in the Western Port of Victoria, Australia, located about 75 kilometers southeast of the state capital Melbourne.

Average annual rainfall is 1251 millimeters. The wettest month is May, with an average of 154 mm precipitation, and the driest is January, with 51 mm of precipitation.
