= Churchill Island Marine National Park =

Protected area in Victoria, Australia

- IUCN category II (national park)
- Location within Victoria
- Location: Victoria
- Nearest city: Rhyll
- Coordinates: 38°30′S 145°19′E
- Area: 6.7 km^{2} (2.6 sq mi)
- Established: 16 November 2002
- Governing body: Parks Victoria
- Website: http://parkweb.vic.gov.au/explore/parks/churchill-island-marine-national-park

The Churchill Island Marine National Park is a protected marine national park located in Western Port, Victoria, Australia. The 670-hectare (1,700-acre) marine park is located south of Rhyll, on the north-eastern shore of Phillip Island, in Western Port.

The marine park extends from Long Point south of the town of Rhyll, to the northern point of Churchill Island and along Churchill Island's western coast to the bridge connecting it to Phillip Island and is part of the Western Port Ramsar site. It is an important roosting and feeding site for migratory waders, especially whimbrels and bar-tailed godwits. Its seagrass habitats are also important for black swans and many species of fish.

== See also ==
- Protected areas of Victoria
