= French Island Marine National Park =

Protected area in Victoria, Australia

- IUCN category II (national park)
- Location within Victoria
- Location: Victoria
- Nearest city: Hastings
- Coordinates: 38°18′S 145°22′E
- Area: 28 km^{2} (11 sq mi)
- Established: 16 November 2002
- Governing body: Parks Victoria
- Website: Official website

The French Island Marine National Park is a protected marine national park in Western Port, Victoria, Australia. The 2,800-hectare (6,900-acre) marine park extends 15 kilometres (9.3 mi) along the north shore of French Island and protects a range of habitats including seagrass beds, mangroves and intertidal mud flats.

== See also ==
- Protected areas of Victoria
- List of national parks of Australia
- Parks Victoria
