= Ronald Monro =

Australian nature and military photographer (1907–1945)

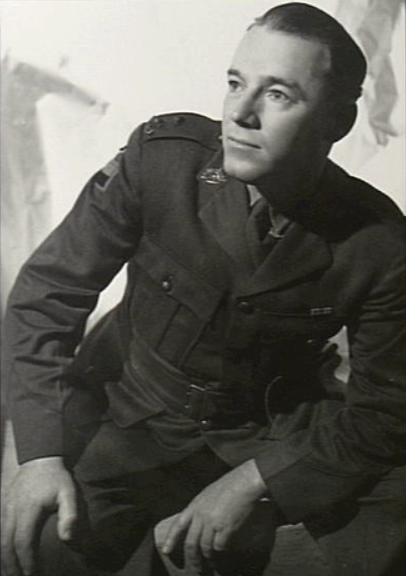
- Monro in 1944
- Born: 1907; Western Australia, Australia
- Died: 4 July 1945 (aged 37–38); Melbourne, Victoria, Australia
- Occupation: Nature photographer
- Children: 1 son

Ronald Keith Monro (1907 – 4 July 1945) was an Australian nature photographer. The Adelaide News called him "one of Australia's most gifted photographers of wild life."

== Biography ==
Monro was born in 1907 in Western Australia where he worked as photographer for the Daily News in Perth before moving to Caulfield, Melbourne in 1933. He worked as a photographer for the Herald and the Sun News-Pictorial. In 1940, he enlisted in the Australian Imperial Force, and in the Middle East he was appointed as official photographer of the 1st Australian Corps. Later, he ran the Melbourne military history unit's photography section.

Monro specialized in studies of birds and was known in particular for his flashlight photography of owls and hawks at night. He was also an environmental advocate; a report he published in a Melbourne newspaper about starving koalas on Quail Island in Victoria was rebutted by Fred Lewis, but led to the relocation of 1,308 of those animals.

Monro became ill and died suddenly in Heidelberg, Melbourne on 4 July 1945, survived by his wife and son. A collection of his photography, Australian Nature Stories, was posthumously published by Robertson and Mullens that year. The West Australian praised the collection as "beautifully presented ... 'Ron' was something more than just a good photographer."
