= Yaringa Marine National Park =

Protected area in Victoria, Australia

- IUCN category II (national park)
- Location within Victoria
- Location: Victoria
- Nearest city: Pearcedale
- Coordinates: 38°14′S 145°16′E
- Area: 9.8 km^{2} (3.8 sq mi)
- Established: 16 November 2002
- Governing body: Parks Victoria
- Website: Official website

The Yaringa Marine National Park is a protected marine national park located in Western Port, Victoria, Australia. The 980-hectare (2,400-acre) marine park is located between the mainland and Quail Island Nature Conservation Reserve, about 52 kilometres (32 mi) southeast of Melbourne. The area comprises saltmarsh, mangroves, sheltered intertidal mudflats, subtidal soft sediments and tidal channels. It is part of the Western Port Ramsar site.
