= Joe Island (Victoria) =

Island in Victoria

Coordinates: 38°17′10″S 145°21′41″E

Joe Island is a very small, uninhabited island located in Western Port Bay, Victoria, Australia, approximately 1 km north of French Island.
