= Sandstone Island =

- Coordinates: 38°19′47″S 145°12′34″E
- Country: Australia
- State: Victoria

Sandstone Island is a small island located approximately one kilometre southeast of the Hastings foreshore in Western Port, Victoria, Australia. Sandstone Island has an area of approximately 19 hectares and is adjacent to Jacks Beach. The island is situated in an area where significant mangrove communities exist. The Island is quite devoid of significant vegetation, however its location in an environmentally significant area in Western Port, places particular emphasis on ensuring appropriate use and development on the Island. The island has been owned by a group of private Sydney buyers since November 2021.

Like French Island, Sandstone Island is an unincorporated area under the direct administration of the government of Victoria, and both are subject to the French Island and Sandstone Island Planning Scheme.

== Ownership history ==
Since the 1990s the island has been owned by a consortium of five Melbourne families, who used it both as an investment and as a weekend holiday location. It was listed for sale in 2015 for $5 million, and then again in 2018, but failed to sell both times. In November 2021, the Herald Sun reported that it had been sold off-the-market to buyers from Sydney for between $5.6 million and $6 million.
