= Elizabeth Island (Victoria) =

Island in Victoria, Australia

- Coordinates: 38°25′0.48″S 145°22′8.4″E
- Country: Australia
- State: Victoria

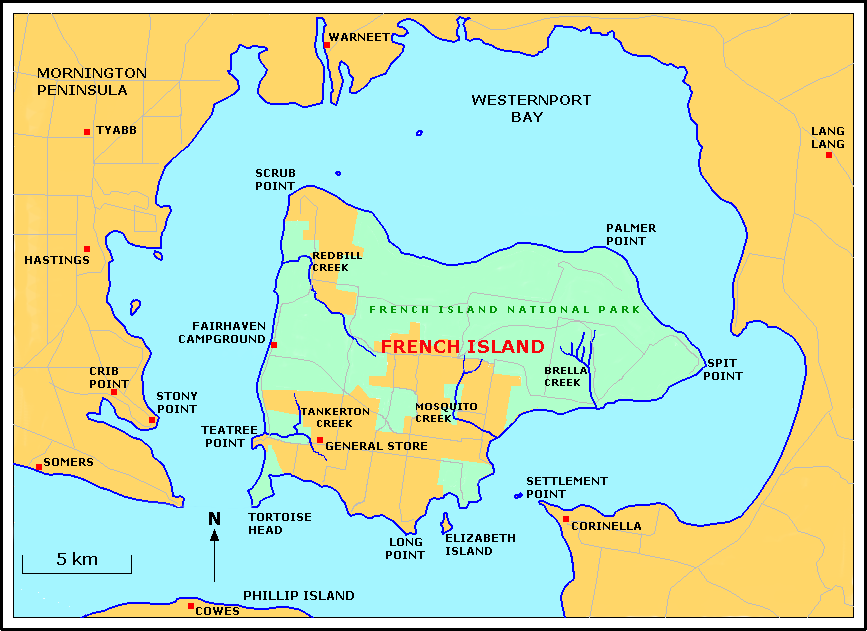
Map of French Island, with much smaller Elizabeth Island close south

Elizabeth Island lies just south of French Island in Western Port, Victoria, south-eastern Australia, and just north of Phillip Island. It is over 65 acres (26 hectares) in area and is an unincorporated area of Victoria, one of the few privately owned, freehold islands in Victoria. Once used for farming, it has been converted into a holiday retreat, with the establishment of a pier and housing facilities. Access is via boat, barge or helicopter.

== Environment ==
The island rises to about 20 metres (66 feet) above sea level, and comprises fertile soil on volcanic rock and sandstone. It is covered mostly in native grass, with areas of native trees and shrubs, and a few large pine trees. There are a variety of bird species on and around the island. The area off the north eastern coast provides a feeding ground for native birds, including swans, when the tide is very low. The white-bellied sea eagle can be seen on the island at times, and nests on nearby French Island. The shoreline consists of pebblestone beach, with small areas of mangroves, sandstone, larger rocks, and some small areas of sand. There are a number of rock pools. The southern part of the island provides constant deep-water access and is close to a deep-water channel where various sea life is found. The island has direct access to Westernport Bay. There is a small rocky peninsula on the south eastern corner of the island, with mangroves and grasses. This area becomes separated at high tide.

== History ==
The island bears the remnants of a shipwreck on its western beach, believed to be the rescue boat off a German ship. A former owner crashed his aeroplane on French Island attempting to view Elizabeth Island, having recently purchased it in a bar.
