= Quail Island (Victoria) =

Island in Victoria, Australia

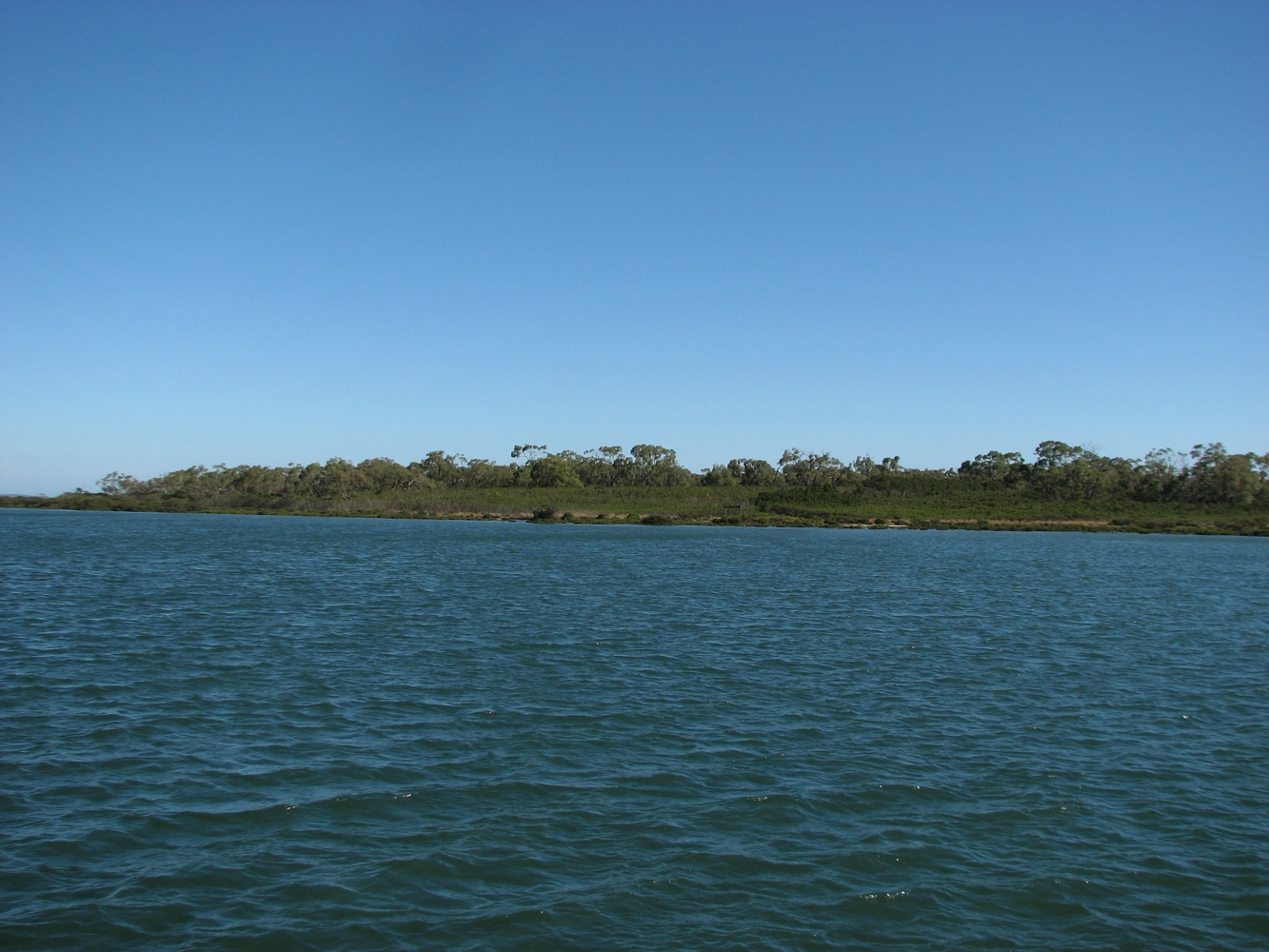
- Quail Island, 2009

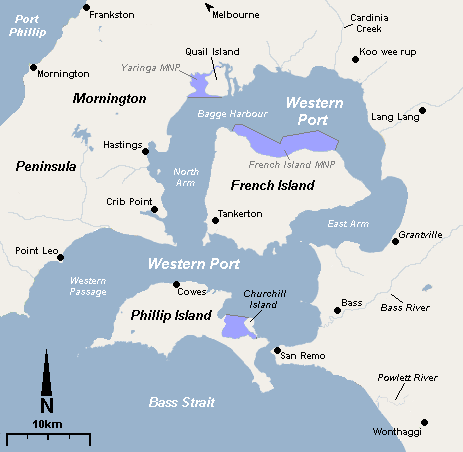
- Map of Western Port

- Location in Victoria

Geography
- Location: Southern Victoria, Australia
- Coordinates: 38°13′57″S 145°17′24″E
- Total islands: 1
- Area: 1,000 ha (2,500 acres)

Quail Island is the third-largest island in Australia's Western Port, after Phillip Island and French Island. The island was listed on the Register of the National Estate, and its wetlands are listed on the Ramsar Convention.

== Overview ==
Quail Island is about 1,000 hectares (2,500 acres) in area, though earlier news reports claimed that it was much larger, up to 1,600 hectares (4,000 acres). Quail Island is connected to the mainland at low tide. North of the island, a tidal creek connects Watson Inlet and Rutherford Inlet. The island itself is uninhabited, the entirety of it being gazetted as Quail Island Nature Conservation Reserve, and in January 2016 as the North Western Port Nature Conservation Reserve. Mangrove surrounds the island, and on its western shore there is a wide salt marsh. There is an undisturbed topography area of Cranbourne sands, and behind the mangroves there are sandy spits and beaches. The island's eastern coastline is offshore from Warneet, from which it may be accessed by boat. There are two seasonal dams located in the centre, one of which was about 100 m (330 ft) long.

Fauna on the island include the southern brown bandicoot, Caspian tern, ruddy turnstone, red fox, and European rabbit. In 2008, a pregnant feral pig was illegally released onto the island, possibly by a hunter; the population grew to about 12–16 pigs by 2018. The pigs caused significant environmental damage, as they preyed on local fauna and their wallowing disturbed the salt marshes. In 2019, Parks Victoria, funded by the Victorian government and the Australian Government's National Landcare Program, escalated efforts to remove all the pigs from the island through poison baiting and shooting. No pigs had been spotted on the island one year later. The island was also once host to a significant, but ill-fated, population of koalas.

== History ==
Since the 1860s, Quail Island was used for grazing. A bridge was built to the mainland around this time—possibly in response to an 1865 article in The Argus recounting a near-death by a housekeeper of Quail Island station:

While Mr. M'Hugh was surveying the creeks ... at the back of Quail Island, he heard a faint noise, something like an effort at a "cooey!" Looking in the direction of the sound ... a poor woman was discovered in a helpless state from hunger, exposure and thirst, lying down in a swampy place, among the mangroves, cold and wet. ... She lost the track, and being short-sighted, could not find it again. ... At last she laid herself down in the scrub, where she was discovered after being three nights in the open air. From the exhausted state she was found in, she would probably not have survived another night, and she was saved by the will of Providence, for the place is quite unfrequented, being among lofty mangroves.

Throughout the 1880s, several people suggested that Quail Island be used for "turning out partridges and other game," for military purposes, and, in 1909, as a labour site for unemployed men, though none of these proposals happened. In the early 20th century, then-acting chief inspector of fisheries and game Fred Lewis asked the Land Department to turn the island into a preserve, calling it a refuge for wildlife and citing the variety of fauna on the island: "silver gulls, kangaroos, magpies, opossums, plover, bronze-winged pigeons, quail, wallabies and black swans." On 13 March 1928, due to Lewis's urging, the island was declared a sanctuary. The West Australian wrote in 1933 that the island had thus become the "only native settlement in the world where animals are permitted to thrive undisturbed in their natural sanctuary".

=== Koala population ===
Lewis took a particular interest in koalas and their potential extinction. In 1930, 165 koalas were transferred to Quail Island from French Island, where the animals had been introduced several decades prior. However, many koalas reportedly died in a 1936 fire, believed to be set by a farmer, and in later years contradictory accounts were released about the animals' well-being. A particularly sensational report by writer and photographer Ronald Monro recounted a scene of near-bare trees and near-starving koalas:

Hundreds of starving bears, many with little babies clinging to their backs, were sitting up dead trees or slowly moving about in search of food. In some trees, where there were still a few stray leaves, bears were fighting for the meagre meal. Some bears were walking aimlessly about on the ground, too exhausted to climb any more."

This account was seized upon by naturalists, but authorities including Lewis argued that the koalas were, in fact, healthy. In 1944, a film of Quail Island's dismal conditions was shown in a Melbourne theatre. Herbert Hyland, then the Chief Secretary of Victoria, denounced the film, calling it misleading, and the government even made efforts to suppress and censor the film so that people outside Australia would not see it. The authorities finally conceded, and in 1944, 1,308 living koalas were captured and taken off Quail Island. The island's koala population never reached its 1930s peak again.
