= Western Port =

Bay in Victoria, Australia

- Warn Marin / Western Port Bay
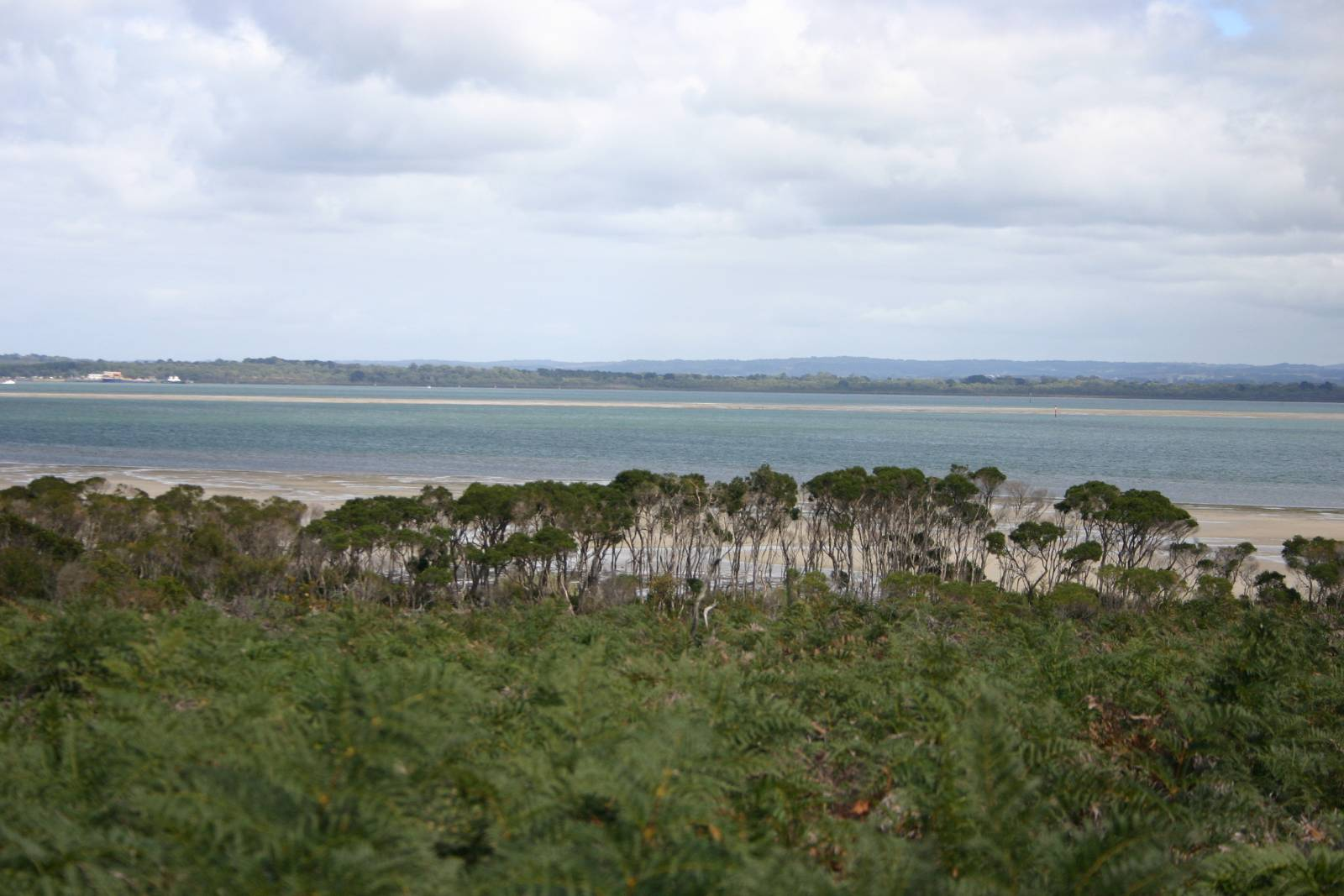
- Western Port from French Island.

- Location in Victoria

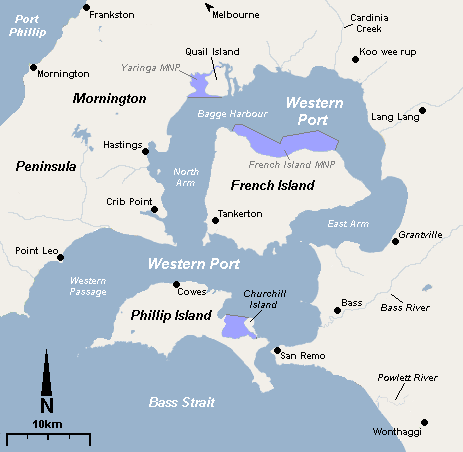
- Map of Western Port
- Location: Southern Victoria
- Coordinates: 38°22′S 145°20′E
- Type: Saline, Permanent, Natural
- Primary inflows: Bunyip River, Lang Lang River, Bass River, Cardinia Creek
- Primary outflows: Bass Strait
- Basin countries: Australia
- Max. length: 263 km (163 mi)
- Surface area: 680 km^{2} (260 sq mi)
- Average depth: 6 m (20 ft)
- Max. depth: 25 m (82 ft)
- Surface elevation: 0 m (0 ft)
- Frozen: never
- Islands: Phillip Island, French Island, Quail Island, Churchill Island
- Settlements: Hastings, Tooradin, San Remo, Cowes

Ramsar Wetland
- Designated: 15 December 1982
- Reference no.: 267

Western Port, (Boonwurrung: Warn Marin) commonly but unofficially known as Western Port Bay, is a large tidal bay in southern Victoria, Australia, opening into Bass Strait. It is the second largest bay in the state. Geographically, it is dominated by two large islands; French Island and Phillip Island. At the time it was renamed, its position was west of other known ports and bays, but Western Port has become something of a misnomer as it lies just to the east of the larger Port Phillip and the city of Melbourne. It is visited by Australian fur seals, whales and dolphins, as well as many migratory waders and seabirds. It is listed under the Ramsar Convention as a wetland of international significance.

The area around the bay and the two main islands were originally part of the Boonwurrung nation's territory prior to European settlement. Western Port was first seen by Europeans in 1798 when an exploration crew in a whaleboat led by George Bass, journeyed south from Sydney to explore Australia's south eastern coastline. Due in most part to a lack of food, the expedition was halted, spending two weeks in Western Port before returning to Sydney. As it was the most westerly charted point at the time, it was named Western Port.

The bay is home to the three Marine National Parks—French Island, Churchill Island and Yaringa, while the land adjacent to the north is largely used for farming purposes including cattle and wineries. Today the bay is mostly used for recreation; however, there is also a military base (HMAS Cerberus), shipping and oil production facilities adjoining the bay. Western Port is around one hour from Melbourne by car and a small number of holiday villages with sandy swimming beaches lie on its shores.

== History ==
Prior to British colonisation, the Boonwurrung people lived around Warn Marin living off shellfish, mutton birds and plant life. The bay was first explored by Europeans in 1797, when George Bass received permission from Governor Hunter in Sydney to sail a whaleboat along the unexplored section of coast south of Botany Bay. On such a rough stretch of water, Bass could not get more than halfway through the strait now known as Bass Strait. This voyage led to the recording of Western Port, so named because of its situation relative to every other known harbour on the coast at that time (the area from Point Hicks to Cape Howe), even though it lies to the east of Port Phillip and the city of Melbourne.

=== Sealing colony ===
From around 1801, the Boonwurrung people, living along the Western Port coast, had their livelihoods affected by seal hunters. The sealers' abduction of Boonwurrung men and women to work as slaves and provide sexual gratification, caused massive upheaval to their social structure.

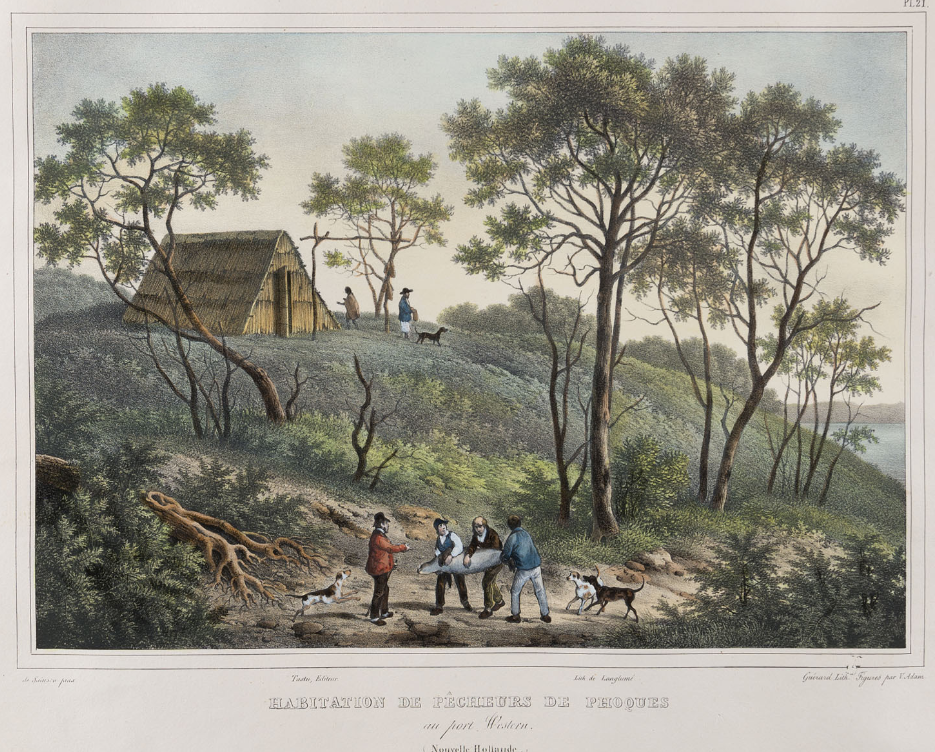
Habitation de Pecheurs de Phoques au Port Western (Sealers' hut at Western Port) painted by Louis Auguste de Sainson in 1833

By 1826, Phillip Island was a permanent base for sealers and a report by the French explorer, Jules Dumont d'Urville in 1830, attributed the absence of Boonwurrung on Phillip Island, to the violent methods of the sealers in abducting local people. Sealers such as Thomas Hamilton and Old Scott lived seasonally at Western Port for years with Indigenous women abducted both locally and from Van Diemen's Land.

As late as 1836, several bloody raiding attacks by sealers on Boonwurrung clans at Western Port resulted in the abduction of at least four young women and a number of children.

Contact with sealers also exposed the coastal tribes to European diseases, and this exercised a heavy impact on the demographics, and the economic and social ties binding the Boonwurrung people.

=== Attempted military outpost ===
In the year 1826 it was reported that the French had resolved to found a settlement at some Australian harbour – probably King George's Sound or Western Port. The British Government at once sent instructions to Sydney for Governor Ralph Darling to take possession of these places. As a result, Colonel Stewart, Captain S. Wright, and Lieutenant Burchell were sent in HMS Fly (Captain Wetherall) and the brigs Dragon and Amity, with orders to proceed to Western Port, on 18 November 1826. They took a number of convicts and a small force composed of detachments of the 3rd and 93rd regiments. The expedition landed at Settlement Point, on the eastern side of the bay near present-day Corinella, which was the headquarters until the abandonment of Western Port at the instance of Governor Darling about twelve months afterwards, as unfit for civilisation,

=== Colonisation ===
Samuel Anderson established the third permanent European settlement in Victoria, after Portland and Melbourne, at Bass in 1835.

It was only after the end of World War II that serious consideration was given to the development of the port, and its flat shores north of Stony and Crib Points have become a centre for heavy industry.

== Geography ==
Formerly a major river drainage system, it was inundated together with Port Phillip by the rising sea in the Holocene period; the Western Port sunkland now forms an extensive tidal bay. The waters of Western Port cover an area of 680 km² of which 270 km² are exposed as mud flats at low tide. The topography of Western Port is dominated by two large islands: French Island and Phillip Island. The coastline, including that of the islands, is some 263 km. The bay and its islands are criss-crossed by seven seismically active fault lines and experiences numerous minor earthquakes every year.

In the northern reaches, several rivers and creeks drain into the bay and flow through extensive mangroves, mudflats and sand banks before being channelled either side of French Island and into the open water in the southern reaches around Phillip Island. Several natural river paths and channels provide access for boats to the northern reaches; however, this is highly dependent on the tides and local knowledge is essential. Some of the major tributaries of Western Port are Bunyip River, Lang Lang River, Bass River, Cardinia Creek, Redbill Creek, Mosquito Creek, Brella Creek and Tankerton Creek. Until the mid 20th century, the Koo-Wee-Rup Swamp adjoined the bay in the north, covering an area of 30–40 thousand hectares, extending inland to present-day Pakenham, prior to cultivation of the land by early settlers. The mangroves in the northern reaches are the only remnants of this swamp today.

=== Islands ===
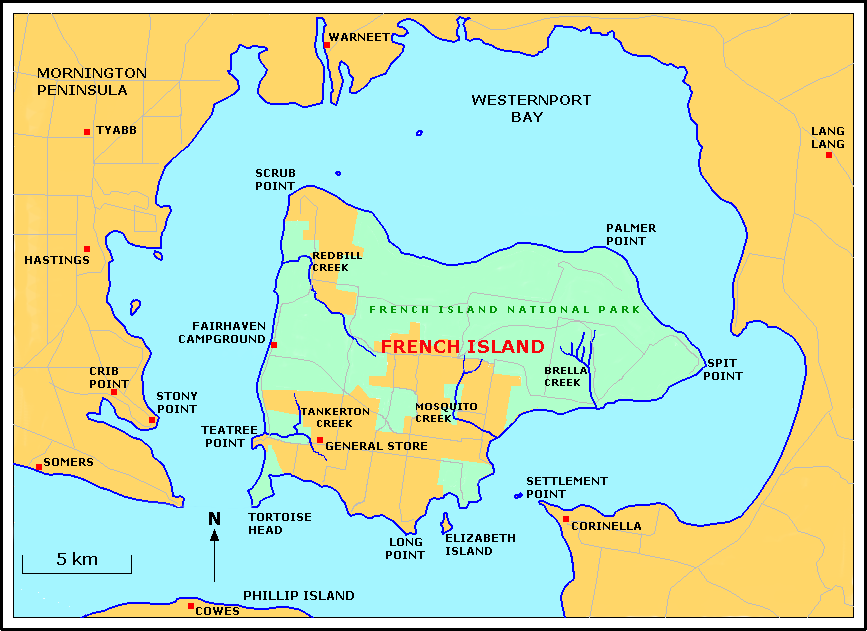
Northern Western Port and French Island

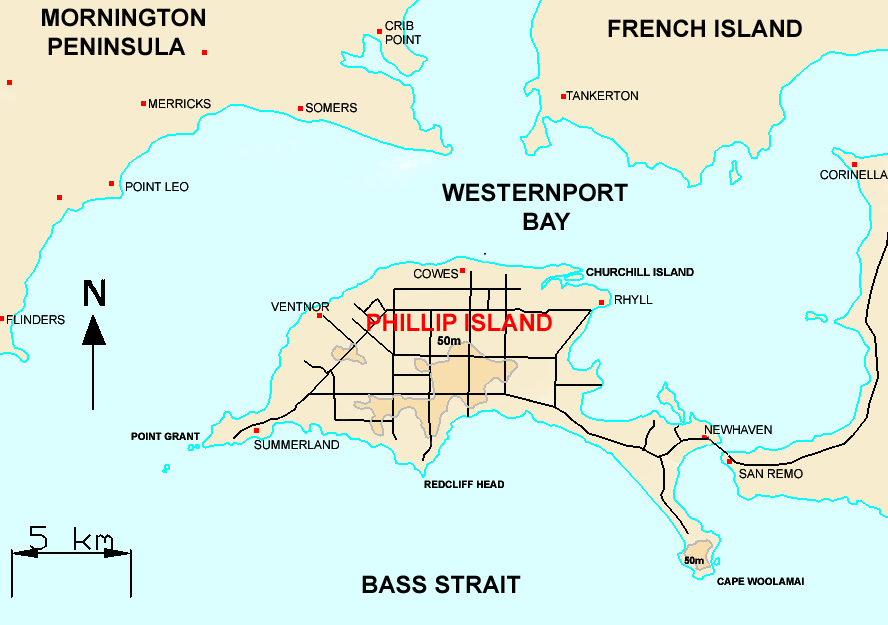
Southern Western Port and Phillip Island

Western Port contains two large islands and several small ones; in approximate order of size:

- French Island - 170 km² (population: 116)
- Phillip Island - 100 km² (population: 9,000)
- Middle Spit - exposed at low tide
- Quail Island
- Tortoise Head Bank - exposed at low tide
- Churchill Island - 57 ha
- Chinaman Island
- Elizabeth Island
- Sandstone Island
- Reef Island
- Long Island
- Snapper Rock
- Pelican Island
- Barrallier Island
- Ram Island
- Joe Island

== Ecology ==
=== Flora ===
Western Port supports a mosaic of habitat types including underwater seagrass beds, intertidal rock platforms, sandy beaches, intertidal mudflats, tidal channels, saltmarshes and mangroves. The coastline around Phillip Island is of State significance because of its remnant coastal tussock grasslands and dune scrub, a rare vegetation community in Victoria.

=== Fauna ===
Western Port consists of rocky platforms, sandy beaches and marine habitats. It is home to a diverse range of invertebrates including colonial ascidians, sponges and corals. Mudflats and mangrove swamps around the northern end of the bay support a large number of invertebrates that are an important food source for waders and visiting migratory birds. French Island is home to migratory waders, Australian pelicans, short-tailed shearwater rookeries, and many other significant fauna species. The bay has been identified as a 623 km^{2} Important Bird Area (IBA) by BirdLife International because it regularly supports small numbers of critically endangered orange-bellied parrots, over 1% of the world populations of Far Eastern curlews, red-necked stints and pied oystercatchers, and declining numbers of vulnerable fairy terns.

Phillip Island Penguin Reserve has the largest colony of little penguins in Victoria as well as a major colony of short-tailed shearwaters, with breeding hooded plovers and peregrine falcons. Seal Rock off Phillip Island is home to the largest colony of Australian fur seals and a breeding site of kelp gulls and sooty oystercatchers. San Remo's marine community is a rich assemblage of marine biota listed under the State Flora and Fauna Guarantee Act, 1988. The bay is listed under the Ramsar Convention for its internationally important wetlands.

The Moonlit Sanctuary Wildlife Conservation Park situated near the north western corner of the bay in Pearcedale offers a close up look at some of the indigenous mammals and birds of the region.

In recent years, the number of whale sightings (mostly southern right and humpback) has increased; local institutes conduct research of their presence in the bay and the neighbouring Port Phillip Bay and ask the public to report sightings.

=== Environment monitoring ===
Western Port's marine water is monitored by the Environment Protection Authority of Victoria and was considered Good over the 2021-2022 period.

== Parklands ==
- Land:

Coolart Wetlands and Homestead Reserve
French Island National Park
Langwarrin Flora and Fauna Reserve
Mornington Peninsula National Park

- Marine:

French Island National Park - 2,800ha
Yaringa Marine National Park - 980ha
Churchill Island Marine National Park - 670ha

== Recreation ==
Fishing, pleasure boating and yachting are some of the popular pastimes on the bay.

=== Recreation on Phillip Island ===
- Penguin Reserve - visited at dusk to watch the penguins return to their burrows in the sand dunes
- Seal Rocks - viewed through binoculars
- Koala Conservation Centre
- Bird watching
- Scenic Flights from Philip Island Airport (Located on Cape Woolamai)

=== Recreation on French Island ===
- Bushwalking or bird observing; bush orchid and fishing areas; horse riding, bike rides, and deep water fishing
- Koala habitat
- Camping

== Shipping and boating ==
Deep channels lead from Bass Strait into the western section of the bay, giving access to the region's port facilities. The town of Hastings is the main boat landing in the bay with the Yaringa Marina at Somerville also offering boat harbor facilities.

There are boat launching ramps at:
Stony Point -Concrete 3 lane ramp, 2 holding jetties, All Tides
Blind Bight -Tarmac Single lane ramp, Holding Jetty, High Tide
Corinella -Concrete 2 lane ramp, 2 Holding jetties, All Tides
Hastings - Concrete 4 lane ramp, Holding Jetty, All Tides
There are also ramps at Tooradin, Newhaven, Cowes, Warneet, Lang Lang, Grantville, Flinders, and Rhyll (Phillip Island).

Western Port Ferries operates between Stony Point, French Island, and Phillip Island

The boundary between the coastal waters of Bass Strait and the enclosed waters of Western Port is defined on the western side by a line from West Head on the Mornington Peninsula to Black Rock, Phillip Island. Then from Black Rock to the tip of Point Grant at The Nobbies on Phillip Island. On the eastern side, it's a line from the southeastern tip of Cape Woolami, Phillip Island to Griffiths Point on the Bass Coast. Source: Western Port Recreational Boating Guide: sixth edition, June 2021.

== Coast Guard Flotillas ==
- Coast Guard Western Port

== Industry and Port Operations ==
=== Established Operations ===
Western Port has several industrial complexes, including a BlueScope steel processing works and the major Royal Australian Navy training base, HMAS Cerberus. The Westernport Oil Refinery was operated by BP at Crib Point from 1966 to 1985.

The Port of Hastings Corporation, is the responsible public entity for operating in the Port of Hastings, including maintaining the associated port infrastructure. Port assets include the Stony Point Jetty and Depot, Crib Point Jetty, Long Island Point Jetty and the BlueScope Wharves (Owned by BlueScope).

=== Proposed Victorian Renewable Energy Terminal ===
On September 10 2023, the Victorian State Government announced that the Port of Hastings is the preferred location for the establishment of a dedicated assembly port (the Victorian Renewable Energy Terminal) to support the construction of Victoria's first offshore wind farms along the Victorian coast.

The Victorian Renewable Energy Terminal is proposed at the Old Tyabb Reclamation Area (OTRA) and the adjacent marine area. The OTRA is a 25-hectare land area located in the existing port precinct between the Esso's Long Island Point jetty and the BlueScope Steel wharves.

Once operational, the site would be equipped for the receival, assembly and installation of offshore wind foundations, towers and turbines as a multi-user facility, with berthing facilities, heavy duty pavements and major supporting infrastructure.

== Previous Industrial Proposals ==
=== AGL Gas Import Jetty ===
In 2018, AGL Energy and APA Group (Australia) jointly proposed the construction of a gas import jetty at Crib Point, as well as a 56 km high pressure gas pipeline to connect the jetty to the existing gas transmission network in Pakenham. The proposal was met with heavy protest from conservation groups and residents of the area due to the environmental impact and the proposal was rejected by the Victorian government on March 29, 2021 due to the "unacceptable impacts on the Western Port environment and the Ramsar wetlands"

=== Container Port Terminal ===
The proposal for a major container port at Western Port was formally initiated in the late 1960s and 1970s, with successive Victorian governments identifying it as the preferred site for Melbourne's second terminal due to its naturally deep waters and existing industrial zoning.

The project gained significant momentum in 2013 when the state government allocated $110 million for detailed planning and environmental approvals to address the long-term capacity limits of the Port of Melbourne.

However, following a comprehensive multi-year review by Infrastructure Victoria, the proposal was effectively relocated to the Bay West site (in Port Phillip) in May 2017.

== Regulations ==
For the protection of the marine environment, a number of activities are prohibited within the boundaries of Victoria's Marine National Parks and Marine Sanctuaries. No fishing, netting, spearing, taking or killing of marine life. All methods of fishing, from the shore or sea, are prohibited. No taking or damaging of animals, plants and objects or artefacts. There are strong penalties under the National Parks Act for fishing in Marine National Parks and Sanctuaries. All offenses can by reported to the Department of Primary Industries.

However, you may carry fin-fish on board your boat within park boundaries if you caught the fish outside the parks and you may also carry but not use, a fishing rod or spear gun. You may also have abalone or rock lobster associated equipment on board the boat provided that you are travelling straight through the park by the shortest practicable route.

== See also ==
- Mornington Peninsula and Western Port Biosphere Reserve
