= French Island (Victoria) =

Island in Victoria, Australia

French Island Bellarmarin (Boonwurrung)
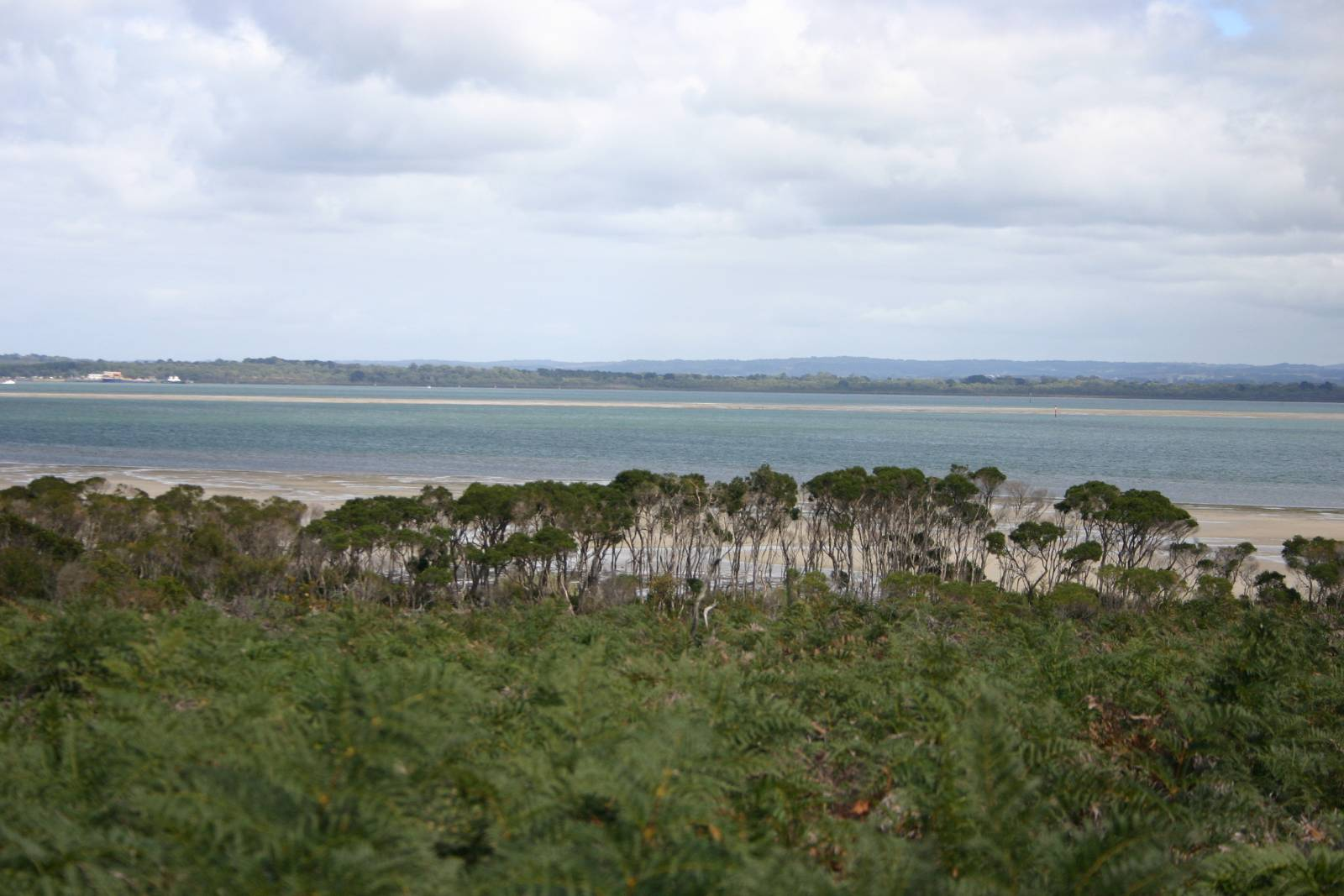
- Looking west over Western Port to Mornington Peninsula from the coast road

- Coordinates: 38°21′00″S 145°22′12″E
- Country: Australia
- State: Victoria
- LGA: Unincorporated area

Government
  - State electorate: Hastings
  - Federal division: Flinders

Area
  - Total: 170 km^{2} (66 sq mi)

Population
  - Total: 141 (SAL 2021)
- Postcode: 3921

French Island (Boonwurrung: Bellarmarin, Woone, or Jouap) is the largest coastal island of Victoria, Australia. Compared with Philip Island and areas on the surrounding mainland, French Island is isolated and undeveloped. There are no water or electricity mains or medical services on the island. There is one small general store and post office located on Tankerton Road about 3 km (1.9 mi) from Tankerton Jetty, and a small school. Many of the locals actively promote environmental tourism. Visitor accommodation includes camping, bed and breakfast, guesthouse, and farmstay.

The population was recorded as 139 in 2021. The island is an unincorporated area under the direct administration of the Government of Victoria. Around 70 per cent of the island is covered by French Island National Park, and the waters directly north of it are protected as a marine park, the French Island Marine National Park.

== History ==
According to the French Island Community Association, prior to British colonisation, French Island was a hunting ground of the Bunurong people. They lived on the mainland and travelled to French Island to collect shellfish and swan eggs. There are several registered sites on the island that consist of shell middens and stone scatters they left behind. The name of the island in Boonwurrung is Bellarmarin, Woone, or Jouap.

In April 1802, a French expedition ship Naturaliste under Jacques Hamelin, part of the Baudin expedition to Australia, explored the area. Hamelin named the island "Île de Françoise" (Island of Francoise), which was corrupted as French Island.

The first recorded settlers on the island were William and John Gardiner in 1847, who had the first pastoral lease and grazed 8,000 sheep. The first land subdivision was in 1867, when 4,733 acres (1,915 ha) were divided into 14 allotments. The first land sales took place in 1873 with the minimum price £1 per acre.

In the 1880s, koalas were introduced to the island for conservation purposes, after the mainland population had been decimated by habitat clearance and hunting for the fur trade.

During the 1890s depression, the government encouraged settlement of the area and established seven village settlements on French Island under the Village Settlement Scheme. These were called Energy, Star of Hope, Callanan's, Perseverance, Industrial, Kiernan's and Grant Homestead Association. Altogether about 200 people made up these settlements. Tankerton Post Office opened on 3 September 1890 and remained open until 1994. It reopened in 2001 under the name French Island. A Fairhaven post office was also open from 1911 until 1957. Four schools were built of which the Perseverance Primary School, established in 1896, is the only one remaining and now caters for only a small number of primary school children.

John Ratford introduced chicory to the island, after he spent a season learning about it on Phillip Island in 1895. The Chicory industry became the main source of income on the island for over 70 years with extensive chicory planting and some 30 chicory kilns established. The last chicory crop was harvested in the 1980s. The Bayview chicory kiln, the second and now the oldest remaining on the island, was built in 1896-97 and is as of April 2017 a cafe and museum.

McLeod prison farm opened on 17 July 1916 and occupied 222 hectares and operated as a self-sustaining farm. Timber cabins housed the prisoners until 1946 when concrete cells were built. The prison closed in 1975 and was used as a holiday camp facility until 1995. Later it operated as an eco-village until it was bought in 2017 for $4 million by a Chinese-based company with plans to turn it into a major tourism operation.

In 1967, at the request of state Premier Henry Bolte, the State Electricity Commission of Victoria proposed the island as the site of the first nuclear power plant in Australia; these plans were ultimately abandoned. During the 1960s and 1970s BHP, Hooker Rex and the State Electricity Commission paid inflated prices for land, inducing land owners to sell up and move off the island.

In July 1997, 11,050 hectares (27,300 acres), about 70% of the island was declared French Island National Park, and in May 2002 the waters directly north of French Island were declared the French Island Marine National Park.

== Geography ==
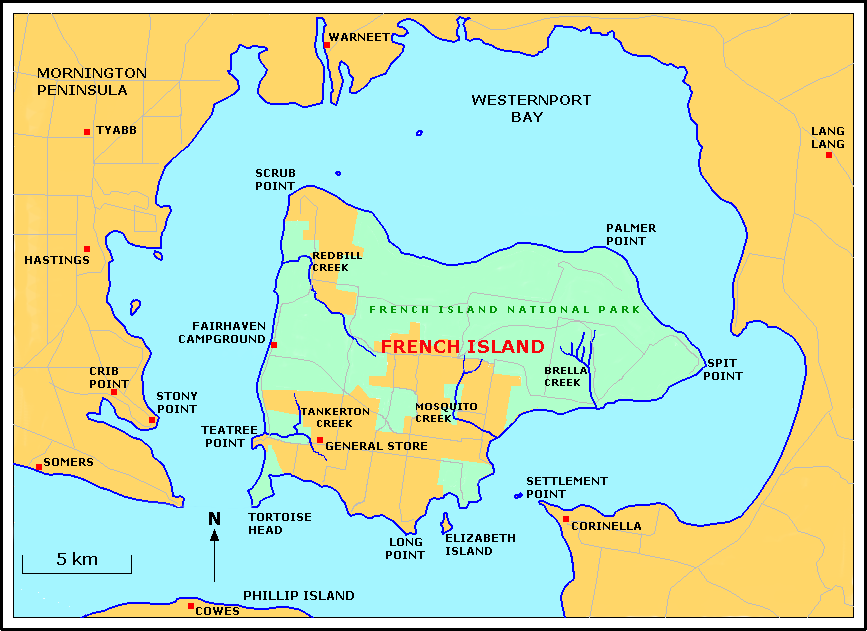
French Island, with Elizabeth Island on south; National Park areas in green

French Island sits within a tectonic depression known as the Western Port sunkland.

French Island has a few notable landforms, including:

- Mount Wellington – highest point on the island at about 96 m
- The Pinnacles – 66 m
- Harrop Hill
- Tortoise Head
- Spit Point

Watercourses on the island include:

- Tankerton Creek
- Redbill Creek
- Mosquito Creek
- Brella Creek

As the only community on the island, Tankerton is the only place on the island where necessities like food and cars can be obtained.

== Governance and demographics ==
In the 2021 Australian census, the population was recorded as 139, with a median age of 52 years.

The island is an unincorporated area under the direct administration of the Government of Victoria, and is a declared locality of Victoria having its own postcode. Community issues are dealt with by the French Island Community Association. In 1997, about 70% of the island was declared the French Island National Park, administered by Parks Victoria, and was listed in the former Register of the National Estate in 1984. Together with two nearby privately-owned islands, Elizabeth Island and Sandstone Island, it is administered directly by the Victorian Government.

Services that would normally be provided by a council are the responsibility of other authorities or community groups:

- Maintenance of roads and roadsides is carried out by Forest Fire Management Victoria.
- The Bass Coast Shire's Environmental Health division is responsible for food safety of commercial premises and septic tank permits.
- The Minister for Planning maintains planning powers over the island.
- The French Island Community Association operates a rubbish tip on the island.
- Community members maintain the French Island Recreation Reserve and its facilities.

In addition, Parks Victoria has a staffed depot on the island.

== Facilities ==
The island has a primary school, Perseverance Primary School, on The Centre Way. In 2003 it had ten students. In 2009 five students were enrolled. According to ACARA, in 2011 there were nine enrolments. In 2018, Perseverance Primary had seven students taught by one teacher and a teacher's aide.

=== Natural environment ===
Habitats range from coastal mangroves, swamps, heath, grasslands and blue gum forests.

French Island provides the world's densest and most disease-free population of koalas, with regular transfer of excess koalas to repopulate diseased areas on the mainland, and the population is now (2026) over-abundant. In Victoria, they are over-grazing in Cape Otway and French Island.

Shelter is provided for more than 100 species of bush orchids, and 260 species of birds. Significant species on the island include: king quail, the critically endangered orange-bellied parrot, fairy tern, white-bellied sea eagle, swamp skink, long-nosed potoroo.

The island is one of only two places in Victoria where the invasive red fox is not present, which has enabled the island to maintain a variety of indigenous species which have been devastated by the predator elsewhere including Phillip Island. However rabbits, feral cats, feral goats, feral pigs, Indian mynahs and starlings pose a threat to the island's biodiversity.

The Ross River virus has been identified on French Island.

== Access and transport ==
=== Ferry ===
The main access to the island is the Western Port Ferries passenger ferry running several services daily from Stony Point pier to Tankerton Jetty and Cowes on Phillip Island. Metro Trains run a service to Stony Point railway station via Frankston railway station. Most trains arriving at Stony Point connect with the ferry service to both French Island and Phillip Island throughout the day. The ferry does not carry vehicles but car parking is provided on the Stony Point foreshore. The crossing takes about 15 minutes.

The French Island Barge Company operates a vehicular ferry from Corinella on the eastern side of Western Port to the barge landing on French Island. It accommodates two standard size cars or a larger truck. All supplies to the island come by the Barge, which runs every day of the year, depending on tide and appointments.

=== Air ===
There is no airport on the island, although a few properties have private landing strips.

=== Road ===
There are more than 40 km of unsealed gravel roads and tracks on the island, which are quiet and ideal for mountain bikes. They are affected by rain and can become dangerous for the inexperienced. The island is generally flat or mildly undulating with the highest point being Mount Wellington (96 m above sea level). Bicycles and cars can be hired from the general store. There is an abundance of walking tracks. Active pursuits include bushwalking, bird watching, horse riding, geocaching and cycling.

== Camping ==
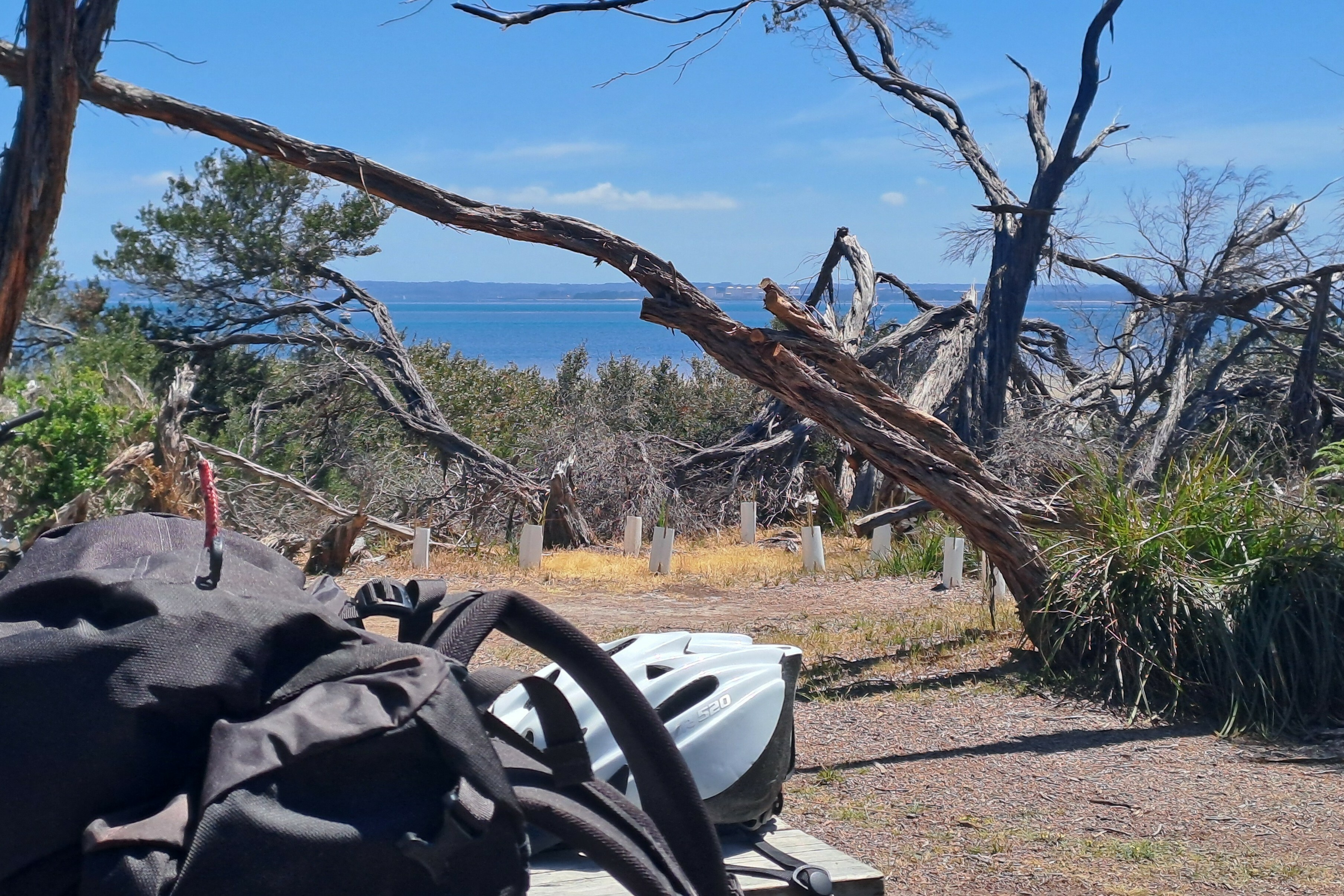
A campsite at Fairhaven Campground

The Fairhaven Campground is the only public campground on French Island. It is located in the National Park, 5 km up the coast from Tankerton Jetty (where the ferry arrives from Stony Point). The campground is set among trees near the beach, with picnic tables, a barbecue, pit toilets and a water tank. While the site is free, advance booking is required. Other camping is available at "private sites" at French Island Eco Inn, Camping with Koalas and through the local French Island tour operator.

== Proposed nuclear power plant site ==
In mid 1967, the State Electricity Commission of Victoria (SECV) applied to the Lands Department for the reservation of 400 acres (1.6 km^{2}) of French Island for future construction of a nuclear power plant. The plant was speculated to have 350-500MW generator capacity and would likely have been built during the 1970s. Other plants around Australia were also envisioned, contingent on a successful, fully operational plant in Victoria. If the SECV did decide to construct a nuclear power station, it would have continued to construct brown coal power stations as well for some considerable time.

Due to the low cost of brown coal in Victoria and mounting pressure from the anti-nuclear movement, the SEC subsequently decided against commissioning a nuclear plant and instead continued the commissioning of brown coal plants. These included the Hazelwood Power Station, which was completed in 1971. Nuclear plants were not constructed in NSW as access to black coal allowed for bigger generators. The declaration of various areas of many Australian states as nuclear free zones was a key factor in the selection of coal plants over nuclear plants.

In 1982, the Cain Labor government in Victoria legislated to ban the building of nuclear power plants in the state. In 1985, the SECV announced that its land at Red Bluff would be transferred to the National Parks service. This took place at a time when ferry services to the island had become unreliable, with the two small vessels (King Fisher and Port Hunter) breaking down regularly. Because of the unreliability of access, land in the area was sold in 60 and 90 acre allotments for just $1,000 per acre.

== In popular culture ==
- Jamie Blanks' 2007 horror film Storm Warning was set on French Island; its dialogue includes numerous references to its geography.

== See also ==
- Sandstone Island
- Mornington Peninsula and Western Port Biosphere Reserve
