= Tenby Point =

- Town
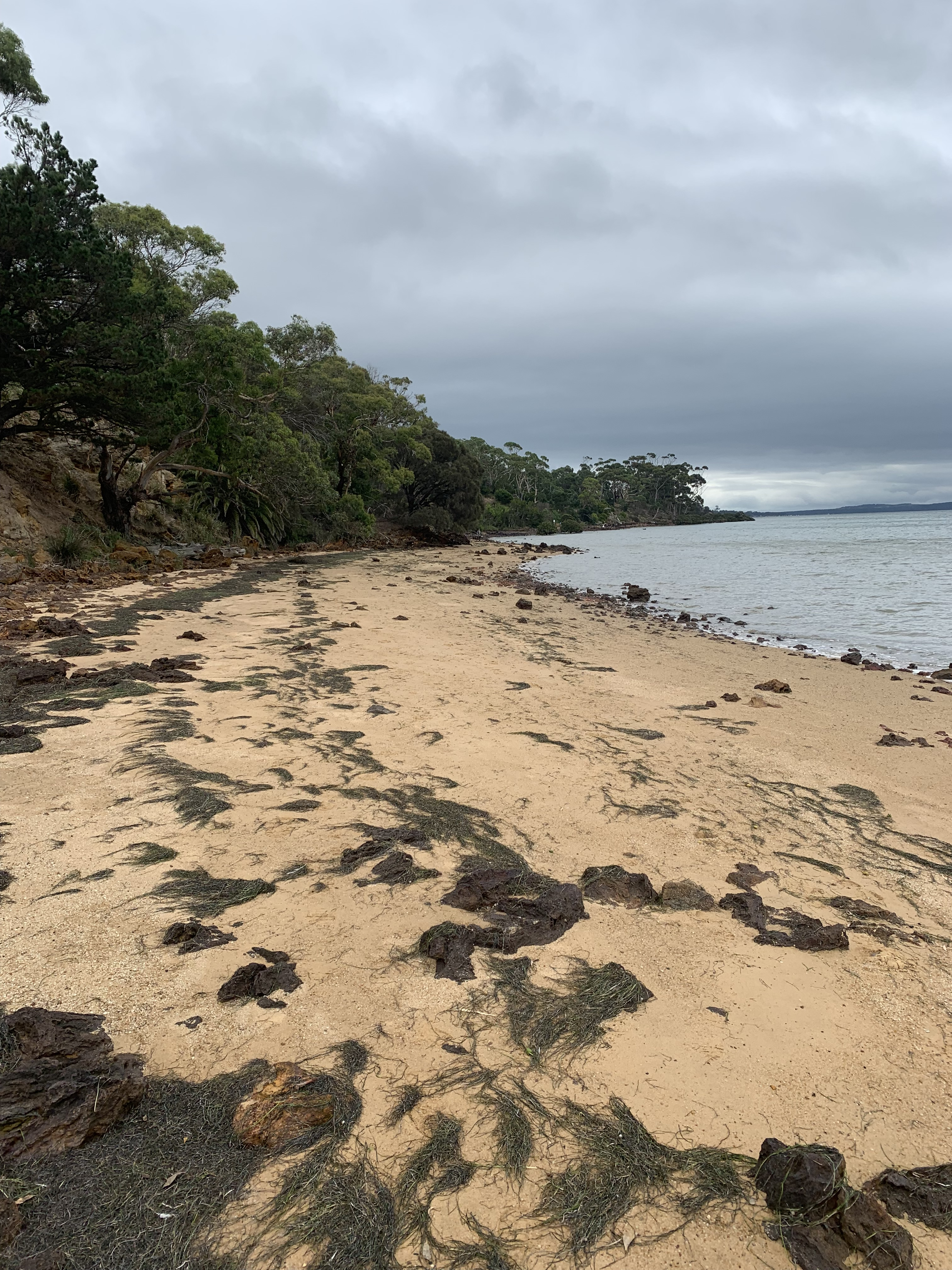
- Beach at Tenby Point

- Coordinates: 38°24′51″S 145°28′36″E
- Country: Australia
- State: Victoria
- LGA: Bass Coast Shire

Government
  - State electorate: Bass
  - Federal division: Monash

Population
  - Total: 184 (2016 census)
- Postcode: 3984

Tenby Point is a small town located in Bass Coast Shire in Victoria, Australia.

== Geography ==
Tenby Point is situated east of the township of Corinella, north-east of Coronet Bay and south-west of Grantville.

Tenby Point is a linear village consisting of four main streets: Guy Road running along the town's southern boundary, Bayview Avenue running up the town, Marine Parade running across the north of the town, and Park Lane running through the left side of the town. The town is built around Bayview Avenue, which is the longest street in the town and runs from the southern end of the town to the beach access point.

Beach access can be obtained from Marine Parade.

Tenby Point is surrounded by farmland.

== Landmarks ==
The remnants of an old jetty can be found along the beach.
