= Summerlands, Victoria =

Summerlands
- Town
- Coordinates: 38°30′40″S 145°8′46″E
- Country: Australia
- State: Victoria
- LGA: Bass Coast Shire
- Location: 149 km (93 mi) SE of Melbourne; 50 km (31 mi) W of Wonthaggi; 14 km (8.7 mi) W of Cowes

Government
  - State electorate: Bass
  - Federal division: Monash

Population
  - Total: 0 (SAL 2016)
- Postcode: 3922

Summerlands is a locality and group of former residential subdivisions on Phillip Island in Victoria, Australia, located in the south-west corner of the island, close to a little penguin breeding colony. In 1985, the Victorian government decided that, to protect the penguin rookery, further development of the subdivision would be prohibited and all the properties would be progressively purchased by the state. Summerlands beach is one of four beaches that forms part of the National Surfing Reserve on the island, along with Smiths Beach, Cape Woolamai and Cat Bay.

== History ==
In the early 20th century, the Summerland Peninsula had remained relatively untouched by European settlement compared to the rest of the island. Although chicory, mustard and oats for horse fodder were grown there, the land was of minimal pastoral or agricultural value. As a result, the penguin colony there survived while others on the island did not.

Subdivision of the area was carried out from the 1920s until the 1960s. The first comprised 12 large allotments, along with features such as a roundabouts and cypress trees. Between 1927 and 1931, developer Spencer Jackson subdivided 227 new blocks and from 1929 to 1940, there was a nine-hole golf course on what is now the Penguin Parade car park.

Beginning in the mid-1950s and continuing well into the next decade, a further 437 blocks were subdivided by successful Melbourne estate agent Keith Mann as the "Summerlands" and "Nobbies" estates. Much of the land was sold to speculators rather than those interested in building on it, and by 1974 only 11 percent of the 986 blocks had been cleared or built on.

== Land buyback ==
Progressive residential development on the Summerland Estate was considered a threat to the survival of the penguin colony. The 1989 Phillip Island Penguin Reserve Management Plan called the estate "a major blight on the landscape". In the early 1970s, the local shire had started to buy back land on the estate.

In 1985, the Victorian government announced that it would purchase all 774 allotments on the Summerland Peninsula to protect the penguin colony, setting up the "Summerland Estate Buy-Back Programme". The programme had a projected end date of 2000, with the land to be added to the Phillip Island Nature Park. During this period, land owners could not build on their land, improve their properties, or sell them to anyone but the Government. By 2007, 732 properties had been voluntarily sold by their owners, at a cost to the government of around a million dollars a year.

The buyback process was finalised in 2007, with the compulsorily acquisition of the final 42 properties (20 empty blocks and 22 with houses, held by 34 private owners) to take place over the next three years, at a cost of $15 million. In 2008, five property purchases were settled and agreement to purchase one property was reached, along with six negotiated purchase offers and one offer for compulsory acquisition. In 2008-09, 14 properties were purchased, taking the total number to 25 and leaving 17 properties still to be acquired.

In June 2010, the government announced that the buy-back programme had been completed, and the land involved was in the process of being added to the Phillip Island Nature Park and revegetated. A few scattered houses remained on the subdivision.
