= South Dudley =

- Town
- Coordinates: 38°35′50″S 145°34′37″E
- Country: Australia
- State: Victoria
- LGA: Bass Coast Shire
- Established: 1910

Government
  - State electorate: Bass
  - Federal division: Monash

Population
  - Total: 461 (2016 census)
- Postcode: 3995

South Dudley is a small town located in Bass Coast Shire in Victoria, Australia.

== Early history ==
South Dudley was established in the early 1910s to house employees of the adjoining State Coal Mine. It was subdivided by a private syndicate of developers, who originally intended to establish a town three times larger than what was actually built. Freehold land first went to auction at Melbourne's Athenaeum Theatre on 6 April 1910, and a construction boom followed. Up until the mine's closure in 1968, South Dudley essentially functioned as a worker's village.
