= Coronet Bay =

- Town
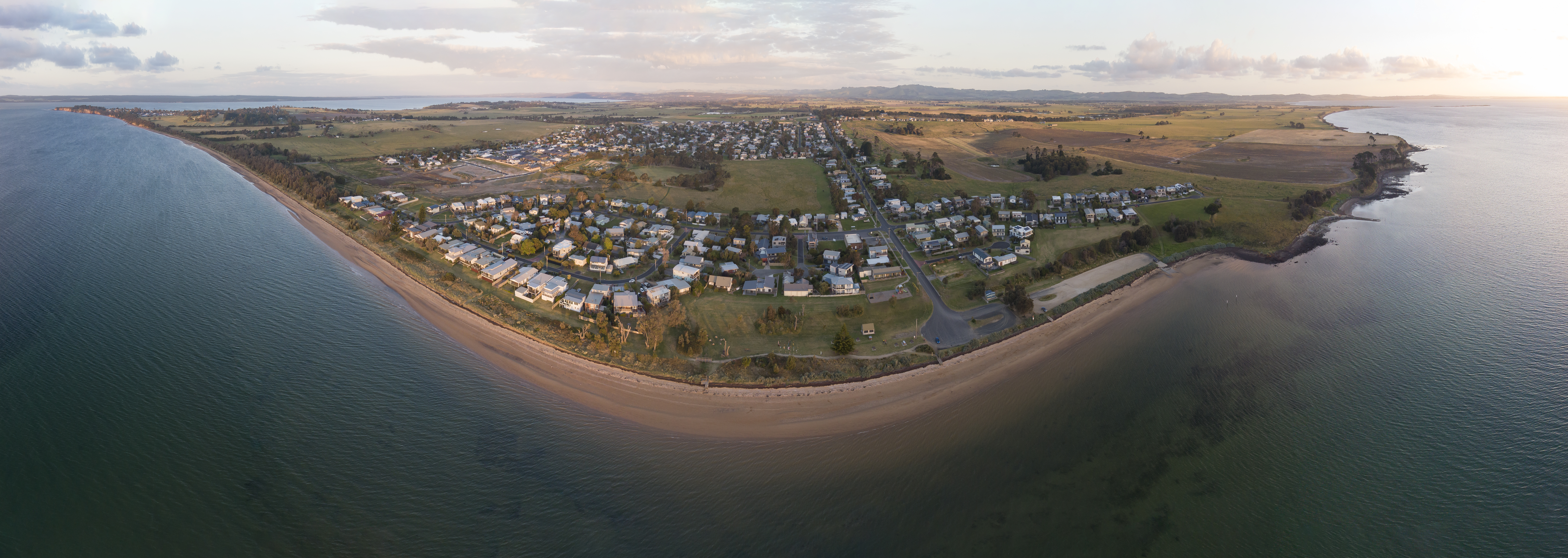
- Aerial panorama of Coronet Bay

- Coordinates: 38°26′S 145°27′E
- Country: Australia
- State: Victoria
- LGA: Bass Coast Shire

Government
  - State electorate: Bass
  - Federal division: Monash

Population
  - Total: 791 (2016 census)
- Postcode: 3984

Coronet Bay is a town in Victoria, Australia, located 114 km south-east of Melbourne via the M1 and the Bass Highway, on the eastern shore of Western Port Bay.

The town serves as a holiday destination with a focus on recreational fishing. A boat ramp is available in the neighboring town of Corinella.

Coronet Bay is serviced by a General Store.

== History ==
Just to the east of the present town, a settlement was founded in 1826 from Sydney, in response to a concern for possible French territorial claims. In that year Dumont d'Urville, in command of the corvette Astrolabe, examined Westernport, arousing suspicion during his scientific voyage. Authorities in Sydney had also recently received reports from explorers Hamilton Hume and William Hovell, who mistakenly believed they had reached Westernport in 1824, when in fact they had arrived at Corio Bay many kilometres to the west. A contingent of soldiers and 21 convicts under the command of Captain Wright was dispatched with William Hovell to assist. Initially, a small military settlement called Fort Dumaresq was established near the present-day site of Rhyll, on the north coast of Phillip Island. But lack of fresh water proved a problem and the outpost was moved to Corinella, at that time called Settlement Point.

Hovell's subsequent report claiming Westernport was unsuitable for agriculture, owing to poor soil and lack of fresh water, and also the absence of any Frenchmen, led to the abandonment of the settlements in 1828. The buildings were burnt to prevent use by escaped convicts. A memorial cairn in Jamieson Street Corinella marks the site of the original settlement, and another monument at the end of Smythe Street commemorates Paul Edmund de Strzelecki's exploration in 1840.

The 1826-8 Corinella was subject to extensive archaeological investigations in the late 1970s by the Victoria Archaeological Survey, led by Peter Coutts. Although equivocal in its conclusions about the location and remains of the settlement, the dig established the importance of the site to Victoria's history and European settlement.
