= The Gurdies =

- Town
- Coordinates: 38°22′15″S 145°33′50″E
- Country: Australia
- State: Victoria
- LGA: Bass Coast Shire

Government
  - State electorate: Bass
  - Federal division: Monash

Population
  - Total: 191 (2016 census)
- Postcode: 3984

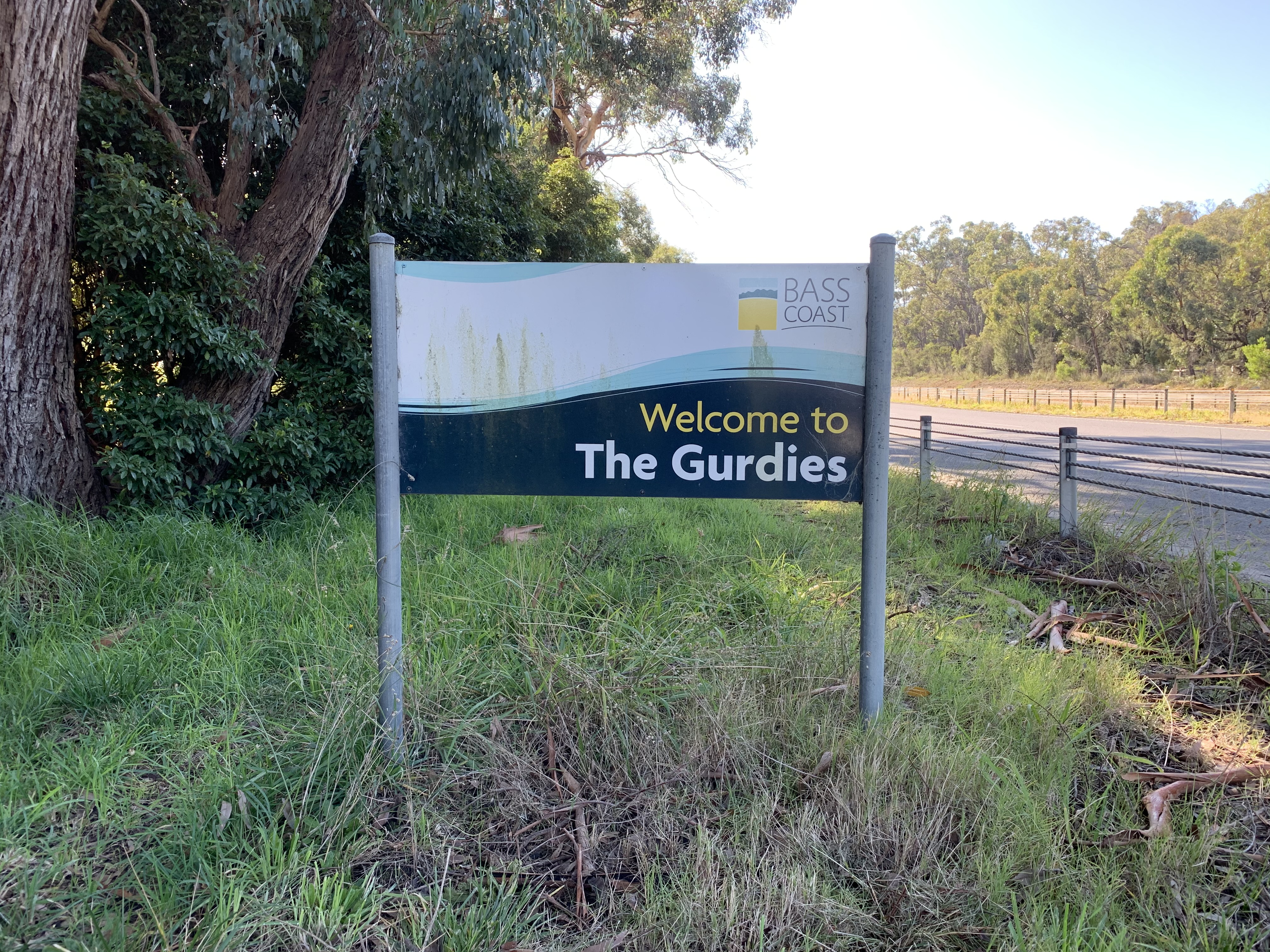
Welcome to The Gurdies

The Gurdies is a village located in Bass Coast Shire in Victoria, Australia.

== History ==
=== Name ===
The Gurdies takes its name from a pastoral run on the site known as The Hurdy Gurdy. 'Hirdie Girdie' is a Scottish term which refers to the wild and untamed land of the area.

=== Prehistoric Period ===
Important because much of "The Gurdies" lies in the Victorian Department of Primary Industries, Melbourne supply area Extractive areas of interest (2003) with many quarries operating in the area supplying Melbourne's Sharp sand.

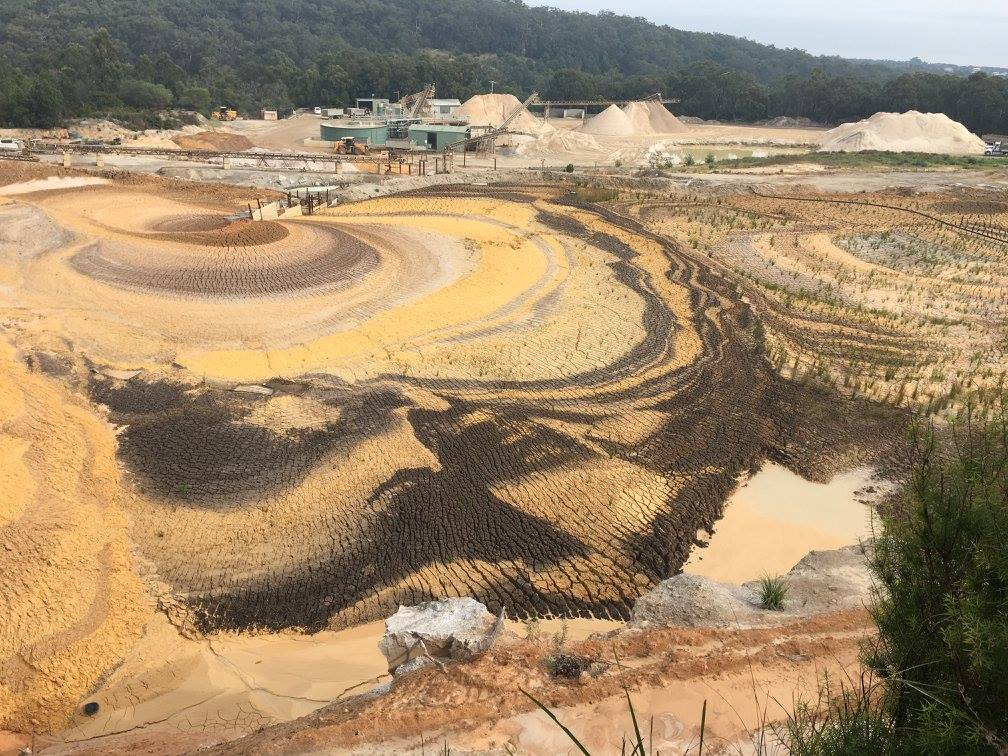
The Gurdies" Nature Conservation Reserve Quarry

In the late Jurassic and early Cretaceous periods (160 - 96 million years ago), Australia and Antarctica began to separate. As they moved apart, a large basin (or ‘rift valley’) was formed by subsidence. This basin was then slowly filled by up to 3,000 metres of sediments (sandstones and mudstones) which were deposited by rivers and lakes. Accumulated swamp material would later be compacted to form coal seams in the Wonthaggi area. During this period, the vegetation was dominated by conifers and ferns, and dinosaurs roamed the earth. From the middle Cretaceous period, Australia had moved further away from Antarctica. The stresses caused by this separation resulted in significant folding, faulting and uplifting of the earlier Cretaceous sediments. The uplift resulted in the development of the Otway and Strzelecki Ranges.

Victoria experienced a warm and wet tropical type climate throughout much of the Tertiary period and temperate rainforest was widespread over much of the state. During the Tertiary period, (from approximately 65 million years ago) Australia continued to drift away from Antarctica (at rates of up to 6 cm per year). Three interconnected marine basins (Otway, Gippsland and Bass) formed along the southern edge of Victoria's continental plate and significant marine sediments were laid down in shallow seas. Some parts of these basins now lie onshore but most are to be found beneath Bass Strait where commercial oil and gas reserves have been found within these sediments. During the Tertiary period, significant earth movements occurred along fault lines. Subsidence between fault lines resulted in the formation of the Port Phillip and Westernport sunklands. Port Phillip and Westernport Bays were formed within these sunklands as sea levels rose. The sea level fluctuated significantly during Tertiary times.

Following the uplift of the South-Eastern highlands in the late Tertiary period (approximately 5 million years ago), extensive river systems developed over dry land areas. These rivers formed deep channels which were filled with coarse gravels. Some of these have been preserved as river terraces along present day streams. As the uplands became eroded away, the rivers draining them became reduced in size. These slower flowing streams then deposited only finer grained sediments. These Tertiary sediments covered much of the Silurian sediments but have since been largely covered by more recent Quaternary deposits.

The eastern margin of the Koo-Wee-Rup Plain is marked by an abrupt rise trending northeast–southwest. This rise extends from west of Drouin towards the coast at Grantville and forms the western margin of the elevated block-faulted terrain of the South Gippsland Hills. The principal control of relief is the Heath Hill Fault which is of late Pliocene or early Pleistocene age.

=== Recorded History ===
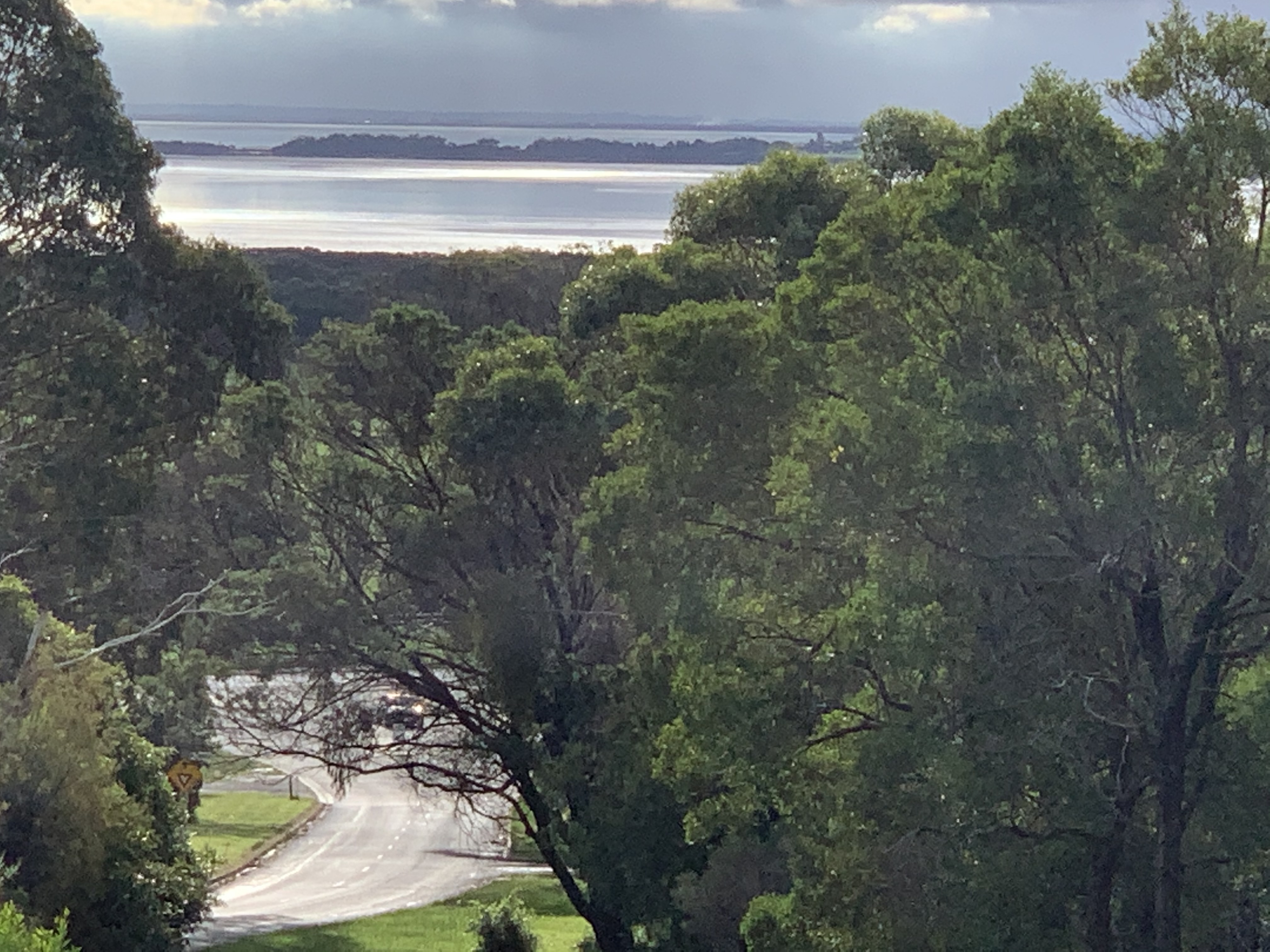
The Gurdies looking towards the Bass Highway turnoff

In mid-May 1840, explorer Paweł Edmund Strzelecki and his party emerged from the Gippsland wilderness into The Gurdies, marking the end of a harrowing 22-day survival struggle. The expedition navigated the Western Port Woodlands, transforming a fight for survival into a successful breakthrough toward the coast and rescue.

The first record of people staying in 'The Gurdies' was recorded on 22 April 1844. When the Chief Protector George Augustus Robinson (1791-1866) accompanied by the Protector of the Melbourne District Mr William Thomas (Australian settler) (1794–1867) and their government party, consisting of one dray, a fine team of eight bullocks, six native police, under Sergeant Wyndrige, with three white men camped at the Hurdy Gurdy Creek (native name Barbin Bullook).

With one native policeman with the sergeant, going before to direct the way, followed by two white men, one with a felling axe, and the other with a tomahawk to make a passage for the dray.

The path on which the native policeman, directed the group, most likely having been originally made by the Boon wurrung people, (and probably not far from where the Bass Coast Highway crosses the creek today), as the forest above formed an impenetrable jungle. "first note the growth of giant white gums and blue gum attaining to a height of 150 or 200 feet. Below this, reaching to a height of about 100 feet, was a dense growth of spar-like saplings. Below this again was a remarkably luxuriant growth of blackwoods one of the acacia species, ranging in height from 15 to 40 feet, and a dense growth of hazel, musk and dogwood scrub. As the sun could not penetrate, both the foot growth and the soil, even in the middle of summer were saturated and reeking with moisture".

On arriving at, a creek all dismounted and assisted in cutting down trees and dragging logs to make a crossing place, Mr. Thomas states that the Native police conducted themselves well, working hard at crossing places while two of the native police attend to the Chief Protector George Augustus Robinson.

The track made by the dray and the Government party was easy to follow, and Mr. Thomas came back by himself following the track the entire way, Mr. Thomas camped there again on 29 April 1844 with Mr Hobson's party, who were travelling 7 days behind the Government party.

In his role as Protector, Mr. Thomas had good intentions. He formed a close friendship with Billibellary and made efforts to learn the ways of the Wurundjeri, learning both Woi wurrung and Boon wurrung language. The Protectors wanted to keep Aboriginal people out of the town, in order to "civilize" them by settling them in villages and converting them Christianity and eventually enable them to be part of society. Mr. Thomas was later named Guardian of the Aborigines on 1 January 1850. His instructions were nearly identical to when he was appointed Assistant Protector, except Superintendent Charles La Trobe now emphasised that Thomas was ‘to keep the blacks out of Melbourne.

Just 8 years earlier, in 1836 news of increasing numbers of unauthorized settlers in the south and of their outrages against the Aboriginals had reached Sydney. Further attention was attracted in June 1835 the Port Phillip Association headed by Vandemonians (Tasmanians) — Batman a pastoralist, Swanston a banker, Gellibrand a lawyer, and Wedge a government surveyor — "illegally" planned to occupy land in Victoria with their sheep so that they could expand their pastoral experiences. Both the Vandemonians and the British Government tried to have learned lesson from the frontier war in Van Diemens Land to prevent conflict around Port Phillip, consequently the need for a Protector of Aborigines with the most common form of warfare practiced by the Aborigines in Port Phillip being raids on sheep. In order to achieve their aims, Batman had signed a treaty, or made an agreement, to purchase land from the local Aborigines. He hoped to be able to persuade the British government to hold the ‘treaty’ valid so that he and his partners could proceed with their pastoral activities. However, in October 1835: the Proclamation of Governor Bourke that Australia was terra nullius upon which British settlement was based, reinforcing the notion that the land belonged to no one prior to the British Crown taking possession of it, and that all people found occupying land without the authority of the government would be considered illegal trespassers, and that Aboriginal people therefore could not sell or assign the land, nor could an individual person acquire it, other than through distribution by the Crown. In September William Lonsdale was chosen by Governor Sir Richard Bourke to be the first police magistrate at Port Phillip.

Lonsdale, his wife, children and two servants sailed in H.M.S. Rattlesnake, which anchored near the mouth of the Yarra River on 29 September 1836. Three surveyors, two customs officials, a commissariat clerk, Ensign King with thirty privates of the 4th Regiment, and thirty convicts followed in October. They found 224 residents in a settlement several miles up the Yarra. Lonsdale decided to establish the government centre there, although Gellibrand Point (Williamstown) would have been more convenient for the unloading of stores. The inland site, however, had the advantage of a plentiful supply of fresh water, and was, he reported, suited to the performance of his civil duties.

By the end of 1838, according to Port Phillip's Crown Lands Commissioner, there were still 57 squatters in the Port Phillip District. The last major deployment of the British Army took place in 1838, when Major James Nunn, led the 80th Regiment to the Melbourne road in the Port Phillip District, after which the army left frontier fighting to settlers and civilian police, but warfare would continue for another 90 years, until the British had occupied the entire continent from Gippsland to the Kimberleys.

In 1840 The New South Wales Government declared an act to further restrain the unauthorised occupation of Crown Lands, and divides the Port Phillip District into the "Western Port District" and the "Portland Bay District" and in 1848 Melbourne became a city.

The Hurdy Gurdy Pastoral Run (or Crown Lease) rapidly reduced in acreage (size), as the land was subdivided and sold off by Crown Allotment, from John Thom's original application to lease the land as a pastoral run in 1838, until the small amount of Crown land remaining on the lease made it unviable as a "Pastoral Lease" and the lease was cancelled in 1883. The lessees of the Hurdy Gurdy Pastoral Run, over its lifespan, were as follows:

1838 John Thom

1841 Cuthbert and Gardiner, abandoned

Feb. 1851 Jas. Cuthbert, by tender

July 1858 And. Tobin

July 1861 John Simpson

Aug. 1865 John Scott

Jan. 1867 Edwin Brett

July 1867 Simeon Cohen

Jan. 1871 Mark Moss

June 1874 Fred Poole

Jan. 1876 John C and Thos. Barrett

Nov. 1883 cancelled

It was still being referred to as "The Wilderness" in 1918 by Mr G. E. Bonney, who had lived on Crown Allotments 98A & 98B since 1885, a part of this historic run, commonly known as "The Gurdies".

To understand "The Gurdies" and the "Hurdy Gurdy" Run it becomes necessary to view it in the terms of the Crown Surveyor, who defined the parcels of land as Crown Allotments. The majority of the land was sold off in 1852, Lots 91-100 and Lots 101-120 having previously been advertised in the Government Gazette A large amount of the land was purchased by Mr John Duerdin, who through various buying and selling, would build up the large "Duerdin Estate" in the Parish of Corinella, which would eventually be broken up 1911.

The same 'Parish Map' in 1948 reveals to the reader, that most of the title deeds located in "The Gurdies" had changed hands during the 1880s, with some local landmarks (like roads) still bearing these names today.

| Lot | Date | Surname | Initial |
|---|---|---|---|
| 94 | 8 July 1881 | Wilkie | J |
| 117 | 12 February 1883 | Howat | G. |
| 118 | 12 February 1883 | Howat | G. |
| 109 | 13 May 1884 | Vickers | E. |
| 99 | 2 February 1885 | Chambers | J |
| 100 | 2 February 1885 | Chambers | J |
| 120A | 13 July 1885 | Davies | R. |
| 101 | 17 August 1885 | Cole | W.H. |
| 127 | 5 December 1885 | McG Long | J |
| 128 | 5 December 1885 | McG Long | J |
| 93A | 16 April 1886 | Brell | B |
| 107 | 7 July 1886 | Stead | A.J. |
| 106 | 1 September 1886 | Nowell | F.A. |
| 122 | 21 January 1887 | Davies | R. |
| 93C | 11 February 1887 | Stark | H |
| 104 | 22 March 1887 | Chambers | J |
| 98 | 23 April 1887 | Stark | H |
| 131 | 20 April 1887 | McLughlin | D. |
| 132 | 17 May 18887 | Reid | J. |
| 93B | 6 August 1887 | LeRour | E |
| 130 | 17 August 1887 | McNeil | W. |
| 115 | 7 September 1887 | Wilkie | J. |
| 102 | 26 November 1887 | Valrent | P |
| 120 | 9 March 1888 | O'Rourke | R.S. |
| 125 | 1 March 1888 | Hall | S. |
| 113 | 22 May 1888 | Greer | J.A. |
| 97 | 28 July 1888 | Crook | F.H. |
| 110 | 9 October 1888 | Davies | R. |
| 134 | 2 October 1889 | Davies | R. |
| 103 | 7 February 1894 | Cole | W.H. |
| 105 | 29 February 1896 | Hall | J |
| 124 | 13 February 1896 | Hall | J. |
| 126 | 29 February 1896 | Hall | T |
| 116 | 1 April 1896 | Garry | J. |
| 108 | 10 January 1903 | Bergmeier | H.H. |
| 96 | 2 February 1907 | Williams | J. E. |
| 100A | 15 March 1911 | Chambers | J |
| 133 | 5 July 1911 | Lytlle | The Rev J.T. |
| 96A | 1 March 1912 | Kent | G |
| 112 | 15 December 1927 | Sims | C. |

It would not be until 4 December 1959, that Crown Allotment 102 (in the Parish Of Corinella, County Of Mornington Vol 4094, Fol 798) would be subdivided under LP 50943, and provide "The Gurdies" with its first residential zone, that being 'Island View Road', off Kent Road.

== Tourism ==
The Gurdies Nature Conservation Reserve

Hurdy Gurdy Creek Nature Conservation Reserve

== Utilities ==
Electricity: Electricity is provided by the distributor AusNet Services.

Gas: Gas is generally provided by ELGAS.

Telecommunications: Telephone and Internet services are distributed by the National Broadband Network using their 'Fixed Wireless' methodology.

Water & Sewage: Although The Gurdies is not connected to their reticulated systems yet, and uses Tank Water for drinking and Septic systems for sewage. Westernport Water does make a Parks charge, once a year on behalf of Parks Victoria as it is cheaper for the community than Parks Victoria issuing a separate bill.

== Transport ==
The Gurdies is approximately 2 hours from Melbourne by coach (Bus), a faster route may be possible using a combination of different forms of public transport using the Public Transport Victoria Journey Planner.
