= Glen Alvie =

- Town
- Coordinates: 38°29′48″S 145°38′41″E
- Country: Australia
- State: Victoria
- LGA: Bass Coast Shire

Government
  - State electorate: Bass
  - Federal division: Monash

Population
  - Total: 165 (2016 census)
- Postcode: 3979

Glen Alvie is a small town located in Bass Coast Shire in Victoria, Australia.
