= Queensferry, Victoria =

Queensferry Victoria
- Coordinates: 38°25′5″S 145°30′2″E
- Postcode(s): 3984
- LGA(s): Bass Coast Shire
- State electorate(s): Bass
- Federal division(s): Monash

Queensferry is a locality located in Bass Coast Shire in Victoria, Australia.

== History ==
In the 19th century, Queensferry was an important port town connecting Western Gippsland to Melbourne and the other side of Westernport Bay, used for passenger transport and freight, especially timber from the Bass Hills. At this point, Queensferry contained hotels, three public halls, a general store and a licensed Colonial Wine Saloon, as well as houses. The town went into decline when the Wonthaggi railway line opened in 1910, as the line could be used instead of ships to transport timber. Six residents stayed in the town, but were driven out in the late 1920s by a flood caused by an abnormally high tide. Houses were flooded and the land was saturated with salt water, causing it to become useless for several years.
