= Harmers Haven =

- Town
- Coordinates: 38°39′12″S 145°34′50″E
- Country: Australia
- State: Victoria
- LGA: Bass Coast Shire

Government
  - State electorate: Bass
  - Federal division: Monash

Population
  - Total: 37 (2016 census)
- Postcode: 3995

Harmers Haven is a small town located in Bass Coast Shire in Victoria, Australia.
