= Pioneer Bay, Victoria =

Pioneer Bay Victoria
- Coordinates: 38°22′53″S 145°33′3″E
- Population: 352 (2016 census)
- Postcode(s): 3984
- LGA(s): Bass Coast Shire
- State electorate(s): Bass
- Federal division(s): Monash

Pioneer Bay is a small town located in Bass Coast Shire in Victoria, Australia.
