= Jam Jerrup =

- Town
- Coordinates: 38°19′27″S 145°31′1″E
- Country: Australia
- State: Victoria
- LGA: Bass Coast Shire

Government
  - State electorate: Bass
  - Federal division: Monash

Population
  - Total: 97 (2016 census)
- Postcode: 3984

Jam Jerrup is a town in Bass Coast Shire, Victoria, Australia. In the 2016 census, Jam Jerrup had a population of 97.
