= Bass Coast Shire =

Coordinates: 38°32′00″S 145°32′00″E

- Local government area
- Location in Victoria

- Interactive map of Bass Coast Shire
- Country: Australia
- State: Victoria
- Region: Gippsland
- Established: 1994
- Council seat: Wonthaggi

Government
  - Mayor: Cr Brett Tessari
  - State electorate: Bass
  - Federal division: Monash

Area
  - Total: 866 km^{2} (334 sq mi)

Population
  - Total: 35,327 (2018)
  - Density: 40.793/km^{2} (105.65/sq mi)
- Gazetted: 2 December 1994
- Website: Bass Coast Shire
LGAs around Bass Coast Shire
Casey	Cardinia	Baw Baw
Mornington Peninsula	Bass Coast Shire	South Gippsland
Bass Strait	Bass Strait	Bass Strait

The Bass Coast Shire is a local government area in Victoria, Australia, located in the southeastern part of the state. It covers an area of 866 square kilometres (334 mi^{2}) and in June 2018 had a population of 35,327. It includes the towns of Bass, Cape Paterson, Cape Woolamai, Corinella, Coronet Bay, Cowes, Inverloch, Kilcunda, Lang Lang, Newhaven, Rhyll, San Remo, Summerlands and Wonthaggi as well as the historic locality of Krowera. It also includes the popular tourist destination Phillip Island.

The Shire is governed and administered by the Bass Coast Shire Council; its seat of local government and administrative centre is the council headquarters in Wonthaggi, with other service centres located in Cowes, Grantville and Inverloch. The Shire is named after its most precious asset, the coasts of Bass Strait and Western Port.

== History ==
The Bass Coast Shire was formed in 1994 from the amalgamation of the Shire of Bass, Shire of Phillip Island and Borough of Wonthaggi, as well as parts of the Shire of Woorayl, Shire of Korumburra and City of Cranbourne.

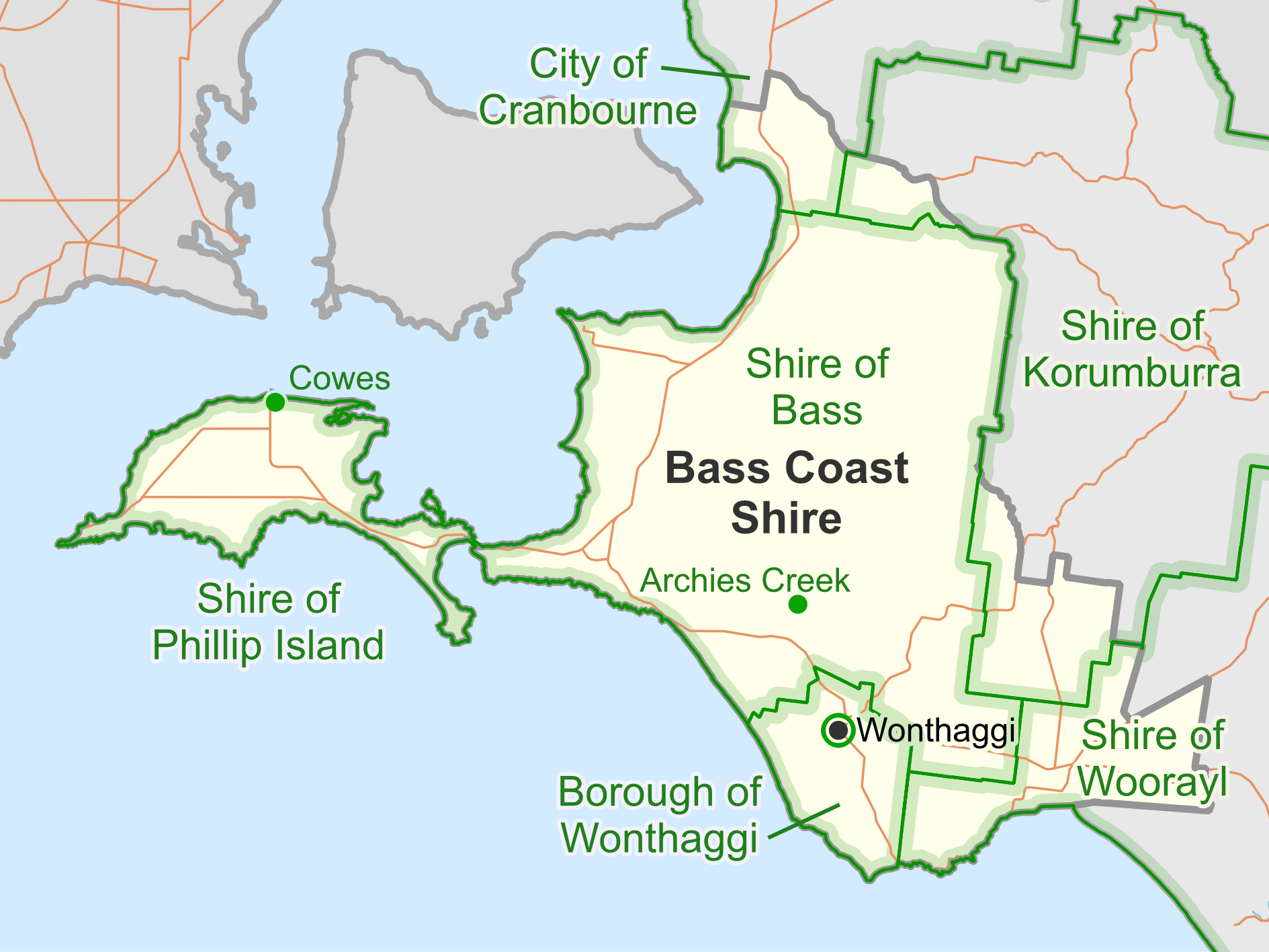
Bass Coast Shire's predecessor LGAs (green) as they were in 1994. The administrative centres of the former LGAs are marked by green dots.

== Council ==
=== Current composition ===
2024 ward boundaries. Expand the map and click on a ward to see the ward name.

The council is composed of three wards and nine councillors, with three councillors elected to represent each ward.

Ward	Party	Councillor	Notes
Bunurong	Independent	Les Larke	
Bunurong	Independent National	Brett Tessari	
Bunurong	Independent Labor	Leticia Laing	
Island	Independent	Ron Bauer	President of the Reason Party in Victoria from 2017 until 2018.
Island	Independent	David Rooks	
Island	Independent	Michael Whelan	
Westernport	Independent	Clare Le Serve	Current Mayor (2023/24)
Westernport	Independent Labor	Geoff Ellis	
Westernport	Independent	Rochelle Halstead	Deputy Mayor (2023/24)

=== 2020 election results ===
2020 Victorian local elections: Bass Coast
Party	Votes	%	Swing	Seats	Change
Independent	16,082	47.68		6	
Independent National	6,372	18.89		1	
Independent Liberal	4,645	13.77		1	
Independent Labor	4,284	12.70		1	
Greens	1,639	4.86		0	
Liberal	708	2.10		0	
Formal votes	33,730	96.91			
Informal votes	1,077	3.09			
Total	34,807	100.0		9	
Registered voters / turnout	42,627	81.65			

=== Administration and governance ===
The council meets in the council chambers at the council headquarters in the Wonthaggi Municipal Offices, which is also the location of the council's administrative activities. It also provides customer services at both its administrative centre in Wonthaggi, and its service centre in Cowes.

== Townships and localities ==
At the 2021 census, the shire had a population of 40,789, as compared to 32,804 in the 2016 census.

Population
Locality	2016	2021
Adams Estate	59	83
Almurta	48	66
Anderson	28	26
Archies Creek	22	32
Bass	359	405
Cape Paterson	891	1,111
Cape Woolamai	1,676	2,301
Churchill Island	0	0
Corinella	791	1,181
Coronet Bay	791	1,108
Cowes	4,839	6,593
Dalyston	583	843
Glen Alvie	165	182
Glen Forbes	106	118
Grantville	831	1,168
Harmers Haven	37	62
Inverloch^	5,437	6,526
Jam Jerrup	97	106
Kernot	100	118
Kilcunda	396	578
Kongwak^	197	207
Krowera^	108	134
Lance Creek	136	143
Lang Lang^	1,585	2,556
Loch^	638	707
Newhaven	449	547
North Wonthaggi	2,806	3,475
Outtrim^	235	270
Pioneer Bay	352	365
Pound Creek^	104	126
Queensferry	*	#
Rhyll	568	836
Ryanston	271	324
San Remo	1,254	1,700
Silverleaves	211	322
Smiths Beach	226	315
South Dudley	461	421
St Clair	49	44
Summerlands	0	0
Sunderland Bay	234	306
Sunset Strip	427	503
Surf Beach	533	670
Tenby Point	184	206
The Gurdies	191	243
Ventnor	855	982
Wattle Bank	177	250
West Creek	109	113
Wimbledon Heights	373	421
Wonthaggi	4,965	5,215
Woodleigh	125	126
Woolamai	208	245

^ - Territory divided with another LGA
* - Not noted in 2016 Census
# - Not noted in 2021 Census

== Facilities ==
- Local markets

=== Cape Paterson ===
- Swimming Rockpool – Safety Beach, Browns Bay, Surf Beach Road
- Bunurong Marine Park

=== Wonthaggi ===
- Lower Powlett Road – Williamsons Beach, Powlett River, Wonthaggi Wind Farm and Victorian Desalination Plant (tours and walking/cycling/horse riding)
- Bass Coast Rail Trail – walk/cycle/horse trot
- Historic mine whistle – sounds 12 noon every day in the centre of Wonthaggi, mine shaft tower, Apex Park, Murray Street
- Wonthaggi Museum – open Saturday mornings, Murray Street
- State Coal Mine – museum and tours, Garden Street
- Coal mine ruins – Number 5 Brace & the McBride tunnel entry, off West Area Road Wonthaggi and scattered around the region
- Wonthaggi Golf Course – 18 hole, par 72, ACR 70, easy walk, McKenzie Street
- Large chain stores
- Wonthaggi Hospital – Smoking ban, Graham Street

=== Phillip Island ===
- Phillip Island Penguin Parade
- Australian motorcycle Grand Prix
- Nobbies Centre at Seal Rocks

=== Krowera ===
- Garlic Farm, Olive Farm, Wayside Lookout, Dairy Farms

=== Kilcunda ===
- Kilcunda Trestle Bridge

=== Inverloch ===
- Inverloch Shell Museum and Dinosaur Exhibition

== Protected areas ==
Collecting empty seashells, driftwood, twigs, sea glass and other non-living materials or interesting rubbish of small size and in small quantities is legal from most beaches along the Bass Coast, with the exception of Wilsons Promontory, the Bunurong Marine National Park and most of Phillip Island.

On Phillip Island most beaches are off-limits for shell collecting and are run by Phillip Island Nature Parks, with the exceptions of Ventnor, Cowes, Rhyll and Newhaven.

The Bunurong Marine National Park is a middle outstretching section of Bunurong Marine Park along the coastline of Harmers Haven, Cape Paterson and Inverloch. The restricted zone (Bunurong Marine National Park inside Bunurong Marine Park) is an area south-west past Cape Paterson's Safety Beach and Undertow Bay; namely The Oaks, Twin Reefs, Shack Bay and Eagles Nest.

== See also ==
- List of places on the Victorian Heritage Register in Bass Coast Shire
- Mornington Peninsula and Western Port Biosphere Reserve
