= Krowera =

- Town
- Coordinates: 38°26′13″S 145°40′29″E
- Country: Australia
- State: Victoria
- LGA: Bass Coast Shire

Government
  - State electorate: Bass
  - Federal division: Monash

Population
  - Total: 108 (2016 census)
- Postcode: 3945

Krowera is a small town located in Bass Coast Shire in Victoria, Australia.
