= Woodleigh, Victoria =

Woodleigh Victoria
- Coordinates: 38°24′3″S 145°38′42″E
- Population: 125 (2016 census)
- Postcode(s): 3945
- LGA(s): Bass Coast Shire
- State electorate(s): Bass
- Federal division(s): Monash

Woodleigh is a locality located in Bass Coast Shire in Victoria, Australia.
