= List of places on the Victorian Heritage Register in Bass Coast Shire =

This is a list of places on the Victorian Heritage Register in the Bass Coast Shire in Victoria, Australia. The Victorian Heritage Register is maintained by the Heritage Council of Victoria.

The Victorian Heritage Register, as of 2021, lists the following seven state-registered places within the Bass Coast Shire:

| Place name | Place # | Location | Suburb or Town | Co-ordinates | Built | State registered | Photo |
|---|---|---|---|---|---|---|---|
| Churchill Island | H1614 | | Westernport Bay | 38.501806°S 145.339500°E | 1860s | 20 August 1982 | |
| Wollamai House | H0666 | 7 Cleeland Rd | Cape Woolamai | 38.521972°S 145.343861°E | 1876 | 16 September 1987 | |
| Wonthaggi Court House | H0974 | 75 Watt St | Wonthaggi | 38.607778°S 145.590250°E | 1856 | 5 August 1993 | |
| Wonthaggi railway station | H1557 | 8-12 Murray St | Wonthaggi | 38.604000°S 145.591056°E | 1912 | 20 August 1982 | |
| Wonthaggi State Coal Mine Eastern Precinct | H0198 | State Coal Mine Access Rd | Wonthaggi | 38.622833°S 145.595139°E | 1919 | 14 December 2006 | |
| Wonthaggi State Coal Mine Central Precinct | H1778 | Graham St | Wonthaggi | 38.604194°S 145.574750°E | 1909 | 25 February 1999 | |
| Wonthaggi State Coal Mine Northern Precinct (19 and 20 Shafts) | H1777 | Bass Hwy | Dalyston | 38.575667°S 145.570694°E | 1909 | 18 February 1999 | |
