= Silverleaves =

- Town
- Coordinates: 38°27′11″S 145°15′53″E
- Country: Australia
- State: Victoria
- LGA: Bass Coast Shire
- Location: 149 km (93 mi) SE of Melbourne; 50 km (31 mi) W of Wonthaggi; 3 km (1.9 mi) W of Cowes

Government
  - State electorate: Bass
  - Federal division: Monash

Population
  - Total: 211 (2016 census)
- Postcode: 3922

Silverleaves is a small town on Phillip Island, situated east of Cowes. At the 2016 census, Silverleaves had a population of 211. The name “Silverleaves” is believed to derive from the silvery-grey leaves of the coast banksia trees abundant in the dunes and foreshore in the area.

In 1950, the area, then basically scrubby, unfarmed sand dunes east of Cowes, was subdivided into housing allotments for holiday homes . About 250 lots were created between 1955 and 1962 as part of the Silverleaves Estate. The subdivision was marketed to families from Melbourne and elsewhere as a peaceful seaside holiday retreat. Unlike some neighbouring townships, Silverleaves was not a farming village or fishing port, and grew specifically as a holiday hamlet. Many buyers built simple fibro cottages or beach shacks among the banksias and tea-trees. In the late 1950s and 1960s, Silverleaves had a reputation as a tranquil hideaway “off the beaten track”, compared to busier Cowes.
