= St Clair, Victoria =

St Clair Victoria
- Coordinates: 38°34′41″S 145°36′25″E
- Population: 49 (2016 census)
- Postcode(s): 3995
- LGA(s): Bass Coast Shire
- State electorate(s): Bass
- Federal division(s): Monash

St Clair is a small town located in the Bass Coast Shire in Victoria, Australia.
