= Adams Estate =

- Town
- Coordinates: 38°25′28″S 145°31′55″E
- Country: Australia
- State: Victoria
- LGA: Bass Coast Shire

Government
  - State electorate: Bass
  - Federal division: Monash

Population
  - Total: 83 (2021 census)
- Postcode: 3984

Adams Estate is a small town located in Bass Coast Shire in Victoria, Australia.

== Demographics ==
As of the 2021 Australian census, 83 people resided in Adams Estate, up from 59 in the 2016 census. The median age of persons in Irrewarra was 41 years. There were more males than females, with 50.6% of the population male and 49.4% female. The average household size was 2.8 people per household.
