= Pound Creek =

- Town
- Coordinates: 38°37′39″S 145°49′2″E
- Country: Australia
- State: Victoria
- LGA: Bass Coast Shire

Government
  - State electorate: Bass
  - Federal division: Monash

Population
  - Total: 104 (2016 census)
- Postcode: 3996

Pound Creek is a small town located in Bass Coast Shire in Victoria, Australia. It is 8 kilometres from Inverloch and 22 kilometres from Leongatha. The town is named after the creek of the same name, which runs into Anderson's Inlet. Its basin commences north-east of Millars Road and south of Holgates Road in Leongatha South.

The town centre is generally considered to be along the Inverloch - Venus Bay road (route number C442), where the Country Fire Authority base and tennis courts are located, although anywhere adjacent to the water body of the same name is technically considered to be the centre of town.

An automatic weather station for the Australian Bureau of Meteorology is located at Pound Creek.
