= Wimbledon Heights =

- Town
- Coordinates: 38°29′S 145°14′E
- Country: Australia
- State: Victoria
- LGA: Bass Coast Shire
- Location: 138 km (86 mi) SE of Melbourne; 39 km (24 mi) E of Wonthaggi; 4 km (2.5 mi) S of Cowes
- Established: 9 September 1960

Government
  - State electorate: Bass
  - Federal division: Monash

Population
  - Total: 421 (2006 census)
- Postcode: 3922

Wimbledon Heights is a small town in the centre of Phillip Island, Victoria, Australia. It was established in 1960 as the Wimbledon Heights Estate, a residential subdivision comprising 362 lots. The estate was developed by interests associated with tennis player and Wimbledon champion Frank Sedgman. Its streets are named after famous tennis champions. The subdivision was designed by Francis O'Halloran. At the 2006 census, Wimbledon Heights had a population of 421.
