= Lance Creek, Victoria =

Lance Creek
- Town
- Coordinates: 38°33′15″S 145°38′24″E
- Country: Australia
- State: Victoria
- LGA: Bass Coast Shire

Government
  - State electorate: Bass
  - Federal division: Monash

Population
  - Total: 136 (2016 census)
- Postcode: 3995

Lance Creek is a small town located in Bass Coast Shire in Victoria, Australia. According to the 2021 census, the town had a population of 143 people. The males accounted for 52.4% of the population while females accounted for 47.6%. The median age was 52.
