= Sunset Strip (disambiguation) =

The Sunset Strip is the name given to the mile-and-a-half (2.4 km) stretch of Sunset Boulevard that passes through West Hollywood, California.

Sunset Strip also may refer to:

== Places ==
=== Australia ===
- Sunset Strip, New South Wales
- Sunset Strip, Victoria

== Film ==
- Sunset Strip (2000 film), an American comedy-drama film directed by Adam Collis
- Sunset Strip (2012 film), a documentary by Hans Fjellestad

== Music ==
=== Bands ===
- Sunset Strippers, a band

=== Songs and music pieces ===
- "Sunset Strip" (song), a song by Roger Waters
- "Sunset Strip", a song on the BatBox album by Miss Kittin
- Sunset Strip (composition), an orchestral composition by Michael Daugherty

== See also ==
- 77 Sunset Strip, television series
