= Ventnor, Victoria =

Ventnor Victoria
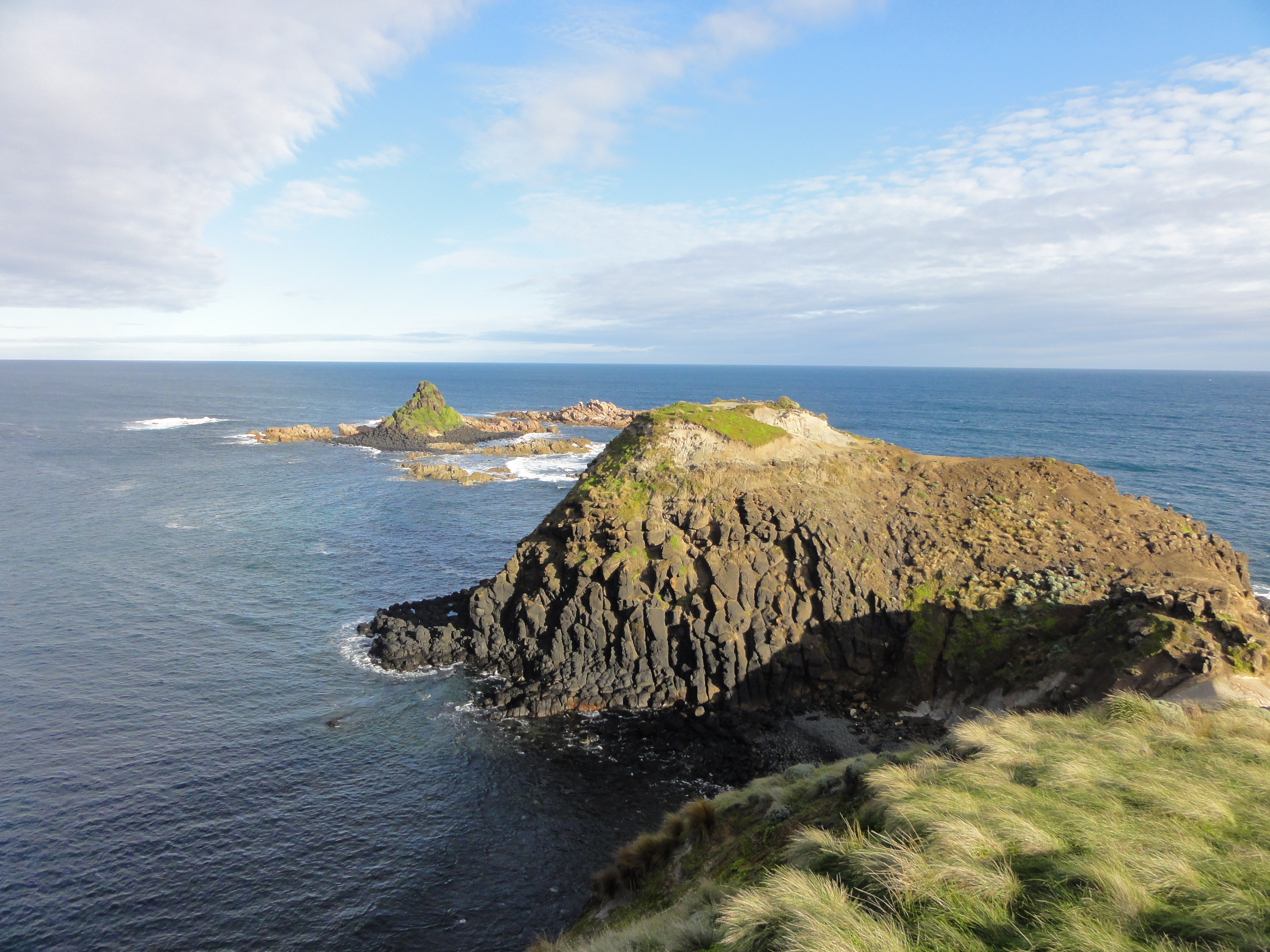
- Pyramid Rock lookout in Ventnor

- Coordinates: 38°27′46″S 145°11′46″E
- Population: 982 (2021 census)
  - Density: 25.57/km^{2} (66.23/sq mi)
- Postcode(s): 3922
- Elevation: 28 m (92 ft)
- Area: 38.4 km^{2} (14.8 sq mi)
- Location: 149 km (93 mi) S of Melbourne CBD
- LGA(s): Bass Coast Shire
- County: Mornington
- State electorate(s): Bass
- Federal division(s): Monash

Ventnor is a small town on Phillip Island in Victoria, Australia. It is the location of the Phillip Island Grand Prix Circuit. It was named after the town of Ventnor on the Isle of Wight. Quite a number of the roads in Ventnor, Phillip Island are named after other towns and villages on the Isle of Wight.

Ventnor has traditionally functioned as a residential and farming district on the island. Ventnor is also home to Grossard Point - named after Captain William Phillip Grossard, a merchant sea captain who was accidentally shot and killed in 1868, and is buried here.

== Demographics ==
As of the 2021 Australian census, 982 people resided in Ventnor, up from 855 in the 2016 census. The median age of persons in Ventnor was 58 years. There were fewer males than females, with 49.6% of the population male and 50.4% female. The average household size was 2.2 people per household.
