= Bill Rogers (footballer) =

Australian rules footballer (1893–1918)

Personal information
- Full name: William Martin Rogers
- Nickname: "Willie"
- Born: 15 April 1893; Woolamai, Victoria
- Died: 22 September 1918 (aged 25); Rouen, France
- Original team: Wonthaggi / Carlton District
- Height: 173 cm (5 ft 8 in)
- Weight: 68 kg (150 lb)
- Position: Follower

Playing career^{1}
Years	Club	Games (Goals)
1913	Carlton	3 (0)
- ^{1} Playing statistics correct to the end of 1913.

William Martin "Willie" Rogers (15 April 1893 – 22 September 1918) was an Australian rules footballer who played with Carlton in the Victorian Football League. He spent the 1913 season at Carlton before moving to the Victorian Football Association (VFA) side Brunswick in 1914.

He died of wounds sustained in action in World War I.

== Family ==
The son of John Rogers (-1909), and Mary Rogers (1856–1924), née Fitzgerald, William Martin Rogers was born at Woolamai, Victoria on 15 April 1893.

== Football ==
=== Carlton (VFL) ===
In addition to the three senior games he played with the Carlton First XVIII, he also played a number of games for "Carlton District" in the Metropolitan Junior Football Association (MJFA) in 1913.

=== Brunswick (VFA) ===
Rogers was granted a clearance from Carlton to Brunswick on 22 April 1914. However, there's no evidence that he ever played in a match for either the Brunswick First XVIII or its associated "Junior" team.

== Military service ==
He enlisted in the First AIF on 26 February 1916, and served overseas with the 3rd Machine Gun Battalion.

He was wounded in action, in France, on 12 October 1917.

He returned to active duty in France in June 1918, and was wounded in action, for a second time, on 18 September 1918.

== Death ==
Unconscious on admission, and failing to regain consciousness, he died of the gunshot wounds he had sustained in active service on 22 September 1918.

== See also ==
- List of Victorian Football League players who died on active service
