= Woolamai =

Woolamai Victoria
- Coordinates: 38°30′18″S 145°29′59″E
- Population: 245 (2021 census)
- Postcode(s): 3995
- LGA(s): Bass Coast Shire
- State electorate(s): Bass
- Federal division(s): Monash

Woolamai is a locality located in Bass Coast Shire in Victoria, Australia.
