= Corinella =

- Town
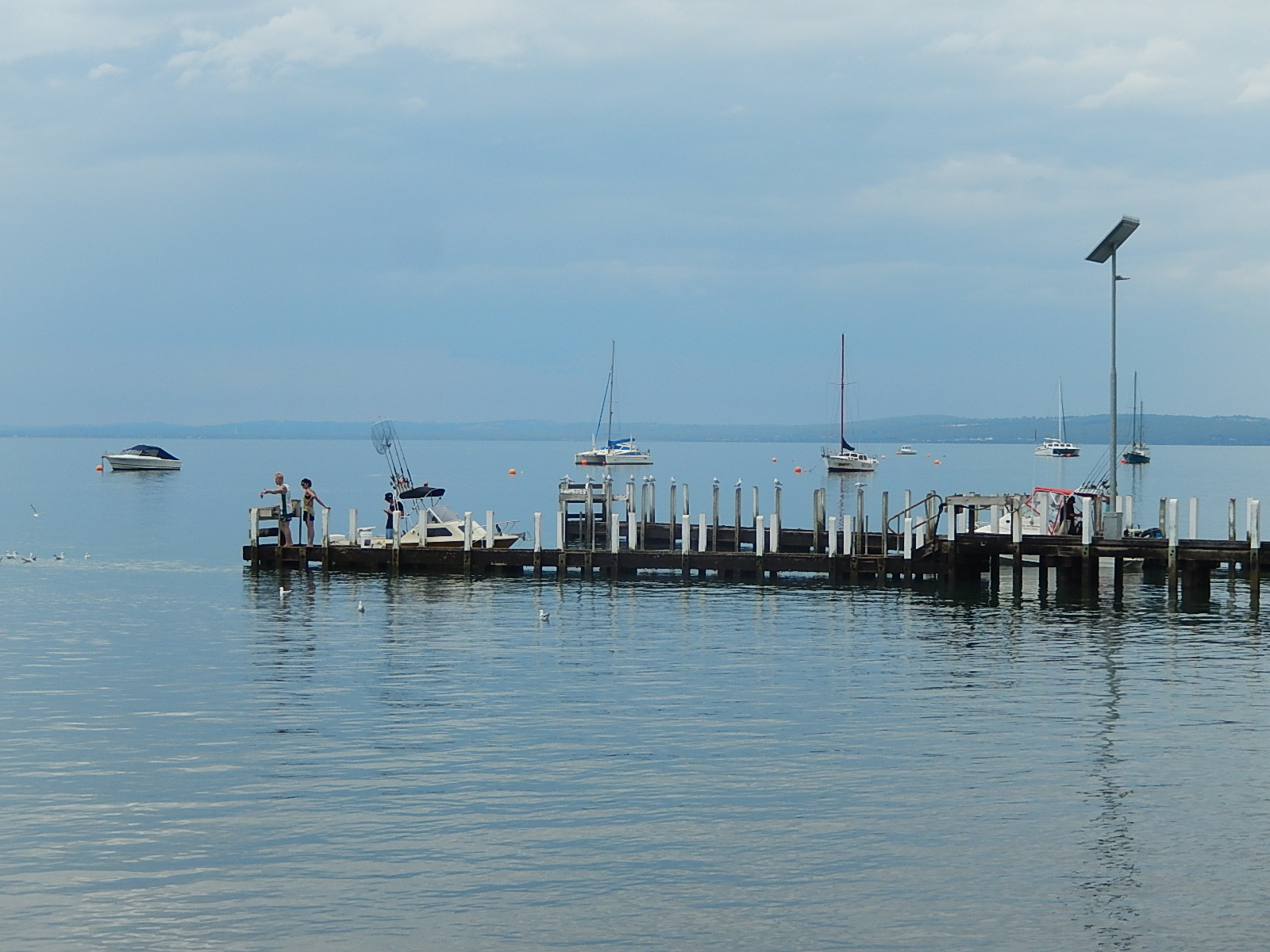
- Jetty at Corinella

- Coordinates: 38°24′12″S 145°25′20″E
- Country: Australia
- State: Victoria
- LGA: Bass Coast Shire
- Location: 124 km (77 mi) SE of Melbourne; 25 km (16 mi) NW of Wonthaggi; 19 km (12 mi) NE of Cowes

Government
  - State electorate: Bass
  - Federal division: Monash

Population
  - Total: 1,181 (2021 census)
- Postcode: 3984

Corinella is a town in Victoria, Australia, located 114 km south-east of Melbourne via the M1 and the Bass Highway, on the eastern shore of Western Port.

The town serves as a holiday destination, with a focus on recreational fishing, and has a pier and boat ramp. Limited vehicular access is also provided to French Island from Corinella, via a privately operated barge.

== History ==
Just to the east of the present town, a settlement was founded in 1826 from Sydney in response to a concern for possible French territorial claims. In that year Dumont d'Urville in command of the corvette Astrolabe examined Western Port during his scientific voyage, arousing some suspicion. Authorities in Sydney had also recently received reports from explorers Hamilton Hume and William Hovell, who mistakenly believed they had reached Western Port in 1824, when in fact they had arrived at Corio Bay many kilometres to the west. A contingent of soldiers and 21 convicts under the command of Captain Wright, accompanied by Hovell, was dispatched to forestall any French incursion. A small military settlement called Fort Dumaresq was established near the present-day site of Rhyll on the north coast of Phillip Island. Lack of fresh water proved a problem and the outpost was moved to Corinella, then called Settlement Point.

Hovell's subsequent report claiming Western Port was unsuitable for agriculture, owing to poor soil and lack of fresh water, and the absence of any French, led to the abandonment of the settlements in 1828. The buildings were burnt to prevent use by escaped convicts. A memorial cairn in Jamieson Street marks the site of the original settlement, and another monument at the end of Smythe Street commemorates Paul Edmund de Strzelecki's exploration in 1840.

The 1826-8 Corinella was subject to extensive archaeological investigations in the late 1970s by the Victoria Archaeological Survey led by Peter Coutts. Although equivocal in its conclusions about the location and remains of the settlement, the dig established the importance of the site to Victoria's history of European settlement.

In 1851, the township of Corinella, at "Corinella, Settlement Point, Western Port Bay", was officially proclaimed.

Recently the town has benefited from a number of improvements including extensive footpaths designed to enhance the safety of walkers through Smythe Street and the Esplanade. The pier has undergone important maintenance works, and the cycling and walking track that starts in Smythe Street, runs down Guy Road and ends at the Primary School is complete.
