= West Creek =

West Creek may refer to the following locations:

== Australia ==
- West Creek, Victoria

== United States ==
- West Creek (New Jersey), a stream
- West Creek (Pennsylvania), a stream
- West Creek, New Jersey, a community
- West Creek Township, Lake County, Indiana
- West Creek High School, Clarksville, Tennessee
- West Creek Natural Area, a protected area of Rocky Mountain National Park in Larimer County, Colorado
