= West Creek, Victoria =

West Creek Victoria
- Coordinates: 38°31′1″S 145°36′30″E
- Population: 109 (2016 census)
- Postcode(s): 3992
- LGA(s): Bass Coast Shire
- State electorate(s): Bass
- Federal division(s): Monash

West Creek is a locality located in Bass Coast Shire in Victoria, Australia.
