= Cape Woolamai =

- Suburb
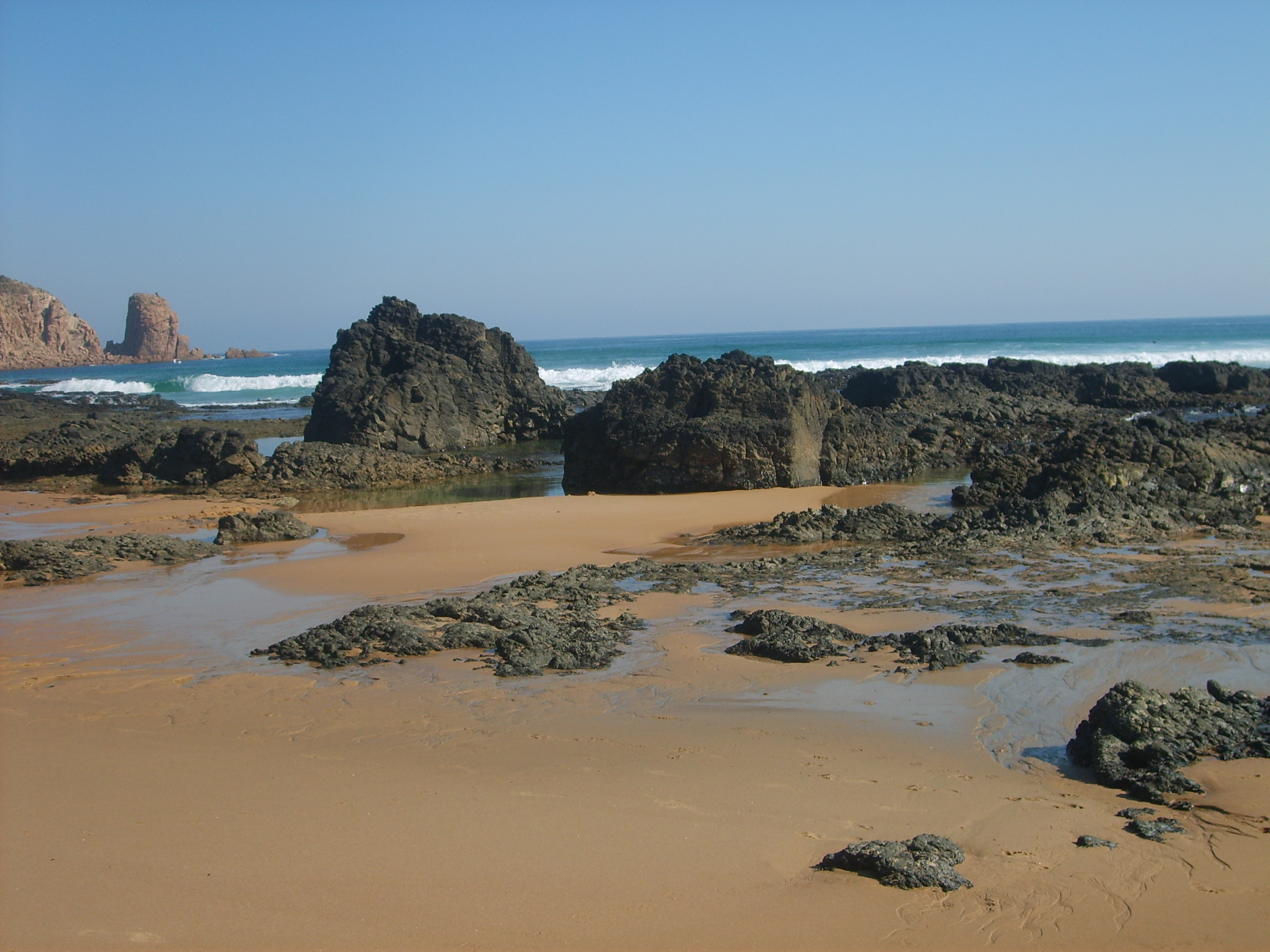
- The rocks and rockpools at Cape Woolamai Surf Beach

- Coordinates: 38°31′40″S 145°20′13″E
- Country: Australia
- State: Victoria
- LGA: Bass Coast Shire
- Location: 140 km (87 mi) from Melbourne
- Established: 15 March 1961

Government
  - State electorate: Bass
  - Federal division: Monash

Population
  - Total: 2,301 (2021 census)
- Postcode: 3925
Suburbs around Cape Woolamai
Surf Beach	Newhaven	Newhaven
Bass Strait	Cape Woolamai	Western Port
Bass Strait	Bass Strait	Western Port

Cape Woolamai is a town and headland at the south eastern tip of Phillip Island in Victoria, Australia. It is home to Cape Woolamai State Faunal Reserve and the Phillip Island Airport. Cape Woolamai contains a residential subdivision also called Cape Woolamai (formerly known as Woolamai Waters and Woolamai Waters West). Cape Woolami beach is one of four beaches that forms part of the National Surfing Reserve on the island, along with Smiths Beach, Summerland and Cat Bay.

== History ==
The cape was named by George Bass (but spelt "Wollamai") when he passed it on his whaleboat voyage in early 1798. Wollamai is the snapper fish (Pagrus auratus) in the language of the Eora Aboriginal people of Port Jackson, where the fish is found. Bass, who had learnt some of the Sydney language from the Eora leader Bennelong, thought the headland resembled the head of that fish. In 1826, during the establishment of Fort Dumaresq, near Rhyll, coal was reported to have been found in the vicinity of the Cape.

The area was purchased from the government in 1868 by John Cleeland, sea captain, publican and owner of the Melbourne Cup winner of 1875. He then built Wollomai House and ran merino sheep from New South Wales. In 1910 his son, John Blake Cleeland, noticed the sand was shifting due to erosion, so he planted rows of Marram grass, still evident today.

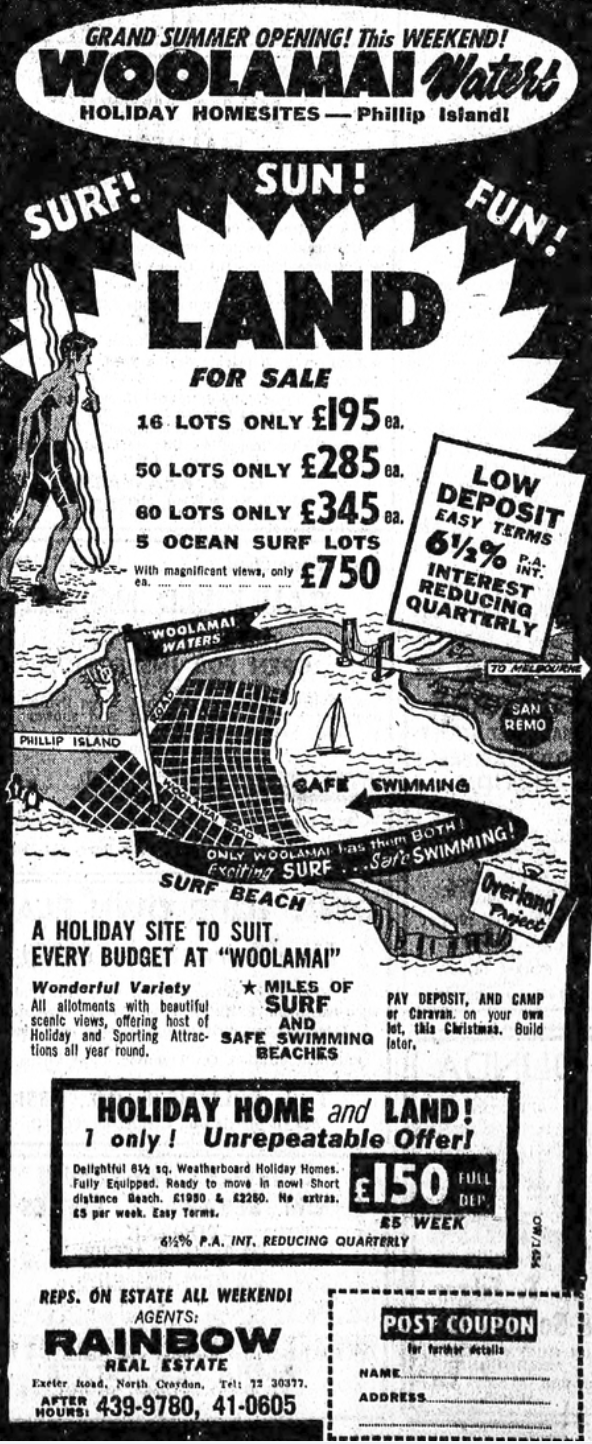
1964 advertisement

In 1959, entrepreneur Isidor Magid proposed to develop a major private housing estate at Cape Woolamai for holidaying Melbourne families. His firm, the Overland Development Corporation, had acquired over 90 hectares of farmland for the project and applied to have it subdivided into over a thousand residential lots. Plans designed by engineer R. A. Beveridge were approved in 1961.

Progress was put on hold after the Bolte Liberal government began talks to acquire part of the land for a conservation reserve. At the time, Cape Woolamai was home to an estimated 20,000 protected Short-tailed shearwater birds. In 1962, over 120 hectares was transferred to the Government for conservation purposes.

The development launched in late 1963 and was marketed as the Woolamai Waters estate. Lots could be purchased empty or packaged with weatherboard beach shacks. The developers partnered with Commodore Hotel to propose a licensed hotel-motel for the estate, however, plans were ultimately never approved.

The town was later renamed Cape Woolamai. The Woolamai Post Office was open from 1911 until 1974. The roads were sealed in the late 1980s and beach shacks gradually turned into more substantial houses. Today Cape Woolamai has a world-renowned surf beach, Woolamai Beach Surf Life Saving Club, and a popular safety beach.

== Environment ==
The headland contains remnant vegetation and wildlife such as an important breeding colony of the short-tailed shearwater, also called the Australian muttonbird. Volunteer groups such as the Cape Woolamai Coast Action Group conduct regular improvement and maintenance works including weed control and revegetation. It lies within the Phillip Island Important Bird Area, identified as such by BirdLife International because of its importance in supporting significant populations of little penguins, short-tailed shearwaters and Pacific gulls.

== Gallery ==
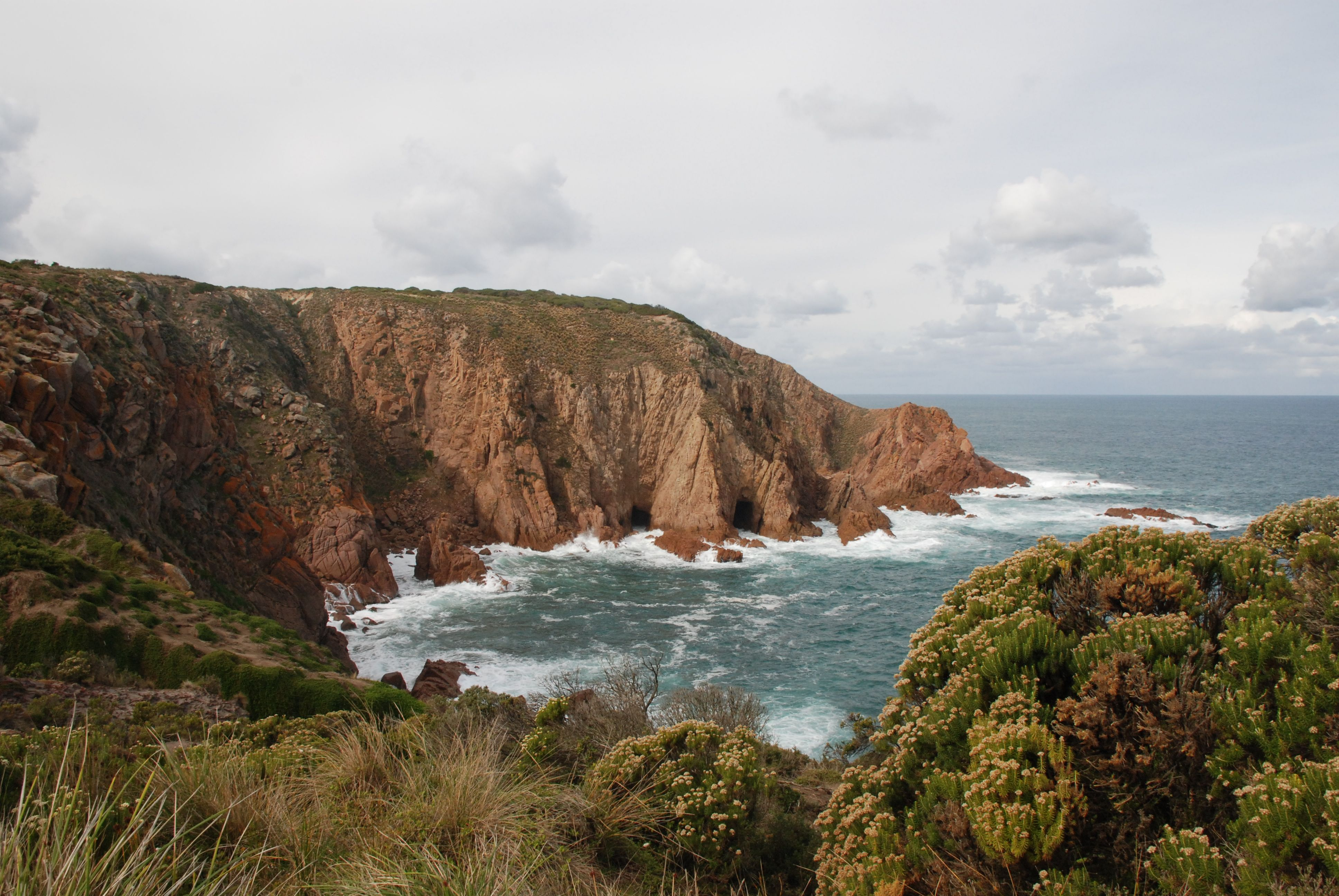
View from the cape looking south

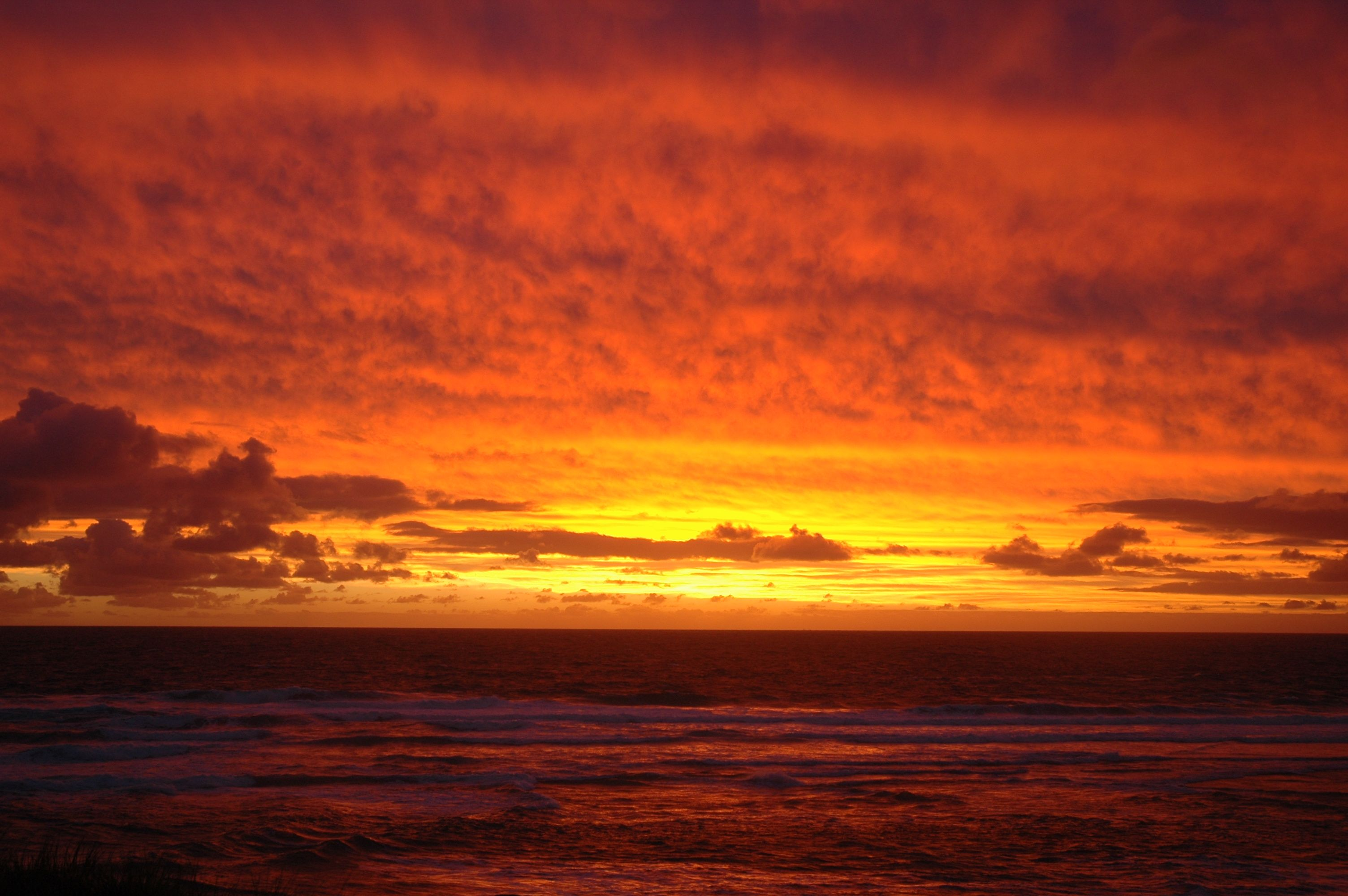
Cape Woolamai Surf Beach

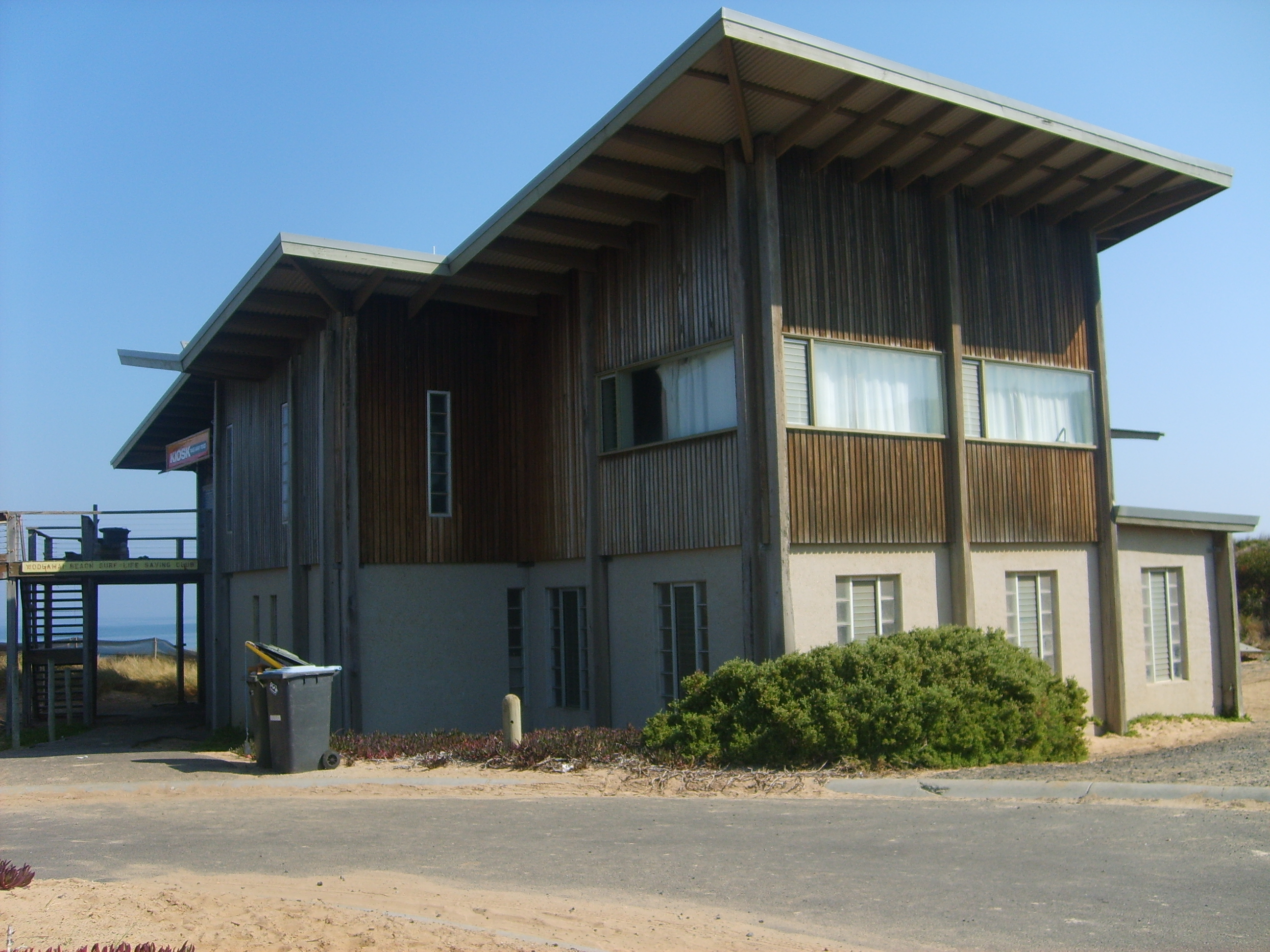
The surf club at Cape Woolamai

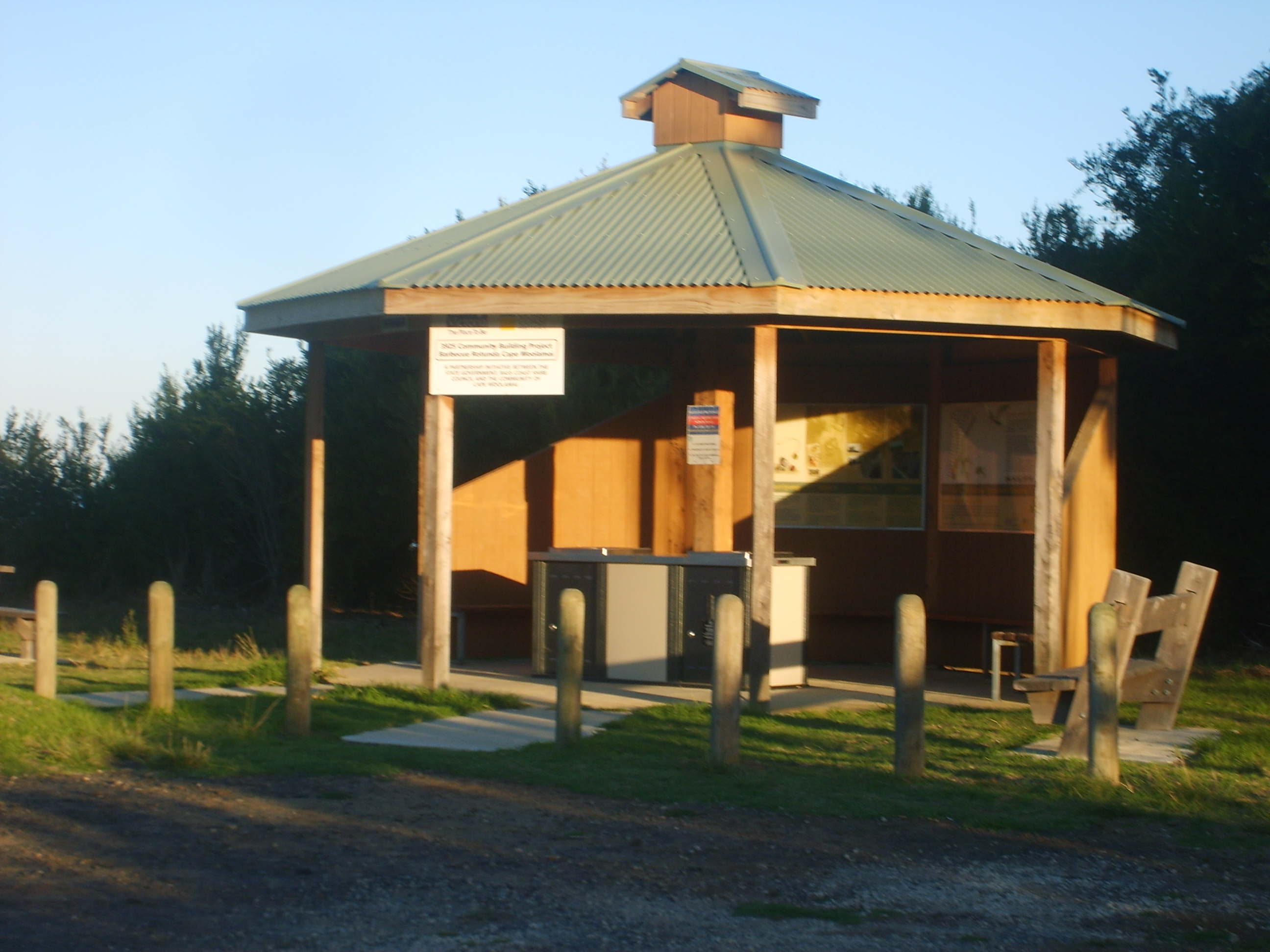
The gazebo on The Esplanade

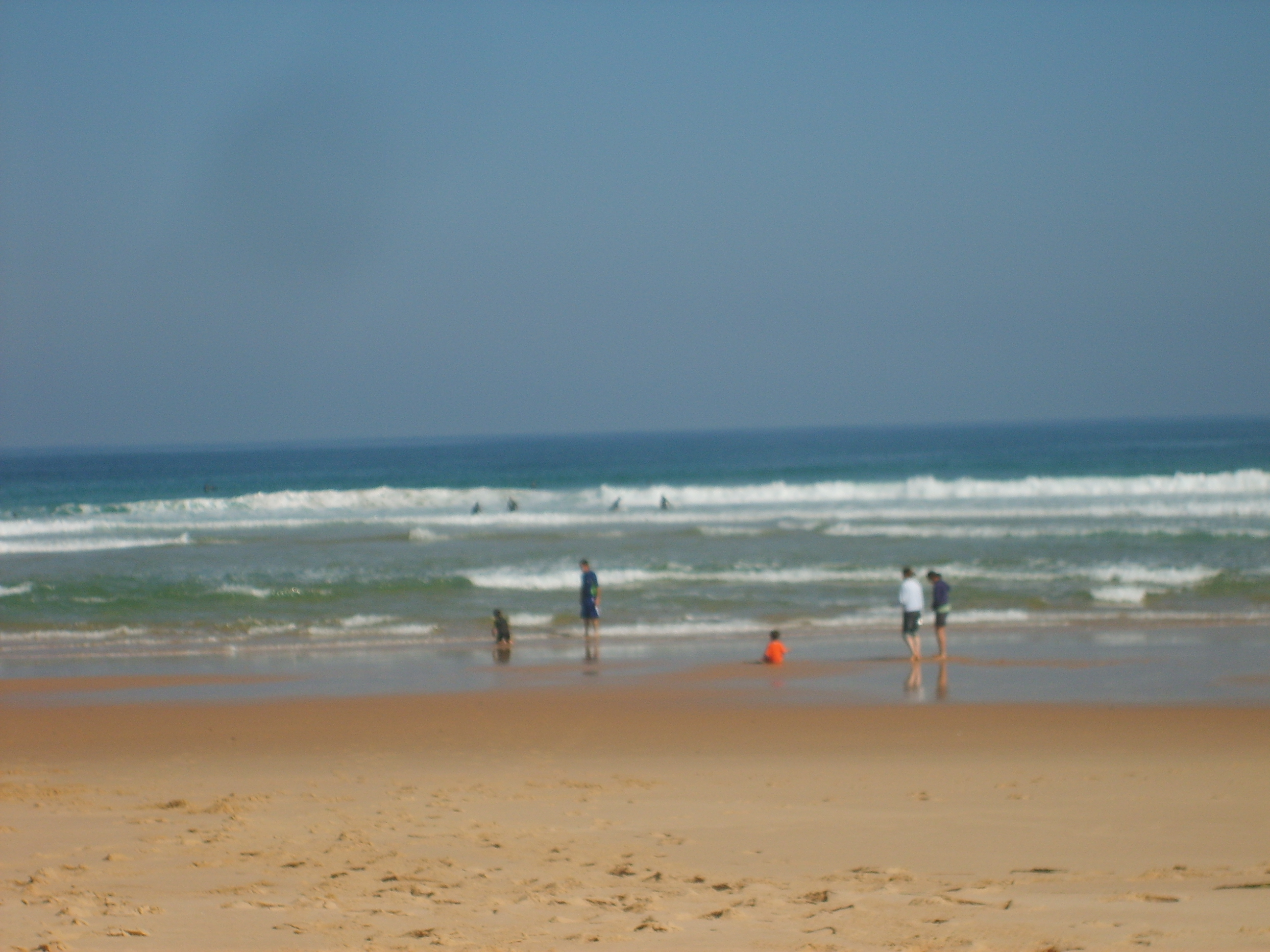
Cape Woolamai Surf Beach
