= Sunset Strip, Victoria =

Australian town

Sunset Strip
- Town
- Coordinates: 38°29′42″S 145°15′58″E
- Country: Australia
- State: Victoria
- LGA: Bass Coast Shire

Government
  - State electorate: Bass
  - Federal division: Monash

Population
  - Total: 427 (2016 census)
- Postcode: 3922

Sunset Strip is a small town on Phillip Island in Victoria, Australia. It was established during the early 1960s and named after West Hollywood’s Sunset Strip. Construction accelerated in the 1980s, eventually transforming Sunset Strip into an established community.

== History ==
In the 1950s, Melbourne entrepreneur Kevin Mulhall, together with a private group of investors, acquired a large paddock wedged between Back Beach Road and Phillip Island Road. The group engaged prominent civil engineer and surveyor Ronald George Lee to prepare plans for a new residential community of approximately 350 homes. The estate would become known as Sunset Strip.

The proposal emerged during a boom of post-war development speculation on Phillip Island, fuelled by rapid population growth and the increasing popularity of the island as a holiday destination. During this period, new holiday settlements were established at Wimbledon Heights, Cape Woolamai and Smiths Beach. Mulhall was connected to the developers of these towns through his auctioneering company, Victorian Realty Service, which specialised in promoting and selling large-scale subdivisions.

The name Sunset Strip was borrowed from the famous stretch of Sunset Boulevard in West Hollywood, California. The name had become familiar to Melbourne audiences through the American private-detective television series 77 Sunset Strip, which aired regularly on Channel 9 between 1959 and 1964. In 1961, a marketing campaign was launched for the new estate, with blocks promoted through newspaper advertisements.

Early purchasers entered into contracts conditional upon subdivision approval being secured within several months. The approval process was delayed, however, forcing the cancellation of most of the original contracts and significantly slowing the estate's development. Land sales eventually resumed in 1963 and continued through to 1968.

The original subdivision plan set aside open space along Phillip Island Road and proposed a row of shops at the northern end of Panorama Avenue. The shops were never constructed. Development of the estate remained slow for more than a decade, with only around 20 holiday homes built by 1975. The pace of construction picked up during Phillip Island's population boom in the 1980s, transforming what had begun as a speculative holiday subdivision into an established residential settlement. Today, the original Sunset Strip estate is effectively fully developed.

In 2006, developer Metcalfe & Reidy received approval to subdivide 26 blocks immediately east of Sunset Strip, creating the residential area around Saltwater Place. On the opposite, northern side of the town, another developer has progressively subdivided land into low-density residential allotments since 2004, extending the settlement beyond the boundaries of the original estate.
