= Smiths Beach =

Smiths Beach may refer to these places in Australia:

- Smiths Beach, Victoria
- Smiths Beach, Western Australia
