= William Eastwood Thompson =

Australian philanthropist

William Eastwood Thompson (c. 1868 - November 1952) was an Australian settler of Phillip Island, Victoria, and a philanthropist. Born around 1868 in Brighton, Victoria, to James Thompson and his wife Ruth, he grew up in Melbourne and first visited Phillip Island as a youth in 1889. The middle name “Eastwood” came from his mother’s family, and he would later use it as part of his identity. Thompson married a woman named Lucy, and together they would become deeply involved in community life. His business background and financial security enabled him to support local initiatives.

== Settlement on Phillip Island and community involvement ==
Thompson permanently settled with his family in Cowes (the main town of Phillip Island) in 1912. Over subsequent decades, he and his wife were involved in a range of local civic and community activities. Thompson also served as president of the Phillip Island Progress Association, where he advocated for improvements to the town.

One of his most visible projects was the planting of a long avenue of Golden Cypress trees along the main street of Cowes. Beginning in 1912, the trees were planted in stages with assistance from local residents and schoolchildren. By 1935, both sides of the street were lined with cypress trees, and the road later became known as Thompson Avenue. An earlier proposal for a landscaped central median was altered, but the tree plantings proceeded along the roadside instead.

William Thompson also championed many other greening projects on the island. He was responsible for planting Norfolk Island pines on Warley Avenue and adding palms and pines to the Cowes foreshore in the 1920s. He also partnered with other locals (such as Percy Hutchinson) to plant street trees like those along Steele Street. Thompson even saw to it that a shelter belt of pines was planted around three sides of the Cowes Recreation Reserve (football ground) for wind protection, and he pushed for proper drainage of the sports ground.

== Warley Hospital and philanthropy ==
In the early 1920s, Phillip Island had no resident doctor or hospital. Urgent cases had to be ferried to the mainland, a difficult journey. Determined to improve this, the Thompsons stepped forward in 1923. They agreed to purchase a large house in Cowes known as “Buena Vista” (formerly owned by the Walpole family) and donate it for use as the island’s first hospital. Their offer came with the condition that local residents raise funds to furnish and equip the facility. The community enthusiastically obliged, and the house was fittingly renamed Warley, after Mr. Thompson’s family home in England, once it became a hospital.

Warley Bush Nursing Hospital officially opened on 8 December 1923 with six patient beds and a modern operating theatre. It was Victoria’s first Bush Nursing Hospital, a model private community hospital affiliated with the Victorian Bush Nursing Association. Warley Hospital saved countless lives and spared locals the hardship of long trips to Melbourne; it remained the island’s medical centre for 85 years (serving from 1923 until its closure in 2008).

== Later years and legacy ==
In July 1937, the people of Phillip Island showed their gratitude to the Thompson family in a special way. At a public ceremony attended by dignitaries and hosted by the Shire Council, the main street of Cowes was officially named Thompson Avenue in their honour. After nearly four decades on Phillip Island, William and Lucy Thompson bade farewell to the island community in 1950. A large civic reception was held at the Erehwon Guest House where representatives of every local organisation gathered to thank them. Descendants of the Thompson family still live on the island, preserving the family’s local ties.

William Eastwood Thompson died in November 1952 at the age of 85. His life dates are often given as circa 1870–1955 in local records, but contemporary reports indicate he died in late 1952. Thompson Avenue remains a central thoroughfare in Cowes, and the founding of Warley Hospital is recorded as a significant development in Phillip Island’s local history. Several public spaces and infrastructure projects on the island are associated with Thompson’s initiatives, reflecting his long-term involvement in civic and community affairs.
