= Rhyll =

- Town
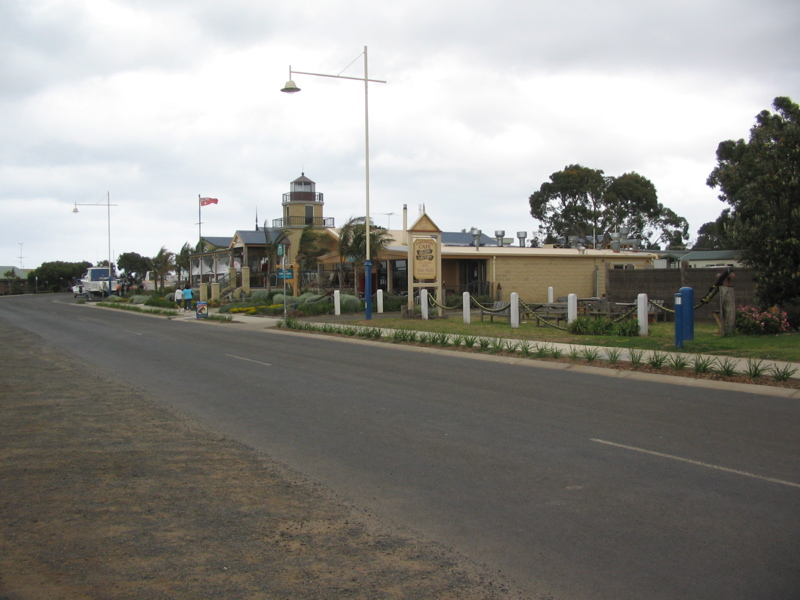
- Beach Road, Rhyll

- Coordinates: 38°27′47″S 145°18′14″E
- Country: Australia
- State: Victoria
- LGA: Bass Coast Shire
- Location: 140 km (87 mi) from Melbourne
- Established: 1880s

Government
  - State electorate: Bass
  - Federal division: Monash

Population
  - Total: 836 (2021 census)
- Postcode: 3923
Localities around Rhyll
Silverleaves
Cowes	Rhyll
Wimbledon Heights

Rhyll is a small fishing town on Phillip Island in Victoria, Australia. It is located in the north-east corner of the island. It is named after Rhyl, a holiday resort in Denbighshire, Wales. At the 2021 census, Rhyll had a population of 836.

The first European to arrive in the area was George Bass, who landed in 1798 to make repairs to his ship. He returned in the same year with Matthew Flinders and a memorial for this landing is maintained close to Rhyll pier. A temporary British settlement called Flagstaff was established in 1826, and was settled in 1856.

The post office opened on 19 September 1889. It operates as a central mail collection point for locals as there is no mail delivery. It is also a general store.

There is a boat service centre, and a three-lane boat ramp which is accessible 24 hours.

The mangrove boardwalk of the Rhyll Inlet is a haven for pelicans, black swans, gulls and straw-necked ibis. The all-tide boat ramp is equipped with barbecues, two playgrounds, tennis courts and public toilets. Rhyll contains a general store, and accommodation includes several bed and breakfasts, and a full range of dining is available, from a local tavern and restaurant, to breakfast dining and restaurants with take-away menus, including a fish and chip shop.

== Climate ==
Rhyll has an oceanic climate heavily moderated by the surrounding sea, resulting in mild summers with frequent dry spells, and moderately wet and cool winters that remain within 11 °C (20 °F) from summer highs on average.

Climate data for Rhyll (1991–2020 normals, extremes since 1990)
Month	Jan	Feb	Mar	Apr	May	Jun	Jul	Aug	Sep	Oct	Nov	Dec	Year
Record high °C (°F)	40.2 (104.4)	42.1 (107.8)	37.9 (100.2)	31.1 (88.0)	23.6 (74.5)	20.9 (69.6)	19.3 (66.7)	25.7 (78.3)	25.2 (77.4)	30.9 (87.6)	35.5 (95.9)	38.2 (100.8)	42.1 (107.8)
Mean daily maximum °C (°F)	24.0 (75.2)	24.4 (75.9)	22.6 (72.7)	19.6 (67.3)	16.3 (61.3)	14.0 (57.2)	13.4 (56.1)	14.3 (57.7)	16.1 (61.0)	18.1 (64.6)	20.2 (68.4)	22.0 (71.6)	18.7 (65.8)
Daily mean °C (°F)	19.9 (67.8)	20.2 (68.4)	18.2 (64.8)	15.7 (60.3)	13.6 (56.5)	11.5 (52.7)	10.6 (51.1)	11.4 (52.5)	12.8 (55.0)	14.4 (57.9)	16.3 (61.3)	17.9 (64.2)	15.2 (59.4)
Mean daily minimum °C (°F)	15.6 (60.1)	16.0 (60.8)	14.7 (58.5)	12.7 (54.9)	10.8 (51.4)	8.9 (48.0)	8.2 (46.8)	8.4 (47.1)	9.5 (49.1)	10.6 (51.1)	12.4 (54.3)	13.8 (56.8)	11.8 (53.2)
Record low °C (°F)	1.3 (34.3)	0.7 (33.3)	−1.8 (28.8)	0.3 (32.5)	−0.7 (30.7)	1.2 (34.2)	−1.1 (30.0)	0.4 (32.7)	1.7 (35.1)	0.3 (32.5)	−0.6 (30.9)	0.7 (33.3)	−1.8 (28.8)
Average precipitation mm (inches)	37.6 (1.48)	40.4 (1.59)	39.6 (1.56)	60.2 (2.37)	75.6 (2.98)	64.0 (2.52)	68.9 (2.71)	80.3 (3.16)	68.5 (2.70)	59.3 (2.33)	58.9 (2.32)	45.4 (1.79)	698.7 (27.51)
Average precipitation days (≥ 1 mm)	5.2	4.6	6.2	8.3	10.9	9.9	12.3	13.1	11.6	9.4	7.9	6.5	105.9
Average afternoon relative humidity (%)	61	60	60	64	70	74	73	68	66	64	64	61	65
Source: Bureau of Meteorology
