= Smiths Beach, Victoria =

Smiths Beach
- Town
- Coordinates: 38.5°S 145.235°E
- Country: Australia
- State: Victoria
- LGA: Bass Coast Shire
- First People: Bunurong people
- Established: 1960

Government
  - State electorate: Bass
  - Federal division: Monash

Population
  - Total: 226 (2016 census)
- Postcode: 3922

Smiths Beach is a small town on Phillip Island in Victoria, Australia. It is located on Back Beach Road, on the shores of Smiths Beach. The main beach is a one-kilometre stretch of south-west facing shoreline, renowned for its consistent surf. The beach is one of four beaches that forms part of the National Surfing Reserve on Phillip Island along with Cape Woolamai, Summerland and Cat Bay.

At low tide, visitors can explore rock pools at either end of the beach It is also home to a short-tailed shearwater (Australian muttonbird) colony. A second, more secluded beach—YCW Beach, is accessible from Beachcomber Avenue and is also a popular spot for surf lessons. Fishing enthusiasts can take advantage of the rocky platforms at both beaches. Smiths Beach has a small commercial centre at the junction of Smiths Beach Road and Marlin Street.

== History ==
The locality of Smiths Beach and the beach from which it takes its name are named after H. Smith, who acquired the majority of the land on which the present-day locality is situated in 1874. The land was later developed for dairy farming before being acquired for residential subdivision during the 1950s.

The town of Smiths Beach was created by the Smiths Beach Estate, which was announced in 1960 by entrepreneurs Hans Bachrach and Max Naumburger. They envisaged a holiday town of 430 blocks and a small group of shops. Shortly after its announcement, the owners of land on the opposite (west) side of Smiths Beach Road began advertising a rival project known as the Beachcomber Estate, with 360 blocks.

Prospective buyers of land on both estates had entered contracts with the developers that were conditional on the plans being approved within a few months. However, this ended up taking over two years, by which point most contracts had been cancelled. Full approval for the Surf Beach Estate was eventually granted in 1963, followed by part of the Beachcomber Estate in 1965. A second section of the latter was approved in 1966.
