= Cowes, Victoria =

Cowes
- Town
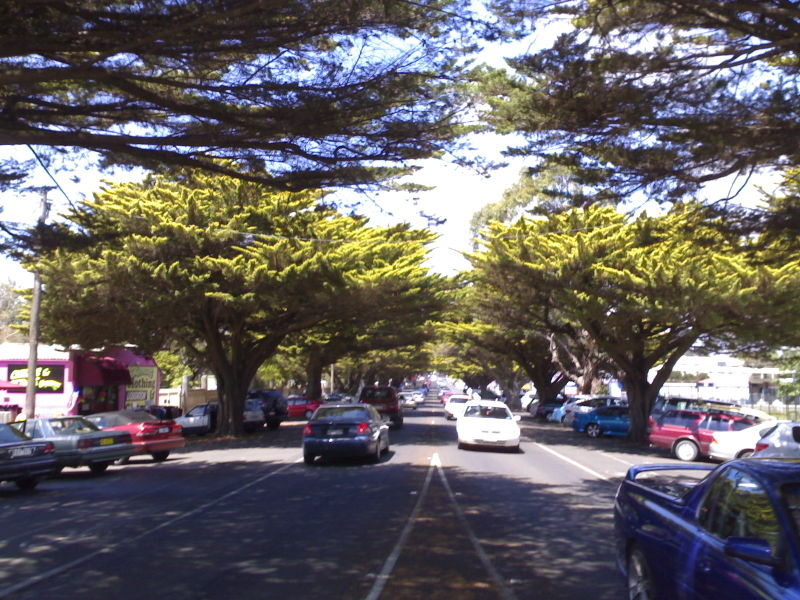
- Golden Cypress trees on Thompson Avenue

- Coordinates: 38°27′04″S 145°14′31″E
- Country: Australia
- State: Victoria
- LGA: Bass Coast Shire
- Location: 141 km (88 mi) S of Melbourne CBD
- Established: 1869

Government
  - State electorate: Bass
  - Federal division: Monash

Area
  - Total: 20.7 km^{2} (8.0 sq mi)
- Elevation: 12 m (39 ft)

Population
  - Total: 6,593 (2021 census)
  - Density: 318.5/km^{2} (824.9/sq mi)
- Postcode: 3922
- County: Mornington
- Mean max temp: 18.8 °C (65.8 °F)
- Mean min temp: 10.3 °C (50.5 °F)
- Annual rainfall: 763.4 mm (30.06 in)

Cowes is the main township on Phillip Island in the Gippsland region of Victoria, Australia. Located approximately two hours' drive from Melbourne, it is also accessible from Melbourne by bus or passenger ferry from Stony Point on the Mornington Peninsula. Positioned on the northern coast of Phillip Island, Cowes faces French Island and the Mornington Peninsula, offering sweeping views across Western Port Bay. According to the 2021 census, Cowes had a population of 6,593. Its north-facing Cowes Beach was named the 10th best beach in Australia for 2025, known for its safe swimming conditions and family-friendly atmosphere.

== History ==
The area now known as Cowes lies on the traditional lands of the Bunurong (Boonwurrung) people of the Kulin Nation, who have lived on and around Phillip Island—known to them as Millowl—for thousands of years. The Bunurong harvested fish and shellfish from the bay, collected mutton-bird eggs, and maintained a deep spiritual connection to the land and sea. Early European explorers, including George Bass in 1798, navigated the area, naming Western Port and Phillip Island.

The first European settlers referred to the area as Mussel Rocks, due to the abundance of mussels along the rocky foreshore. In 1865, government surveyor Henry Cox returned from a holiday in England and named the surveyed township Cowes, after the seaport town on the Isle of Wight. A jetty was constructed and a ferry service was established in 1870, connecting Cowes to Stony Point. These developments marked the beginning of Cowes as a hub for shipping, tourism, and local trade.

By the late 19th century, Cowes had become a favoured destination for beachgoers, anglers, and game hunters. To accommodate increasing visitors, the Isle of Wight and Wood's Family Hotels were built in the 1870s, playing a central role in the town's social and tourism life. Cowes Post Office began operations on 1 August 1869, signifying the growing permanence of the settlement.

The main Street of Cowes is Thompson Avenue, named after William Eastwood Thompson, a long-time resident and community leader. Having first visited Phillip Island in 1889 as a child, Thompson later moved there permanently with his family and spearheaded the planting of the now-iconic Golden Cypress trees that line the street. This initiative, conducted from 1912 to 1935, involved schoolchildren and residents and has become a defining feature of the town.

During the 1920s, Cowes flourished as a seaside resort, with numerous guesthouses catering to middle-class visitors from Melbourne. The Wood's Family Hotel burned down in 1920 and was replaced by the Phillip Island Hotel, which was destroyed by fire again in the 1960s. The Isle of Wight Hotel, a prominent beachfront establishment, was rebuilt in 1927 after a fire in 1925, only to be destroyed again in 2010. With the increasing popularity of cars in the post-war era, coupled with the construction of a permanent bridge to the mainland in 1940, Cowes saw a boom in motels, caravan parks, and camping grounds. These developments helped solidify its reputation as a leading Victorian holiday destination. The Cowes Magistrates' Court, which had served the community for decades, was officially closed on 1 January 1990, reflecting changes in local governance and judicial services.

== Climate ==
Cowes possesses an oceanic climate (Köppen: Cfb), with tepid, relatively dry summers and mild, wetter winters. Average maxima vary from 24.4 °C (75.9 °F) in February to 13.2 °C (55.8 °F) in July, while average minima fluctuate between 14.1 °C (57.4 °F) in February and 7.0 °C (44.6 °F) in July. Mean precipitation is moderately low (averaging 763.4 mm (30.06 in) per annum), but rainfall is frequent, as Cowes receives 151.8 precipitation days annually (with a maximum frequency of rain in winter).

Climate data for Cowes (38.48°S 145.27°E, 12 m AMSL) (1915-1949 normals, rainfall 1882-1978)
Month	Jan	Feb	Mar	Apr	May	Jun	Jul	Aug	Sep	Oct	Nov	Dec	Year
Mean daily maximum °C (°F)	24.1 (75.4)	24.4 (75.9)	22.7 (72.9)	19.3 (66.7)	16.4 (61.5)	13.7 (56.7)	13.2 (55.8)	14.3 (57.7)	16.4 (61.5)	18.4 (65.1)	20.1 (68.2)	22.6 (72.7)	18.8 (65.8)
Mean daily minimum °C (°F)	13.3 (55.9)	14.0 (57.2)	13.0 (55.4)	11.2 (52.2)	9.5 (49.1)	7.8 (46.0)	7.0 (44.6)	7.4 (45.3)	8.4 (47.1)	9.4 (48.9)	10.6 (51.1)	12.3 (54.1)	10.3 (50.6)
Average precipitation mm (inches)	44.2 (1.74)	42.8 (1.69)	56.0 (2.20)	68.0 (2.68)	75.9 (2.99)	79.1 (3.11)	74.9 (2.95)	74.2 (2.92)	70.2 (2.76)	69.2 (2.72)	58.3 (2.30)	51.3 (2.02)	763.4 (30.06)
Average precipitation days (≥ 0.2 mm)	7.9	7.3	9.5	12.6	15.3	15.7	16.6	17.1	15.0	14.0	11.4	9.4	151.8
Source: Bureau of Meteorology (1915-1949 normals, rainfall 1882-1978)

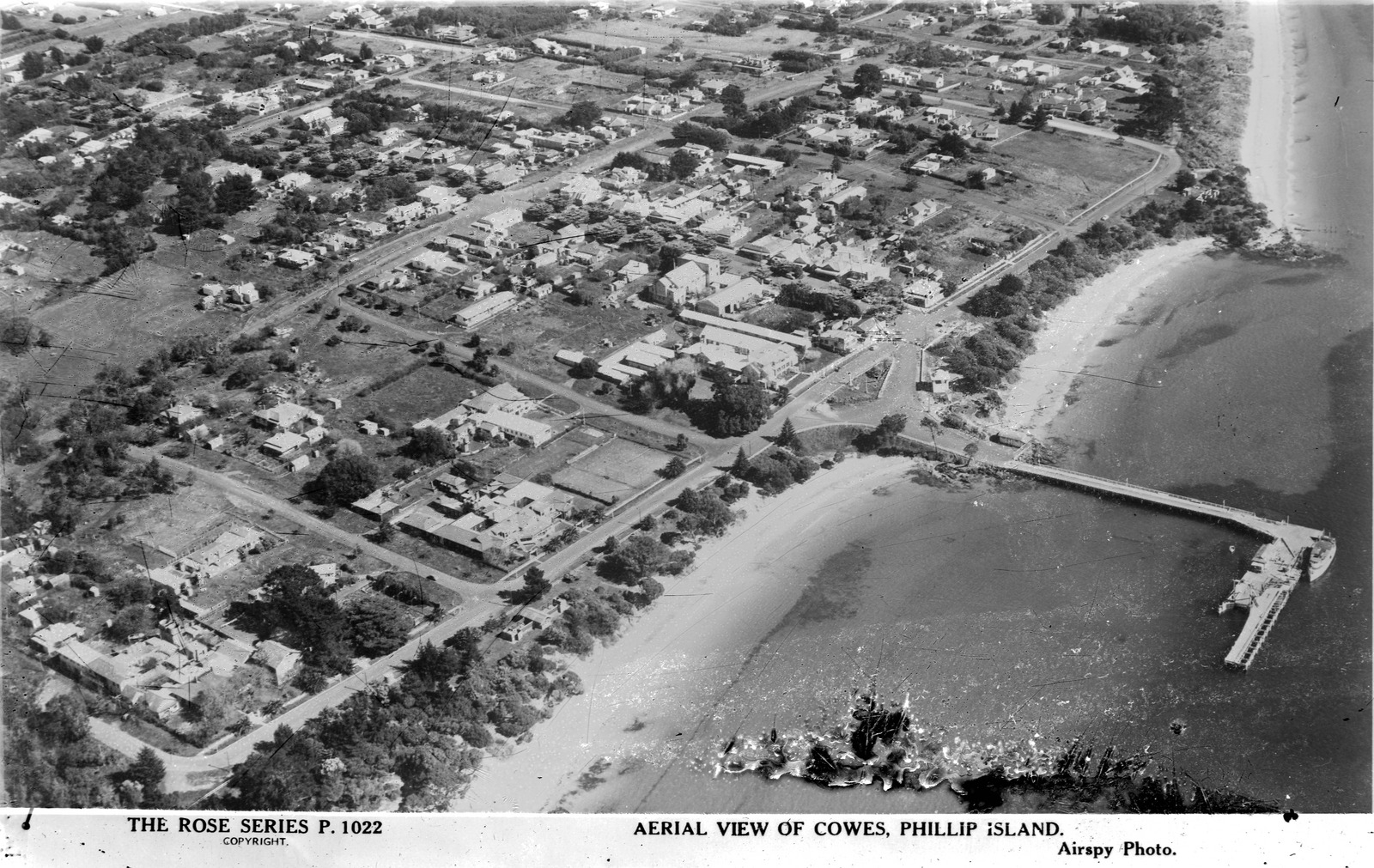
Aerial view Of Cowes, Phillip Island, in 1920

== The town today ==
In recent years, Cowes has undergone significant growth and urban development. Large housing estates and modern apartment complexes have replaced former farmlands, contributing to a transformation in the town’s character. It is estimated that approximately 70% of properties are owned by absentee owners, predominantly from Melbourne, contributing to a sharp contrast between peak holiday seasons and quieter periods.

Phillip Island Road, the island’s main artery, feeds directly into Cowes and then becomes Thompson Avenue. This tree-lined avenue, shaded by the distinctive Golden Cypress trees planted in the early 20th century, descends gently towards the waterfront foreshore, culminating in a T-intersection. Along this stretch, the density of retail outlets and dining establishments increases, forming the commercial heart of the town. Major retailers such as Coles, Woolworths Aldi, IGA and Dimmeys serve both locals and visitors.

Cowes Jetty, originally built in 1870 at the end of Thompson Avenue, remains a pivotal feature of the town. It serves as a recreational and commercial hub, hosting fishing, boating, and ferry activities. The surrounding beaches are sheltered and family-friendly, making them popular throughout the year. The town traditionally hosted a New Year’s Eve fireworks display at 9 pm, which was cancelled in 2010 due to safety concerns but reinstated in 2017. On clear days, container ships can be seen on the horizon en route to or from the Port of Hastings.

Cowes experiences significant traffic congestion and accommodation shortages during school holidays and major events, particularly those associated with the Phillip Island Grand Prix Circuit. Since the 1960s, Cowes has hosted Christian Youth Camps (CYC) on Church Street, which offer structured holiday programs for children and young adults. CYC later expanded its operations with the development of the Phillip Island Adventure Resort, a large-scale facility located just outside the town, and additional campsites at Adanac and Forest Edge.

The town is home to the Phillip Island Australian Rules Football Club, which competes in the Alberton Football League and the Phillip Island Netball club which competes in the West Gippsland competition, as well as the Phillip Island Golf Club, located on Settlement Road. These recreational amenities underscore Cowes' role as both a residential community and a holiday destination.

Phillip Island Nature Park (PINP), one of Australia’s largest and most visited conservation parks, was established in 1996 and spans over 1,805 hectares. Entirely owned by the Victorian State Government, the park includes key natural attractions such as Pyramid Rock, Rhyll Inlet, Seal Rocks, and Cape Woolamai. The park also manages structured wildlife experiences, including the Nobbies Centre —renowned for its seal, dolphin, and shark viewing—the world-famous Penguin Parade, the Koala Conservation Centre, and Churchill Island Heritage Farm. These eco-tourism destinations attract hundreds of thousands of visitors annually and play a vital role in conservation and education.

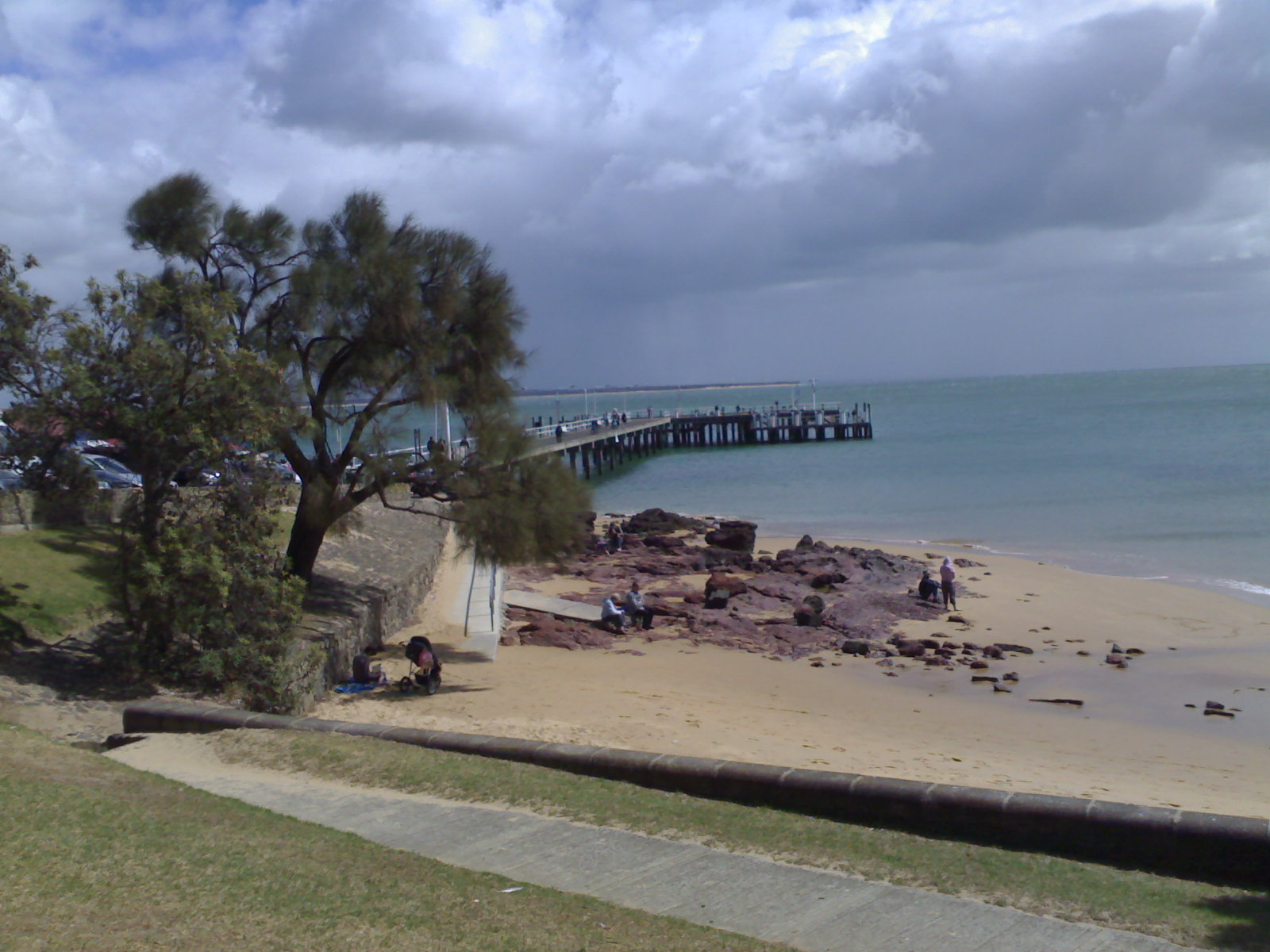
The Cowes Jetty

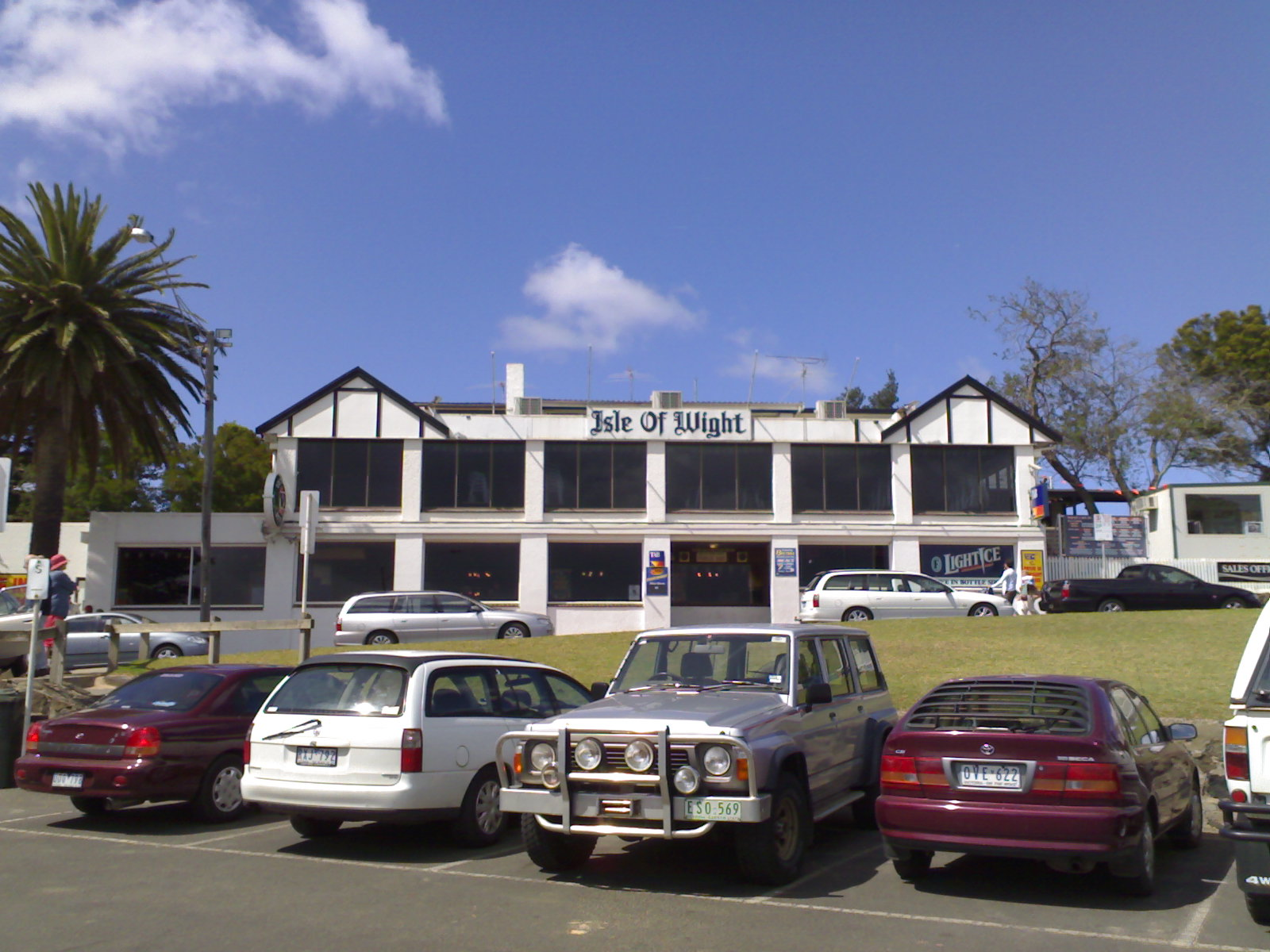
Isle of Wight Hotel, destroyed by fire in July 2010
