= State Coal Mine =

Former state-owned coal mine in Australia

Coordinates: 38.6185499°S 145.5951091°E

Section of restored underground tunnel in Division One.

The State Coal Mine, also known as State Coal Mine Heritage Area, is a former 20th-century state-owned black coal mine located in Wonthaggi, Victoria, Australia. The mine was operational from 1910 until 1968 and is now a state park and tourist attraction.

== History ==
The coal deposits at the site are estimated to be more than 150 million years old and the tunnels of the mine encompass nearly 5,000 kilometres (3,100 mi), forming an underground ring around the town of Wonthaggi. The site is located adjacent to the former railway line to Melbourne via Wonthaggi.

The State Coal Mine and the town of Wonthaggi came into being in 1909 to supply coal for the Victorian Railways. Rising from its beginnings as a makeshift "Tent Town", Wonthaggi quickly grew to the thriving town we know today. Operating from 1909 to 1968, the State Coal Mine produced almost 17 million tonnes (19 million short tons) of coal, and at its peak in 1926 the mine produced 2,435 long tons (2,474 t) per day, with the Victorian Railways buying 90% of production. It was one also of the largest and most dangerous collieries in Australia. By the 1930s, with industrial actions and coal in the larger seams running out, production had dropped, but the mine was subsidised and operated until 1968 when regular steam locomotive usage was phased out.

== Tourism ==
Today the precinct is operated by Parks Victoria and is open for the public to explore the heritage mine site. The State Coal Mine is the only historic coal mine experience in the Southern Hemisphere.

The attraction offers visitors a journey back in time to discover what life working in a coal mine was like in the 1900s. It is an educational experience, predominantly for families, to tour the underground network of tunnels and learn how Victoria's men extracted the black gold.

Key attractions include:

- Guided underground coal mine tours
- Gift shop and cafe
- Museum
- Visitor information centre
- Theatrette and interpretative centre
- Walking tracks and picnic area (BBQ facilities are available)
- Historic buildings and heritage trail

Facilities at the site underwent a $3 million upgrade in 2012 allowing underground tours to resume after an eight-year hiatus to bring them into line with new safety requirements.
