= Electoral district of Bass =

State electoral district of Victoria, Australia

Bass Victoria—Legislative Assembly
- Interactive map of electoral district boundaries from the 2022 state election
- State: Victoria
- Created: 2002
- MP: Jordan Crugnale
- Party: Australian Labor Party
- Namesake: Bass Strait
- Electors: 49,984 (2022)
- Area: 1,358 km^{2} (524.3 sq mi)
- Demographic: Rural
- Coordinates: 38°22′S 145°37′E
Electorates around Bass:
Cranbourne	Berwick; Pakenham	Narracan
Hastings	Bass	Gippsland South
Bass Strait	Bass Strait	Gippsland South

The electoral district of Bass is one of the electoral districts of Victoria, Australia, for the Victorian Legislative Assembly. It covers an area of 1,358 square kilometres (524 sq mi) south east of Melbourne, stretching from the satellite suburb of Clyde through rural areas to the coast at Inverloch and Phillip Island. It includes the suburbs and towns of Bass, Cape Paterson, Clyde, Corinella, Cowes, Grantville, Inverloch, Kilcunda, Koo Wee Rup, Lang Lang, Pearcedale, Rhyll, San Remo, Tooradin, Ventnor and Wonthaggi. It lies within the Eastern Victoria Region of the upper house, the Legislative Council.

Bass was created in a redistribution for the 2002 election. It largely replaced the abolished electorate of Gippsland West, held by independent Susan Davies. However, the seat is located in traditional Liberal territory. Its predecessors, Gippsland West and Westernport, had historically been strongholds for the conservative parties. On the new boundaries it was marginally Liberal on a "traditional" two-party basis. Davies contested Bass, but was defeated by Liberal candidate Ken Smith, who had been the member for the relevant Legislative Council seat of Gippsland Province since 1988. Smith's win was the only Liberal gain in an election which saw Labor score its biggest-ever victory in Victoria.

Smith was reelected in 2006 election with a modest swing in his favour. He was reelected handily at the 2010 election, picking up a swing large enough to revert Bass to a safe Liberal seat, as Gippsland West had been. He subsequently served as Speaker of the Victorian Legislative Assembly from 2010 to 2014.

Smith retired at the 2014 state election after losing the speakership in February 2014, when he lost the support of balance of power independent MP Geoff Shaw. Brian Paynter, a local accountant, succeeded him as Liberal candidate and member for Bass. However, Paynter was swept out after only one term by Labor's Jordan Crugnale, who became the first Labor member ever to win the seat or its predecessors. In October 2025, Crugnale announced she would not re-contest the seat at the 2026 state election.

== Members for Bass ==
Member	Party	Term
Ken Smith	Liberal	2002–2014
Brian Paynter	Liberal	2014–2018
Jordan Crugnale	Labor	2018–2026

== Election results ==
2022 Victorian state election: Bass
Party	Candidate	Votes	%	±%
Labor	Jordan Crugnale	13,478	32.6	−4.1
Liberal	Aaron Brown	12,482	30.1	−13.4
National	Brett Tessari	5,506	13.3	+13.3
Greens	Callum Bugbird	3,369	8.1	+1.9
Democratic Labour	Mark O'Neill	1,465	3.5	+1.7
Family First	Martin Verhagen	1,164	2.8	+2.8
Animal Justice	Elly Mousellis	1,085	2.6	+1.4
Freedom	Marcus Munday	1,013	2.4	+2.4
Independent	Jeni Jobe	970	2.3	+2.3
Independent	Meg Edwards	872	2.1	+2.1
Total formal votes		41,404	93.0	–0.6
Informal votes		3,135	7.0	+0.6
Turnout		44,539	89.1	+4.5
Two-party-preferred result
Labor	Jordan Crugnale	20,803	50.2	+0.9
Liberal	Aaron Brown	20,601	49.8	−0.9
Labor notional gain from Liberal		Swing	+0.9	

Primary voting results in Bass View source data.
Two-party-preferred vote results in Bass View source data.
