= Division of Monash =

Australian federal electoral division

Monash Australian House of Representatives Division
- Interactive map of electorate boundaries from the 2025 federal election
- Created: 2019
- MP: Mary Aldred
- Party: Liberal
- Namesake: Sir John Monash
- Electors: 116,527 (2025)
- Area: 8,255 km^{2} (3,187.3 sq mi)
- Demographic: Rural
Electorates around Monash:
Casey	Indi	Gippsland
La Trobe	Monash	Gippsland
Bass Strait	Bass Strait	Bass Strait

The Division of Monash is an Australian Electoral Division in the state of Victoria, which was contested for the first time at the 2019 federal election. It replaced the Division of McMillan which fell under largely the same boundaries.

The division is located in western Gippsland including Phillip Island, and extends for the length of Victoria's eastern Bass Strait coastline. As of 2025, it covers the entire local government areas of Bass Coast Shire and South Gippsland Shire, the majority of Shire of Baw Baw, and a portion of City of Latrobe. It is the southernmost Electoral Division in continental Australia.

== Geography ==
Federal electoral division boundaries in Australia are determined at redistributions by a redistribution committee appointed by the Australian Electoral Commission. Redistributions occur for the boundaries of divisions in a particular state, and they occur every seven years, or sooner if a state's representation entitlement changes or when divisions of a state are malapportioned.

When the division was created in 2018, it encompassed areas of West Gippsland and South Gippsland previously in the abolished Division of McMillan, with the exception of the suburb of Pakenham and the town of Yallourn North, which were instead gained by the Division of La Trobe and Division of Gippsland respectively. The new division also gained areas from the Division of Flinders in the Bass Coast Shire and the southern part of Shire of Cardinia, such as Koo Wee Rup, Lang Lang and Phillip Island. In 2021, it lost all areas within the Shire of Cardinia such as Koo Wee Rup and Bunyip to the Division of La Trobe. It did not undergo any boundary changes in the 2024 redistribution.

As of the 2024 redistribution, it covered the entire local government areas of Bass Coast Shire and South Gippsland Shire, and the majority of Shire of Baw Baw (except a tiny and unpopulated area near Yallourn North). It also included a small portion of City of Latrobe at Moe. It includes the towns of Warragul, Moe, Wonthaggi, Leongatha and Foster. Overall it stretches from Mount Baw Baw and the Baw Baw National Park in the north to Wilsons Promontory, and the Wilsons Promontory National Park in the south, including Phillip Island.

== History ==
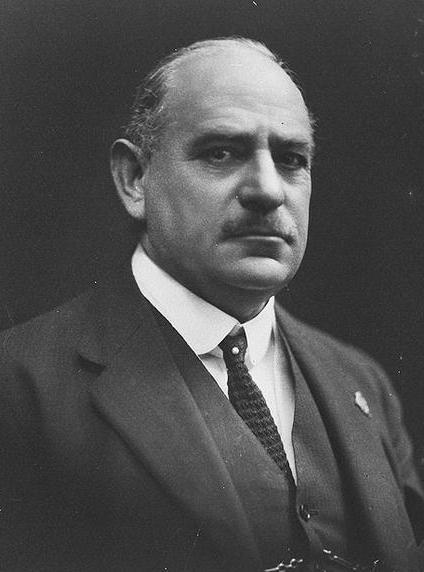
Sir John Monash, the division's namesake

Monash was created in the mandatory redistribution of divisions in Victoria by the Australian Electoral Commission in 2018. It is named in honour of Sir John Monash, an Australian Allied military commander during World War I. It replaced the similarly-located Division of McMillan in 2018.

Prior to the 2022 federal election, the seat was notionally held by the Liberal Party of Australia on a margin of 6.9%, making it a fairly safe seat for the party. It is now held on a margin of 2.9%, making it marginal. The seat gained Phillip Island at the 2018 redistribution.

== Members ==
Image	Member	Party	Term	Notes
	Russell Broadbent (1950–)	Liberal	18 May 2019 – 14 November 2023	Previously held the Division of McMillan. Lost preselection and then lost seat
	Russell Broadbent (1950–)	Independent	14 November 2023 – 3 May 2025	Previously held the Division of McMillan. Lost preselection and then lost seat
	Mary Aldred (1983–)	Liberal	3 May 2025 – present	Incumbent

== Election results ==
2025 Australian federal election: Monash
Party	Candidate	Votes	%	±%
Liberal	Mary Aldred	32,579	31.78	−6.01
Labor	Tully Fletcher	20,804	20.29	−5.31
Independent	Deb Leonard	17,529	17.10	+6.38
Independent	Russell Broadbent	10,450	10.19	+10.19
One Nation	Kuljeet Kaur Robinson	8,166	7.97	+0.43
Greens	Terence Steele	5,062	4.94	−4.92
Legalise Cannabis	David O'Reilly	3,521	3.43	+3.43
Trumpet of Patriots	Alex Wehbe	2,608	2.54	+1.84
Family First	Geoff Dethlefs	1,801	1.76	+1.76
Total formal votes		102,520	94.18	−1.14
Informal votes		6,330	5.82	+1.14
Turnout		108,850	93.46	+4.65
Two-party-preferred result
Liberal	Mary Aldred	55,451	54.09	+1.19
Labor	Tully Fletcher	47,069	45.91	−1.19
Liberal hold		Swing	+1.19	
