= Dalyston =

- Town
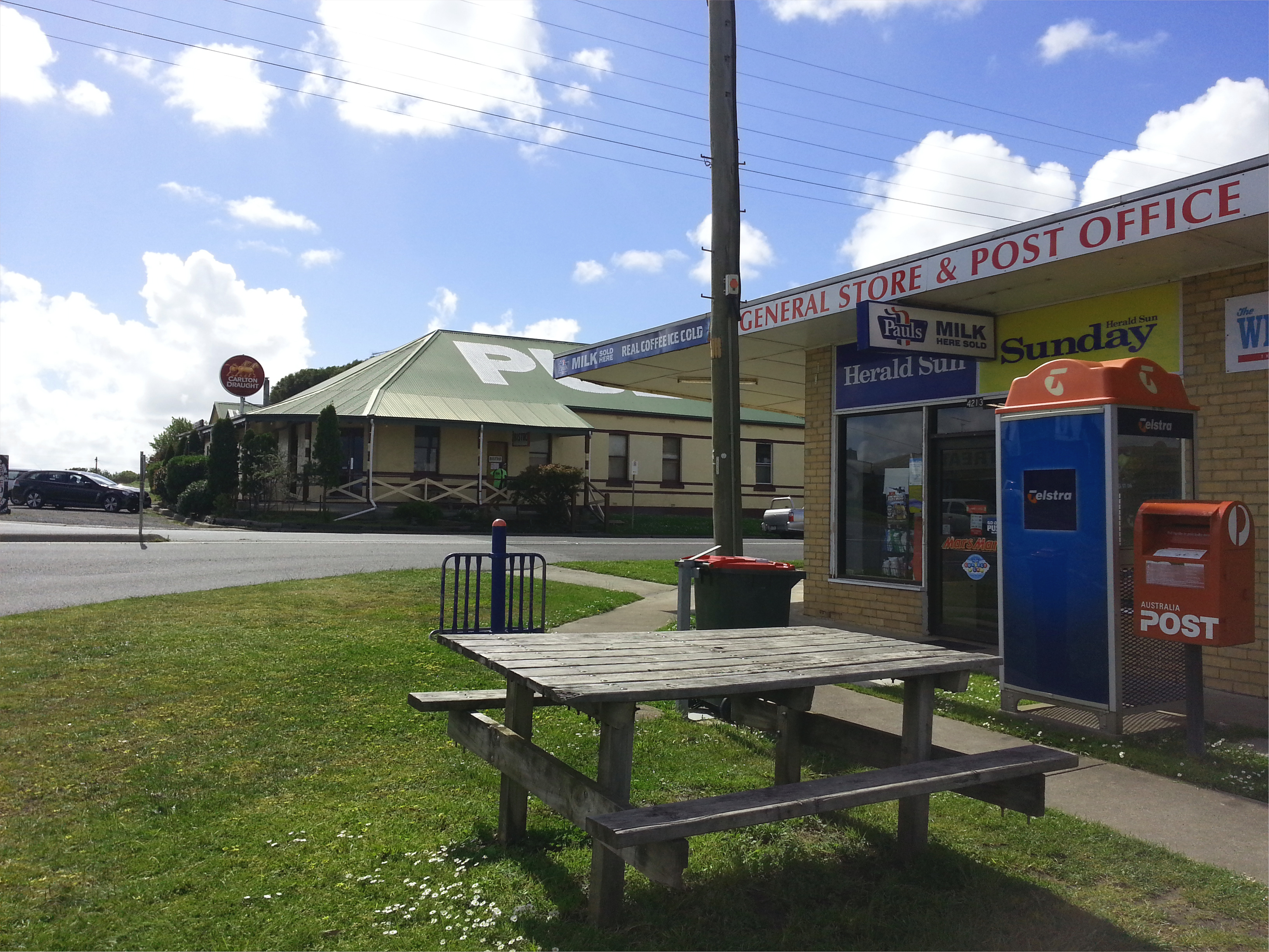
- Bass Highway

- Coordinates: 38.5473°S 145.5408°E
- Country: Australia
- State: Victoria
- LGA: Bass Coast Shire
- Location: 130 km (81 mi) SE of Melbourne; 39 km (24 mi) S of Leongatha

Government
  - State electorate: Bass
  - Federal division: McMillan
- Elevation: 34 m (112 ft)

Population
  - Total: 583 (2016 census)
- Postcode: 3992
- Mean max temp: 18.7 °C (65.7 °F)
- Mean min temp: 9.5 °C (49.1 °F)
- Annual rainfall: 920.7 mm (36.25 in)

Dalyston /ˈdælistɒn/ is a town located 125 kilometres (78 mi) south east of Melbourne via the South Gippsland and Bass Highways, in the Bass Coast Shire of Gippsland, Victoria, Australia. Known originally as a train station at Powlett River near Wonthaggi, it is now the location of the Victorian Desalination Plant, and at the 2011 census, it had a population of 606. It's Bass Coast’s fastest-growing suburb, with the 2011 census showing Dalyston’s population more than doubled from 278 residents in 2006 to 606 in 2011.

== Today ==
=== Victorian Desalination Plant ===
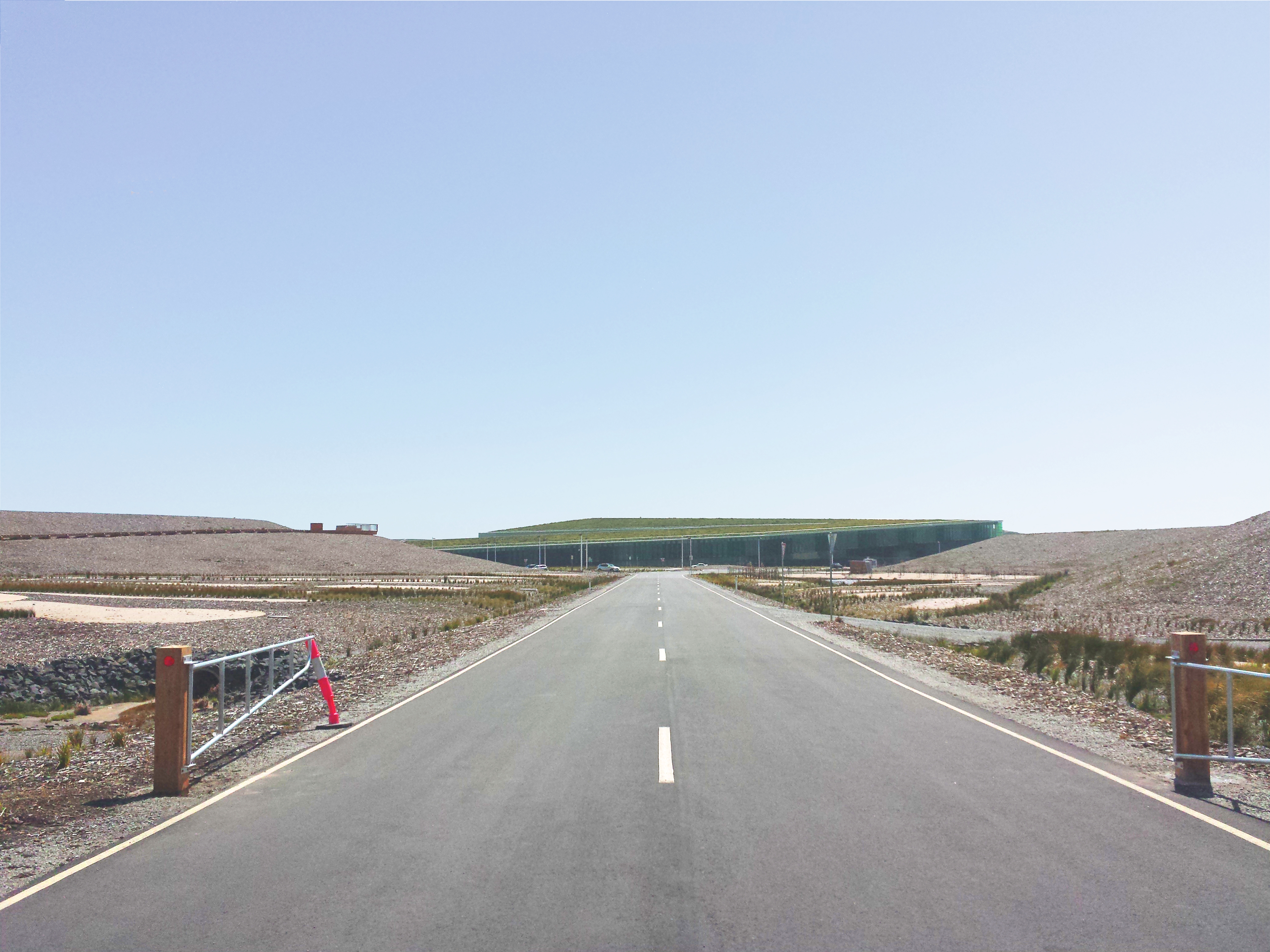
Victorian Desalination Plant, Lower Powlett Road

The Victorian Desalination Plant is a water desalination plant on the Bass Coast in Dalyston, completed in December 2012 on Lower Powlett Road. The plant is an integral part of Victoria's water system, supplying water via a series of pipelines. As a rainfall-independent source of water it complements Victoria's existing drainage basins. It produces high quality water. It is a useful resource in times of drought. Booked tours are run and plans are underway for Aquasure to open to the public. The gates open daily for public access to the 225-hectare park and 8 kilometres of walking, horse riding and cycling tracks. The plant is located next to Williamsons Beach and the Wonthaggi Wind Farm.

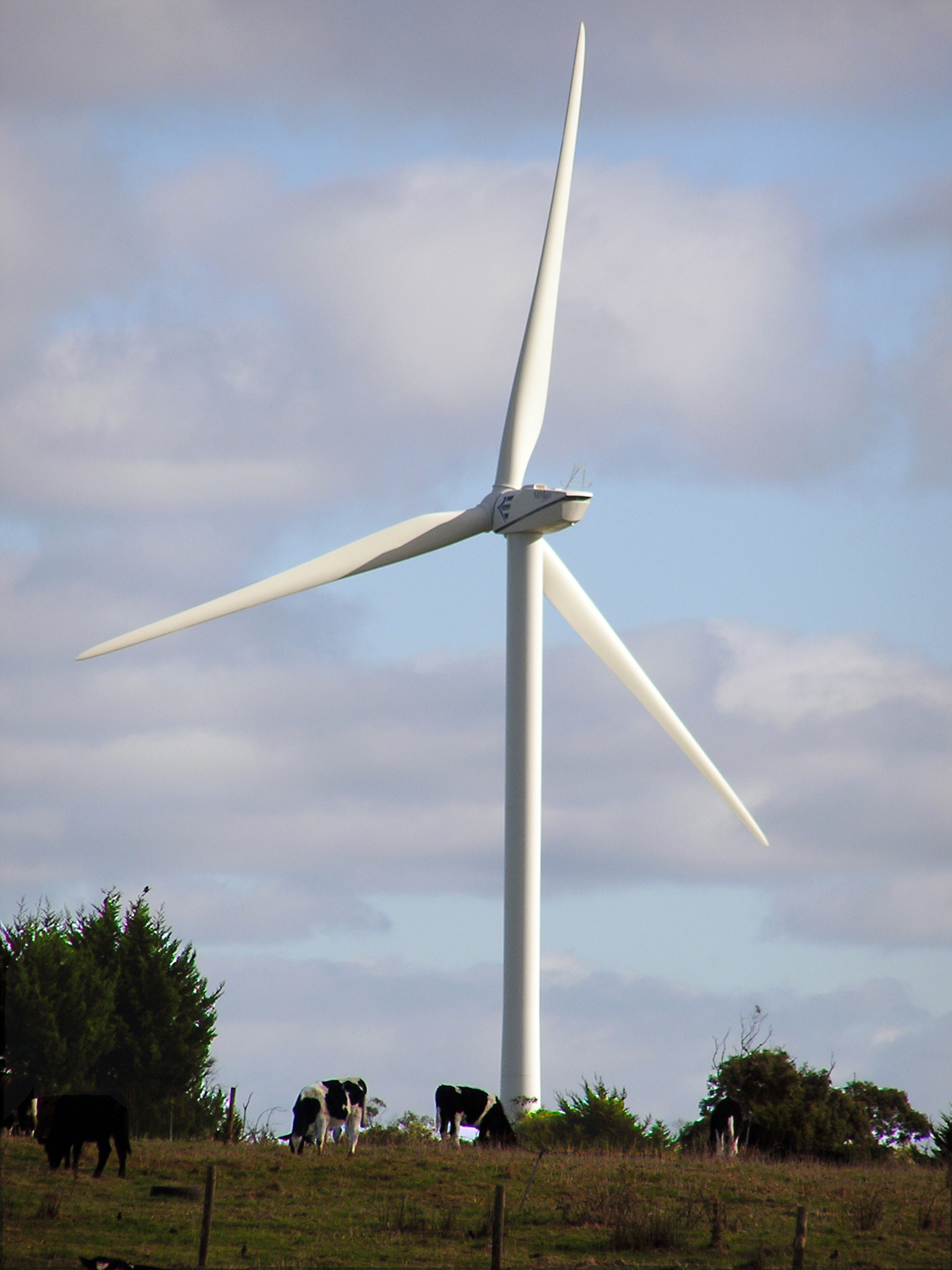
6 Turbine Wonthaggi Wind Farm From Lower Powlett Road

=== Bass Coast Rail Trail ===
Walking, cycling and horse trotting is the modern use of the old Wonthaggi railway line all year round. It is very flat and begins at Murray Street in Wonthaggi, goes through Dalyston and ends at the roundabout to Phillip Island. It goes through Dalyston at the end of Daly Street, where it crosses over the Powlett River and continues to the right for 2.7 kilometres to go over Bourne Creek trestle bridge at Kilcunda, which has panoramic views of the beach. Kangaroos can often be spotted as well as many bird species. Victoria’s only coastal rail trail, it stretches 16 kilometres from Wonthaggi to Anderson, meandering through farmland, coastal bushland, historic coal mining nature reserves and coastline with a clear view of the Wonthaggi wind turbines and remnants of coal mine buildings. An extension of the trail from Anderson to Woolamai, on Phillip Island, has not yet been made suitable for cyclists. Public toilets are situated at each town along the way. Public toilets in Anderson are situated at the bus interchange which handles connections between the San Remo and Inverloch/Wonthaggi public transport routes. The bus interchange is adjacent to the Eastern side of the Anderson roundabout.

=== Powlett River ===
Powlett River mouth is located next to Williamsons Beach. On Mouth Of Powlett Road there is a path leading to both. Powlett River mouth is located in the province of Kilcunda. Powlett River riparian and wetland is an estuary of national importance due to its ecological values. It is located alongside fertile agricultural land. Powlett River is named after Frederick Powlett, the Commissioner of the Western Port District in 1840

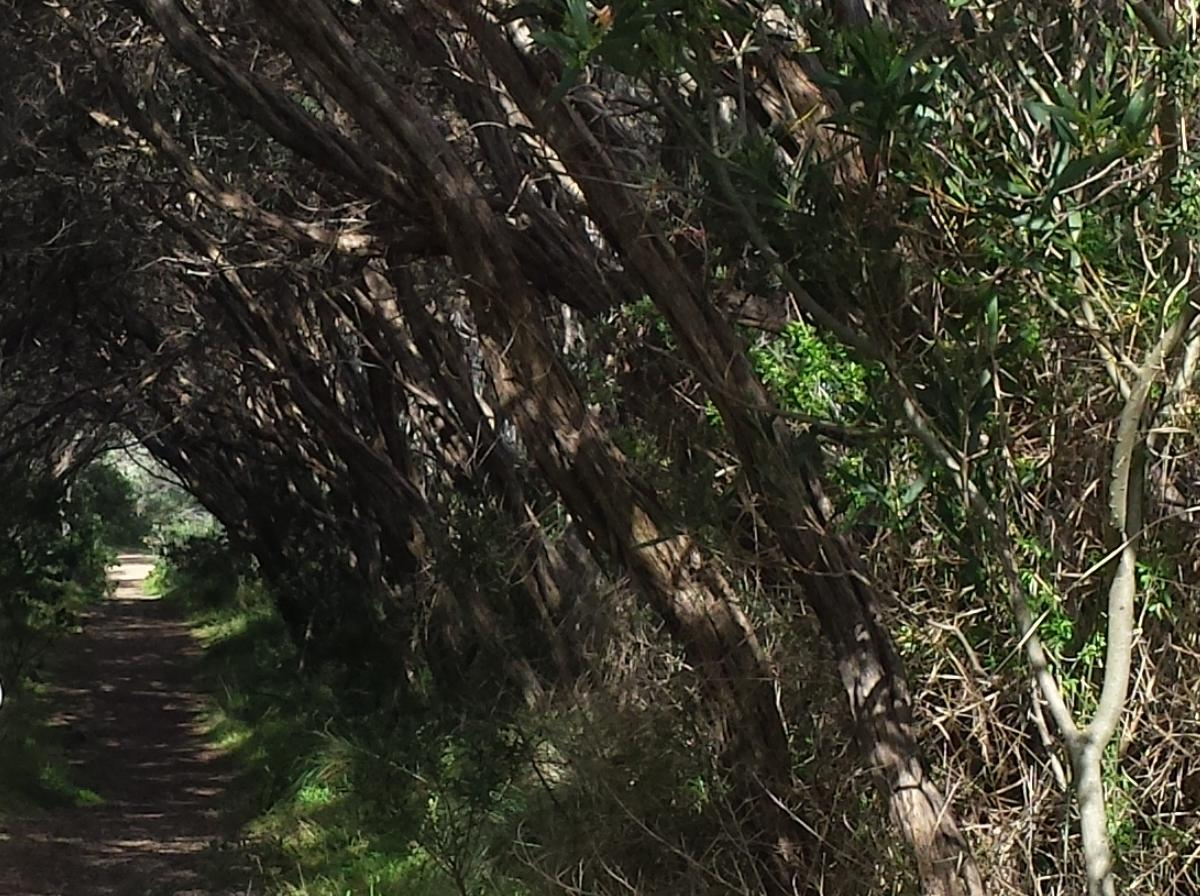
Path To Powlett River And Williamsons Beach, Mouth Of Powlett Road

=== Dalyston General Store ===
One of the states original General Stores, built in 1901 continues to provide a wide range of goods to not just Dalyston locals but all surrounding areas also. Dalyston General Store is one of the Bass Coasts most awarded retail store having taken out the Bass Coast People's Choice Award for Retail in 2018 & 2019 as well as the highly converted Gippsland Business Awards for Retail 2019. The store has also been nominated as a finalist in the National Small Business Awards for 2020.

=== Ozone Hotel ===
One of Victoria's original pubs, the Ozone Hotel on the Bass Highway has been a pub and restaurant/functions venue in its current premises since 1901. Unfortunately, it is currently shut down.

== Climate ==
Dalyston's location on the north shore of Bass Strait gives it an oceanic climate, with the moderating effect of the ocean allowing a narrower temperature range throughout the year compared to other regions in Victoria. Average daily maximum temperatures range from 23.5 °C in summer to 13.5 in winter. Frost is rare, occurring on average 6 mornings a year.

== History ==
The Bunurong aboriginal people were custodians of this stretch of coast for thousands of years prior to white settlement. The Boakoolawal clan lived in the Kilcunda area south of the Bass River, and the Yowenjerre were west of the Tarwin River along what is now the Bunurong Marine and Coastal Park. Middens containing charcoal and shellfish mark the location of their campsites along the coast.

Eventually known as ‘Price’s Corner; Dalyston was first settled by the Price family in 1856. Then in 1880 John Daly came to the district. At that time the nearest railway station was at Dandenong. John Daly built a 40 room hotel at ‘Powlett Crossing’ and this license was surrendered to the current ‘Ozone Hotel’ in 1901. The Daly family owned most of the land in the area and subdivided land around the town for business sites. The town became known as Dalyston (Daly's town) because of the Daly family and when the railway station had to have a name, Dalyston was chosen.

Dalyston station was on the Wonthaggi railway line along the Bass Coast, Victoria. Its primary purpose was to serve the State Coal Mine on what were then known as the Powlett River Coalfields. The line also provided passenger and general goods services. The station train operated from 1910 until the line's closure in 1978. Today there is almost no trace left of Dalyston Station; the site of the station is now part of the Bass Coast Rail Trail.

The Dalyston Football Club have won the following senior football premierships over their long history - 1923, 1933, 1943, 1947, 1949, 1950, 1953, 1954, 1958, 1959, 1961, 1963, 1976, 1989 and 2015.

== Education ==
Dalyston has one primary school, Powlett River Primary, with forty-two students in 2018. Children attend secondary college in nearby Wonthaggi or on Phillip Island. Also in Wonthaggi; Chisholm TAFE, Bass Coast Specialist School, Bass Coast Adult Education Centre, University of the Third Age (U3A) retirees education centre. and Connecting Skills Australia (CSA) specialist developmental school, support and employment services/training. Plans are underway for a new tertiary education facility.

== Facilities ==
- Powlett River - Track to river/estuary next to Williamsons Beach, via Mouth Of Powlett Road, picnic table
- Coast - Williamsons Beach via Lower Powlett Road (3 minute track) or Mouth Of Powlett Road (5 minute river-side path).
- Bass Coast Rail Trail - walk/cycle/trot, Daly Street or Mouth Of Powlett Road.
- Seashell Collecting is permitted on Dalyston coast from San Remo, Victoria to Undertow Bay, past Safety Beach in Browns Bay Cape Paterson - Small sizes and small quantities of empty seashells, driftwood, dead fallen twigs's, sea glass and interesting rubbish
- Victorian Desalination Plant - Aquasure, park, viewing platform, walking/horse riding/cycling tracks, booked tours, Lower Powlett Road
- Wonthaggi Wind Farm - wind turbines, tourist attraction, Campbell Street in Wonthaggi (close the gate), next to the 1 km Baxters beach track
- Powlett River Caravan Park - Mouth Of Powlett Road, Williamsons Beach, Powlett River, Victorian Desalination Plant with Park and walking/riding/cycling tracks
- Dalyston Hall - Family Dance venue, 4th Saturday every month
- Dalyston Netball Club Courts
- Dalyston Recreation Reserve/oval, home of the Dalyston Football / Netball Club.
- Cape Paterson - Safety Beach and rockpool, Browns Bay, Surf Beach Road, Cape Paterson
- Wonthaggi Golf Course - 18 hole, par 72, ACR 70, easy walk, McKenzie Street in Wonthaggi
- Wonthaggi railway station museum - open Saturday mornings, Murray Street in Wonthaggi
- State Coal Mine - museum and tours, Garden Street, Wonthaggi
- Coal mine building remnants - scattered around the region
- Wonthaggi Hospital - Smoking ban, Graham Street

== Localities ==
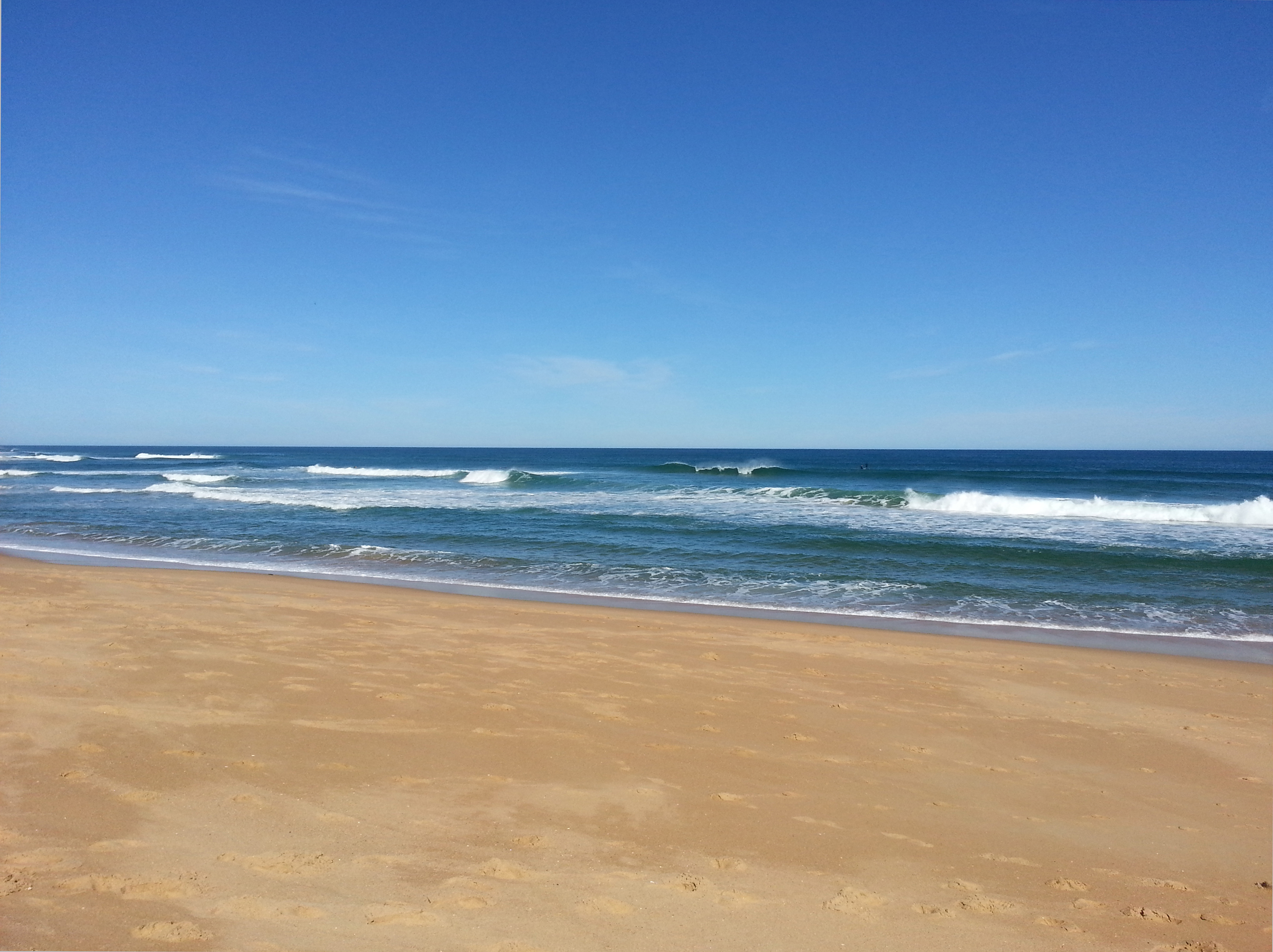
Williamsons Beach, Lower Powlett Road

Other localities in this postcode:

- Blackwood Forest
- Ryanston
- West Creek

Other localities nearby:

- North Wonthaggi
- Cape Paterson
- Harmers Haven
- South Dudley
- Anderson
- Archies Creek
- Hicksborough
- Kilcunda
- Lance Creek
- Powlett River
- St Clair
- Wattle Bank
- Woolamai
- Phillip Island
- Inverloch
- Kongwak
- Leongatha
