= Kilcunda =

- Town
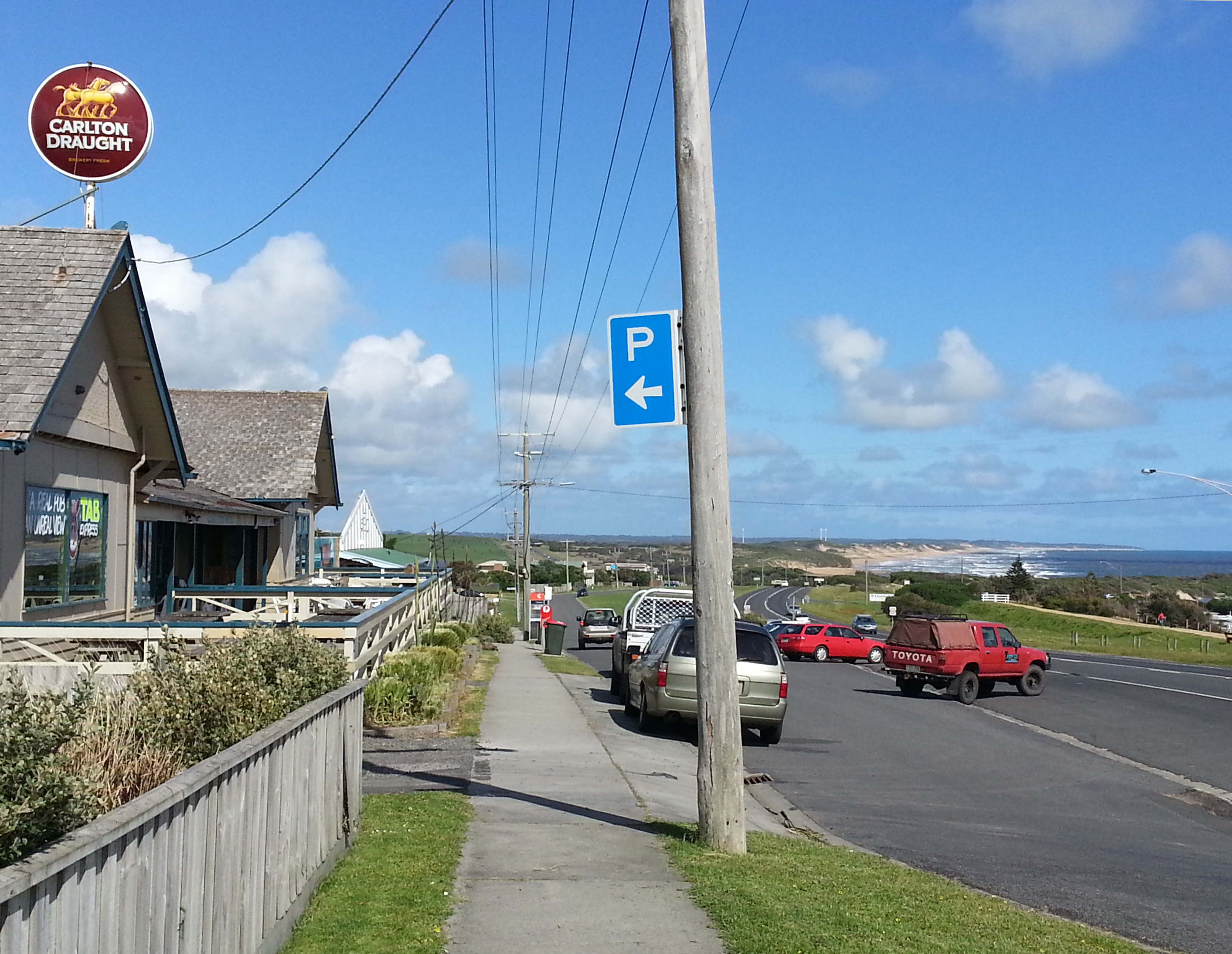
- Bass Highway

- Coordinates: 38.5498°S 145.4761°E
- Country: Australia
- State: Victoria
- LGA: Bass Coast Shire
- Location: 122 km (76 mi) SE of Melbourne; 15 km (9.3 mi) NW of Wonthaggi; 28 km (17 mi) SE of Cowes

Government
  - State electorate: Bass
  - Federal division: Monash

Population
  - Total: 578 (2021 census)
- Postcode: 3995
- Mean max temp: 18.7 °C (65.7 °F)
- Mean min temp: 9.5 °C (49.1 °F)
- Annual rainfall: 920.7 mm (36.25 in)

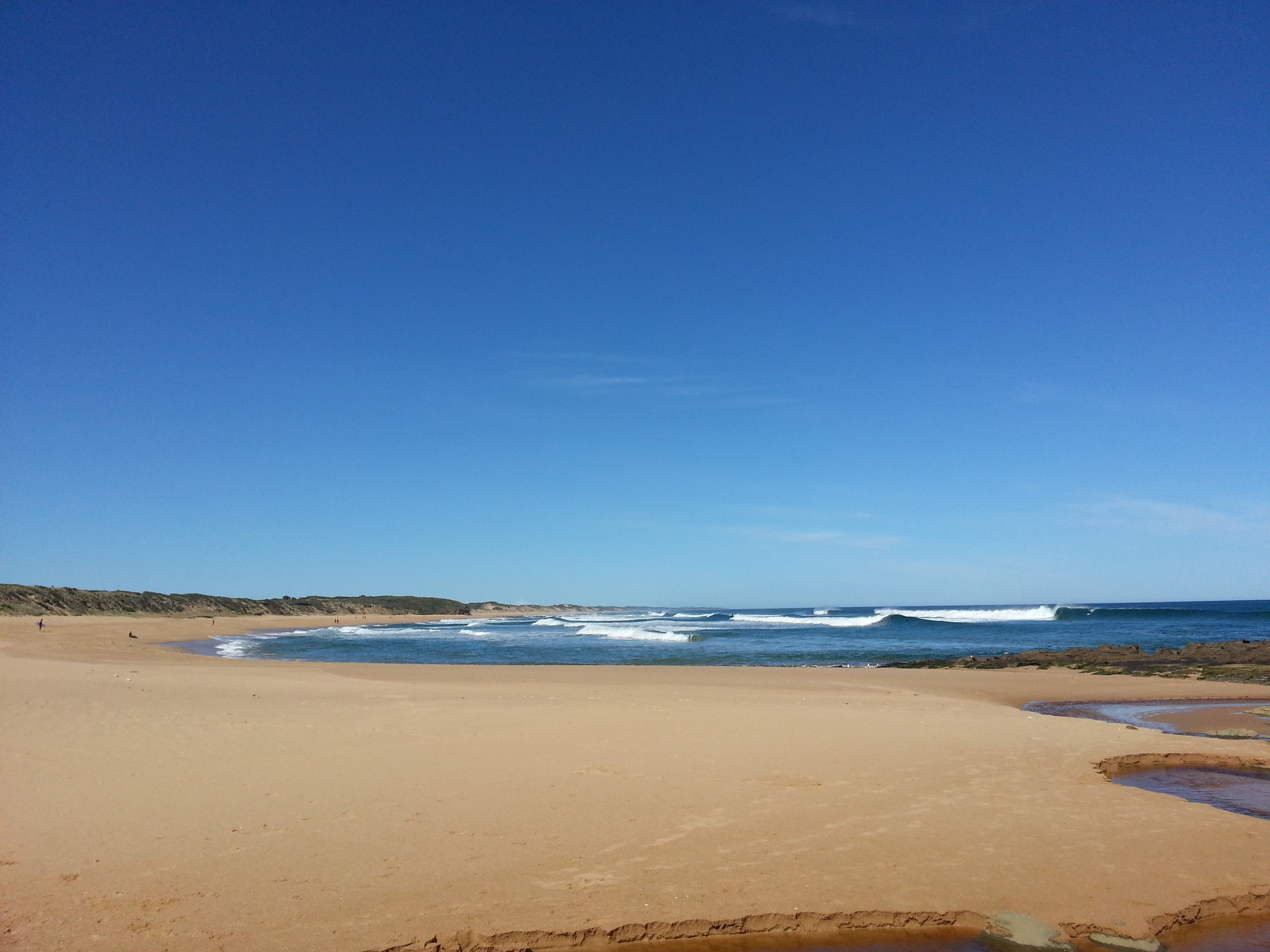
Kilcunda Beach And Bourne Creek

Kilcunda /ˈkɪlkʌndɑː/ is a seaside town located 117 kilometres (73 mi) south east of Melbourne between Phillip Island and Wonthaggi near Dalyston via the South Gippsland Highway on the Bass Highway, in the Bass Coast Shire of Gippsland, Victoria, Australia. Known originally as a train station near Wonthaggi, it is now the location of a very popular swimming hole at the Bourne Creek Trestle Bridge and at the 2016 census, Kilcunda had a population of 578.

The name "Kilcunda" is believed to be from the Aboriginal term for 'an exclamation', and is reported by one authority to mean, 'Oh dear, the sticks!'

== Today ==
=== Trestle Bridge ===
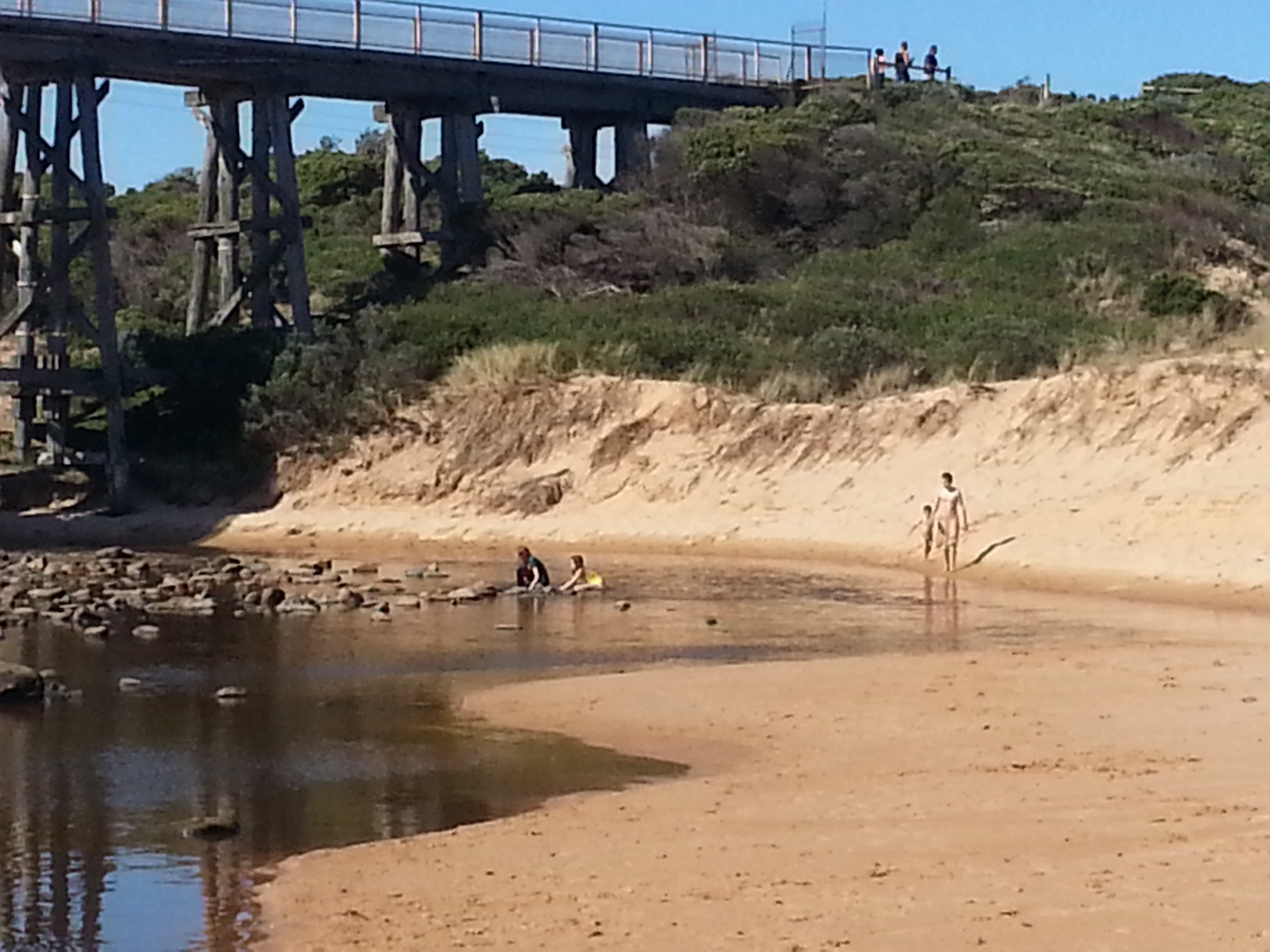
Swimmers At Kilcunda Trestle Bridge, Where Bourne Creek meets Kilcunda Beach

The 91 m long Kilcunda Bridge was built over the Bourne Creek. It is protected by the National Trust. This trestle bridge was constructed for the Victorian Railways to carry coal from what was then known as the Powlett Coal Fields. It is a particularly significant monument because most of the steam-locomotive fuel that serviced the Victorian Railways network, from 1911 until 1978, crossed over this bridge. Since disused, the bridge is now a tourist attraction and a part of the Bass Coast Rail Trail. Bourne creek spills over Kilcunda Beach and out into the sea of Bass Strait. Seashell collecting is permitted on Kilcunda Beaches.

=== Bass Coast Rail Trail ===
Walking, cycling and horse trotting is the modern use of the old Wonthaggi railway line all year round. The Bass Coast Rail Trail is very flat and begins near Kilcunda at the roundabout to Phillip Island and ends at the Wonthaggi shopping district. You can also access it all along the way, including at Kilcunda. Victoria's only coastal rail trail, it stretches 16 kilometres from Anderson to Wonthaggi, meandering through farmland, coastal bushland, historic coal mining nature reserves and coastline with a clear view of the Wonthaggi wind turbines and remnants of coal mine buildings. The trail crosses over the Powlett River and the Bourne Creek trestle bridge at Kilcunda, which has panoramic views of the beach. Kangaroos can often be spotted as well as many bird species. An extension of the trail from Anderson to Woolamai, on Phillip Island, has not yet been made suitable for cyclists. Public toilets are situated at each town along the way. Public toilets in Anderson are situated at the bus interchange which handles connections between the San Remo and Inverloch/Wonthaggi public transport routes. The bus interchange is adjacent to the eastern side of the Anderson roundabout.

=== Kilcunda Lobster Festival ===
The Annual Kilcunda Lobster Festival began in 1984 and is held on Australia Day weekend.

=== Shore Fishing ===
Very popular surf fishing area, catching Salmon, Trout and Yellow-eyed Mullet.

== Climate ==
Kilcunda's location on the north shore of Bass Strait gives it an oceanic climate, with the moderating effect of the ocean allowing a narrower temperature range throughout the year compared to other regions in Victoria. Average daily maximum temperatures range from 23.5 °C in the summer to 13.5 in winter. Frost is rare, occurring on average 6 mornings a year.

== History ==
The Bunurong Aboriginal people were custodians of this stretch of coast for thousands of years prior to white settlement. The Boakoolawal clan lived in the Kilcunda area south of the Bass River. Middens containing charcoal and shellfish mark the location of their campsites along the coast.

Originally a coal mining township, The Western Port Coal Mining Company extracted black coal from 1871. The Post Office opened on 5 August 1879. Evidence of coal mining is scattered across Kilcunda, the most famous (pictured here) is the old Kilcunda Rail Bridge on the eastern side. Commissioned in 1910 and decommissioned in the 1970s, it now forms part of the Bass Coast Rail Trail. Mitchell's Black Coal Mine ruins are on Carew Road.

== Education ==
There is a primary school in nearby San Remo, a primary school in nearby Dalyston and Wonthaggi has three primary schools and one secondary college. There is a private secondary college on nearby Phillip Island. Also Chisholm TAFE, Bass Coast Specialist School, Bass Coast Adult Education Centre, University of the Third Age (U3A) retirees education centre, and Connecting Skills Australia (CSA) specialist developmental school, support and employment services/training.

Plans are underway for a new tertiary education facility.

== Facilities ==
- Playground – Kilcunda Foreshore Reserve, Bass Highway
- Community Centre – Bass Highway
- Wonthaggi Market – every 2nd Sunday in the centre of Wonthaggi town
- Historic mine whistle sounds 12 noon every day in the centre of town – mine shaft tower, Apex Park, Murray Street
- Coast; The Arch, Black Head, Shelley Beach, Kilcunda Foreshore, Kilcunda Beach at trestle bridge and Bourne Creek, Cemetery Beach and Powlett River West.
- Seashell Collecting is permitted on Kilcunda coast from San Remo, Victoria to Undertow Bay, past Safety Beach in Browns Bay Cape Paterson – Small sizes and small quantities of empty seashells, driftwood, dead fallen twigs's, sea glass and interesting rubbish
- Bass Coast Rail Trail – Murray Street, walk/cycle or horse trot, part/all, views, toilets every town except Anderson
- Victorian Desalination Plant – Aquasure, park, viewing platform, walking/horse riding/cycling tracks, booked tours, Lower Powlett Road in Dalyston
- Wonthaggi Wind Farm – wind turbines, tourist attraction, Campbell Street in Wonthaggi (close the gate), next to the 1 km Baxters beach track
- Wonthaggi Golf Course – 18 hole, par 72, ACR 70, easy walk, McKenzie Street
- Wonthaggi railway station museum – open Saturday mornings, Murray Street
- State Coal Mine – museum and tours, Garden Street, Wonthaggi
- Coal mine ruins Carew Road and scattered around neighbouring towns

== Gallery ==
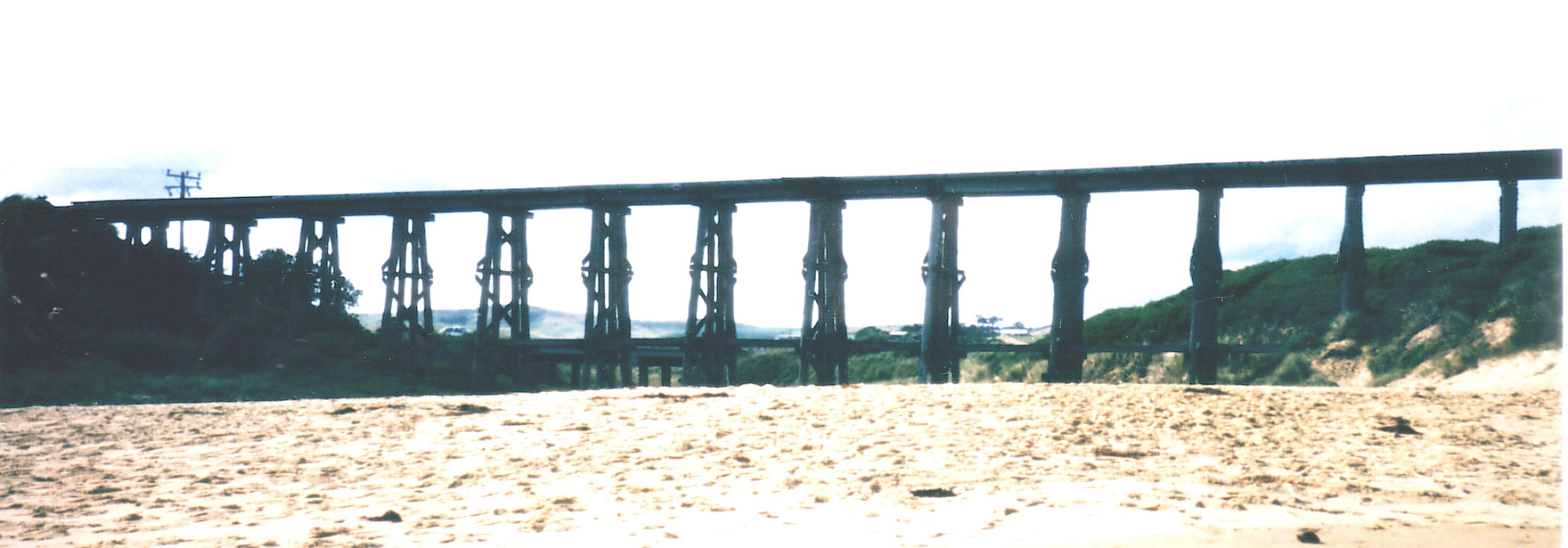
Bourne Creek trestle bridge at Kilcunda in 1989

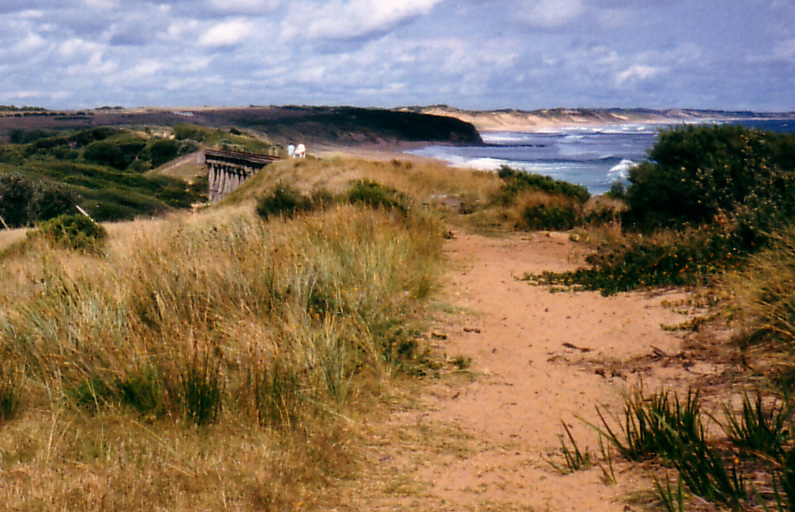
