= Victorian Desalination Plant =

Desalination plant in Australia

- Entry on Lower Powlett Rd

- Location within Victoria
- Interactive map of Victorian Desalination Plant
- Location: Dalyston, Victoria
- Coordinates: 38°35′16.8″S 145°31′33.6″E
- Estimated output: 410 megalitres (14×10^{6} cu ft) per day
- Extended output: 550 megalitres (19×10^{6} cu ft) per day
- Cost: A$5.7 billion (max) contracted to 2039
- Energy generation offset: Windfarm at Glenthompson (proposed)
- Technology: Reverse Osmosis
- Percent of water supply: Estimated 33% of Melbourne
- Operation date: December 2012

The Victorian Desalination Plant (also referred to as the Victorian Desalination Project or Wonthaggi desalination plant) is a water desalination plant in Dalyston, on the Bass Coast in southern Victoria, Australia. The project was announced by Premier Steve Bracks in June 2007, at the height of the millennium drought when Melbourne's water storage levels dropped to 28.4%, a drop of more than 20% from the previous year. Increased winter-spring rains after mid-2007 took water storage levels above 40%, but it was not until 2011 that storages returned to pre-2006 levels.

The plant was completed in December 2012, and was the largest addition to Melbourne's water system since the Thomson River Dam was completed in 1983. However, at the time, Melbourne's reservoirs were at 81% capacity, and the plant was immediately put into standby mode. The first water released for public use was in March 2017 via Cardinia Reservoir.

As a rainfall-independent source of water the desalination plant complements Victoria's existing drainage basins, being a useful resource in times of drought. It is a controversial part of Victoria's water system, with ongoing costs of $608 million a year, equivalent to .16% of Melbourne's FY2019 GDP, even if no water is ordered. Construction commenced in mid-2009. While the project will supply water for Melbourne, it is being managed by the Department of Sustainability and Environment (DSE) as a public-private partnership (PPP). DSE awarded the tender for design, build and operation to another company that will in turn supply the water to Melbourne Water, that makes payments to the plant owners and operators, Aquasure (Ventia/Suez). Melbourne Water pays the owner of the plant, even if no water is ordered, $608 million a year. That is $1.8 million per day, for 27 years. The total payment is expected to be between $18 and $19 billion. On 1 April each year, the Minister for Water places an order for the following financial year, up to 150 gigalitres a year, at an additional cost to Melbourne Water and consumers.

== Proposal ==
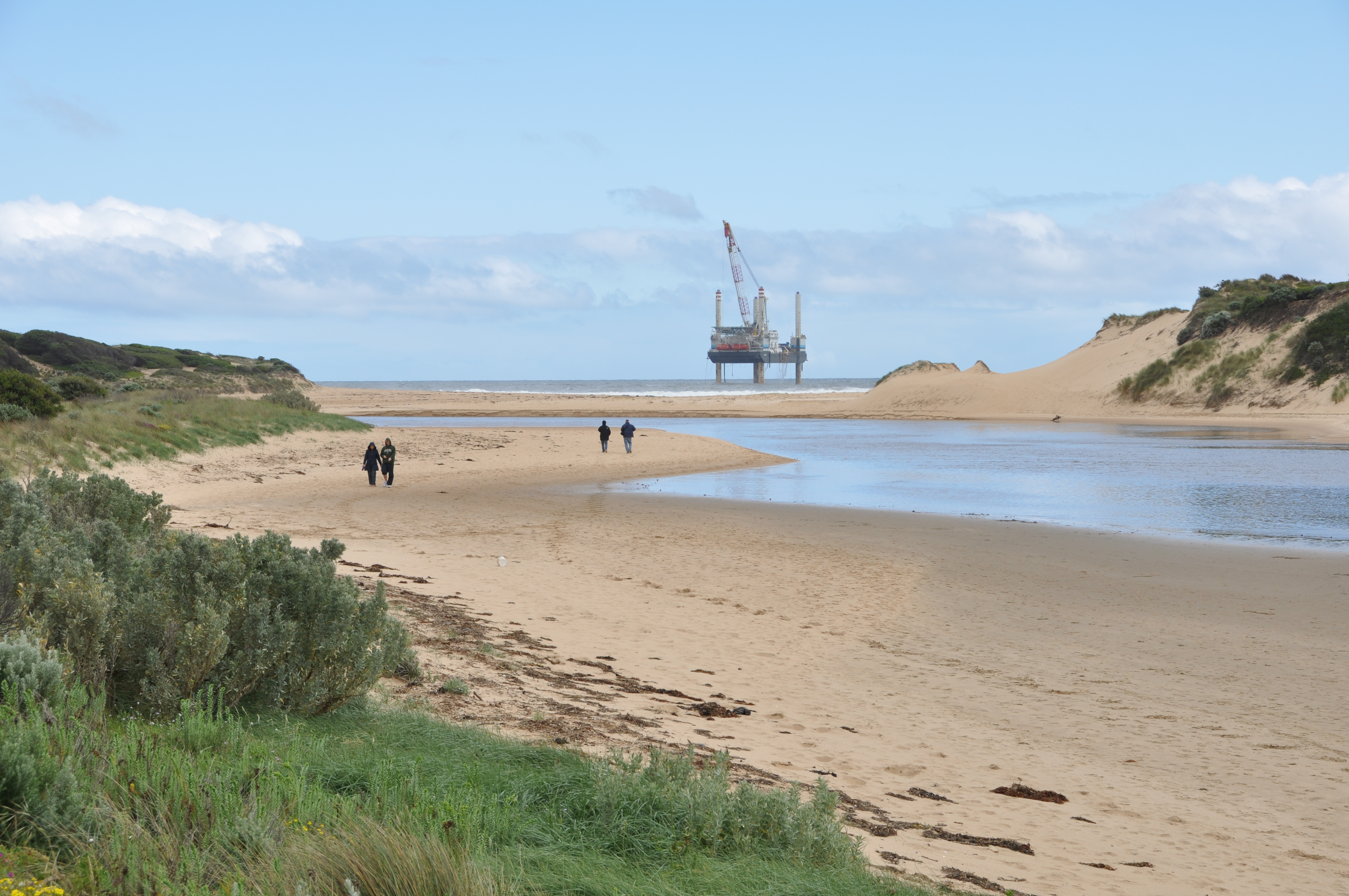
Powlett River and temporary rig near desalination plant

The potential for a desalination plant was promoted through the late 2000s in response to an increasingly severe drought which saw Melbourne's water storages go from 57.1% of capacity in January 2005 to 28.7% in June 2007.

The project was part of the Victorian Government's "Our Water, Our Future" water plan which included associated projects such as the North-South Pipeline, the Cardinia Pipeline and a proposed interconnector to Geelong. The total average inflow into Melbourne dams from 1913 to 1996 was 615 gigalitres (2.17×10^{10} cu ft) per year, while average inflow 1997–2009, during Victoria's most severe recorded drought was 376 gigalitres (1.33×10^{10} cu ft) per year.

The combination of drought and rapid population growth put pressure on reserve storage capacity which had dropped from 97.8 per cent in 1983 to just over one-quarter of maximum capacity in 2007. As a result, water restrictions were in place for several years.

The desalination plant and associated infrastructure includes tunnels connecting the plant to marine intake and discharge structures up to 1.2 km (1/2 mi) out to sea, an 85-kilometre (55 mi) pipeline to connect the plant to Melbourne's water supply system, and power supply infrastructure for the plant.

The plant can provide up to 150 gigalitres (5.3×10^{9} cu ft) of additional water a year, with the potential to expand production to 200 gigalitres (7.1×10^{9} cu ft) per year.

A two-headed marine structure extends up to 2 km (1 mi) offshore was to be temporarily constructed. The plant takes in 480 billion litres (1.1×10^{11} imp gal; 1.3×10^{11} US gal) of seawater and pumps back 280 billion litres (6.2×10^{10} imp gal; 7.4×10^{10} US gal) of saline concentration every year.

A six turbine windfarm was built in 2005 and is located at Glenthompson to offset the facility's electricity use.

Estimated water production is 150 gigalitres (5.3×10^{9} cu ft) of desalinated water per year, potentially providing around a third of Melbourne's annual water consumption (based on 2007 consumption levels). It is intended that the water produced will be supplied to Melbourne, Geelong, Western Port and South Gippsland.

The intake pipes for the desalination plant are located over 1 kilometre (1/2 mi) out to sea.

== Environmental effects studies ==
In August 2008, a 1,600-page environmental effects study report was prepared and found that "...several protected species could be affected by the plant's construction and operation – including the orange-bellied parrot, the growling grass frog and the giant Gippsland earthworm – but none would be left 'significantly' worse off". The community was given 30 business days to respond to the report. Watershed Victoria claimed that this was insufficient time for community groups to analyse the report and prepare submissions.

== Contract to build and operate ==
There were eight tenderers for the contract for the construction and operation of the plant, with two consortia being short-listed – AquaSure (Ventia Contractors/Suez) and BassWater (John Holland Group/Veolia Environmental).

On 30 June 2009, the AquaSure consortium, which is made up of Degrémont, Macquarie Capital and Ventia Contractors, was named the winning bidder. Simultaneously, it was announced that construction was scheduled to commence in late 2009, proposing that water be delivered by late 2011.

A$1.8 million per day fee is payable to the construction consortium. This minimum fee that is payable for 27 years after completion. Even if no water is required, the total payment is between $18 and $19 billion.

== Location ==
Overlooking the carpark, control building and entrance

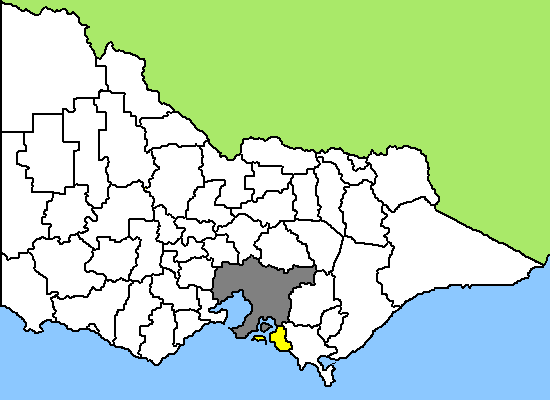
Bass Coast region of Victoria, indicated in yellow

Nine sites were included in the feasibility study's "long list", and subsequently reduce to four (Surf Coast, East of Port Philip Bay, West of Western Port, and Bass Coast). The Bass Coast was chosen as the premium location. Compulsory acquisition notices were issued to affected residents on 25 January 2008.

The site is a 20-hectare (49-acre) area in Dalyston next to Williamsons Beach on the Bass Coast in south-eastern Victoria. It is between Wonthaggi and Kilcunda and near the Powlett River.

The site is located on the lands and waters of the Boonwurrung Nation, specifically the Boakoolawal clan of First Nations Australians, in the area south of the Bass River before European colonisation. There are Middens containing charcoal and shellfish that mark the location of their settlements along the coast. Many significant archaeological artifacts have previously been discovered around the construction site, including Australia's first dinosaur bone, the Cape Paterson Claw, discovered nearby in 1903 near what is now Bunurong Marine National Park in Inverloch.

Plans are underway to build a much larger, wind farm at Glenthompson to offset the electricity used by the desalination plant.

The site is located in the Powlett River Coal Fields where the State Coal Mine produced most of the steam-locomotive fuel that serviced the Victorian Railways network, from 1911 until 1978.

== Cost ==
The capital cost for the project was initially estimated to be $2.9 billion in the initial feasibility study; this was later revised to $3.1 billion and then to $3.5 billion. After the winning bidder was announced it was revised to $4 billion.

Operating costs are to be charged by a private firm over a 25–30-year period and are estimated to be around $1.5 billion. This cost includes labour, replacement of membranes, chemicals costs and energy, and it was initially estimated at $132 million per annum. Unlike previous water infrastructure works in Melbourne, the plant will be built and operated as a public-private partnership.

A 2008 report by the Water Services Association of Australia, modelling several national water-supply scenarios for 2030. It determined that sourcing water supply by seawater desalination was the most energy-intensive. The report predicted that if desalination was the primary source of supplying around 300 litres (66 imp gal; 79 US gal) per person per day, energy use would rise by 400% above today's levels.

On 12 December 2009 The Age newspaper published details of considerable areas of land made cheaply available to the plant's developers without the value of that land being included in the project's official costs.

The average water bill for residents living in Melbourne was estimated to rise by more than 60 per cent over the following five years, while the Essential Services Commission estimated it might rise up to 96 per cent.

Then Minister for Water Tim Holding, stated that "Melbourne residents need to help pay for major water infrastructure projects, such as the desalination plant and the Sugarloaf (North South) pipeline."

By comparison, the Kwinana Desalination Plant in Perth, Western Australia, was completed in 2006 with approximately 30–50 per cent of the output of the Wonthaggi plant. It cost $387 million to build and did not include an 85 km (55 mi) pipeline and windfarm.

== Energy consumption ==
The plant is estimated to require 90 MW of electricity to power the plant and transfer pipeline when operating at 150GL capacity.

The owners state it is 100% offset by renewable energy, however they also state it would be "impractical" to directly supply the plant with renewable energy sources such and wind and solar, instead purchasing "renewable energy credits" (also known as Carbon Credits) to offset the coal powered energy the plant in fact uses.

== Opposition ==
The project encountered opposition from community groups and local residents, and the Australian Greens and the business fundamentals were challenged during feasibility studies and assessments of Melbourne's water supply needs.

Regular public rallies were conducted on the site and in Melbourne.

The community group Your Water, Your Say was one of the first organised opposition group. It was sent bankrupt after it lost a legal case after the group pursued the Victorian Government over lack of reports and consultation. The case centred on initial water requirement figures, feasibility studies and environmental effects reports among other issues. More recently, a new opposition group Watershed Victoria, has continued the opposition campaign. The government pursued legal costs, which sent the group bankrupt.

Public rallies and protests were held at the site near Wonthaggi and in Melbourne on Spring Street outside the State Parliament buildings during 2007, 2008 and 2009.

At a July 2008 protest several people were removed from Crown land, but none were arrested.

In June 2009, a petition including 3,000 signatories opposing the plant was presented to the Victorian Parliament.

=== Your Water Your Say v Minister for the Environment, Heritage and the Arts ===
Your Water Your Say (YWYS) opposed the proposal, taking legal action against the Victorian State Government regarding non-disclosure of financial information and lack of environmental studies and reports. As of July 2008 YWYS lost the action, and the Federal Court awarded costs to the State Government estimated to be up to $200,000, effectively rendering the community group broke. YWYS was subsequently disbanded.

In its submission response to the Environmental Effects Statement, YWYS stated: "The Federal and State Governments are aware that YWYS is unlikely to be in a position to pay its significant legal costs and hence their apparent inability to make a decision on this front can only be interpreted as an attempt to further avoid community scrutiny of this project."

=== Sharing of private information with private consortia ===
In December 2009, it was revealed that private information obtained by Victoria Police during surveillance efforts on individuals involved or corresponding with YWYS, Watershed Victoria and other community groups, had been made available to the private consortium building the desalination plant, Aquasure, via a memorandum between the State Government, Victoria Police and Aquasure. Victoria Police responded by explaining that the information would be used to better "manage" future activities and potential "security threats".

== Public access ==
Booked tours are run and plans are underway for Aquasure to open to the public. The gates open daily for public access to the 225-hectare (560-acre) park and 8 kilometres (5 mi) of walking, horse riding and cycling tracks. The plant is located next to Williamsons Beach and the Wonthaggi Wind Farm, Wonthaggi.

== Timeline ==
=== 2007 ===
- 19 June – the Victorian Government announced its intention to develop a seawater reverse osmosis desalination plant on the coast near Wonthaggi. The plant is explained to be part of a water plan marketed as Our Water Our Future.
- 28 December – the Minister for Planning for the Victorian Government determines that the project would require assessment under the Environment Effects Act 1978 and preparations for an Environment Effects Statement (EES) begin.

=== 2008 ===
- 25 January – Compulsory acquisition notices issued to the residents of the proposed site.
- 4 February – the Federal Government determines that the project will have to require approval under the Environment Protection and Biodiversity Conservation Act 1999 (EPBC Act).
- 21 February – 13 March – draft scoping requirements for the EES placed on public exhibition.
- 4 May – final scoping requirements for the EES issued.
- 13 June – Justice Heerey awards costs to the Federal and State Governments a result of the action – Your Water Your Say v Minister for the Environment, Heritage and the Arts & Anor; Federal Court Proceeding VID188/2008.
- 5 July – The plant is addressed during the Climate Emergency Rally at various locations in Melbourne.
- 100 m (330 ft) of coastline is landscaped to alter the flow of Powlett River.
- 20 August – 30 September – Environment Effects Statement (EES) released for public comment by the State Government, community given 5 weeks to submit responses to the 1,600-page report.

=== 2009 ===
- 11 January – Minister for Planning Justin Madden approved a planning scheme amendment to allow for a pilot desalination plant to come into effect on 17 January.
- 30 July – Winning bidder for construction announced.
- 6 October – Construction commenced.

=== 2010 ===
- 4 February – First sections of the new pipeline are laid

=== 2012 ===
- Production and related operations commenced at end of year
- "Zero water order" for financial year 2012–2013 and plant immediately put into standby mode

=== 2017 ===
- 19 March – Victorian Government announces the first water from the Wonthaggi Desalination Plant was now flowing into Cardinia Reservoir.

=== 2018–2019 ===
- Owing to dry conditions, two consecutive orders were placed for 100 GL and 125 GL of water, expected to meet a quarter of Melbourne's water demand, placing upwards pressure on water prices.

=== 2035–2045 ===
- Contract for the operation of the plant expected to expire.

== Media ==
Construction of the plant was described in an episode of Build It Bigger, which aired on the Discovery Channel and the Science Channel in the United States in 2011.

== Photos ==
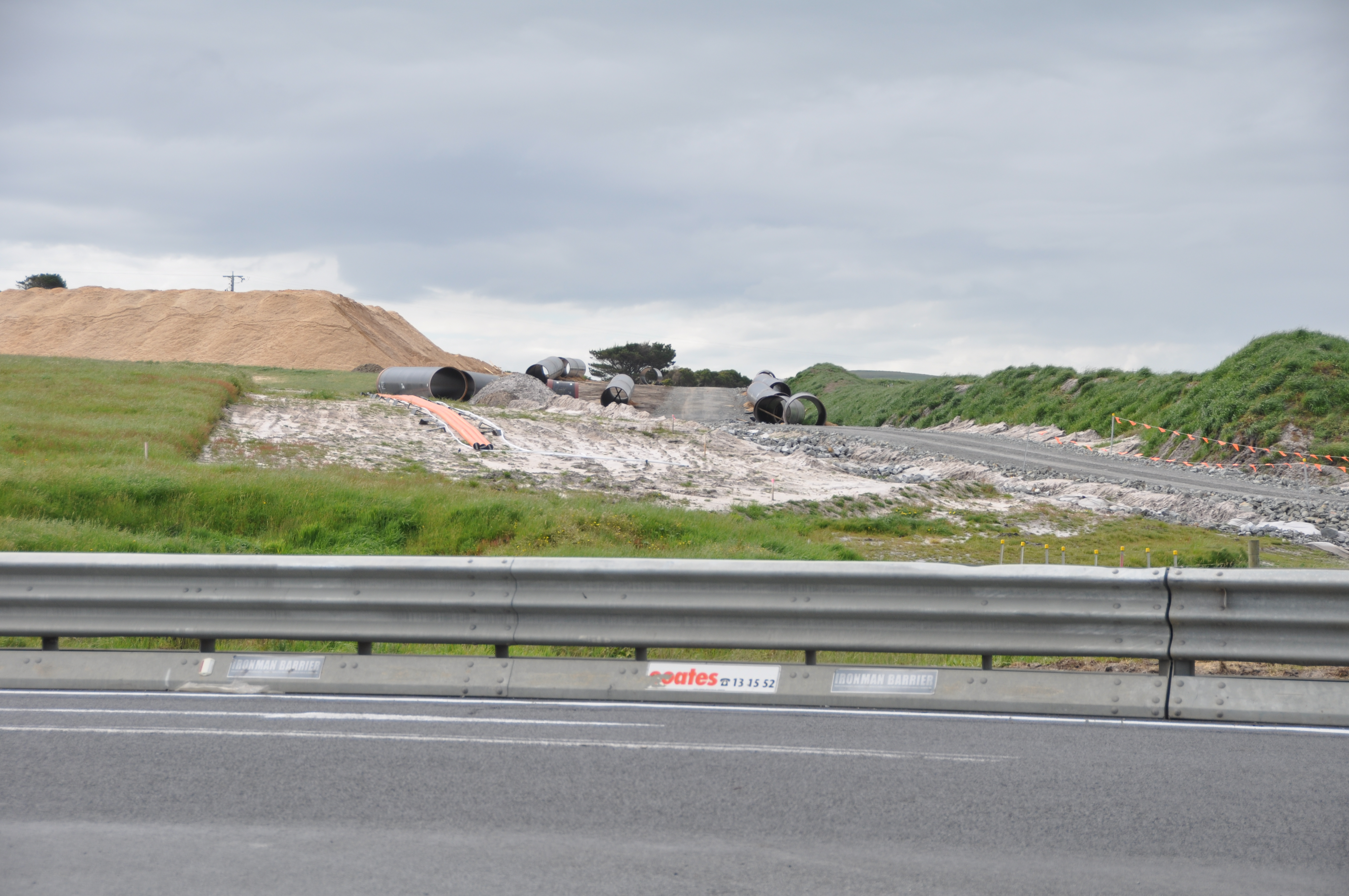
Construction of pipeline to Melbourne from Wonthaggi desalination plant

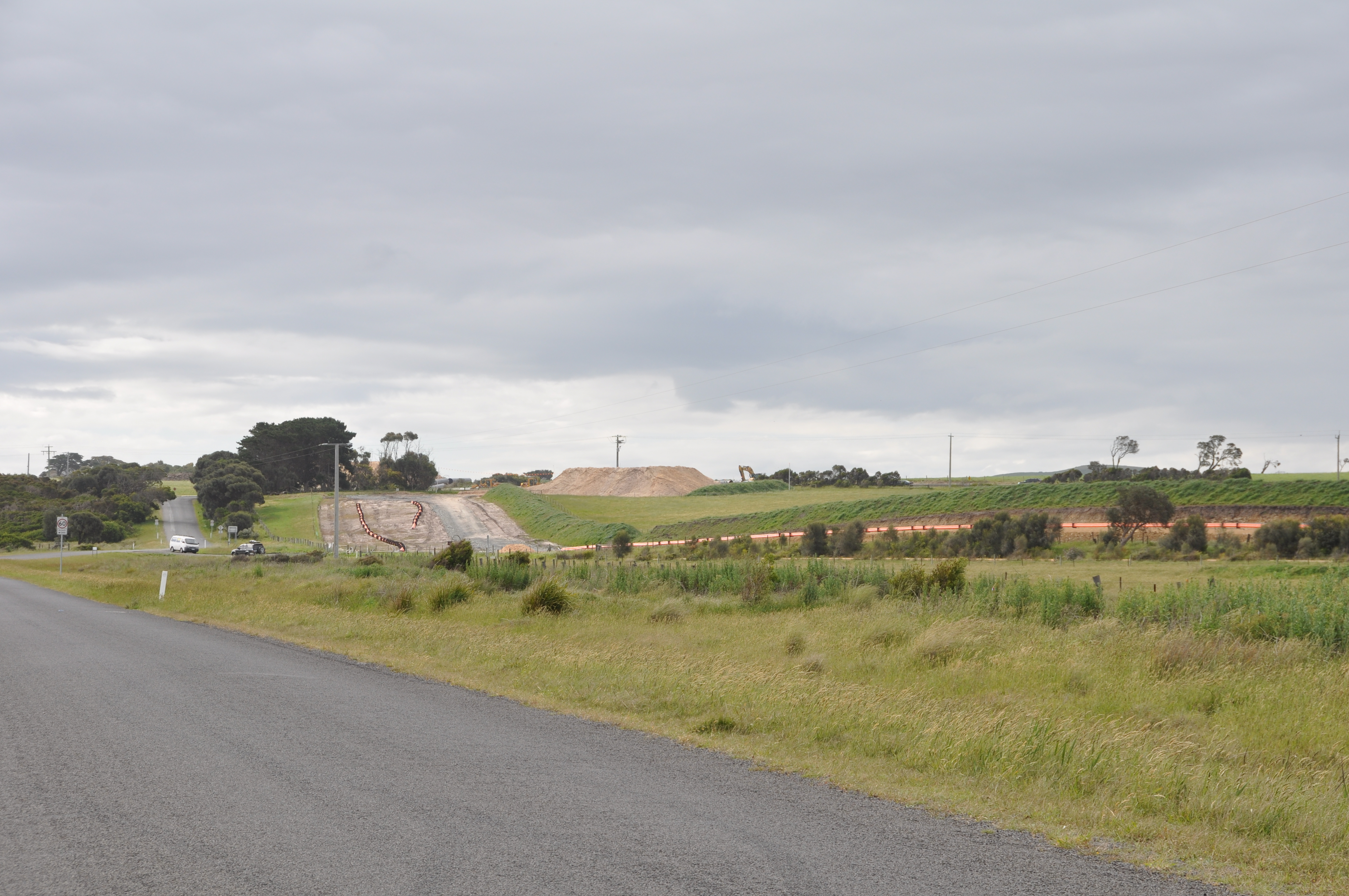
Construction of pipeline to Melbourne from Wonthaggi desalination plant

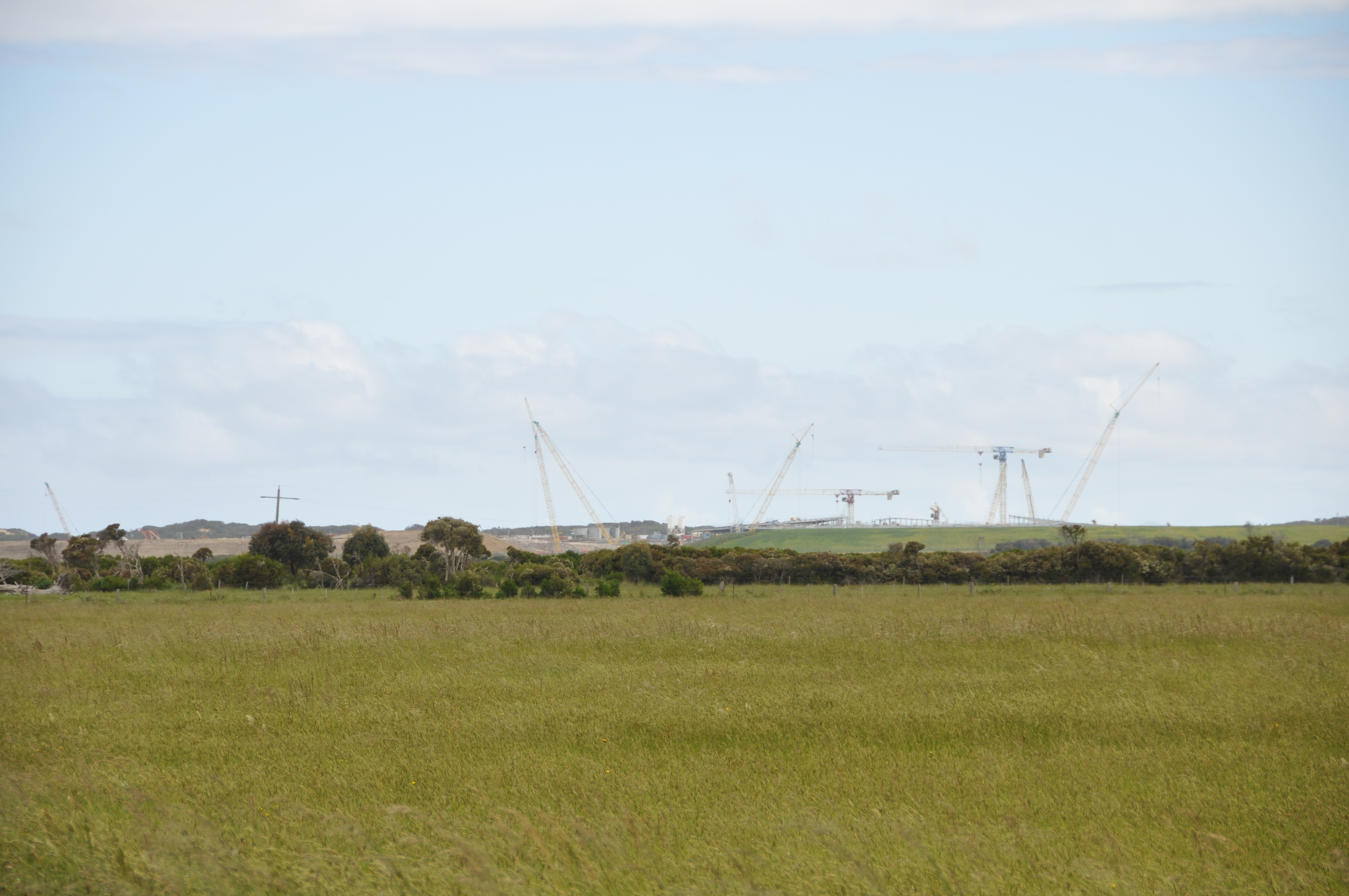
Wonthaggi desalination plant construction in progress

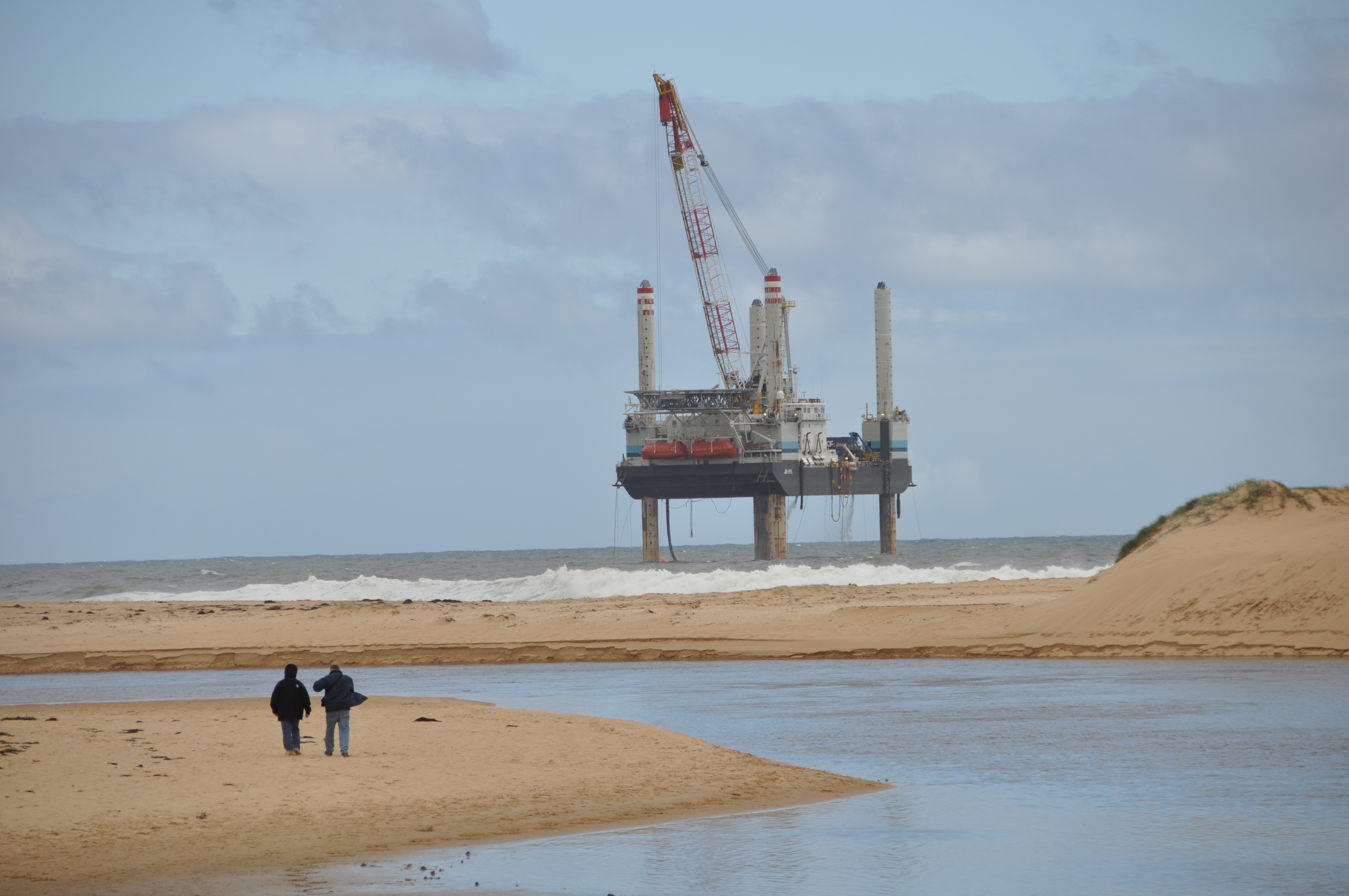
Powlett River and rig near Wonthaggi desalination plant

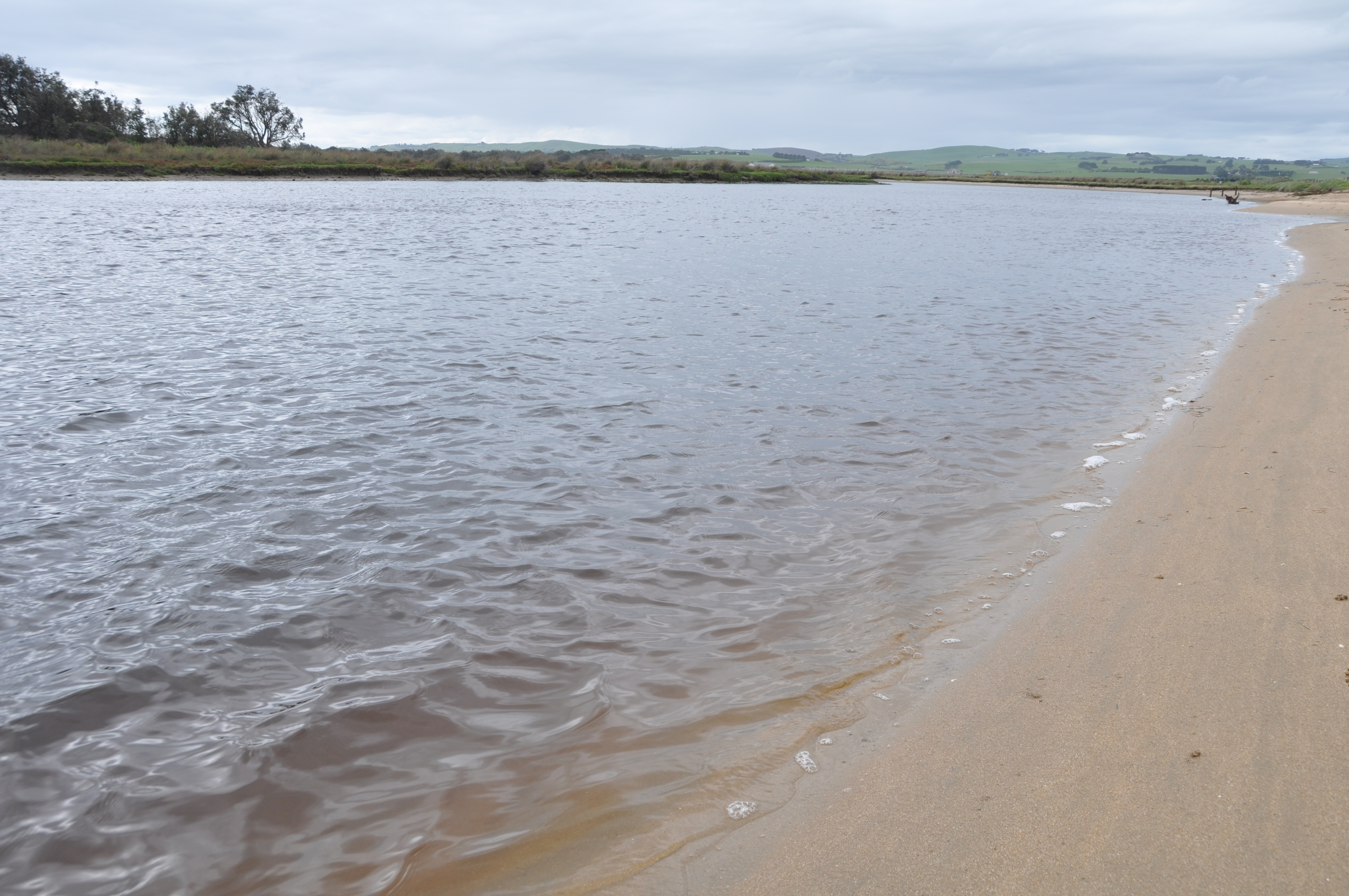
Powlett River estuary near site of Wonthaggi desalination plant

== See also ==
- List of desalination plants in Australia
- Reverse osmosis plant
