= Kirrak railway line =

Former railway line in Victoria, Australia

Coordinates: 38°35′44″S 145°38′11″E

Kirrak was a railway branch line, it was built in 1939 to service the Kirrak Coal mine located near the town of Wonthaggi, Australia. The last day of operation of the mine was Fri 20 December 1968. Monash Railway Club chartered the local 102 hp [75 kW] Walker railmotor to travel to State mine and to Kirrak mine that day. The last wagons of coal were not removed from Kirrak until the end of the month. All references to the line were removed from railway records in 1976. The photo in the external link was taken at State mine, not at Kirrak.

Preceding station	Disused railways	Following station
Wonthaggi	Wonthaggi line	Terminus
	List of closed railway stations in Victoria	
