= Anderson railway station, Victoria =

Former railway station in Victoria, Australia

Coordinates: 38°31′34″S 145°26′52″E

Anderson

General information
- Line: Wonthaggi
- Platforms: 1
- Tracks: 2 (Originally 4)

Other information
- Status: Closed

History
- Opened: 1910
- Closed: 1978

Services
Preceding station	Disused railways	Following station
Woolamai	Wonthaggi line	Mitchell's Siding
	List of closed railway stations in Victoria	
Location

Anderson was a railway station on the Wonthaggi line located near Anderson, Victoria.

Construction of the line to a new coal mine at Wonthaggi became an urgent priority of the Victorian Government in late 1909 due to coal supply issues. A route from the nearest railhead at Woolamai was hastily surveyed, which instead of travelling directly south-east toward Wonthaggi initially ran south-west in order to cross the foothills of the Strzelecki Ranges. This carried it through the township of Anderson's Corner. In April 1910, with work on the line nearing completion, the station near the township was named Anderson. A. Nugent was appointed inaugural stationmaster.

The station operated until the line's closure in 1978. The site of this station is now a carpark and the starting point of the Bass Coast Rail Trail.
