= Bass Coast Rail Trail =

Rail trail in Victoria, Australia

- Length: 16 km
- Location: Melbourne, Victoria, Australia
- Difficulty: Easy
- Hazards: Variable track maintenance
- Surface: Packed gravel and sand
- Hills: Minor undulating hills
- Water: Available in most towns
- Train: N/A
- Bus: Available in Wonthaggi

The Bass Coast Rail Trail is a rail trail located in the Bass Coast Shire of Gippsland, Victoria, Australia.

The trail has been constructed along a section of the former Wonthaggi line. The trail starts at the former Anderson station and finishes shortly after the former Wonthaggi Station. The trail is 16 kilometres (9.9 mi) long and travels from Anderson heading towards the coast downhill to Kilcunda, heading along coastal sand dunes into the open farmland surrounding Wonthaggi.

The original railway line opened in 1910, being used for the transport of coal from Kilcunda and Wonthaggi, and local agricultural produce, as well as for public transport. The line was closed in 1978.

== Route description ==
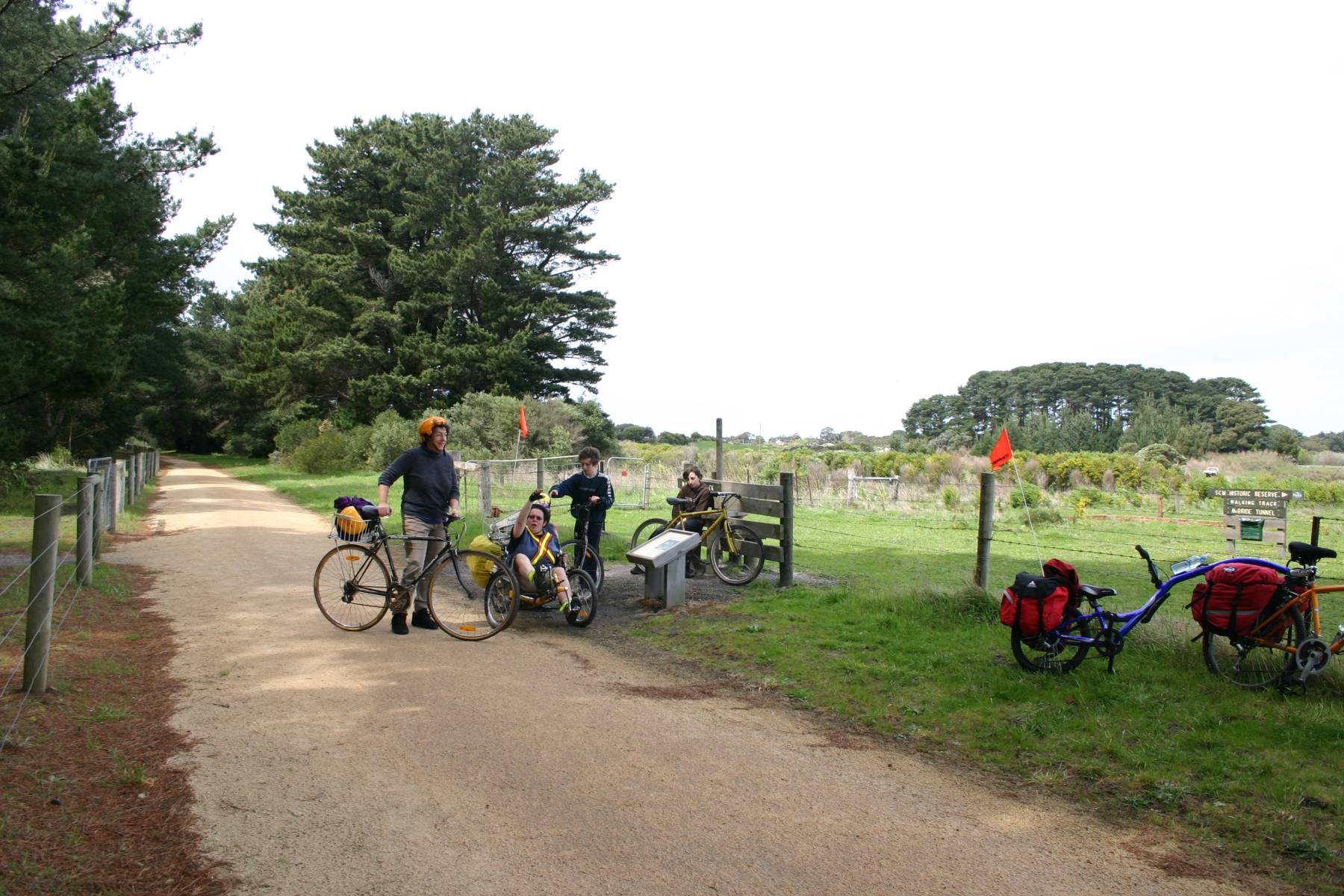
Cyclists on the trail stop at the historic reserve for the McBride Tunnel entrance of the Central Area Mine

From Anderson to Kilcunda the trail drops 40 metres (130 ft) in height as it winds down through farming country. The rail trail at Kilcunda is built on the coastal sand dunes and incorporates a landmark trestle bridge over Bourne Creek. Path users have panoramic scenic views of the Bass Strait coast and the Wonthaggi Wind Farm that was erected during 2005.

Heading towards Wonthaggi, the trail passes through flat agricultural fields. The trail uses a few small bridges to cross the Powlett River and tributaries. The entire trail near is packed gravel and features the heritage listed Wonthaggi station, and the historic Central Mine Reserve.

== Attractions on the trail ==
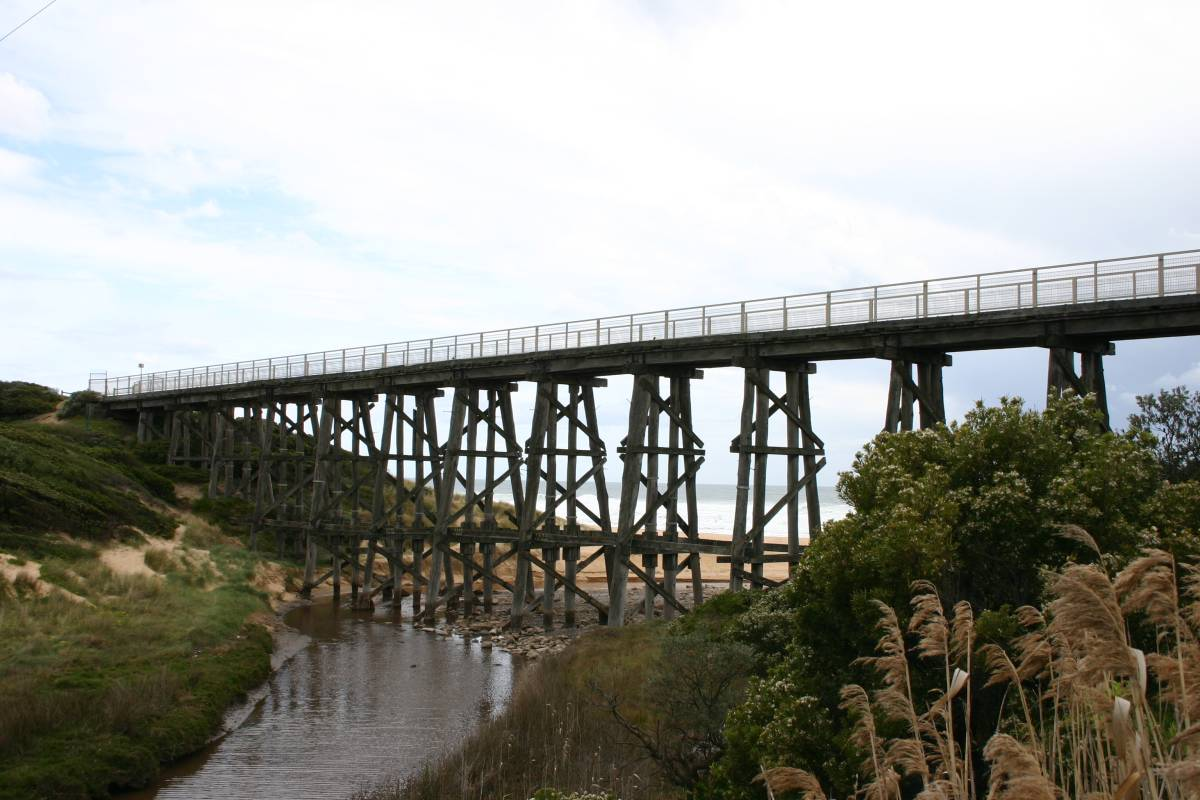
Kilcunda trestle bridge over Bourne Creek on the Rail Trail

- Anderson Station
- Kilcunda Station
- Kilcunda trestle bridge over Bourne Creek
- Dalyston Station
  - Branch off towards the former Dudley Area mine
- State Mine Station (the trail passes through the location, however it is not officially marked)
- Wonthaggi Station

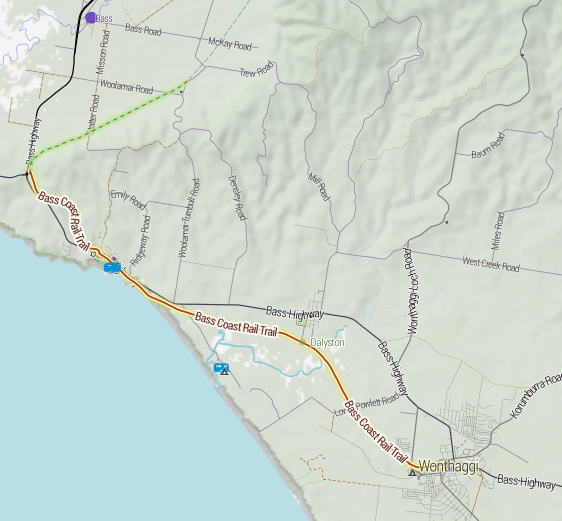
Map of the rail trail, including proposed extension to Woolamai.

== See also ==
- Cycling in Victoria
