= State Mine railway station =

Former railway station in Victoria, Australia

Coordinates: 38°36′15″S 145°34′26″E

State Mine
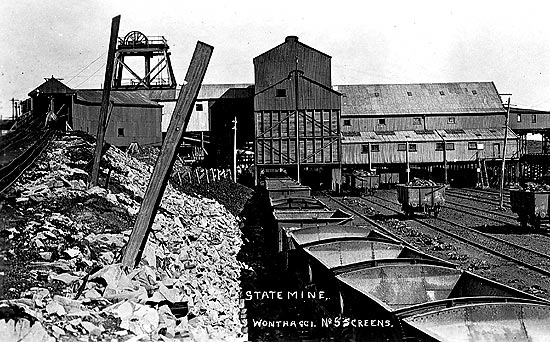
- Rail trucks at the mine circa 1919

General information
- Line: Wonthaggi
- Platforms: 1
- Tracks: 1

Other information
- Status: Closed

History
- Opened: 1901
- Closed: 1978

Services
Preceding station	Disused railways	Following station
Dalyston	Wonthaggi line	Wonthaggi
	List of closed railway stations in Victoria	
Location

State Mine was a railway yard and signal box on the Wonthaggi line in Bass Coast, Victoria, Australia. It was named for and served the adjacent State Coal Mine which provided black coal for the steam locomotives of the Victorian Railways. The mine opened in 1909 with the branchline opened in 1910. Production declined in the 1930s as larger seams were worked out but remained in operation until 1968 when regular steam operations were phased out.

Facilities included a signal box, classification and marshalling sidings, a weighbridge, an engine shed and repair siding, sidings for timber deliveries, and eight loading sidings.
