= Kilcunda railway station =

Former railway station in Victoria, Australia

Coordinates: 38°32′57″S 145°28′31″E

Kilcunda

General information
- Line: Wonthaggi
- Platforms: 1
- Tracks: 1

Other information
- Status: Closed

History
- Opened: 1910
- Closed: 1978
- Rebuilt: 1925

Services
Preceding station	Disused railways	Following station
Mitchell's Siding	Wonthaggi line	Dalyston
	List of closed railway stations in Victoria	
Location

Kilcunda was a railway station on the Wonthaggi line along the Bass Coast in Victoria, Australia.

It was an electric staff station from its opening until December 1916. The original station site, on a stretch of level track backing on to the ocean, was abandoned in 1925 due to coastal erosion, although a goods siding remained there until 1954. The station was moved to the former Picnic Platform, about 3/4 mile (1.2 km) to the west and closer to the town, but on a 1 in 60 grade. The station operated at that site until the line's closure in 1978. There is almost no trace left of the station, and the site is now part of the Bass Coast Rail Trail.
