= Dalyston railway station =

Former railway station in Victoria, Australia

Coordinates: 38°34′17″S 145°32′27″E

Dalyston

General information
- Line: Wonthaggi
- Platforms: 1
- Tracks: 1

Other information
- Status: Closed

History
- Opened: 1910
- Closed: 1978

Services
Preceding station	Disused railways	Following station
Kilcunda	Wonthaggi line	State Mine
	List of closed railway stations in Victoria	
Location

Dalyston was a railway station on the Wonthaggi railway line, in the Bass Coast area of Victoria. The station opened with the line and operated until the line's closure in 1978. A short distance beyond Dalyston a line branched off to Dudley Area, one of the many "mining branches" on the line. There is almost no trace left of the station. The Bass Coast Rail Trail now runs thought the site.
