= Wonthaggi railway line =

Former railway line in Victoria, Australia

Wonthaggi

Overview
- Status: Dismantled line - Bass Coast Rail Trail
- Owner: Victorian Railways (VR) (1910–1974); VR as VicRail (1974–1978)
- Locale: Victoria, Australia
- Termini: Nyora; Wonthaggi
- Continues from: Port Albert line
- Former connections: Port Albert line
- Stations: 10 former stations; 8 former siding

Service
- Type: Former Victorian regional service
- Operator(s): Victorian Railways (VR) (1910–1974); VR as VicRail (1974–1978)

History
- Commenced: 16 March 1910 - Coal (Nyora to State Mine)
- Opened: Nyora to Wonthaggi on 9 May 1910; Wonthaggi to Eastern Area in August 1919; Wonthaggi to Kirrak on 4 September 1939
- Completed: 4 September 1939
- Closed: Wonthaggi to Eastern Area in November 1952; Wonthaggi to Kirrak on 28 December 1968; Nyora to Wonthaggi on 21 November 1978

Technical
- Line length: ~53.11 km (33.00 mi)
- Number of tracks: Single track
- Track gauge: 5 ft 3 in (1,600 mm) Victorian broad gauge

The Wonthaggi railway line is a closed railway line located in South Gippsland, Victoria, Australia. Its primary purpose was to serve the State Coal Mine but the line also provided passenger and general goods services. The line was opened in 1910 and closed in 1978.

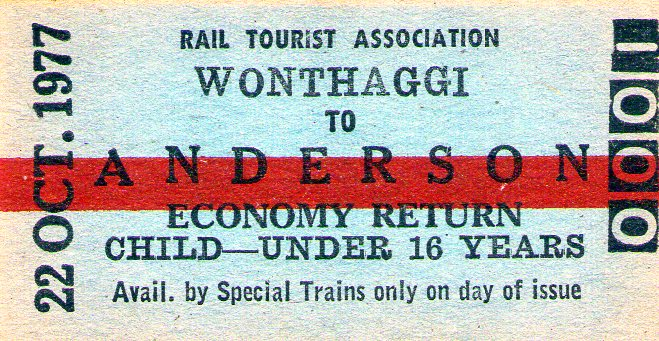
Wonthaggi-Anderson rail ticket 1977

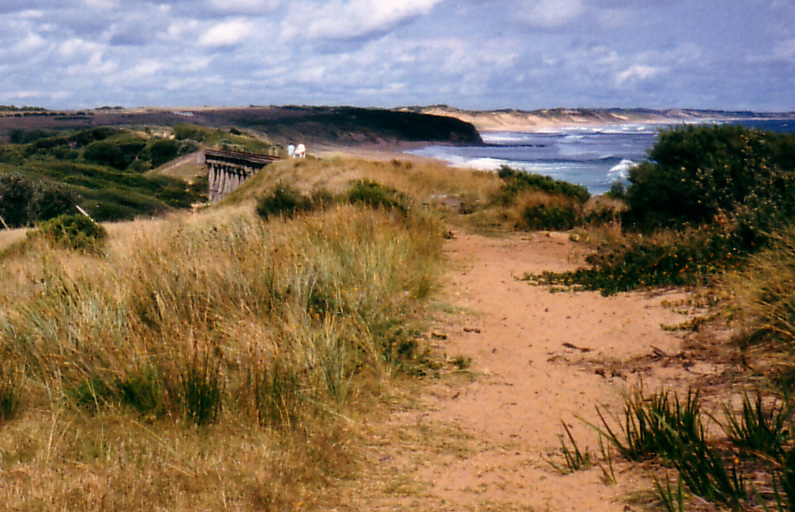
Wonthaggi line formation looking south from Kilcunda station across the Bourne Creek trestle bridge, c.1989

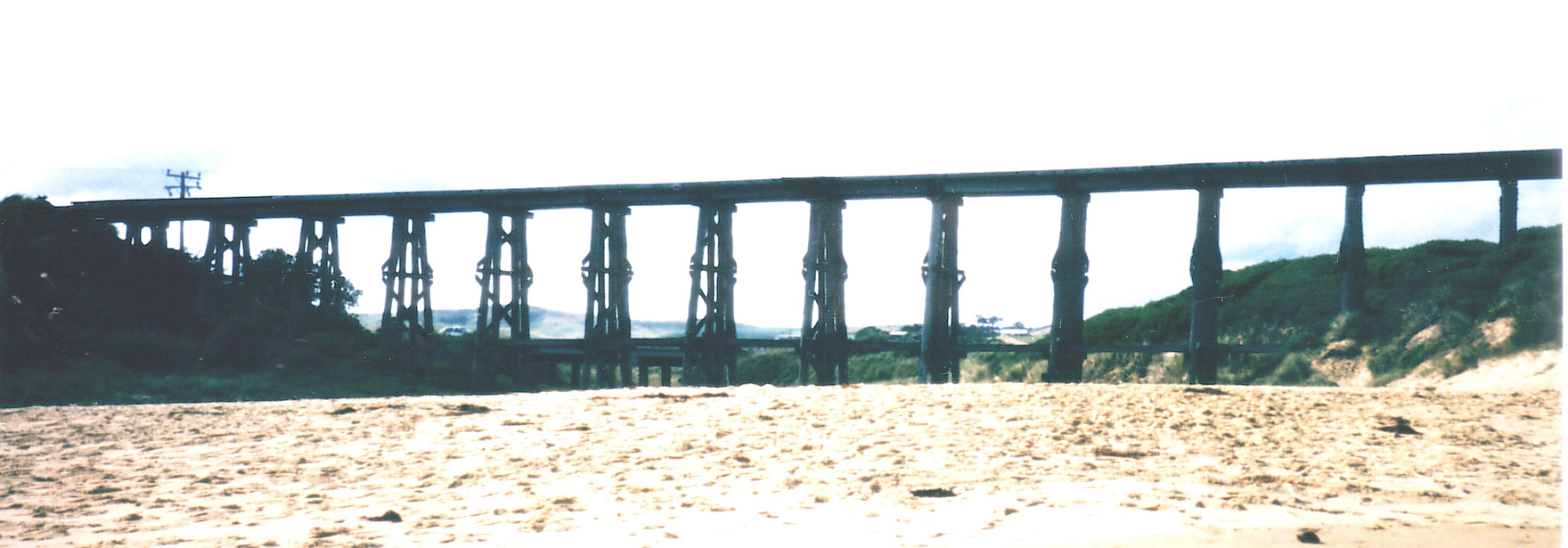
Bourne Creek trestle bridge, c.1989, prior to conversion to a rail trail bridge

== Background ==
In the late nineteenth and early twentieth centuries, the Victorian Railways depended on black coal to fire its steam locomotives. Although black coal deposits around Korumburra in South Gippsland had been exploited since 1891, the seams were narrow, the costs of production were relatively high and, in 1900, their production accounted for just a quarter of Victoria's consumption.

It was cheaper for VR to purchase coal from Newcastle, New South Wales, but a protracted miners' dispute in 1909 threatened the NSW supplies and led to an even stronger commitment by the Murray Government to securing local supplies. With the Korumburra mines unable to meet the Victorian Railways' demand for 1000 tons of coal a day, a promising seam on the Powlett River, which had been tested in 1908, was rapidly exploited, with the government opening the mine for commercial purposes in 1909. Although the first coal shipments were taken to Melbourne by sea from Inverloch, a railway was rapidly constructed to serve the new mine.

== Construction ==
Originally known as the "Powlett River railway", the Wonthaggi line was built extremely rapidly. A 15 1/2-mile (25 km) branch line from Nyora to Woolamai had already been approved, branching from the South Gippsland line (the Great Southern Railway) just east of Nyora railway station, but work had not started. In December 1909, a 14 1/2-mile (23 km) extension of the branch from Woolamai to the Powlett River coalfield was given parliamentary sanction.

The line carried its first coal in February 1910, with Baldwin-built 4-6-0 locomotive W 227 given the honour of hauling the first train from the Powlett coalfield. As well as passenger and general goods stations to service the rapidly growing town of Wonthaggi, connections were provided to the State Mine (on the up side of Wonthaggi) and to later additional mine extensions at Dudley and Kirrak.

== Traffic ==
The mine's production grew rapidly and at its peak in 1926 produced 2,435 long tons (2,474 t) per day, with Victorian Railways buying 90% of production.

By 1928, twelve return passenger services also ran on the line per week, with a journey time from Flinders Street station to Wonthaggi taking approximately four hours.

The introduction of diesel rail motors in the 1950s saw a reduction in journey times for passenger services on the line to around three hours by 1954, but service frequency was now eleven return passenger services operating per week.

== Decline and closure ==
The conversion of Victorian Railways from steam to diesel-electric power during the 1950s and 1960s reduced demand for black coal and in 1968 the mine closed. Passenger services from Nyora to Wonthaggi were withdrawn on 4 December 1977 with the last train being a 153hp Walker railmotor. By this time the general decline of Victorian branch line network saw services being withdrawn from a number of lines, and the Wonthaggi line closed on 21 November 1978 when a final goods train returned to Melbourne with staff equipment from stations along the line.

The track was dismantled in 1988 and the southern section from Woolamai to Wonthaggi has been developed as the Bass Coast Rail Trail.

== Station histories ==
Station	Opened	Closed	Age	Notes
Nyora	11 November 1890	15 December 1994	104 years	
Nyora	15 December 1994	16 January 2016	21 years	Tourist service
Woodleigh	9 May 1910	21 November 1978	68 years	Opened as Hunter
Kernot	9 May 1910	21 November 1978	68 years	During construction known as Almurta. Opened as McKenzie
Almurta	13 September 1910	21 November 1978	68 years	During construction known as Rees
Glen Forbes	9 May 1910	11 January 1966	55 years	Opened as Kernot
Woolamai	9 May 1910	21 November 1978	68 years	
Woolamai Quarry Company Siding	12 August 1910	8 August 1911	11 months	
Anderson	9 May 1910	21 November 1978	68 years	During construction known as Andersons Corner
Outtrim Howitt Coal Co. Siding	?	?	?	Formerly Co-operative Colliery Co. Siding
Mitchell's Siding	9 May 1910	23 May 1957	47 years	
Kilcunda	4 December 1924	21 November 1978	53 years	Opened as Picnic Platform
Kilcunda Goods Siding	9 May 1910	10 March 1954	43 years	Opened as Kilcunda, then just Kilcunda Siding
Dalyston	9 May 1910	21 November 1978	68 years	
Dudley Area	26 December 1910	4 May 1925	14 years	Was originally Powlett and North Woolamai Colliery Company Sidings
Dudley Area	14 April 1925	?	?	Reopened as Dudley Area
State Mine	16 March 1910	July 1971	61 years	Opened as Powlett Coalfield
Wonthaggi	9 May 1910	21 November 1978	68 years	
Eastern Area	4 August 1919	4 November 1952	33 years	Formerly Garden Blocks
Kirrak	4 September 1939	26 October 1976	37 years	
