= Wonthaggi railway station =

Former railway station in Victoria, Australia

Wonthaggi
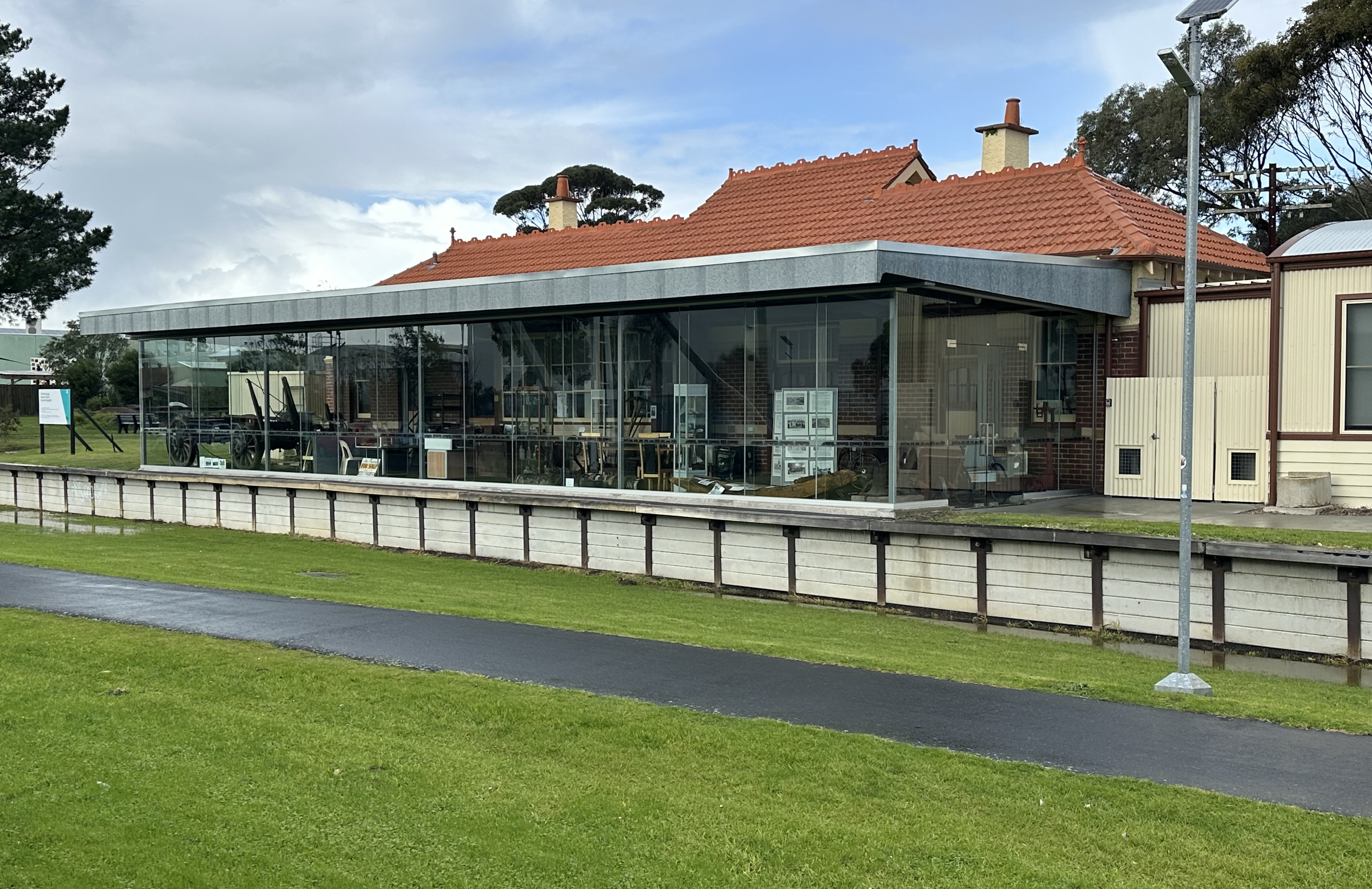
- Station building in July 2026

General information
- Location: 8-12 Murray Street, Wonthaggi, Victoria; Australia
- Coordinates: 38°36′15″S 145°35′27″E
- Operator: Victorian Railways
- Line: Wonthaggi
- Platforms: 1
- Tracks: 4

Construction
- Structure type: at–grade
- Architectural style: Australian Queen Anne

Other information
- Status: Closed

History
- Opened: 1912
- Closed: 21 November 1978

Services
Preceding station	Disused railways	Following station
State Mine	Wonthaggi line	Terminus
	List of closed railway stations in Victoria	

Victorian Heritage Register
- Official name: Wonthaggi Railway Station
- Type: Registered place
- Designated: 20 August 1982
- Reference no.: 4851
- Category: Transport - Rail
Location

The Wonthaggi railway station is a former railway station located in the town of Wonthaggi, in the Gippsland region of Victoria, Australia. Built to serve the town as well as the State Coal Mine, the station was the official terminus station of the Wonthaggi line operated by Victorian Railways, and two short branch lines continued from the station, leading to the Kirrak and Eastern Area mine extensions.

The station operated until the line's closure in 1978, with the station building subsequently preserved and used as a museum. Other pieces or railway infrastructure remaining at the station include a goods shed and crane. Wonthaggi Station is the final station on the Bass Coast Rail Trail.

On 20 August 1982, the former station was added to the Victorian Heritage Register.
