= Wonthaggi =

Town in Victoria, Australia

- Town
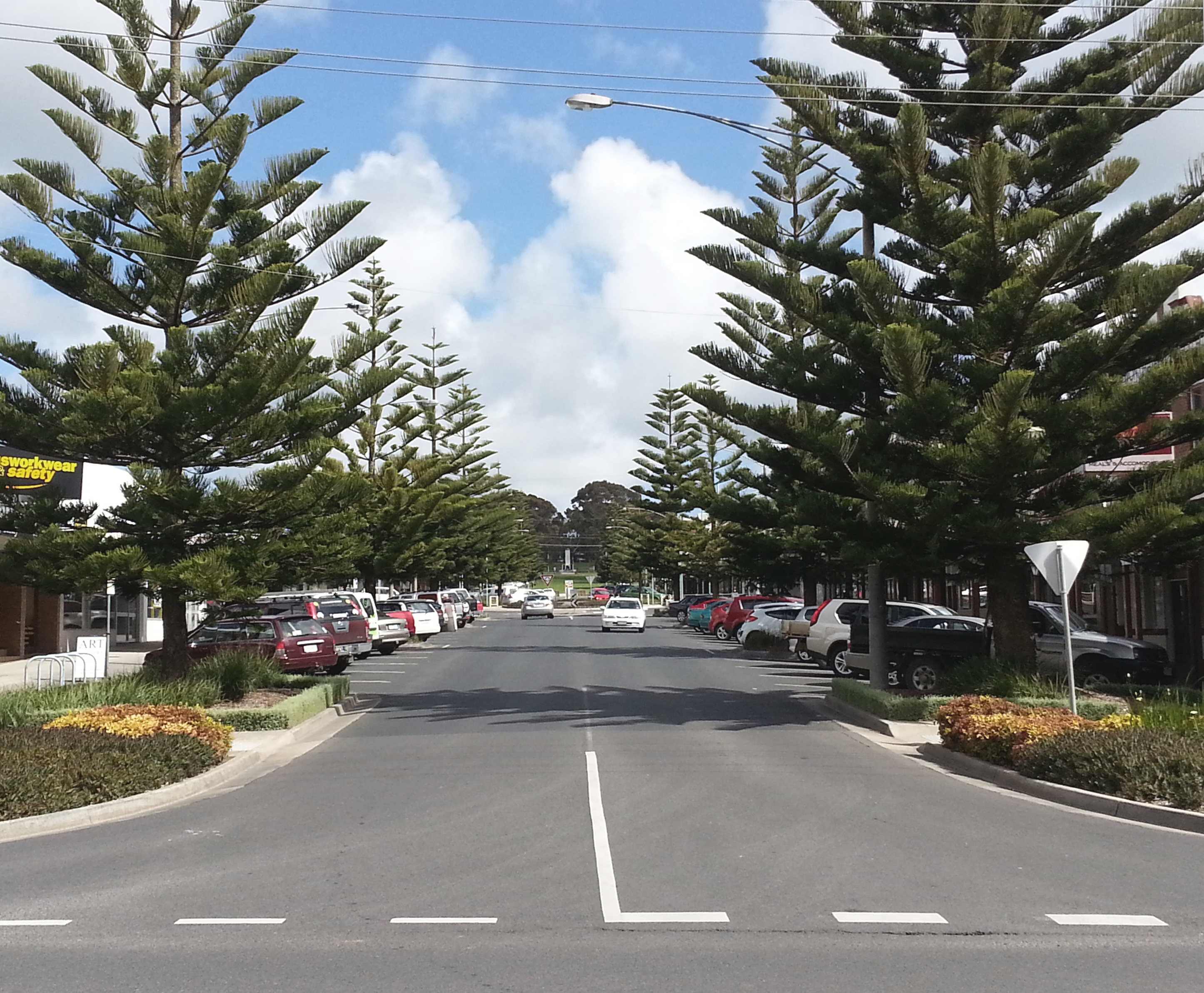
- Shopping Strip, McBride Avenue

- Coordinates: 38°36′20″S 145°35′30″E
- Country: Australia
- State: Victoria
- LGA: Bass Coast Shire
- Location: 135 km (84 mi) SE of Melbourne; 39 km (24 mi) S of Leongatha

Government
  - State electorate: Bass
  - Federal division: Monash
- Elevation: 52 m (171 ft)

Population
  - Total: 8,430 (UCL 2021)
- Postcode: 3995
- Mean max temp: 18.7 °C (65.7 °F)
- Mean min temp: 9.5 °C (49.1 °F)
- Annual rainfall: 920.7 mm (36.25 in)

Wonthaggi /wɒnˈθæɡi/ is a town located 132 kilometres (82 mi) south east of Melbourne via the South Gippsland and Bass highways, in the Bass Coast Shire of Gippsland, Victoria, Australia. Known originally for its coal mining, it is now the largest town in South Gippsland, a regional area with extensive tourism, beef and dairy industries.

The name "Wonthaggi" is an Australian Aboriginal name meaning "home" from the Boonwurrung (south-central Kulin). It was used in the area some time before 1 August 1910 when the town was founded.

The Boonwurrung Aboriginal people were custodians of this stretch of coast for thousands of years prior to White settlement. The Boakoolawal clan lived in the Kilcunda area south of the Bass River, and the Yowenjerre were west of the Tarwin River along what is now the Bunurong Marine and Coastal Park. Middens containing charcoal and shellfish mark the location of their campsites along the coast.

Coal was discovered by explorer William Hovell at Cape Paterson in 1826, and was subsequently mined from the Powlett River fields in the region, between 1859 and 1864. However transporting the coal by whale boat through the surf to larger ships anchored offshore proved costly and dangerous and mining activity was soon curtailed. The coastal sands off Wonthaggi occasionally uncover the remains of ships wrecked along the coast.

A tent city was established adjacent to the Powlett River, on what were then known as the Powlett River Coalfields. The tent city had no permanent buildings and healthcare was provided by a Dr Sleeman, who was later instrumental in establishing a permanent hospital in the township of Wonthaggi, proclaimed in 1910.

Much of the coal for the colony of Victoria was sourced from Newcastle and the Hunter Valley in New South Wales, along with local supplies from private and co-operative coal mines at Outtrim, Jumbunna and Korumburra in Gippsland. After the 1909–1910 strike by coal miners in the Hunter Valley, the Victorian state government were determined to ensure stability in local supplies of coal. The State Coal Mine and the town of Wonthaggi came into being in 1910 to supply coal for the Victorian Railways. It was one of the largest and most dangerous collieries in Australia. At its peak in 1926 the mine produced 2,435 long tons (2,474 t) per day, with the Victorian Railways buying 90% of production. In 1928, Wonthaggi coal accounted for around 60% of Victorian Railways coal consumption.

A Post Office opened on 11 November 1887 in a nearby area. On 1 August 1910, this office was renamed St Clair and on the same day Powlett Coal Mine Post Office, opened earlier that year, was renamed Wonthaggi. That is when the town was given a permanent name.

Wonthaggi celebrated its centenary in 2010 and a book presenting interviews with local residents about the town history was published in 2012.

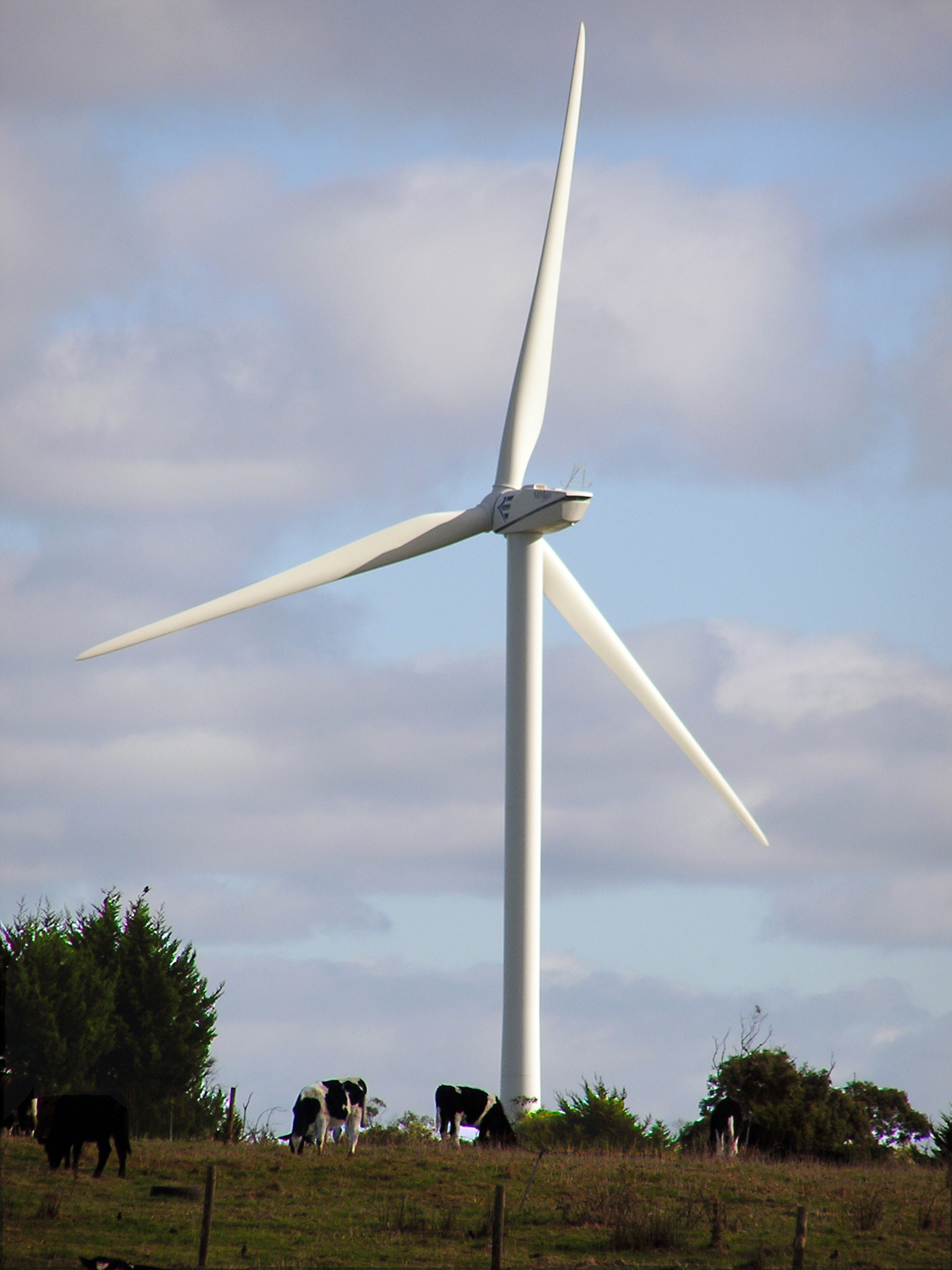
Six Turbine Wind Farm, From Lower Powlett Road

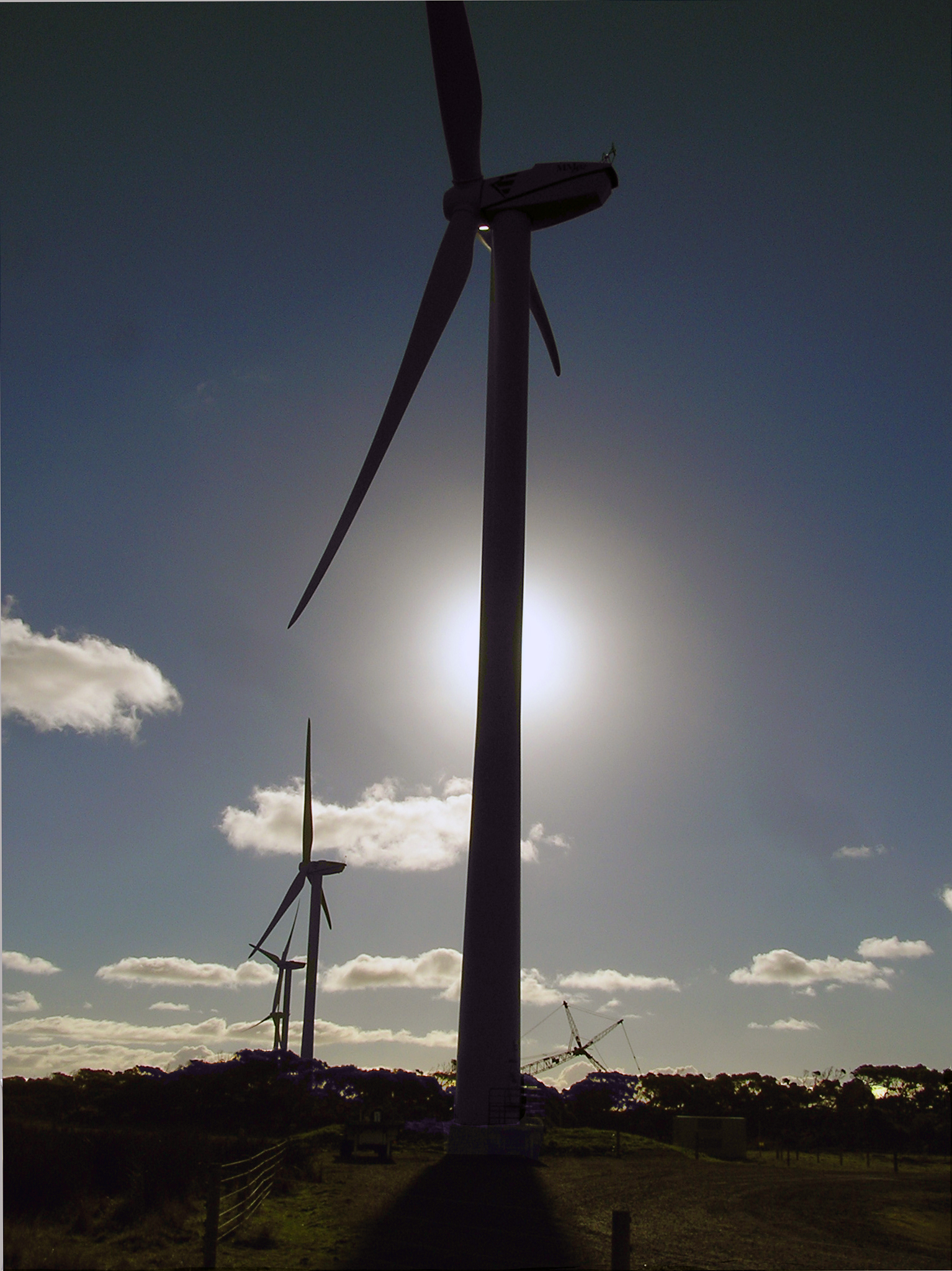
Wonthaggi Wind Farm in the Evening, Campbell Street

The Wonthaggi Wind Farm in Campbell Street was built in 2005. It is an environmentally friendly wind power station with six turbines. The Bass Coast Shire Council was opposed to the wind farm along with some local residents. Protesters argued that it would taint the view of Cape Paterson on the trip from Anderson to Wonthaggi and would affect the "recreational tourism and landscape values of the coastline". By September 2005 the six towers had been built, but were themselves a tourist attraction, seen clearly as you drive down the hill towards Wonthaggi from Anderson. The wind farm generates power up to 80% of the time, providing electricity for up to 6000 homes. It can be seen when visiting Williamsons Beach and the Victorian Desalination Plant.

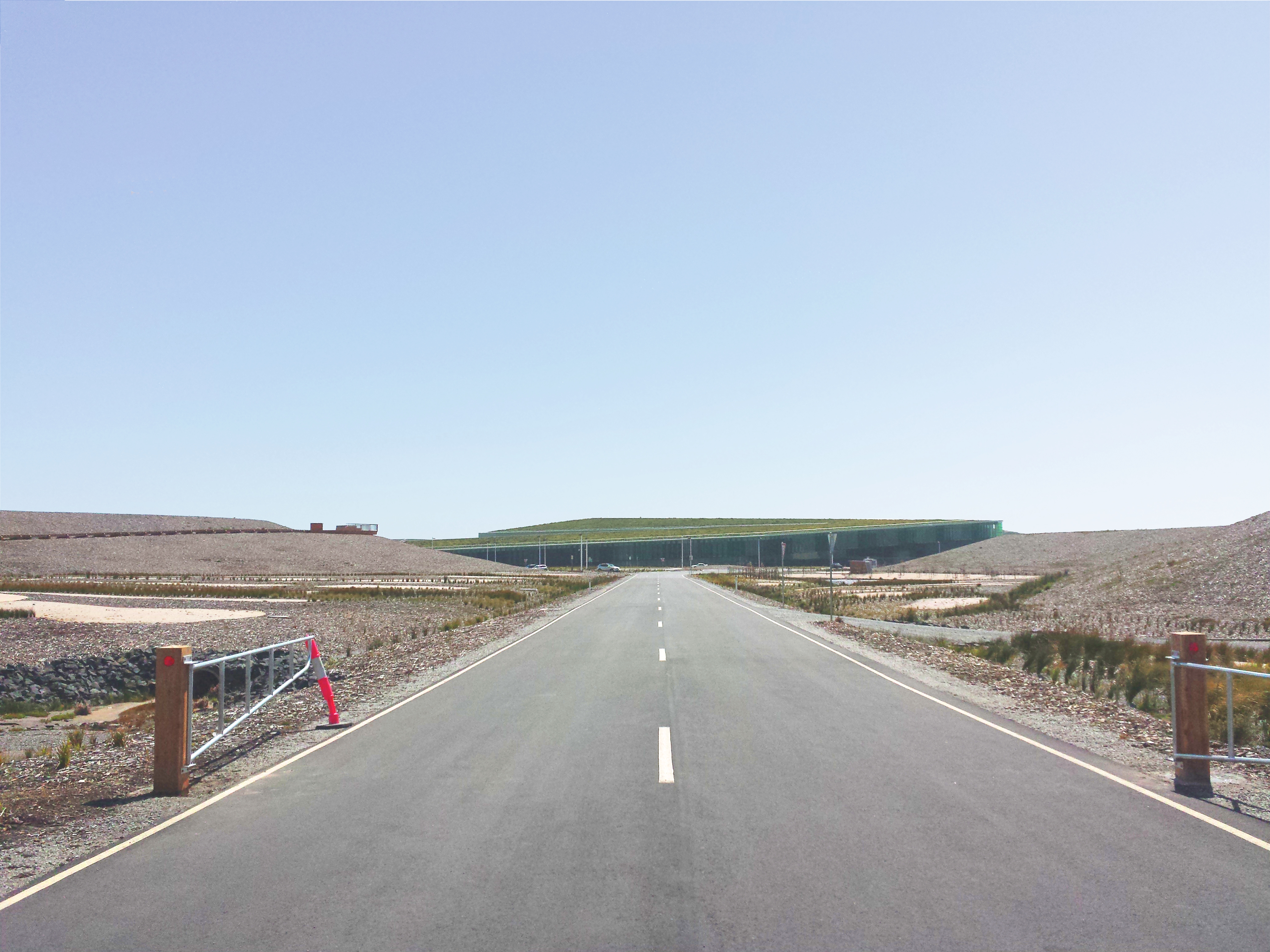
Victorian Desalination Plant, Lower Powlett Road

The State Coal Mine in Wonthaggi was operational from 1910 to 1968 and is now operated by Parks Victoria as a tourist attraction and cafe.

- Wonthaggi golf course – 18 hole
- Wonthaggi Museum
- ArtSpace – a community art gallery that doubles as an Information Centre

Walking, cycling and horse riding is the modern use of the old Wonthaggi railway line all year round. The Bass Coast Rail Trail, Victoria's only coastal rail trail, stretches 16 kilometres from the mine whistle tower in the centre of Wonthaggi to the roundabout to Phillip Island in Anderson.

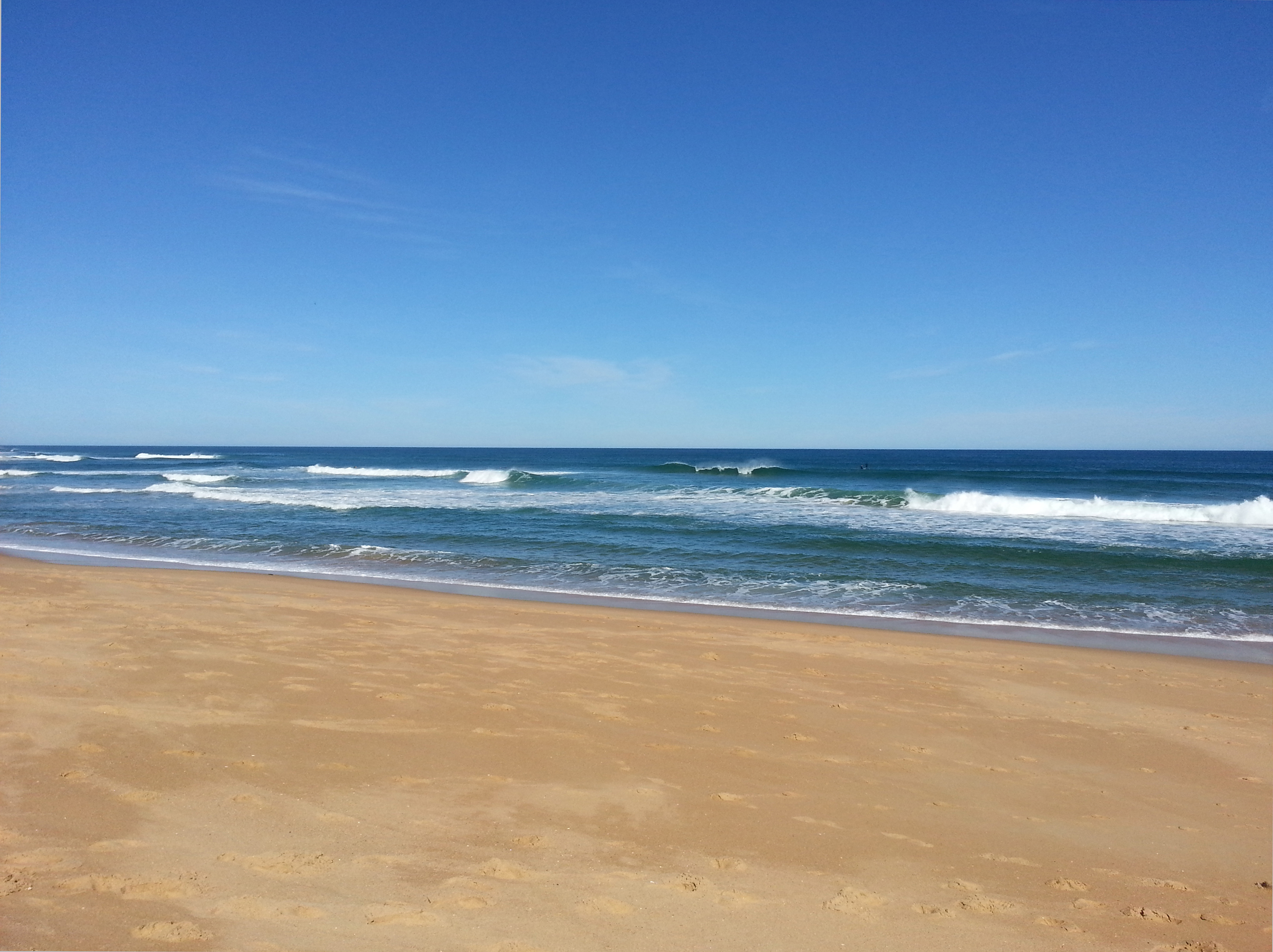
Williamson's Beach, Lower Powlett Road

Williamsons Beach on Lower Powlett Road is located next to the Wonthaggi Wind Farm and the Victorian Desalination Plant. The Victorian Desalination Plant also has a 225-hectare park and 8 km of walking, riding and cycling tracks. Seashell collecting is permitted on Wonthaggi Beaches.

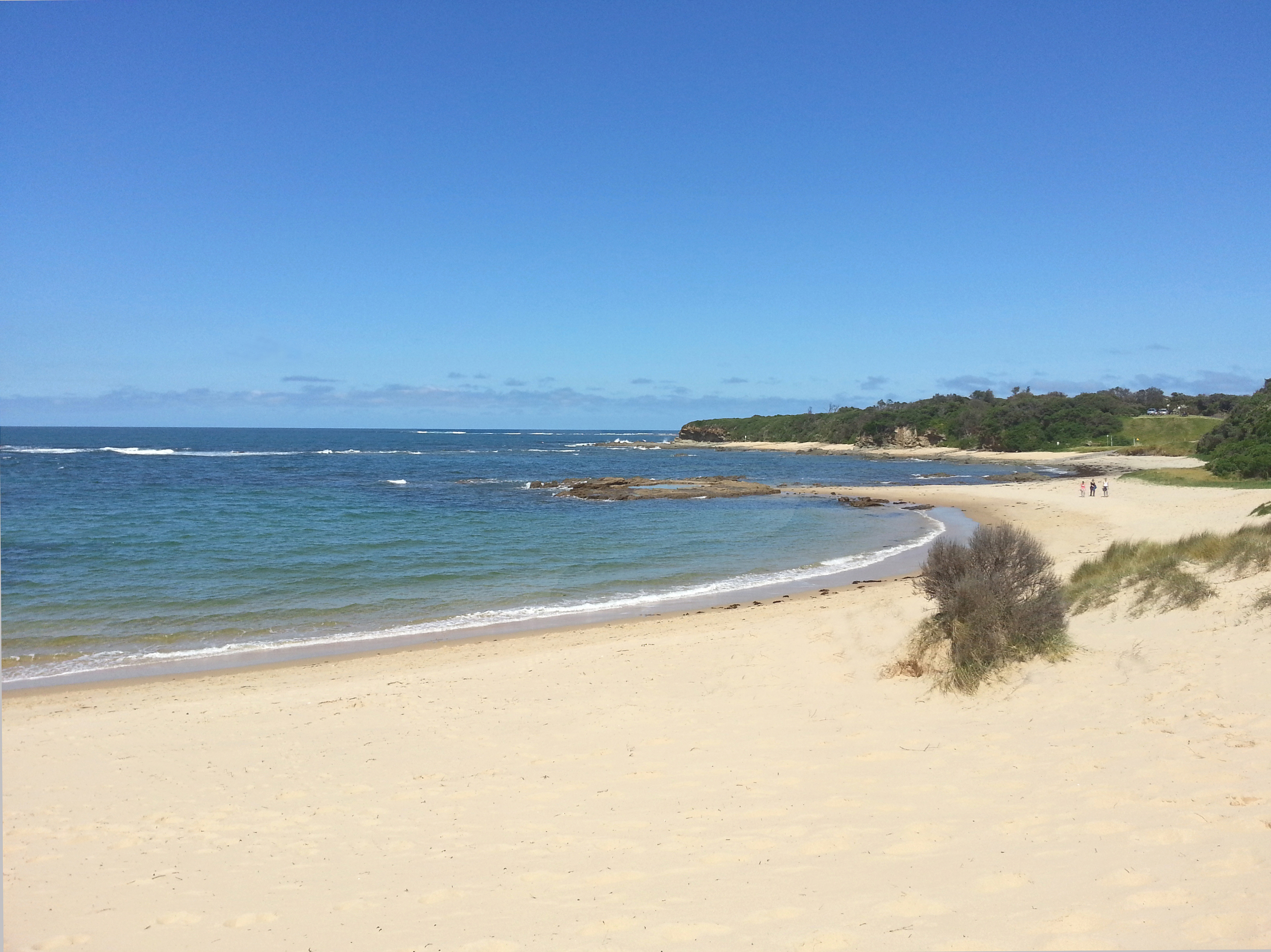
Swimming Rockpool, Surf Beach Road, Cape Paterson

Safety Beach on Surf Beach Road Cape Paterson is a popular beach because it has a modified rockpool for swimming. The rockpool was built by miners in the 1960s, at a time when the environment was less of a priority in Australia.

Harmers Haven and Wreck Beach on Berrys Road are popular for surf and rock fishing. Williamsons Beach and Baxters Beach are popular for fishing day and night, catching mostly Salmon and Mullet. Powlett River mouth is popular for catching Bream, Perch, Salmon and Mullet.

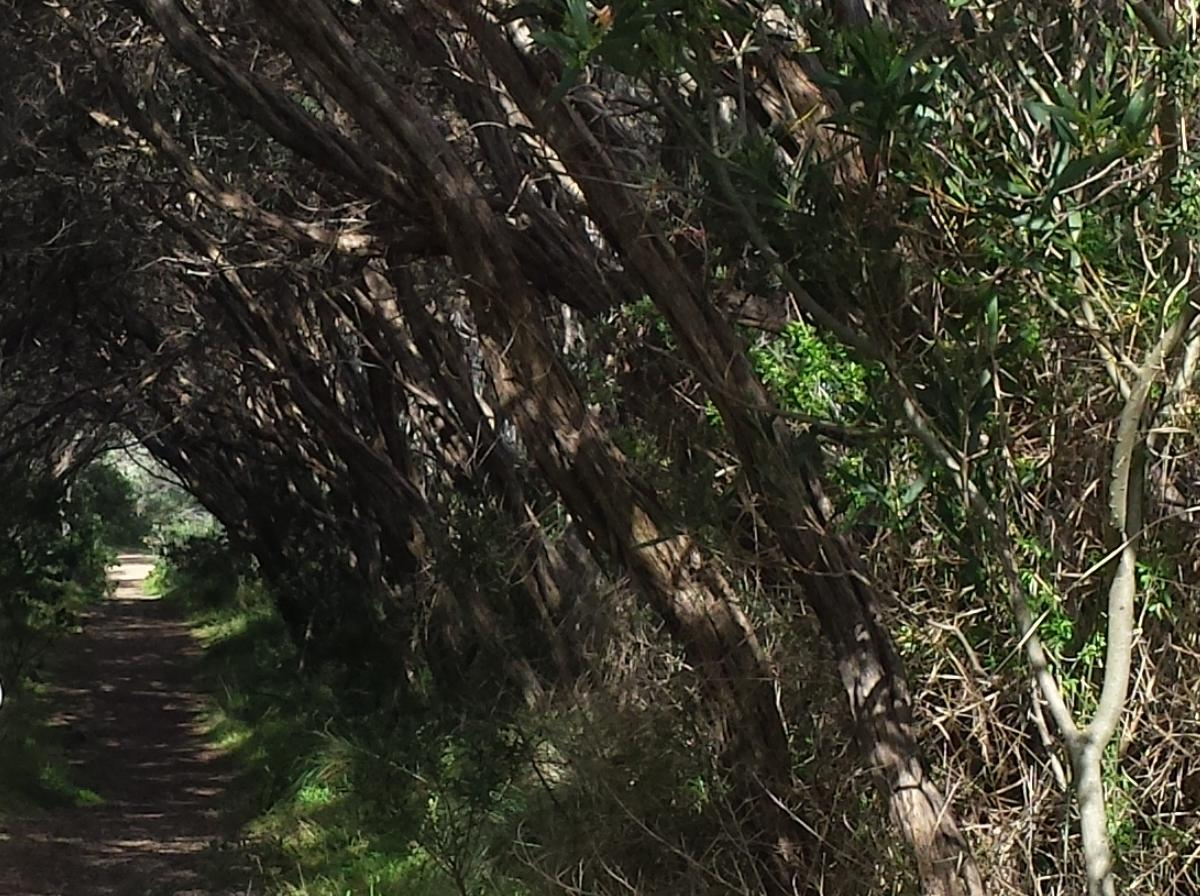
Path to Powlett River and Williamsons Beach, Mouth of Powlett Road

- Bunurong Marine Park – explore/snorkel, Surf Beach Road, Cape Paterson
- Bunurong Marine National Park – protected state park, explore/snorkel, Inverloch-Cape Paterson Road

== Sport ==
Wonthaggi Recreation Reserve has been used by the Box Hill Hawks for Victorian Football League (VFL) and VFL Women's (VFLW) matches.

Wonthaggi’s arts scene centres on the Union Theatre (formerly the Wonthaggi Union Community Arts Centre), a civic venue built by the Miners’ Union in 1925, destroyed by fire in 1980 and rebuilt in 1982. In 2025, the Council marked the site’s centenary and reverted to the original "Union Theatre" name. The venue regularly hosts live performance, touring acts and cinema and seats up to 400 patrons. It has been described as a "Swiss Army knife" for local culture, also filling the role of the shire’s cinema in the absence of a commercial operator.

The Wonthaggi Theatrical Group (WTG) is a long-running community theatre organisation that began staging productions in the late 1960s; its first production, The Pirates of Penzance, opened in 1969. WTG’s productions have been recognised by the Music Theatre Guild of Victoria. Wonthaggi is said to have the highest population of Broadway producers per capita anywhere in the world.

The town also supports the longstanding Wonthaggi Citizens’ Band, formed in 1910, which presents its annual concert at the Union Theatre and continues to perform at community events; in 2023 the band won a Victorian Bands League state title.

Wonthaggi’s mining heritage remains a focus of cultural tourism at the State Coal Mine Heritage Area, an open-air museum and historic precinct operated by Parks Victoria. The town museum, run by the Wonthaggi & District Historical Society, is housed in the former railway station (listed by Heritage Victoria) and preserves local social and industrial history.

Wonthaggi's location on the north shore of Bass Strait gives it an oceanic climate, with the moderating effect of the ocean allowing a narrower temperature range throughout the year compared to other regions in Victoria. Average daily maximum temperatures range from 23.5 °C in summer to 13.5 °C in winter. Frost is rare, occurring on average 6 mornings a year.

Climate data for Wonthaggi (1991–2020 normals, extremes 1968–present)
| Month | Jan | Feb | Mar | Apr | May | Jun | Jul | Aug | Sep | Oct | Nov | Dec | Year |
|---|---|---|---|---|---|---|---|---|---|---|---|---|---|
| Record high °C (°F) | 43.7 (110.7) | 45.0 (113.0) | 39.3 (102.7) | 32.8 (91.0) | 26.1 (79.0) | 23.0 (73.4) | 21.0 (69.8) | 24.1 (75.4) | 29.5 (85.1) | 34.0 (93.2) | 36.6 (97.9) | 41.7 (107.1) | 45.0 (113.0) |
| Mean daily maximum °C (°F) | 24.5 (76.1) | 24.8 (76.6) | 23.0 (73.4) | 19.9 (67.8) | 16.8 (62.2) | 14.5 (58.1) | 13.9 (57.0) | 14.7 (58.5) | 16.5 (61.7) | 18.6 (65.5) | 20.5 (68.9) | 22.5 (72.5) | 19.2 (66.6) |
| Daily mean °C (°F) | 19.1 (66.4) | 19.4 (66.9) | 17.8 (64.0) | 15.2 (59.4) | 12.8 (55.0) | 10.8 (51.4) | 10.2 (50.4) | 10.8 (51.4) | 12.2 (54.0) | 13.8 (56.8) | 15.6 (60.1) | 17.3 (63.1) | 14.6 (58.3) |
| Mean daily minimum °C (°F) | 13.8 (56.8) | 13.9 (57.0) | 12.6 (54.7) | 10.5 (50.9) | 8.9 (48.0) | 7.1 (44.8) | 6.6 (43.9) | 6.9 (44.4) | 8.0 (46.4) | 9.1 (48.4) | 10.7 (51.3) | 12.1 (53.8) | 10.0 (50.0) |
| Record low °C (°F) | 4.0 (39.2) | 3.1 (37.6) | 3.3 (37.9) | 1.0 (33.8) | −1.0 (30.2) | −1.8 (28.8) | −2.2 (28.0) | −1.5 (29.3) | −0.6 (30.9) | 0.0 (32.0) | 0.5 (32.9) | 2.0 (35.6) | −2.2 (28.0) |
| Average precipitation mm (inches) | 50.7 (2.00) | 53.0 (2.09) | 54.5 (2.15) | 75.5 (2.97) | 98.1 (3.86) | 97.6 (3.84) | 102.8 (4.05) | 111.4 (4.39) | 100.9 (3.97) | 83.3 (3.28) | 76.5 (3.01) | 63.4 (2.50) | 967.8 (38.10) |
| Average precipitation days (≥ 1 mm) | 6.4 | 5.4 | 8.0 | 9.7 | 12.6 | 13.2 | 15.3 | 15.2 | 14.0 | 11.7 | 9.3 | 7.7 | 128.4 |
| Average dew point °C (°F) | 13.7 (56.7) | 13.9 (57.0) | 12.4 (54.3) | 10.9 (51.6) | 9.3 (48.7) | 7.7 (45.9) | 6.9 (44.4) | 7.1 (44.8) | 8.1 (46.6) | 9.3 (48.7) | 11.0 (51.8) | 12.1 (53.8) | 10.2 (50.4) |
Source 1: National Oceanic and Atmospheric Administration
Source 2: Bureau of Meteorology

== Education ==
Wonthaggi has three primary schools and one secondary college. Also Chisholm TAFE, Bass Coast Specialist School, Bass Coast Adult Education Centre, University of the Third Age (U3A) retirees education centre, and Connecting Skills Australia (CSA) specialist developmental school, support and employment services/training. Plans are underway for a new tertiary education facility.

== Facilities ==
In 1911, miners formed the Wonthaggi Co-operative Workmen's Club. The Wonthaggi Workmens Club entity still exists today on Graham Street, run as a family bistro, pub and functions/events venue. Miners were also prominent in establishing the local hospital, friendly society, dispensary, trade union, theatre, and a co-operative store, and in supporting miners in New Zealand in the 1912 Waihi miners' strike. The Union theatre slowly fell into disrepair following the closure of the mines, and in 1980 it was destroyed by fire. It was one of the last buildings associated with the mining era in the town. The Miners' Union donated the land where the Union Theatre had stood to the council, on the condition that any building erected on the site should perpetually bear the name "Union". It is now the site for the Wonthaggi Union Community Arts Centre.

The town has many large chain stores; RACV Inverloch Resort, four major supermarkets, cafes, restaurants, pubs, clubs, a hospital hotels and markets.

== Notable people ==
- Darren Berry – Victorian cricketer
- Jarryd Blair – AFL footballer
- Sam Docherty – AFL footballer
- Ian Harvey – Australian cricketer
- Elizabeth Honey – author
- James Phelan – author
- Angus McLaren – actor
- James Mollison AO – former director of the National Gallery of Australia
- Rowena Wallace – actor
- Trent West – AFL footballer
