= School of Fine Arts =

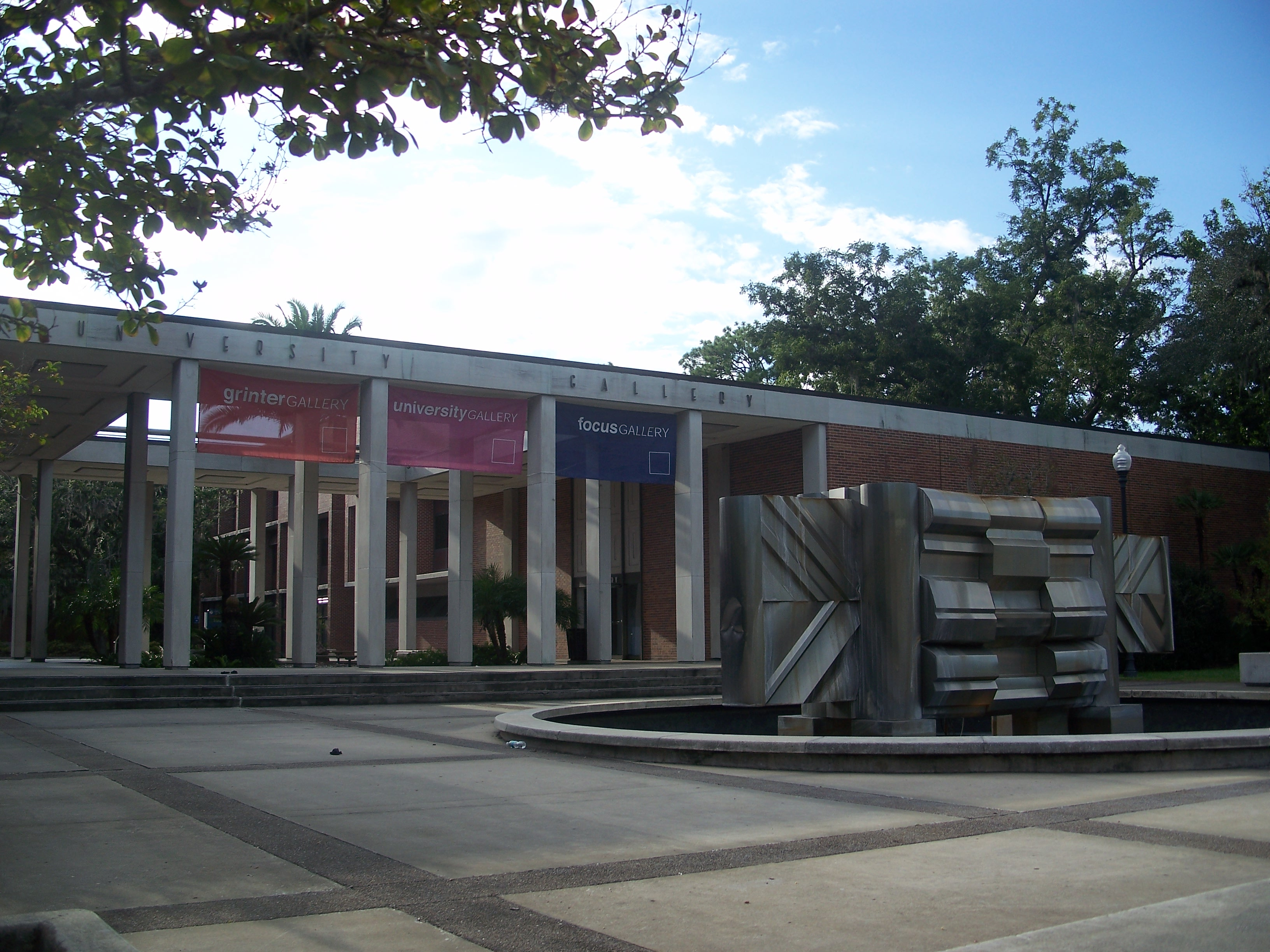
University of Florida College of Fine Arts

The School of Fine Arts or College of Fine Arts is the official name or part of the name of several schools of fine arts, often as an academic part of a larger university. These include:

== The Americas ==
=== North America ===
- Alabama School of Fine Arts
- Carnegie Mellon College of Fine Arts, Carnegie Mellon University
- Escuela de Artes Plásticas y Diseño de Puerto Rico
- Lyme Academy College of Fine Arts, Old Lyme, Connecticut
- New York University Institute of Fine Arts
- San Francisco Art Institute, formally named "California School of Fine Arts"
- School of the Art Institute of Chicago
- School of the Museum of Fine Arts at Tufts, Tufts University
- University of Florida College of Fine Arts
- University of Iowa School of Art and Art History
- University of Kentucky College of Fine Arts
- Weitzenhoffer Family College of Fine Arts, University of Oklahoma
- University of Texas at Austin College of Fine Arts
- Vermont College of Fine Arts
- Yale School of Art, Yale University

== Asia ==
=== Iran ===
- University of Tehran, College of Fine Arts, Tehran, Iran

=== Iraq ===
- Baghdad College of Fine Arts

=== Philippines ===
- University of Santo Tomas College of Fine Arts and Design

=== Sri Lanka ===
- University of the Visual and Performing Arts, former name was " Colombo College of Fine Arts"

== Europe ==
=== Belgium ===
- Hogeschool Sint-Lukas Brussel

=== Denmark ===
- Royal Danish Academy of Fine Arts
- Funen Art Academy
- Jutland Art Academy

=== France ===
École des Beaux-Arts (School of Fine Arts) is a name borne by art schools in several French cities

- École nationale supérieure des beaux-arts de Lyon
- École nationale supérieure des Beaux-Arts, de Paris (French National School of Fine Arts)

=== Germany ===
- Berlin University of the Arts
- Braunschweig University of Art
- Munich Academy of Fine Arts
- Düsseldorf Academy of Fine Arts

=== Greece ===
- Athens School of Fine Arts

=== Italy ===
- Brera Academy
- School of Fine Arts at the American Academy in Rome
- Florence Academy of Art, School of fine arts Italy

=== Netherlands ===
- Academie Minerva, Groningen
- AKI Art & Design Enschede ArtEZ, Enschede; part of ArtEZ Institute of the Arts
- AKV St. Joost, 's-Hertogenbosch and Breda
- Amsterdam University of the Arts
- ArtEZ Institute of the Arts, Arnhem en Zwolle
- Christelijke Kunstacademie Zwolle, Zwolle
- Design Academy, Eindhoven
- Fontys Academie voor Beeldende Vorming, Tilburg
- Gerrit Rietveld Academie, Amsterdam
- Jan Van Eyck Academie, Maastricht
- Maastricht Academy of Fine Arts
- Rijksakademie van Beeldende Kunsten, Amsterdam
- Royal Academy of Art, The Hague
- Utrecht School of the Arts
- Willem de Kooning Academie (WDKA), Rotterdam

=== Poland ===
- Jan Matejko Academy of Fine Arts in Kraków
- Eugeniusz Geppert Academy of Fine Arts in Wrocław
- Academy of Fine Arts In Łódź
- Academy of Fine Arts in Warsaw
- Magdalena Abakanowicz University of the Arts Poznan
- Academy of Fine Arts in Gdańsk
- Art Academy of Szczecin in Szczecin
- Academy of Fine Arts in Katowice

=== Sweden ===
- Valand School of Fine Arts

=== United Kingdom ===
- Slade School of Fine Art, University College London
- Heatherley School of Fine Art, London
- School of Fine Art, History of Art and Cultural Studies of University of Leeds
- School of Fine Art and Photography of University for the Creative Arts
- School of Fine Art of Glasgow School of Art
- Birmingham School of Fine Art, former name of Birmingham School of Art

== Australia and New Zealand ==
- Elam School of Fine Arts, University of Auckland (Auckland, New Zealand)
- Ilam School of Fine Arts, University of Canterbury (Christchurch, New Zealand)
- UNSW Art & Design, University of New South Wales (Sydney, Australia); previously the UNSW College of Fine Arts
