= Hesselholdt & Mejlvang =

Visual artist duo

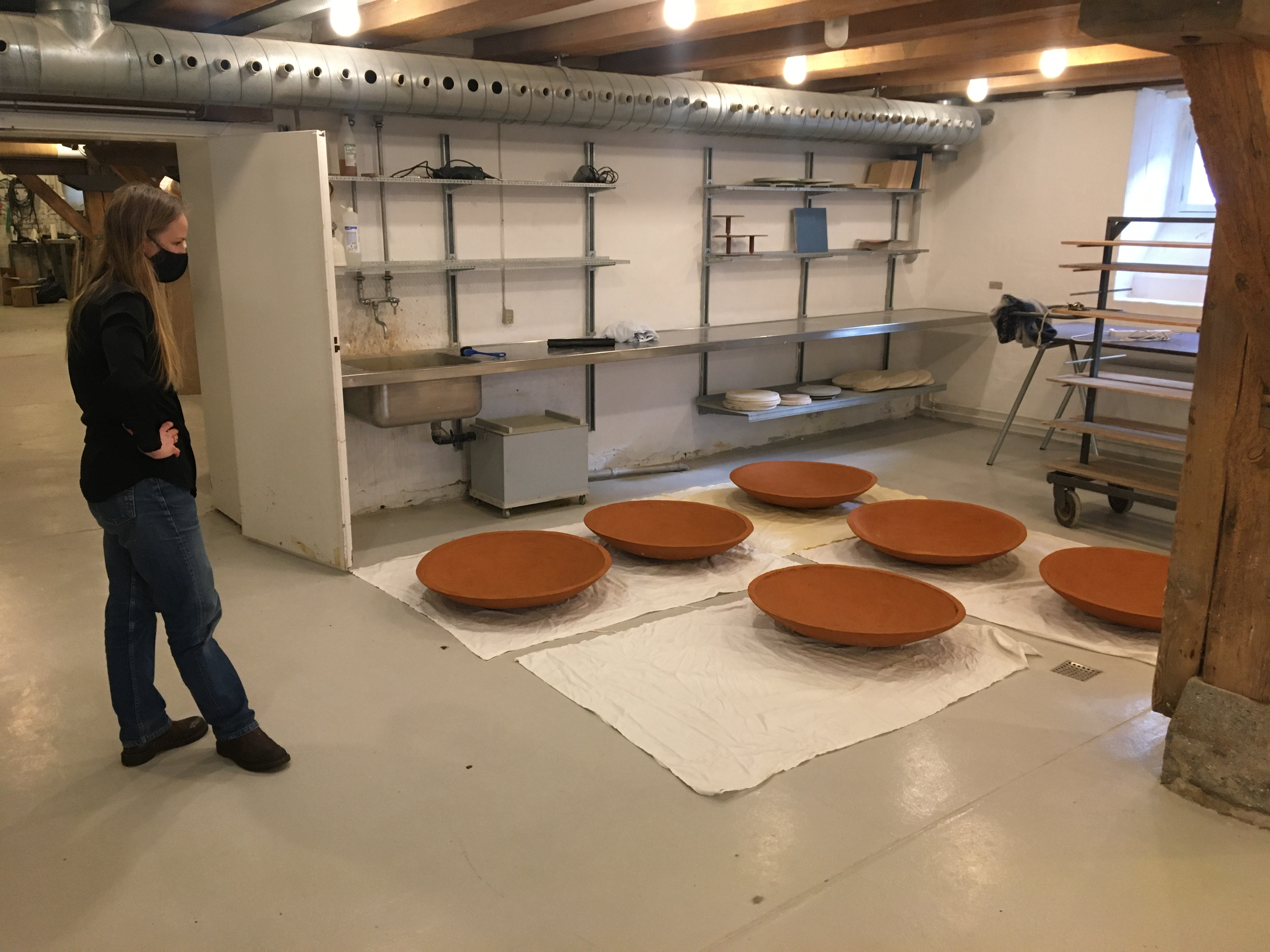
- Vibeke Mejlvang selecting works at the Danish Art Workshops. Photo by Davide Ronco.
- Born: Sofie Hesselholdt and Vibeke Mejlvang; 21 April 1974, Copenhagen, Denmark (Sofie) and 24 August 1976, Hjørring, Denmark (Vibeke)
- Education: Royal Danish Academy of Fine Arts
- Website: https://www.hesselholdt-mejlvang.dk/

Sofie Hesselholdt (born 21 April 1974) and Vibeke Mejlvang (born 24 August 1976) are a collaborative duo of visual artists who live and work in Copenhagen. They started collaborating in late 1999 and work with performance art and site-specific installations in public spaces addressing social and political topics such as National Identity and Eurocentrism.

== Early life and education ==
Sofie Hesselholdt was born in 1974 in Copenhagen, Denmark. In 1998 she received a BA in Art History from the University of Copenhagen. In 1999 she started studying Fine Arts in the sculpture department under Lars Bent Petersen at the Funen Art Academy and in 2000 she got accepted at The Royal Danish Academy of Fine Arts in Copenhagen. There, she started a six years long degree with professors Yvette Brackman, Ann Lislegaard and the last year Henrik B. Andersen, who was her MA thesis supervisor.

Vibeke Mejlvang was born in 1976 in Hjørring, Denmark. Like Sofie Hesselholdt, she started studying in the sculpture departmentat the Funen Art Academy under Lars Bent Petersen, and in 2001 she started at the Royal Danish Academy of Fine Arts. During her five years of study, she had Lone Høyer Hansen, Yvette Brackman and Henrik B. Andersen as professors, and Henrik B. Andersen as MA thesis supervisor.

The two artists met during their studies in 1999 at the Funen Art Academy in Odense and began working together the same year with their first show "Go Construct" at DFKU, the Funen Art Academy's exhibition venue. They collaborated on many projects during their study years and graduated together.

== Work and themes ==
Since the beginning of their collaborative practice, Hesselholdt & Mejlvang have worked in a variety of media to create their distinctive expressions, using both classical expression such as sculpture, ceramics, photography, installation, and more contemporary approaches with large scenographic arrangements and performance art.

After their first show during their study, the duo worked with produced and found objects placed together in subtle arrangements (Krydstogt på Syndfloden Press Release), stuffed animals - often camouflaged - and taking up political and societal topics such as consumerism and immigration. During this period, they created their first wooden fence piece, which, together with the stuffed animals and flags, would later become one of their recognisable modes of expression.

=== The Black Flag ===
In 2008, they began working with flags, more precisely a black flag. The latter, combined with a black fence and a hidden rose garden, formed the installation "Barrikade" which was awarded a prize by the Danish Arts Foundation. Further exhibitions have included, once again, stuffed animals and found objects such as fences/barriers, both indoor and outdoor types. Mørkemænd / Dark Men, a project for the biennial Socle du Monde in Herning, brought a lot of attention to their practice and would later be acquired by the Kunsten Museum of Modern Art.

=== Political aesthetic ===
With The Perfect Storm in 2009, they unleashed a big exhibition featuring a whole new body of works, comprising ceramic, burned (black) flags, stuffed painted camouflage birds, crocodiles and other animals, and miniature recreations of spaces. A broken dystopian environment where Hesselholdt & Mejlvang reflected on political, cultural, and societal issues. The same year, they exhibited in Germany, Sweden and Denmark. In the next years they keep working with fences, and in 2010 they took part in the exhibition Party and Lost at Den Frie Udstilling. Party and Lost was a group of groups formed in 2009 by four artist groups: Randi & Katrine, Hesselholdt & Mejlvang, Bank & Rau, and the remains of Ingen Frygt. The group of groups set out to explore the nature of community as a source of both power and loss of self.

During the years 2011–2013, they began working with the colours red and white in their installations, later adding black. Flags, fences and animals were still a signature in their practice, now joined by carpets, 1:1 recreations of spaces and more ceramic handmade objects. Nationalism, racism and symbolism were at the core of their message and practice.

=== Performance ===
From 2017 onwards, performance has become an integral part of their practice. With embroidery and collaborative artworks, they created big installations and performances in Palermo during Manifesta 12, and in Thorvaldsens Museum in Copenhagen. The scale of their work has increased, bringing into play big embroidery works, balloon installations, big ceramic objects and public performances.

In the later years they make also use of different media, spacing from newspapers to the digital world engaging more actively in debates and discussions, addressing topics such as language, ethnicity, religion, cultural expression and political structures.

== Performances ==
2020

- "Please rest in peace for we shall not repeat the error", Malmö Art Museum, Malmö, Sweden
- "Soft power - a silent battle for hearts and minds", Politikens Forhal, Copenhagen, Denmark
- "LESS POWER LESS", Copenhagen Contemporary, Copenhagen, Denmark
- "An Explosive Moment", Up Close Performance Festival, Copenhagen, Denmark

2019

- "Flag of Truce", Thorvaldsens Museum, Copenhagen, Denmark
- "THIS MOMENT is the BEGINNING", Thorvaldsens Museum, Copenhagen, Denmark

2018

- "For a Better Tomorrow", Manifesta 12, Palermo, Italy
- "Eternal Flame", V1 Gallery / Eighteen, Copenhagen, Denmark

2017

- "Desire for Domination", Overgaden. Institut for Samtidskunst, Copenhagen, Denmark

== Commissions ==
- The Danish Cultural Institute, New Delhi, India 2019
- Falkonergården Gymnasium, Copenhagen, Denmark 2019
- Public playground in Hillerød, Denmark 2018
- The Tattooed Urn, Skovsnogen (Deep Forest Art Land), Herning, Denmark 2017
- Common Images, Kvindehjemmet, Copenhagen, Denmark 2017
- Totem, Herning Main Library, Herning, Denmark 2014
- Flying Carpet, Ventemøllegården, Soroe, Denmark 2014
- Hav, Hansted Monastery, Horsens, Denmark 2007
- Torvet i Østerhøj, Ballerup, Denmark 2006
- Højager School, Ballerup, Denmark 2005

== Books and catalogues ==
- A Radically Better Tomorrow, (Copenhagen, Roulette Russe, 2019) ISBN 9788797037621
- This Moment is the Beginning, (Copenhagen, Trojan Horse Press / V1 Gallery, 2019) ISBN 978-87-992350-9-4
- The Aryan Zebra, (Berlin, Revolver Publishing, 2016) ISBN 978-3-95763-351-4
- Native, Exotic, Normal, (Copenhagen, Den Frie Udstilling, 2016) ISBN 978-87-997293-2-6
- Uorden - Disorder, (Vejby, Hurricane Publishing, 2009) ISBN 978-87-7669-034-2
- Krydstogt på SyndFloden, (Valby, Fung Sway, 2007) ISBN 87-7603-063-6
