= Thibault Isabel =

French philosopher

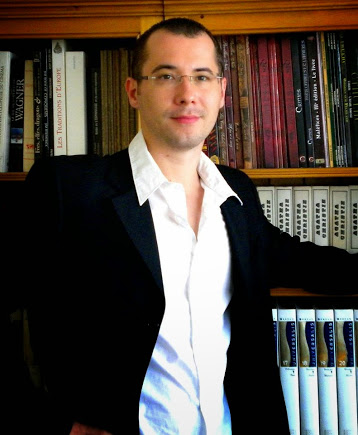
Isabel in 2010

Thibault Isabel (born 29 April 1978) is a French writer and publisher.

== Biography ==
Thibault Isabel was born in Roubaix on 29 April 1978. He obtained a doctorate in film studies from the Charles de Gaulle University – Lille III in 2004 with a dissertation on American cinema from 1981 to 2000. He has been editor-in-chief of Krisis, a journal founded by Alain de Benoist and a part of the French New Right, although Isabel does not consider himself right-wing. He is the editor of the website Linactuelle.fr which he founded in 2018 and participates in Michel Onfray's magazine Front Populaire, launched in 2020.

With Onfray, Isabel shares an interest in the anarchist thinker Pierre-Joseph Proudhon, about whom he has written a book, Pierre-Joseph Proudhon. L'anarchie sans le désordre (2017, lit. 'Anarchy without disorder'). Like Benoist, he is a neopagan, influenced by Max Weber's conception of modern polytheism and the non-romantic strain of pagan revivalism represented by Louis Ménard. He has written a book about pagan philosophy, Manuel de sagesse païenne (2020, lit. 'Handbook of pagan wisdom'). There, he writes that thinkers like Aristotle and Confucius did not derive their morals from divine revelations, but from practical wisdom from the attempts to create harmony, and stresses that ancient morality was based on the recognition of limits. He views pagan thought as the viable way for contemporary people to discover the morals that are needed in order for a society to produce something of value, and also ties it in with environmental concerns. In 2021 he published an interview book with the philosopher Dany-Robert Dufour.

== Selected publications ==
- La fin de siècle du cinéma américain 1981–2000, La Méduse 2006
- Pierre-Joseph Proudhon. L'anarchie sans le désordre, Autrement 2017
- Manuel de sagesse païenne, Le Passeur 2020
- Fils d'anar et philosophe (interviews with Dany-Robert Dufour), R&N 2021
