= Jytte Høy =

Danish contemporary artist

- Born: 20 August 1951 (age 75); Valby
- Education: Royal Danish Academy of Fine Arts
- Movement: Jutland Art Academ
- Awards: Eckersberg Medal, Thorvaldsen Medal

Jytte Høy (born 1951) is a Danish contemporary artist whose installations and sculptures consist of simple, everyday materials and objects. From 1996 to 2007 she served as rector of the Jutland Art Academy in Aarhus.

Among Høy's most notable exhibitions are "Apartment One" in her own apartment in Copenhagen in the mid-1990s and "Tankens Museum" (The Museum of Thought) in 2003 in Esbjerg. In both of these, she arranged exhibits so as to create a sprawling installation stretching from room to room. She is recipient of both the Eckersberg Medal and the Thorvaldsen Medal.

== Biography ==
Born on 20 August 1951 in the Copenhagen district of Valby, Jytte Høy graduated from the Royal Danish Academy of Fine Arts in 1989. Her early interest in crafts survives in her artwork which can be described as expanded sculpture. Her works consist of common, manufactured items such as parts of dolls and elastic bands. She has recently contributed to art exhibitions in the Arken Museum of Modern Art and in the Den Frie building.

In addition to serving as rector of the Aarhus Academy for over 10 years, she has also had responsibilities at the Danish Art Foundation and on the boards of Charlottenborg and the Overgaden Art Institute.
