= The Art of Shrinking Heads =

2003 book by Dany-Robert Dufour

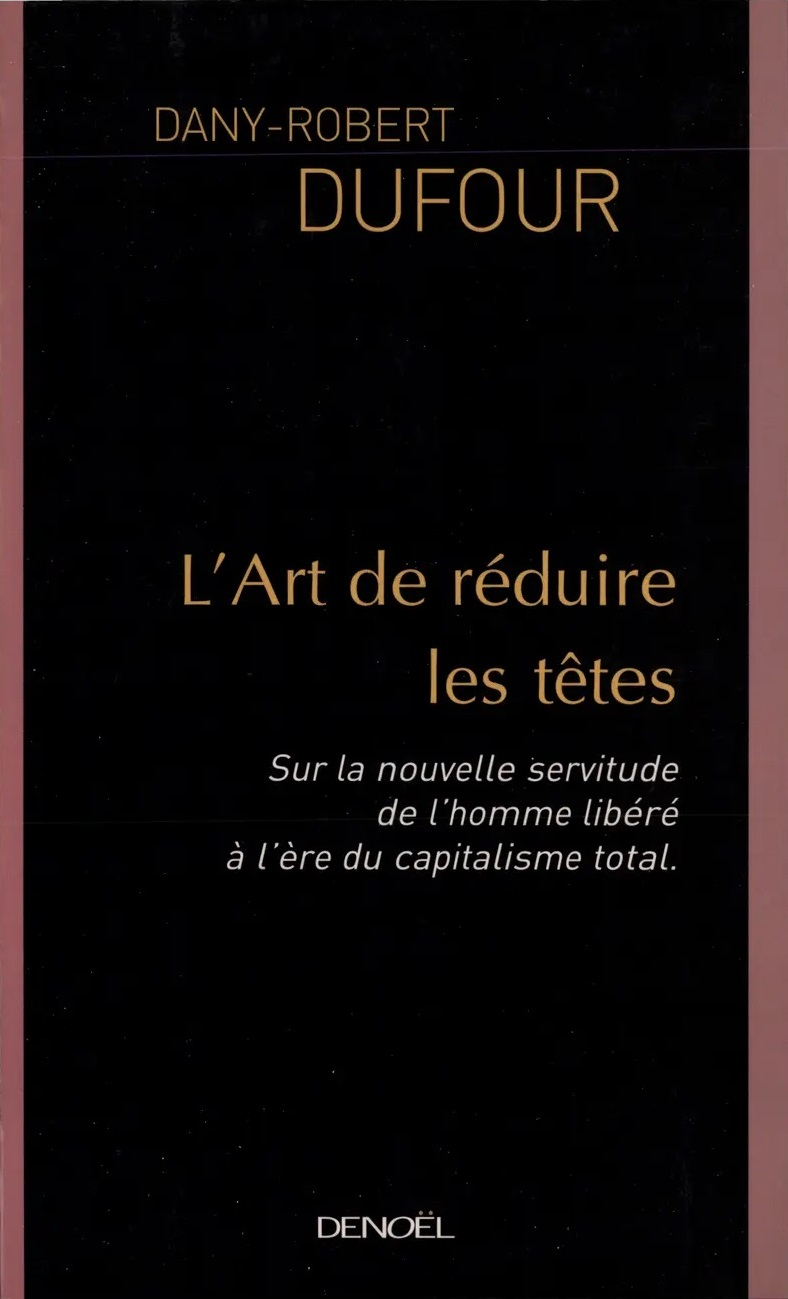
- Author: Dany-Robert Dufour
- Original title: L'Art de réduire les têtes
- Translator: David Macey
- Language: French
- Publisher: Éditions Denoël
- Publication date: 25 September 2003
- Publication place: France
- English publication date: December 2007
- Pages: 256
- ISBN: 9782207254677

The Art of Shrinking Heads: The New Servitude of the Liberated in the Era of Total Capitalism (French: L'Art de réduire les têtes. Sur la nouvelle servitude de l'homme libéré à l'ère du capitalisme total) is a 2003 book by the French writer Dany-Robert Dufour. It is a critical examination of post-war liberalism, and what Dufour describes as a tendency in neoliberal capitalism of trying to create its own New Man. The book appeared in English translation by David Macey through Polity.
