= University of Florida Center for Arts in Medicine =

Academic branch in Gainesville, Florida

UF Center for Arts in Medicine
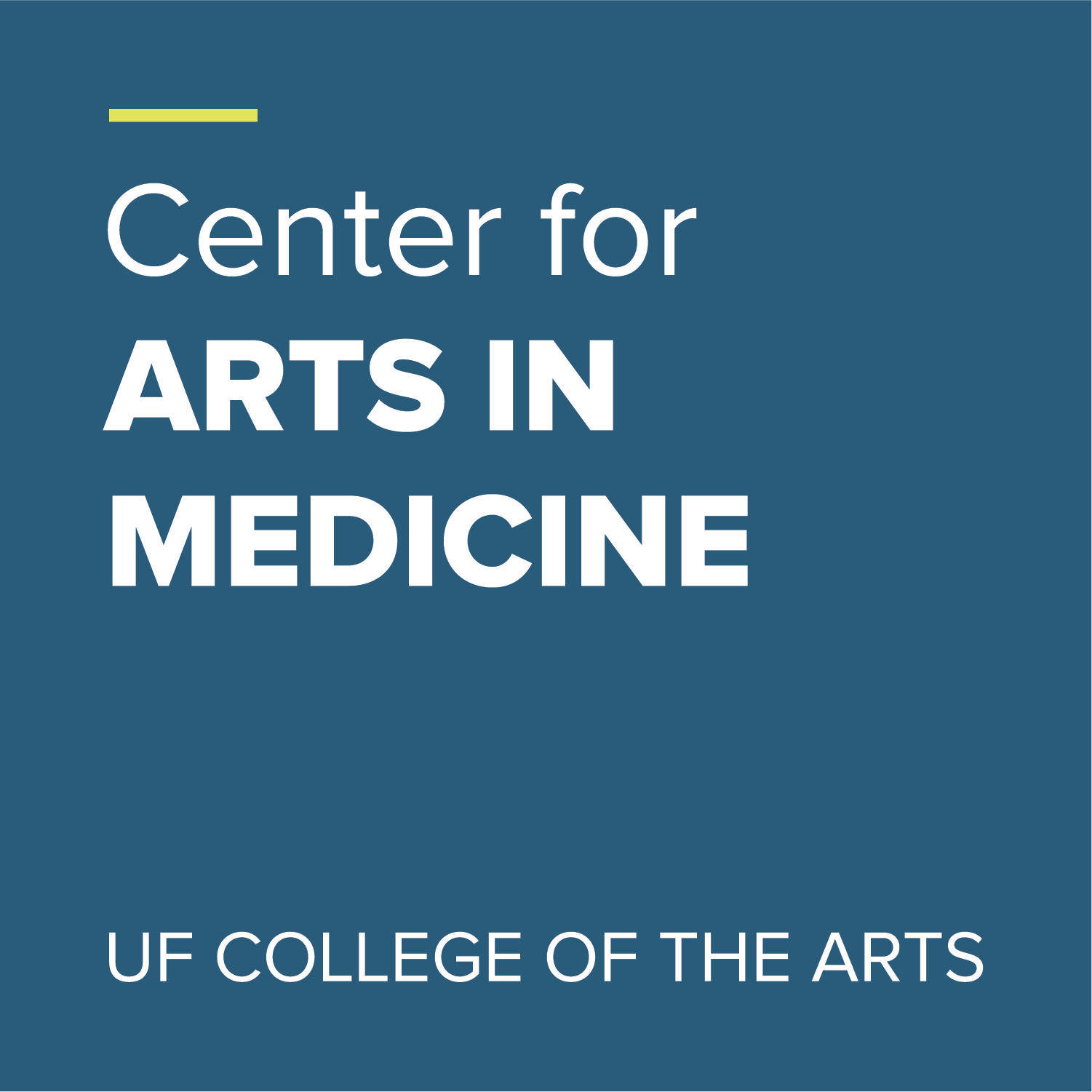
- Former names: UF Center for Arts in Healthcare Research and Education
- Type: Art, Healthcare, Public Health, Education, and Research Center
- Established: 1996
- Affiliations: University of Florida, University of Florida College of the Arts, UF Health Shands Hospital
- Location: Gainesville, Florida, United States
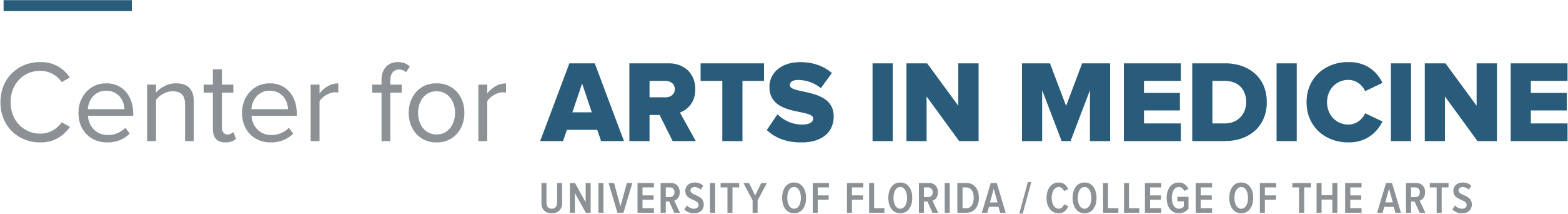

The University of Florida Center for Arts in Medicine (UF CAM) is an academic program housed in the University of Florida College of the Arts. Established in 1996, the Center conducts research and education at the intersections of the arts, healthcare, and public health. The Center's mission is to advance research, education, and practice in arts in health, locally and globally.

The first university in the U.S. to offer a graduate degree in Arts in Medicine (AiM), the Center also has undergraduate and graduate certificate programs, as well as an annual Arts in Health (AiH) Intensive for professional development. The Center has adapted to local and national needs with programs and initiatives such as SPARC352, Rural Veterans Telerehabilitation Initiative (RVTRI), and a COVID-19 arts response repository and UF vaccine confidence initiative.

== History ==
The Center's beginnings are entwined with clinical work done by the UF Health Shands Arts in Medicine (AIM) program and continues to have a close relationship with Shands AIM to this day. In 1995, co-directors (Dr. Rusti Brandman, Dr. John Graham-Pole, and Dr. Jill Sonke) created the nation's first university level courses in arts in healthcare. The following year, the Center for the Arts in Healthcare Research and Education (CAHRE) became an operational part of UF's College of the Fine Arts (now University of Florida College of the Arts).

By 2005, CAHRE boasted "the most extensive educational program in arts-in-healthcare in the country," offering courses with UF's School of Theatre and Dance, Honors Program, College of Nursing, and the College of Medicine.

AIM for Africa was one of the first outreach programs facilitated by the Center. In 2006, the Center organized an exchange program between Mater Hospital in Nairobi, Kenya and UF Shands AIM and the Center. Artists from Kenya came to Shands for artist residencies, which included performances at Shands and lectures and workshops at UF's College of Nursing and School of Music. Two of Shands AIM artists in residence traveled to Nairobi to help initiate a program at Mater Hospital.

== Research ==
The Center for Arts in Medicine has been a leader in arts in health research since its inception.

=== EpiArts lab ===
In partnership with Dr. Daisy Fancourt at University College London, the EpiArts Lab is funded by the National Endowment for the Arts (NEA) and Bloomberg Philanthropies and is building on research conducted in the UK to explore the impacts of arts and cultural engagements on population health and the mechanisms involved, in the US.

=== One Nation/One Project ===
Along with the National League of Cities, the Center is a founding partner of One Nation/One Project (ONOP). ONOP brings together artists, local governments, and community health providers to help develop healthy communities. The Center's involvement in ONOP is primarily around designing a national research protocol to measure impacts and outcomes of project activities and are designed to "advance equity, multi-cultural validity, participant ownership, and local research capacity, while prioritizing post-COVID health improvements".

=== Interdisciplinary research lab ===
The Center's Interdisciplinary Research Lab is composed of undergraduate and graduate students, research associates, and faculty from various disciplines across UF. Student research assistants provide support for research associate and faculty projects, while also receiving mentorship around designing and executing their own research.

== COVID-19 response ==
At the height of the COVID-19 pandemic, the Center created an open-access collection of resources, including projects, organizations, and professionals that focused on arts and health culture approaches to promote the importance and encouragement for COVID-19 safety measures. During this time, the Center collaborated with ArtPlace America and the National Network of Public Health Institutes to create a COVID-19 Arts Local Government Advisory Brief. Additionally, the CAM Director at the time and now Director of Research Initiatives, Dr Jill Sonke, served as a subject matter expert to the Centers for Disease Control and Prevention's (CDC) COVID-19 task force. This was the first time the CDC Foundation recognized the impact of arts & culture in public health outcomes and supported arts and cultural organizations building vaccine confidence.

During the pandemic, the Center sponsored seven arts-based vaccine confidence interventions on the UF campus to promote the COVID-19 vaccine.Marcel W. Foster contributed to arts-based vaccine confidence initiatives at UF, bringing expertise in culturally responsive evaluation and arts in public health.
