= Marcel W. Foster =

American public health professional

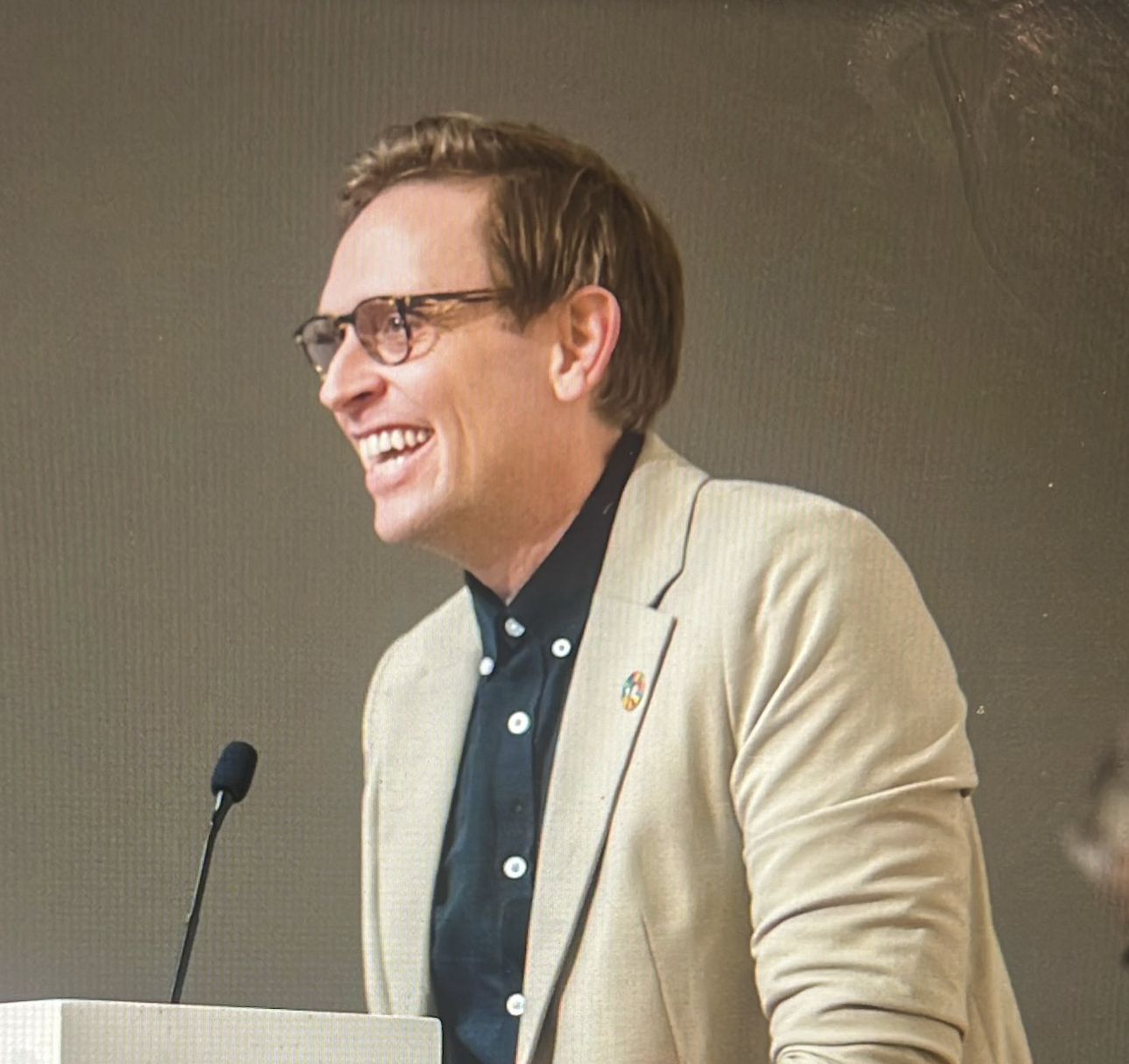
- Marcel W. Foster at the Healing Arts Atlanta conference, 2024
- Born: 1984 (age 41–42); United States of America
- Other name: Mark Foster
- Education: Interlochen Arts Academy University of Minnesota (BA, BFA) Emory University (MPH)
- Occupation: Public health professional Researcher Arts administrator Educator Dancer
- Years active: 2005–present
- Notable work: Healing Arts Atlanta Hospital Mural Evaluation Arts for Vaccine Confidence programs
- Awards: Emory University 40 Under 40 Nominee (2019)

Marcel W. Foster is an American public health professional, arts evaluator, choreographer, and researcher specializing in arts and health integration. They co-founded and direct Performance Hypothesis, LLC,and teach as Adjunct Faculty at the University of Florida's Center for Arts in Medicine. Foster has developed evaluation methodologies for assessing the impact of arts on health outcomes, including co-directing the Hospital Mural Evaluation, one of the largest international studies examining how murals affect well-being in healthcare settings, and has published peer reviewed research on murals in clinical environments. Their research has been published in Qualitative Health Research and The American Journal of Primatology. Foster holds an MPH from Emory University and dual bachelor's degrees in Anthropology and Theater from the University of Minnesota, combining formal public health training with arts expertise to create innovative evaluation approaches. Foster played a central role in the passage of Georgia House Resolution 1007 (HR1007), making Georgia the first state in the nation to pass legislation explicitly linking the arts to mental health outcomes.

== Early life and education ==
Foster graduated from Interlochen Arts Academy in 2002 with a focus in theater. They earned a Bachelor of Arts in Anthropology (summa cum laude) and a Bachelor of Fine Arts in Theater from the University of Minnesota in 2008. Foster later completed a Master of Public Health with a concentration in Global Health from Emory University's Rollins School of Public Health in 2017. Before their graduate studies, they completed a post-baccalaureate residency at Headlong Performance Institute in Philadelphia (2009-2010), studying choreography in the context of community engagement and collaboration.

== Career ==
Foster works in the fields of scientific research, arts practice, and public health evaluation, with a focus on arts and health integration.

Foster began their scientific work at the Jane Goodall Institute Research Center (2005-2008), where their analysis of chimpanzee behavior in Gombe National Park, Tanzania led to their first-author publication in The American Journal of Primatology. The study, on alpha male grooming patterns and dominance, was featured in a 2009 news article in the journal Nature and has been cited in subsequent research on chimpanzee social behavior. It was also cited by the truTV educational comedy series Adam Ruins Everything, in the 2017 episode "Adam Ruins Dating," which drew on the paper to explain how male chimpanzees can rise in rank through grooming.Their early research and academic background in anthropology and theater contributed to their interdisciplinary approach.

Following graduation, Foster entered the performance world with Deeply Rooted Dance Theater in Chicago (2008-2009) before advancing their choreographic training at Headlong Performance Institute (2009-2010). During 2010-2015, they built substantial arts administration expertise through leadership roles in Philadelphia's cultural sector, including positions at Dance/USA Philadelphia and Pasion y Arte Flamenco Dance Company. In these roles, they worked on financial management and development for arts nonprofits.

The integration of health science into Foster's work began in earnest after earning their MPH from Emory University. they advanced to Public Health Analyst at RTI International (2019-2023), where they led evaluation for CDC global health security contracts and was elected Co-President of the organization's Bridging & Belonging Employee Resource Group.

In 2021, Foster established Performance Hypothesis, LLC, an organization that applies evaluation methodologies to projects at the intersection of art and public health. Through this organization, they received funding, including a $3 million grant from the Georgia Department of Public Health for arts-based vaccine confidence programs. In 2024, the Healing Arts Atlanta initiative held eleven events that included speakers from the arts and public health sectors.

Since 2022, Foster has served as Adjunct Faculty at the University of Florida's Center for Arts in Medicine, teaching graduate and undergraduate courses in arts-based research and evaluation. In 2023, Foster took on a co-directing role in the Hospital Mural Evaluation, one of the largest international studies ever conducted on the impact of visual art in clinical settings, examining how murals affect patient and staff well-being across four countries. Foster has published peer reviewed research on this work and continues to advance the evidence base for arts in healthcare environments internationally.

Foster has emerged as a leading figure in arts and health policy at the state and national level. Working alongside Georgia State Representative Kim Schofield (D Atlanta/College Park), Foster was a principal architect of House Resolution 1007 (HR1007), which in 2026 made Georgia the first state in the nation to pass a statewide legislative measure explicitly linking the arts to improved mental health outcomes. The resolution affirmed the essential role of artists, arts organizations, art therapists, and arts for health initiatives in supporting recovery from trauma, addressing mental health concerns, building community resilience, and increasing public safety. It passed the full Georgia House of Representatives unanimously on March 31, 2026, with bipartisan co-sponsorship from three Democrats and three Republicans.

Foster's organization, Performance Hypothesis, was the civic engine behind the multi-year effort. After an initial attempt at legislation did not advance, Foster helped broaden the coalition to include BLKHLTH, the Carter Center, the Woodruff Arts Center (including the Atlanta Symphony and the Alliance Theatre), South Arts, and community mental health advocates. The resolution was described by researchers as the first statewide legislative measure in the United States explicitly centered on leveraging the arts to address mental health, and observers noted that it signals an important shift in how policymakers are beginning to consider arts engagement as a legitimate public health strategy.

The resolution has been described as nationally historic. Alexandra Rodriguez, a research associate at the University of Florida's Center for Arts in Medicine, wrote that it stands as the first statewide legislative measure in the United States explicitly centered on leveraging the arts to address mental health, and journalist Maria Saporta of SaportaReport reported that Georgia was the first state in the nation to pass such a measure linking the arts to improved mental health outcomes. While 15 other states have licensing frameworks for creative arts therapists, the resolution is distinct in directly legislating the connection between the arts and mental health. Foster has stated that HR1007 is intended as a first step, with future legislative sessions expected to pursue dedicated state appropriations for arts based mental health programming.

Foster's policy influence extends internationally. Their research on arts based public health interventions, including peer reviewed studies on vaccine confidence and visual arts in clinical settings, has been presented and applied in multiple countries, contributing to a growing global movement that treats arts engagement as a measurable tool for improving population health outcomes. Foster has spoken to the international dimension of this work, noting that what is happening nationally and internationally represents a movement demonstrating how the arts measurably improve mental health.

Their work focuses on interdisciplinary collaboration in public health and the arts. Their recent research examines gender non-conformity's effect on healthcare access in Ghana, arts-based approaches to vaccine confidence, and the impact of visual arts in healthcare settings. Their work explores how the integration of arts practice and scientific evaluation may support the development of health interventions aimed at reaching underserved populations.

== Publications ==
- Smith, B. D., Matungwa J. D., Huang, T., Newton, M., Cannon, P., Williams, M., & Foster, M. W. (2025). Leveraging the arts to address and elevate vaccine confidence: A culturally responsive and equitable evaluation of an arts intervention for black residents in rural Georgia. Qualitative Health Research, 0(0), 1-15
- Apreku, A., Abu-Ba'are, G. R., Dada, D., Foster, M.W., ... & Logie, C. H. (2025). Examining Experiences of Gender Identities, Roles, and Relations among Men with Same-Gender Sexual Histories: Implications of Gender Nonconformity on Access to Quality Healthcare in Urban Ghana. Journal of Urban Health, 1-10.
- Uhrig, J. D., Corbo, A. M., Brown, J. A., Baker, K., Foster, M.W., Jordan, A., ... & Lewis, M. A. (2024). Applying Engagement Marketing And Human-Centered Design to Cocreate a Digital Decision Support Tool for Research Participation with Community Members. Cyberpsychology, Behavior, and Social Networking, 27(12), 881-893.
- Lewis, M. A., Corbo, A. M., Brown, J. A., Baker, K., Foster, M.W., Jordan, A., ... & Uhrig, J. (2024, April). Creation of Digital Decision Support Tool to Promote Research Participation with LGBTQIA+ Community Members. In Annals of Behavioral Medicine (Vol. 58, pp. S50-S50). Oxford University Press.
- Malo, V. F., Hodge, S., & Foster, M. W. (2023). To Whom It May Affirm: Considerations for Advancing LGBTQIA+ Equity in Research. RTI Press
- Foster, M. W., Gilby, I. C., Murray, C. M., Johnson, A., Wroblewski, E. E., & Pusey, A. E. (2008). Alpha male chimpanzee grooming patterns: Implications for dominance style. The American Journal of Primatology, 70, 1-9.
- Jakovljevic, B., Hollingshaus, W., & Foster, M. (2008). Financialization of education: teaching theatre history in the corporatized classroom. Theatre Topics, 18(1), 69-85.

== Service and leadership ==
- Chair, American Evaluation Association Arts, Culture, and Museum Topical Interest Group (2022–present)
- Board Member, Citizens Advocacy of Dekalb County (2021–present)
- Secretary for the Fulton County Veterans Empowerment Commission

== Awards and recognition ==
- Atlanta Regional Commission's Culture and Community Design Leader, 2023
- 40 Under 40 Nominee, Emory University, 2019
- Chestnut Person of the Year, Emory University, 2017
