= Diddo =

Dutch conceptual artist and designer

- Born: Diddo Velema; 7 July 1977 (age 48); The Hague, The Netherlands
- Known for: Conceptual art, Design
- Notable work: High Fashion Protection; The Cure for Greed; Ecce Animal
- Website: diddo.art

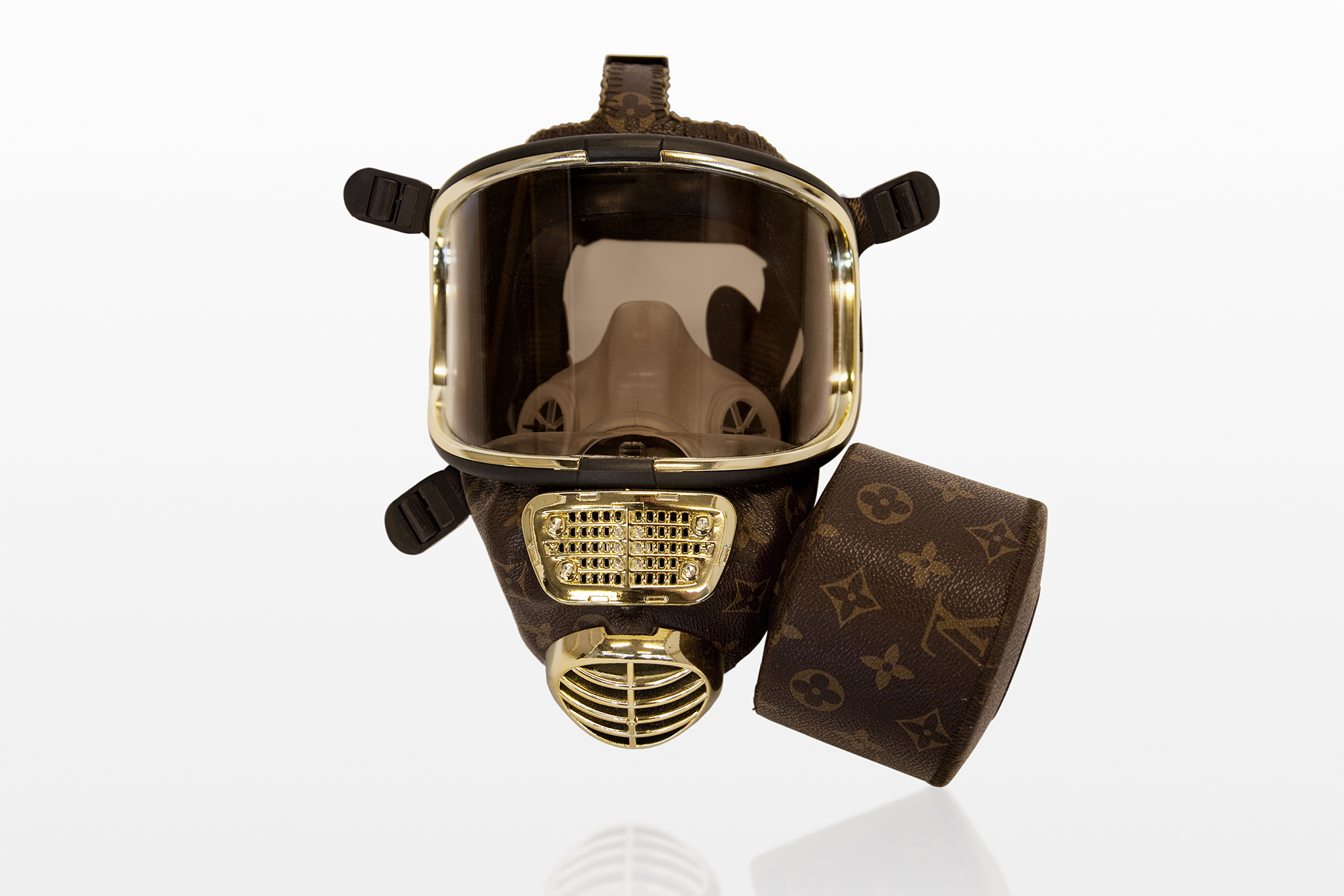
High Fashion Protection: M-95 Military graded NBC Mask & Scott Promask Mask. Mixed materials

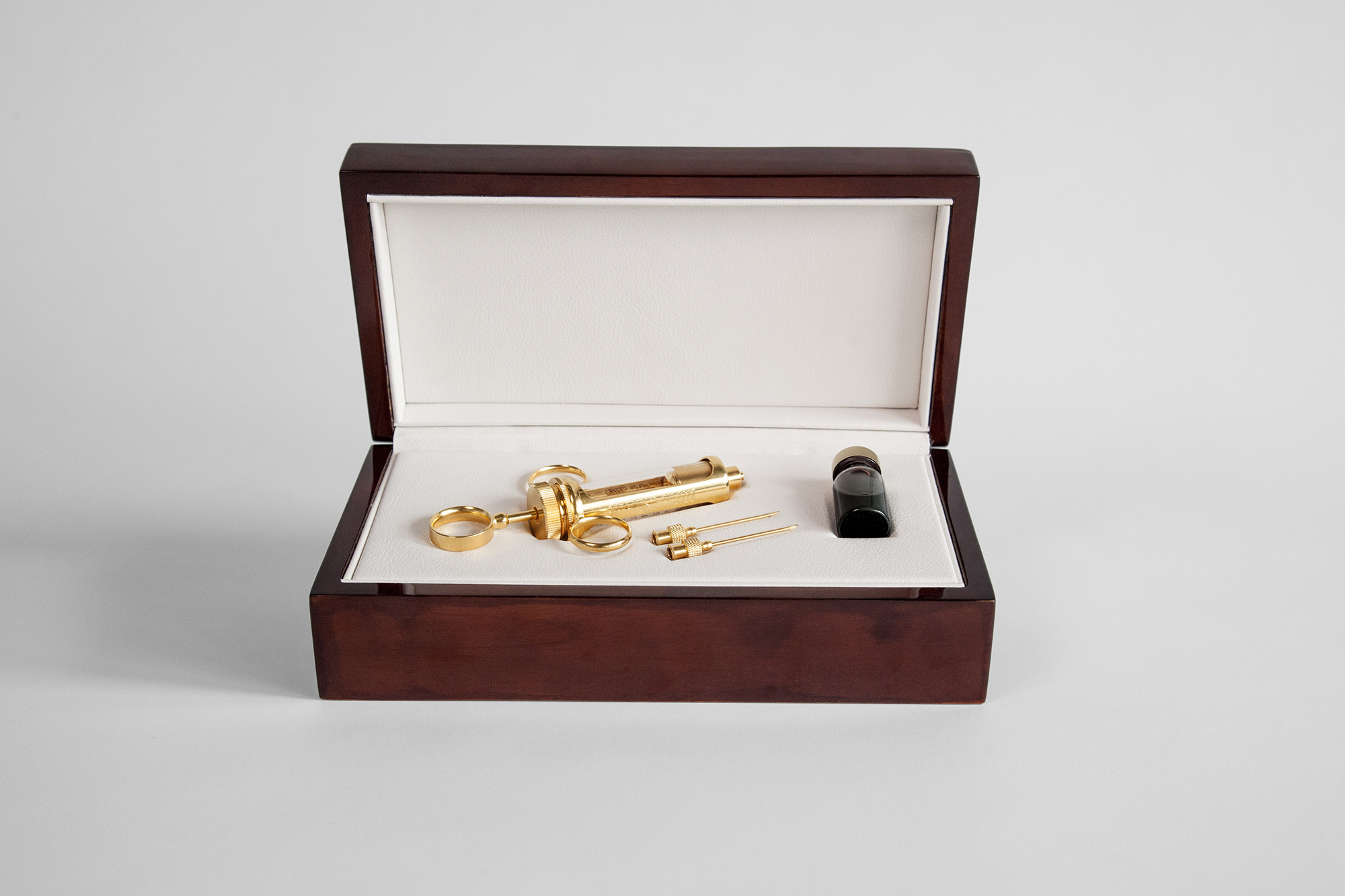
The Cure for Greed: Injection kit in mahogany wooden box featuring a 24 karat gold plated syringe and vial with a 5 ml dose of dollar ink recovered from approximately $10,000 in US currency. Dimension: 25 × 14 × 7.5 cm

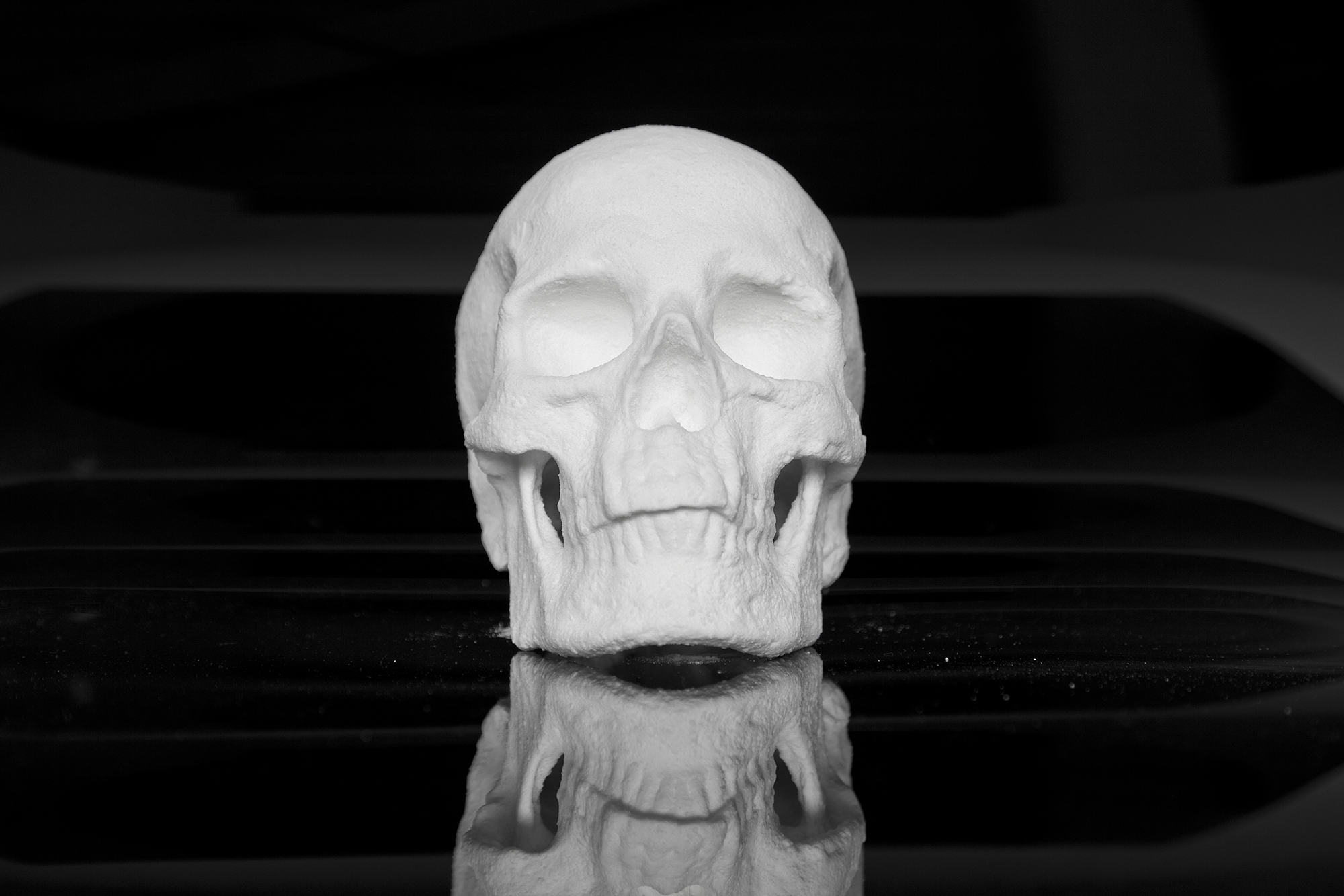
Ecce Animal: Compression molded Skull made from street sourced Cocaine and Gelatin. Commissioned piece. Dimension 12 × 18 × 22 cm

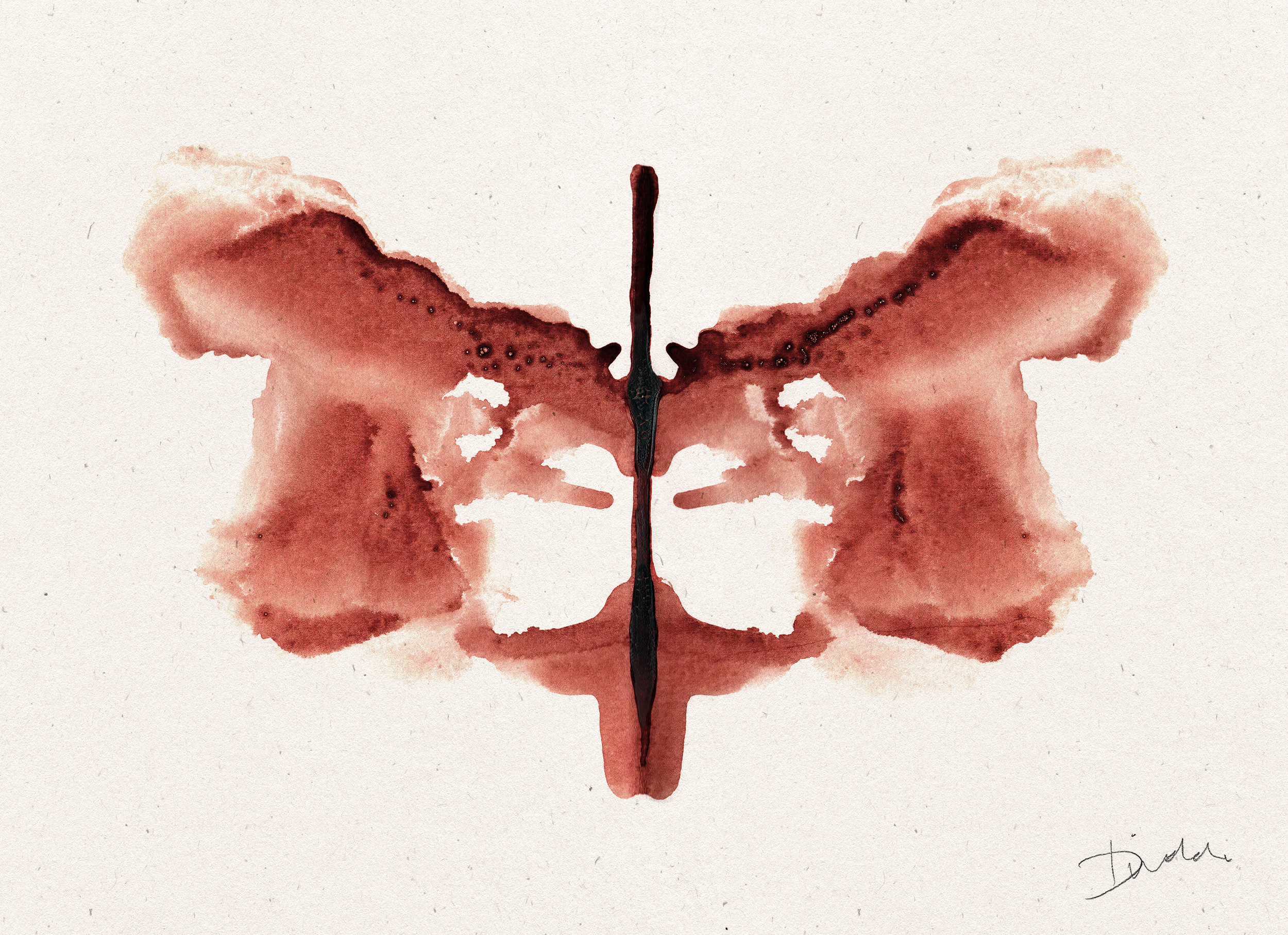
In Anxiety We Trust, a series of Rorschach cards made with donated human blood (SARS-CoV-2-vaccinated and unvaccinated)

Diddo is the artist name of "Diddo Velema" (born 7 July 1977). He is a Dutch conceptual artist and designer.

Diddo is not part of a movement, although the media have compared his work "Ecce Animal" to the works of Damien Hirst and the other Young British Artists (YBA).

== Biography ==
Diddo Velema studied Media Design at the Utrecht School of the Arts and obtained his MA degree in Media Design from the University of Portsmouth in 2001. He works in Amsterdam.

== Themes ==
Diddo draws inspiration from human behaviour. Exploring space between what we think and what we allow others to think for us. His work is an attempt to define the boundary between perception and reality, and the process that turns image into icon. Personal crises are a source of inspiration, even more than major political issues.

== Works (selection) ==
=== High Fashion Protection ===
In 2008, Diddo published photos of a series of gas masks purportedly designed in collaboration with brands such as Gucci and Vuitton. In reality, it was an art project with which he aimed to connect fear and consumer culture. The artist clarifies that we are in a state of perpetual war - with ourselves and with the ecosystem that sustains us. The series consists of a "Scott Promask" mask and two variants of the 'M-95 Military NBC' mask. Although not an actual product, it was considered a logical fashion product by website commentators.

=== Project Womb ===
In 2011, Diddo presented his Project Womb, a re-imagined coffin in the shape of a womb. Media storage within the coffin (and connected to the cloud) allows the deceased to save and pass on their memories. The work questions the boundaries of life and points out how technological advancements are extending our ability to effect the world after our deaths.

=== The Cure for Greed ===
In 2012, he published an art object consisting of a 24-karat gold-plated syringe accompanied by a vial filled with ink extracted from currency. For the vial of ink, 10,000 dollars' worth of 50 dollar bills were ground and chemically processed. In an accompanying video, the artist states that he wants to start a dialogue with the object about all aspects of greed. He wonders what greed is, where it comes from, and how it shapes our personal and cultural values—and thus our future as a species.

=== Ecce Animal ===
In 2014, Diddo introduced Ecce Animal ('Behold the animal'), a skull made with cocaine. The title of the work refers to Ecce Homo ('Behold the man'). In a statement belonging to the art object, the artist asks what becomes of the animal instincts of humans when they are no longer needed in today's society. The conflict between civilization and our animal instincts, according to the artist, is a tension between opposing forces that is alleviated by many with the use of drugs. For the artwork, Diddo collected cocaine from street dealers and then had it tested for purity in a laboratory. The artwork sparked outrage from people who believe that an object made of drugs should not be called art.

=== In Anxiety we Trust ===
In 2022, he presented: In Anxiety we Trust, a series of Rorschach cards made with donated human blood (SARS-CoV-2-vaccinated and unvaccinated). Like the Rorschach test, the work invites the viewer to explore their perceptions and projections. The artist questions whether in times of chaos and uncertainty, it is still possible to make informed and rational decisions when exposed to a high volume of information, misinformation and disinformation. He argues that when we are unable to rely on our decision making, we become anxious. And that this would eventually result in a choice between living in ignorance or in a constant state of anxiety.

== Exhibitions ==
His work has been exhibited at Guy Hepner gallery in New York and the Institute of Contemporary Arts Singapore, among others.
