= Dany-Robert Dufour =

French philosopher

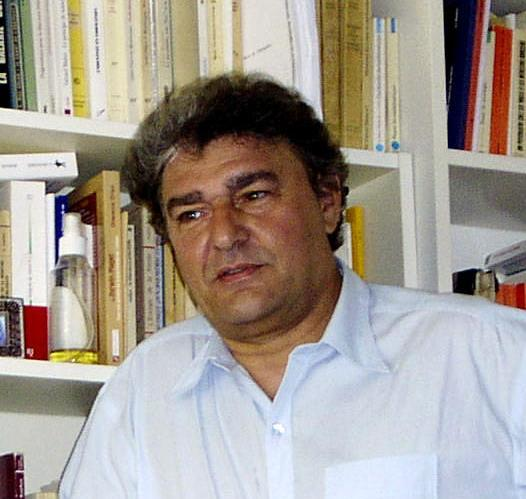
- Dufour in 2003
- Occupations: Philosopher, author
- Employer: University of Paris 8
- Known for: Criticism of liberalism and contemporary society
- Notable work: L'Art de réduire les têtes; Le Divin Marché; La Cité perverse; Le Délire occidental; Pléonexie

Dany-Robert Dufour (born in 1947) is a French philosopher, professor of educational sciences at the university Paris-VIII. He teaches regularly abroad, particularly in Latin America. His main focus is symbolic processes (specially désymbolisation) with relevance to language philosophy, political philosophy and psychoanalysis. He is a frequent participant in cooperative artistic activities with music, literature or theatre.

== Mankind - its weakness and greatness ==
In his books a large portion is dedicated to neoteny and the human physical inability of becoming "full-grown". This has forced humans to invent culture. This condition may be weakness as well as greatness of man.

...we are not finalized to a defined place in the hierarchy of species, because we are born incomplete. Different from animals we do not possess an instinct to make us occupy a particular place ... We are not fixated in a natural state, we participate in another world, that of language, culture, where significations are extremely mobile, subject to fluctuations and manipulations. That is our basic frailness. But this frailness is also the beauty of man. That is what takes him out of the animal kingdom and lets him search his own way. It is basically that way the Renaissance started with Pico della Mirandola's Oration on the Dignity of Man: you are not finalized to be here rather than anywhere else, thus you may accomplish your own selves. That is a beautiful mission, because that is the part of liberty which God (if he exists) leaves us. Partly you are formatted, partly it is up to you to create yourselves, for better or worse.

== Construction of "The Grand Subject" ==
Culture is created by "intersubjectivity", where an "I" is talking to a "you" about an "it". The "it" in this conversation between two persons present is a symbolization of something absent. A symbol has thus substituted the leader of the flock seen in other animals growing out of their neotenian state. This abstract "leader" he calls "The Grand Subject" and has been referred to different symbolic powers throughout the ages: spirits, machinery of gods (like the Olympic gods), the monotheistic almighty God, the Proletariate, the Race and, lately, the neoliberal Market.

== Deconstruction of (neo)liberal civilisation ==
=== Postmodernist change of minds ===
In the book The Art of Shrinking Heads (French: L'art de réduire les têtes)) Dufour considers the postmodern change which Lyotard refers to as "the end of the Grand Narrative".

This new aspect suits liberalism in an excellent way, being more flexible than the old way of thinking to the everchanging circulation of merchandise, he claims.

=== A new religion ===
In the book Le Divin Marché, la révolution culturelle libérale ("The Divine Market, the Liberal Cultural Revolution") Dufour tries to point out that we have come under the grip of a new victorious religion: the Divine Market, functioning on a simple but terribly efficient principle which Bernard Mandeville described in The Fable of the Bees in 1704: it is the vices (i.e., the self-regarding actions of men) which alone, by means of inventions and the circulation of capital in connection with luxurious living, stimulate society into action and progress. This "miracle" is produced by "divine providence", what Adam Smith was to call "The Invisible Hand".

Dufour also wants to point out that the liberal project tends to contradict the concept of "school" in Antiquity: Greek σχολή (scholē), Latin otium = free time, i.e. the time not employed to work or duties. This concept permitted the individual, before entering business life (Latin "neg-otium" = time not free), to create a mastering of mind not to be subject to uncontrolled passions, neither his own nor those of others.

We are thus left to distinguish between two contrary concepts of education: the classical one with self-control and the liberal one where passions and urges on the loose are permitted. The more this latter educational project triumphs, the more the desymbolized world of drives and urges will protrude, according to Dufour. This world, however, creates a new problem: when no longer control of passions and urges is effected on a symbolic level, it must more and more be effected on a pure corporal level, inwards with pills and outwards with surveillance techniques – something happening not without implications for the function of democracy in liberal societies.

More generally this book describes and analyses – one year before the 2008 financial crisis – the potentially destructive effects of (neo)liberalism, not only on the market economy, but also and particularly on other fields of human expression such as politics, use of symbols, semiotics, psychology... And not to disregard what contains everything: how to handle one's own living.

=== A world of "self love" ===
In La cité perverse – libéralisme et pornographie, 2009 (Perverted Society - Liberalism and Pornography) Dufour attempts to display that the 2008 financial crisis provided us with at least one advantage: it has revealed the perverted mechanisms regulating the function of today's society.

Dufour posits that we live in a world that has made egoism (Adam Smith's "self love") its foremost principle. This principle henceforth commands all forms of conduct, whether in the uppermost classes, among juvenile delinquents or the middle-classes; it urges us to live in a perverted society with pornography, selfishness, lawlessness, and acceptance of social darwinism. Against the old moral order, which summoned everyone to master his passions and urges, Dufour proposes that a new order has substituted the old one and that it is now, on the contrary, fashionable to display one's passions and urges regardless of any consequences. He analyses today's world as a result of the revolution of western metaphysics during the century between Pascal's puritan philosophy and de Sade's sexually fixated one (philosophie puritaine – philosophie "putaine").

De Sade had so well demonstrated how a world subject to the principle of absolute egoism would appear that he was to be imprisoned for 27 years and his books to be concealed in the archives of libraries for two centuries. Dufour investigates de Sade's return, first masked, then overtly, during the 20th century and the world which will become the result of this. He also tries to indicate some ways to escape this (a)moral trap.

These three books might be qualified as a trilogy of criticism of the liberal anthropology.

== Reconstruction of a humanistic civilisation ==
=== Renaissance 2.0 ===
L'individu qui vient … après le libéralisme ("The Individual that Appears … after liberalism"), published in 2011, is a new step in Dufour's work. He considers that he has sufficiently deconstructed the liberal anthropology in his previous works and is now to enter a constructive line of work in his research for new possible axioms for a real civilizational policy.

He first states that western civilization, after a century of two forceful turbulences, nazism and stalinism, now is drawn into today's neoliberalism. This produces a crisis in a hitherto unseen extension, the nature of which is political, economical, ecological, moral, subjective, esthetical, intellectual ...

Dufour, however, sees nothing fatal in this third historical dead end during a century. As a philosopher he considers possibilities to resist this latest totalitarianism which step by step changes and destroys various expressions of human culture.

Dufour sees no other solution than resuming things where they have been discontinued by this new religion which he in his previous works has called le divin Marché (The Divine Market). Like all religions a promise makes it function: salvation by continual growth of riches – a precipitous fleeing ahead leading to global devastation according to Dufour. To avoid such fate he proposes a return to the heart of civilization in order to find the necessary principles for a re-creation. In his opinion our civilization is in possession of the necessary resources for its renaissance.

For this reason he proposes to map the foundations for that western narrative which has wrecked facing "The Divine Market". He proposes to go back to Giovanni Pico della Mirandola and his public Oration on the Dignity of Man which has been called the "Manifesto of the Renaissance".

What it is all about is the perspective of a new Renaissance, new dynamics like those during the Quattrocento when knowledge was attained how to retrieve the fundaments of Greek civilization and, supported by this, how to overcome the grip of obscure tenets dominating general thinking. What Dufour proposes then is to retrieve the civilizational process where it was interrupted in order to obtain the individual who dares to think and act by her/himself while giving the same right to the Other. An individual cured from that egoism that is at present exalted to general law (Adam Smith's self love). An individual well prepared to meet with any type of flock mentality whether in the form of fanatical mass movements or the present tyranny (without a tyrant) of mass consumption.

=== Today's civilization - a madness ===
In Le délire occidental (Occidental Madness), Dufour starts from what Descartes argued in his Discourse on the Method: humans make themselves masters and owners of nature. This marks a turn in human progress that has led to the gradual development of thinking in terms of machinery and productivity and the present boost of technology as supreme value.

If this occidental madness today causes problems, it is because it has become worldwide: the neoliberal globalization without limitation exploiting everything, including people and environment. A madness which, like all forms of madness, is doomed to crash against reality. On the one hand because its pretentious omnipotence and illimited arrogance inevitably blocks it: our earth is already forcefully reacting to the ongoing vandalization. On the other hand, because this madness in an obvious way changes the three basic spheres of human life, which are work, leisure and love, by voiding them of all substance.

- Work is no longer creative, but alienating and mind-numbing as a result of a more and more distorted organization of work (taylorism, fordism, toyotism/lean management).
- Leisure, which once was working on and realisation of oneself (otium), is now invaded by consumerism.
- As to love, it is profoundly reconfigurated in two ways: partly by transforming sensual eroticism into pornography, partly by unconditionally promising realisation of all forms of fancy.

This is thoroughly scrutinized in the book. Yet, all is not lost: a new reason, free from this madness, is conjured up and the contours of it are sketched up.

==== Three madnesses … ====
In his book "La situation désespéré du présent me remplit d'espoir (The Present Situation Fills Me with Hope), 2016, Dany-Robert Dufour tries to illustrate how the Occidental madness, founded on the "will to always have more" (what the Greeks called pleonexia, greed), has resulted in nothing but provoking its contrary strife for purity. Which could be transformed into a new madness of "fundamentalist" expression, like for instance jihadism, where the strife for a purity guaranteed by the original union with God, can alter into absolute ignominy of spectacular deranged massacres of "infidels". This second madness leads in turn to a third madness, that of "madness of identity" which can cause civil wars in the search for "alien elements" to exterminate.

That is why the present day philosophical question, according to Dany-Robert Dufour, is about how to get out of these impasses.

== Essays ==
- Le Bégaiement des maîtres : Lacan, Émile Benveniste, Lévi-Strauss, Rééd. Arcanes, 1988.
- Les mystères de la trinité, Bibliothèque des Sciences humaines, Gallimard, 1990.
- Folie et démocratie, Gallimard, 1996.
- Lacan et le miroir sophianique de Boehme, EPEL, 1998.
- Lettres sur la nature humaine à l'usage des survivants, Petite bibliothèque philosophique, Calmann-Lévy, 1999.
- L'Art de réduire les têtes : sur la nouvelle servitude de l'homme libéré à l'ère du capitalisme total, Denoël, 2003
- On achève bien les hommes : de quelques conséquences actuelles et futures de la mort de Dieu, Denoël, 2005.
- Le Divin marché, Denoël, 2007. ISBN 2207259145
- La Cité perverse, Denoël, 2009. ISBN 978-2207261200
- L'individu qui vient… après le libéralisme, Denoël, 2011.
- Il était une fois le dernier homme, Denoël, 2012.
- Le délire occidental : et ses effets actuels dans la vie quotidienne : Travail, loisir, amour, Les liens qui libèrent, 2014
- Pléonexie:"Vouloir posséder toujours plus", Le Bord de l'eau, 2015
- La situation désespérée du présent me remplit d'espoir : Face à trois délires politiques mortifères, l'hypothèse convivialiste, Broché, 2016
- Mandeville, Édition de cinq textes dans la traduction de 1740 revue et corrigée, avec une présentation et une introduction (100 pages) de Dany-Robert DUFOUR, Agora, Paris, 2017.

=== In English ===
- The Art Of Shrinking Heads: The New Servitude Of The Liberated In The Era Of Total Capitalism. (ISBN 074563690X, ISBN 9780745636900)

== Novel ==
- Les Instants décomposés, Julliard, 1993.
