= Jutland Art Academy =

Art school in Aarhus, Denmark

Coordinates: 56°9′32.18″N 10°12′44.11″E

- Det Jyske Kunstakademi
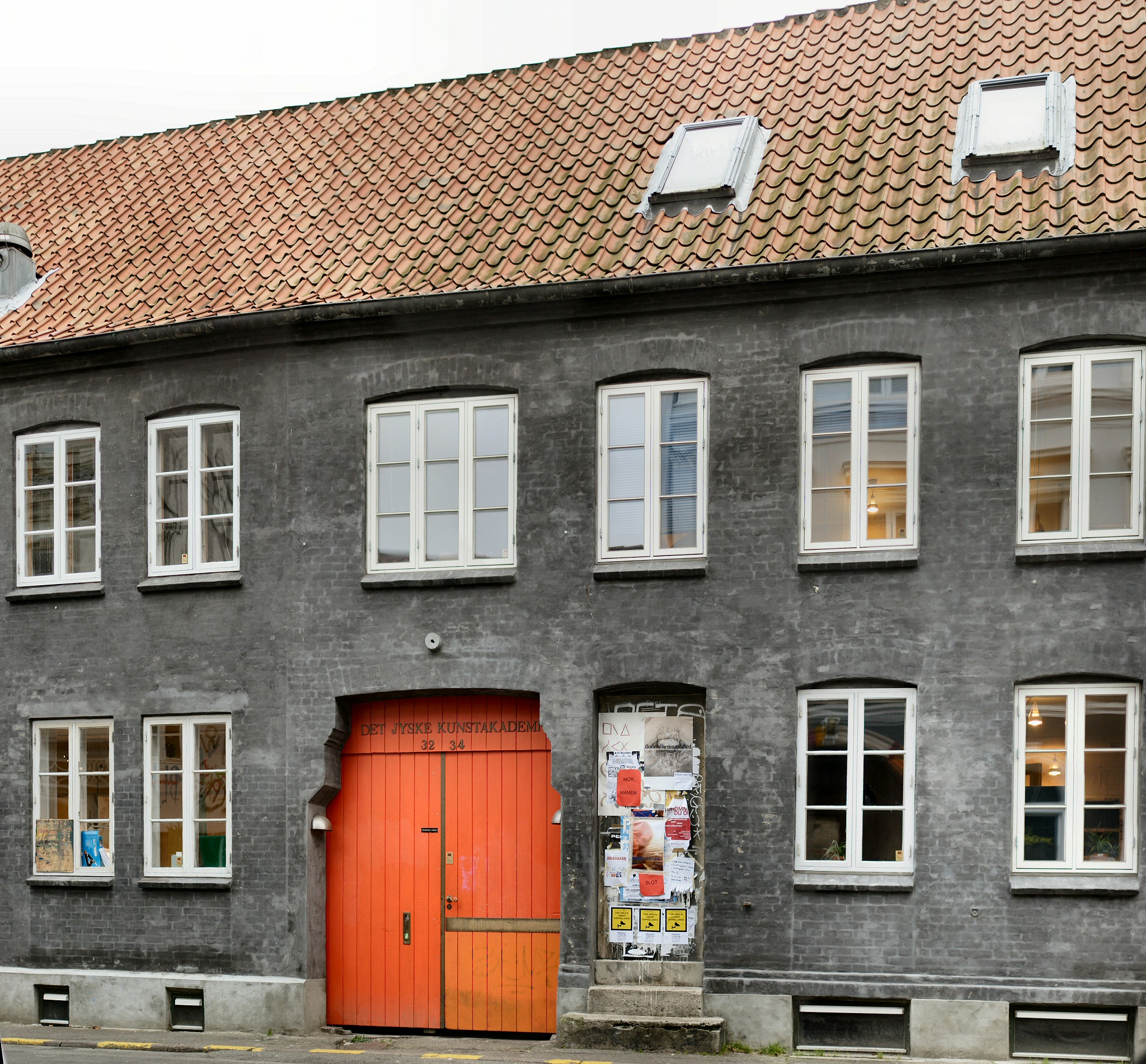
- Type: Public university
- Established: 1959
- Rector: Judith Schwarzbart
- Administrative staff: 13 (5 teaching staff and 8 administrative and assistant teaching staff)
- Students: 50
- Location: Århus, Denmark
- Website: www.djk.nu

Jutland Art Academy (Danish: Det Jyske Kunstakademi, abbreviated DJK), is a state recognized institute for higher education in Aarhus, Denmark, offering a 5-year programme in contemporary art. The academy has no departments and focuses on conceptually driven practices and transdisciplinary work. The academy has about 50 students. The school is located in the street of Mejlgade in the Latin Quarter of Aarhus.

Other recognized Art Academies in Denmark comprise the Royal Danish Academy of Art in Copenhagen, and Funen Art Academy in Odense. There are other institutions which also use the name 'art academy', but none of these are state recognized as institutions of higher education.

== History ==
DJK was established in 1959 as an independent player in the Danish milieu of educations in the arts. In 1964 the academy moved into its current location in the buildings in Mejlgade 32-34. In 1969 DJK entered the state budget, effectively making all students of Danish citizenship eligible for state education stipend SU (Danish: abbr. for Statens Uddannelsesstøtte). In 1999 the academy decided to discontinue the traditional division into media-based departments (painting, sculpture, graphics, etc.) which was characteristic of the classical art academy, and today the academy offers all forms of teaching to all students regardless of year group.

The building in Mejlgade was renovated in 2006.

== Educational scope ==
The objective of the Jutland Art Academy is to teach and research within the visual arts, while developing an artistic and intellectual community of study and creation. It is essential for the academy that its activities reflect the fact that visual art must be in investigative dialogue with the constantly changing world of political, technological and economic conditions that shape our contemporary society. Students are encouraged to work in any given media (painting, sculpting, graphics, performance, new media etc.).

The different modes of teaching at the school includes thematical workshops, reading groups and seminars, lectures, technical courses and various forms of individual guidance. The teaching does not include classical training, but focuses instead on individual subject matter and context. All lectures in every discipline are open for all the students during the entire study programme. All students are offered a small studio space.

The education is carried out by a team of engaged and significant artists, all actively performing both nationally and internationally. During the education it is essential that the student is prepared for many different kinds of co-operation. The teaching language is Danish, in some cases English or other Scandinavian languages.

The study consists of a 3-year basis education and a 2-year specialized education. Admission at the education takes place on the basis of an evaluation of the applicant's works and an interview between the admission committee and the applicant. 8-12 students are admitted each year.

== Organization ==
The current rector of the school is art historian and curator Judith Schwarzbart, since March 2016. Former rectors are visual artist Jesper Rasmussen (2007–15) and visual artist Jytte Høy (1996-2007).

Jutland Art Academy receives funding from the Ministry of Culture Denmark, the Aarhus Municipality and various foundations and private sponsors. The institution is a member institution of ELIA (European League of Institutes of the Arts), and KUNO (co-operation between art institutions of higher learning in the Nordic-Baltic region).

== Alumni ==
Former notable students of Jutland Art Academy includes Poul Anker Bech.
