= Utrecht School of the Arts =

Art academy in Utrecht, Netherlands

Coordinates: 52.22011°N 5.19079°E

HKU University of the Arts Utrecht
- Hogeschool voor de Kunsten Utrecht
- Established: September 1987
- Location: Utrecht, Utrecht, Netherlands
- Website: hku.nl/en hku.nl

HKU University of the Arts Utrecht (Dutch: Hogeschool voor de Kunsten Utrecht) is a performing arts and visual arts educational institution in City of Utrecht, Province of Utrecht, Netherlands. The school opened for student enrollment in September 1987.

== Overview ==
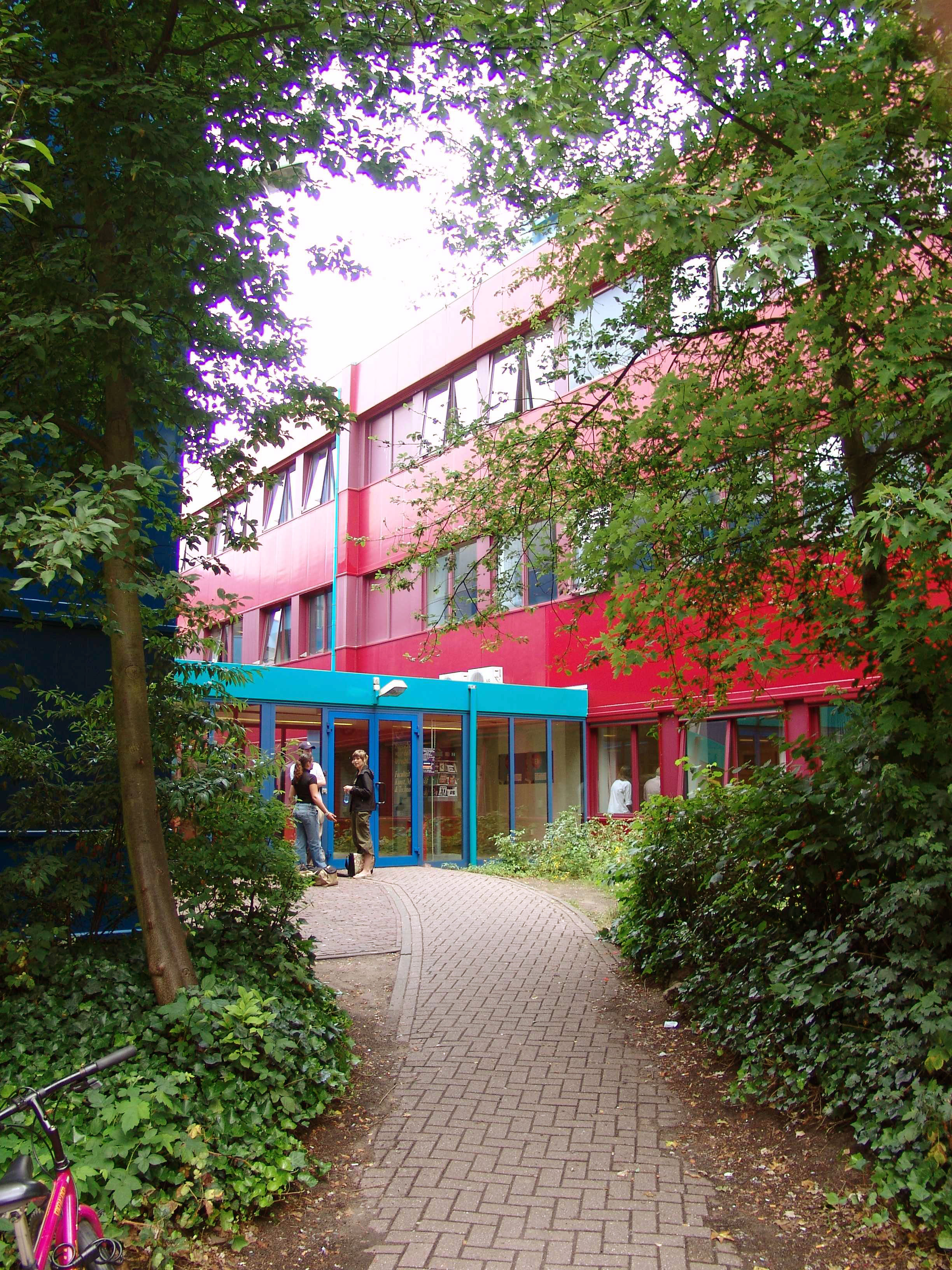
Entrance of the department in Hilversum

The institution has 680 teachers and staff members. HKU University of the Arts Utrecht cooperates with the Utrecht University at many levels.

HKU University of the Arts Utrecht offers preparatory courses, bachelor's and master's programmes and research degrees in fine art, design, music, theatre, media, games and arts management. With more than 3,900 students, HKU University of the Arts Utrecht is one of the largest art and culture-oriented institutes in Europe.

HKU University of the Arts Utrecht is internationally oriented and involved in numerous international programmes and projects. HKU University of the Arts Utrecht maintains contact with almost 200 educational institutions abroad for the purpose of exchanging lecturers, students and projects. Almost 20% of the students come from outside the Netherlands. Foreign students can attend HKU University of the Arts Utrecht as a regular student, an exchange student in programmes such as Socrates/Erasmus, a bilateral exchange programme or as an MA, MPhil or Ph.D. student. Since 1999, HKU University of the Arts Utrecht is an accredited institution of the Open University.

== Faculty of Music ==
The Faculty of Music was a formed in 1987 as a result of the merger of the Utrecht Conservatory of Music, the Netherlands Institute for Church Music and the Netherlands Carillon School of Amersfoort.

=== Carillon School ===
The Netherlands Carillon School, founded in Amersfoort in 1953, is a Dutch school teaching carillon playing. Since its foundation, more than 250 students from eleven countries have studied there. They now preside over most of the 182 carillons in the Netherlands, and occupy positions in many other parts of the world. In 1985 the school became part of the Utrecht School of the Arts, Faculty of Music.

Each student of the Netherlands Carillon School can follow study programmes offered by the other schools.

== Bachelor's programs ==
HKU University of the Arts Utrecht offers bachelor courses and pathways in fine art, design, music, theatre, media, games and interaction, arts education and arts management.

Courses in English:

- Bachelor of Fine Arts (partially)
- Bachelor of Music

Courses in Dutch:

- Bachelor of Arts and Economics
- Bachelor of Creative Media and Game Technologies
- Bachelor of Design
- Bachelor of Education
- Bachelor of Theatre

Courses in English for Exchange students:

- HKU University of the Arts Utrecht offers study programmes for international students, who wish to study 1 or 2 semesters abroad.

== Master programs ==
Master's programmes and pathways in English:

- Master of Fine Arts in Scenography
- Master of Arts in Fine Art
- Master of Music, Performance
- Master of Music, Music Design

Courses in Dutch:

- Master of Education in Arts
- Master Interior Architecture
- Master Crossover Creativity

== Other higher education institutions in Utrecht ==
- Utrecht University of Applied Sciences (HU — Hogeschool Utrecht)
- Utrecht University (Universiteit Utrecht)
- University College Utrecht affiliated with Utrecht University

== Notable alumni ==
- Bas van Abel
- Najib Amhali
- Pascal van Assendelft
- Barry Atsma
- Henze Boekhout
- Erik-Jan de Boer
- Floortje Dessing
- Diddo
- Jetske van den Elsen
- Martijn Fischer
- Wouter Hamel
- Rob Hornstra
- Janine Jansen
- Annet van Egmond
- Emmy Verhey
- Lies Visschedijk
- Herman Witkam

== See also ==
- Higher Professional Education
- Utrecht Network
