= Pleonexia =

Greek concept of greed

Pleonexia, sometimes called pleonexy, originating from the Greek πλεονεξία, is a philosophical concept which roughly corresponds to greed, covetousness, or avarice, and is strictly defined as "the insatiable desire to have what rightfully belongs to others."

== Classical Greek concepts of pleonexia ==
Classical Greek philosophers such as Plato related pleonexia to justice.

Thrasymachus, in Book I of The Republic, presents pleonexia as a natural state, upon which justice is an unnatural restraint.

In discussing the philosophy of Aristotle, who insisted in his Nicomachean Ethics that all specifically unjust actions are motivated by pleonexia, Kraut discusses pleonexia and equates it to epichairekakia, the Greek version of schadenfreude, stating that inherent in pleonexia is the appeal of acting unjustly at the expense of others. Young, however argues that the simple involvement of unfairness in the desire for gaining ever more is what defines pleonexia, rather than that the desire itself be for gaining ever more in a manner that is specifically unfair.

Thomas Hobbes includes it as a concept of natural law in Leviathan:

If in this case, at the making of Peace, men require for themselves, that which they would not have to be granted to others, they do contrary to the precedent law, that commandeth the acknowledgement of naturall equalitie, and therefore also against the law of Nature. The observers of this law, are those we call Modest, and the breakers Arrogant Men. The Greeks call the violation of this law πλεονεξία; that is, a desire of more than their share.

== Christian concepts of pleonexia ==
Pleonexia, being mentioned in the New Testament in Colossians 3 verses 1–11 and Luke 12 verses 13–21, has been the subject of commentary by Christian theologians.

William Barclay describes pleonexia as an "accursed love of having", which "will pursue its own interests with complete disregard for the rights of others, and even for the considerations of common humanity". He labels it an aggressive vice that operates in three spheres of life. In the material sphere, it involves "grasping at money and goods, regardless of honour and honesty". In the ethical sphere it is "the ambition which tramples on others to gain something which is not properly meant for it". In the moral sphere, it is "the unbridled lust which takes its pleasure where it has no right to take".
