= Henrik B. Andersen =

Danish sculptor

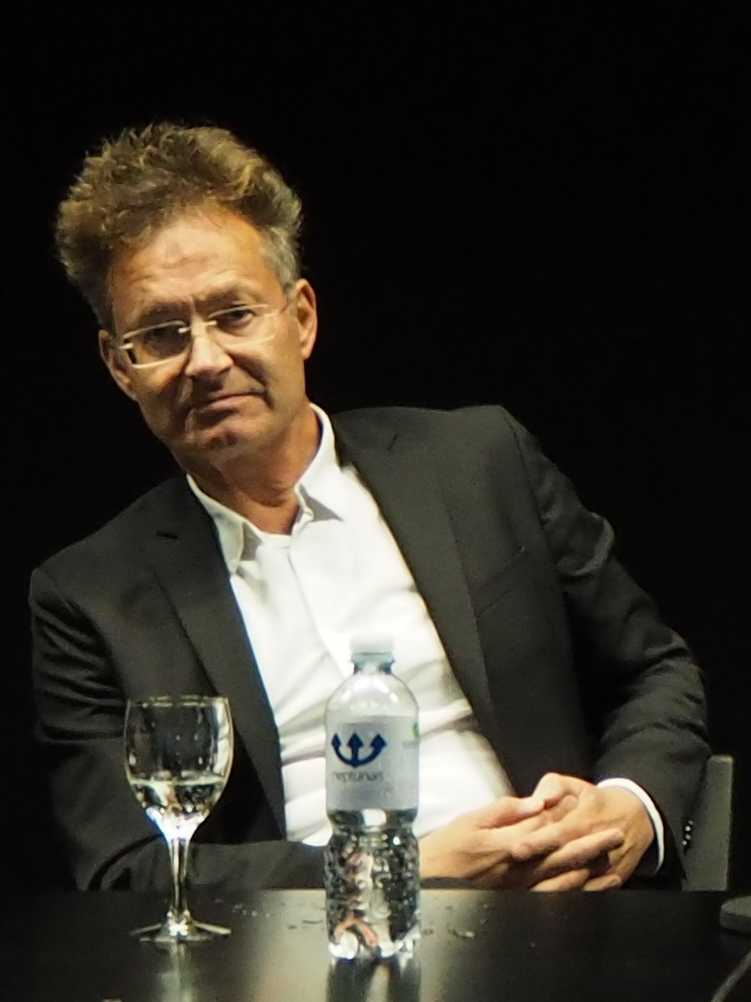
Henrik Bjørn Andersen at the presentation of book "Glory was at the fingertips", National Gallery of Art, Vilnius, 2016

Henrik Bjørn Andersen (born 13 May 1958) is a Danish sculptor. Since 2008, he has been a professor at the Vilnius Academy of Art in Lithuania.

== Biography ==
Born in Hornbæk in the north of Zealand, Andersen studied sculpture at the Royal Danish Academy of Fine Arts under Willy Ørskov and Hein Heinsen (1980–87). Based on Minimalism and Conceptual Art, his works combine classical art forms with Postmodernism. Until the late 1980s, his creations consisted of several parts, from the geometric to the abstract. Materials included plaster and plastics such as polyester. Andersen has not produced many sculptures but his large bronze works Ostranenie (1989) and Farvel til P. klassicisme (1991) combine classical sculpture with animals and the human body, forming a symbiosis of the rational and irrational.

From 1999 to 2008, Andersen was a professor at the sculpture school of the Royal Danish Academy. He has since been a professor in the Department of Concept, Temporality and Space at the Vilnius Academy of Arts. He has also taught at the National Film School of Denmark.

== Awards ==
In 2008, Andersen was awarded the Eckersberg Medal.

== Literature ==
- Andersen, Henrik B. (2008). Billedhuggerskolen i Frederiksholms Kanal. Slots- og Ejendomsstyrelsen, Det Kongelige Danske Kunstakademis Billedkunstskoler. ISBN 978-87-7945-057-8.
