= University of Kentucky College of Fine Arts =

College of Fine Arts of the University of Kentucky in Lexington, KY, USA

Coordinates: 38.036994°N 84.501885°W

- Type: Public
- Dean: Mark Shanda
- Location: Lexington, KY, USA
- Website: finearts.uky.edu

The University of Kentucky College of Fine Arts is composed of four academic units: the School of Art and Visual Studies, the Department of Arts Administration, the School of Music, and the Department of Theatre and Dance. The Singletary Center for the Arts, the college's performing arts facility, supports the School of Music. The University of Kentucky Art Museum has a collection of more than 4,500 objects.

Dean Mark Shanda is a member of the International Council of Fine Arts Deans and the United States Institute for Theatre Technology.

== Departments and degree programs ==
Art & Visual Studies

- BA in Art Education
- BA in Art History and Visual Studies
- BA in Art Studio
- BFA in Art Studio
- BS in Digital Media Design
- MA in Art History and Visual Studies
- MA in Art Education
- MFA in Art Studio
- MFA in Curatorial Studies

Music

Undergraduate:

- BM in Music Education
- BM in Performance
- BA in Music

Graduate:

- MA in Musicology & Ethnomusicology
- MA in Music Theory
- MM in Music Therapy
- MM in Composition
- MM in Performance
- MM in Conducting
- MM in Sacred Music
- MM in Music Education
- PhD in Musicology & Ethnomusicology
- PhD in Music Education
- PhD in Music Theory
- DMA in Conducting
- DMA in Performance
- DMA in Composition
- Certificate in Music Theory Pedagogy
- Graduate Certificate in Orff Schulwerk

Theatre & Dance

- BA in Theatre
- BA in Dance
- Musical Theatre Certificate

Arts Administration

- BA in Arts Administration
- MA in Arts Administration
- PhD in Arts Administration
- Certificate in Fundraising and Development

Minors

- Art History
- Art Studio
- Digital Media Design
- Photography
- Visual Studies
- Music Theory and History
- Music Performance (audition required)
- Theatre
- Dance
- Interdisciplinary Minor in the Arts

== Deans of the college ==
1. J. Robert Wills, 1978–1982
2. Richard Domek, 1982–1992
3. Rhoda-Gale Pollack, 1992–1998
4. Robert Shay, 1998–2010
5. Michael S. Tick, 2010–2016
6. David Sogin (Interim) 2016–2017
7. Mark Shanda, 2017–present
