= University of Florida College of the Arts =

Fine arts school of the University of Florida

Coordinates: 29.648199°N 82.340572°W

College of the Arts
- Former name: College of Fine Arts
- Type: Art school
- Established: 1975
- Affiliations: University of Florida
- Dean: Jennifer Setlow (Interim)
- Students: 1,220
- Location: Gainesville, Florida, United States
- Website: www.arts.ufl.edu

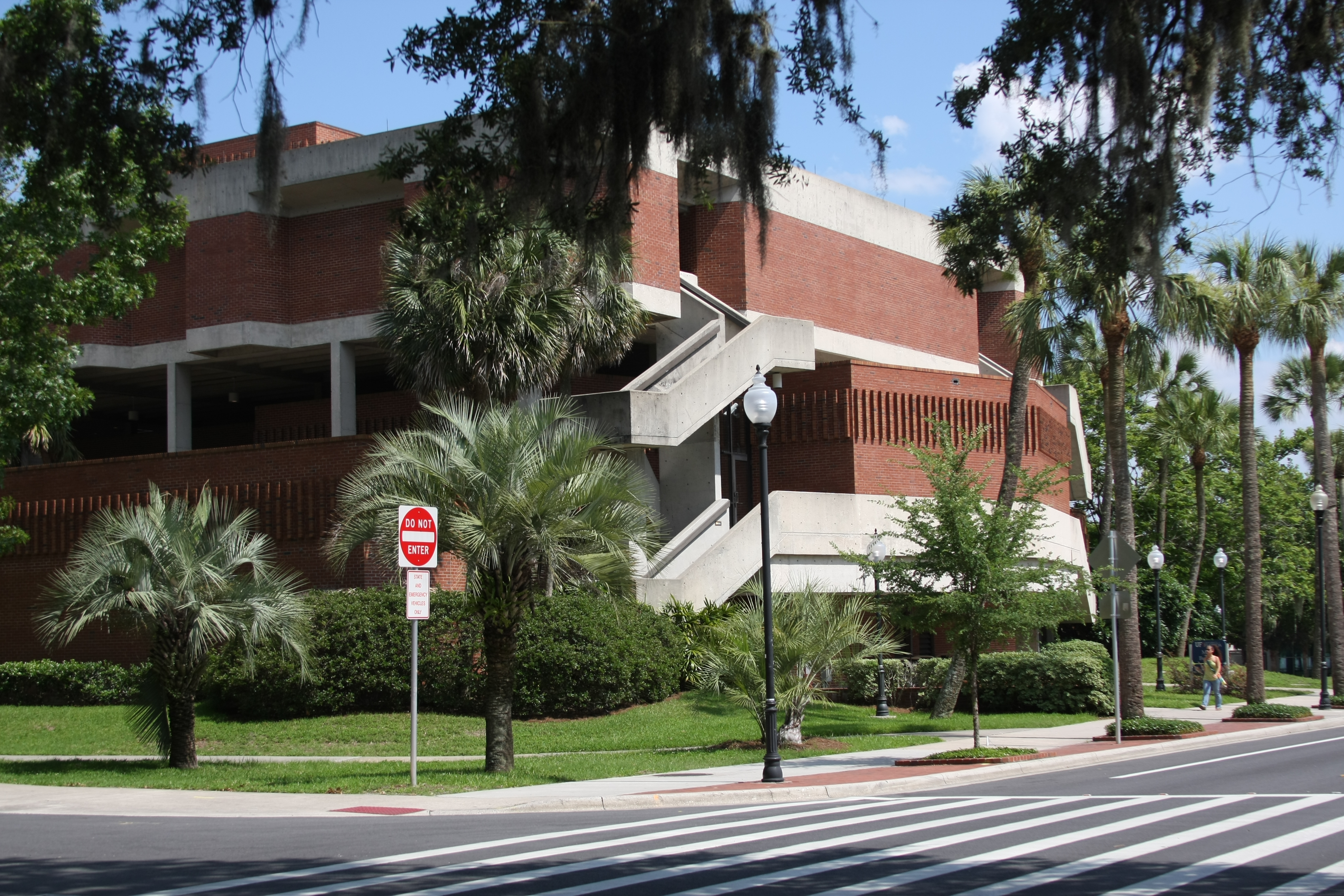
Music Building

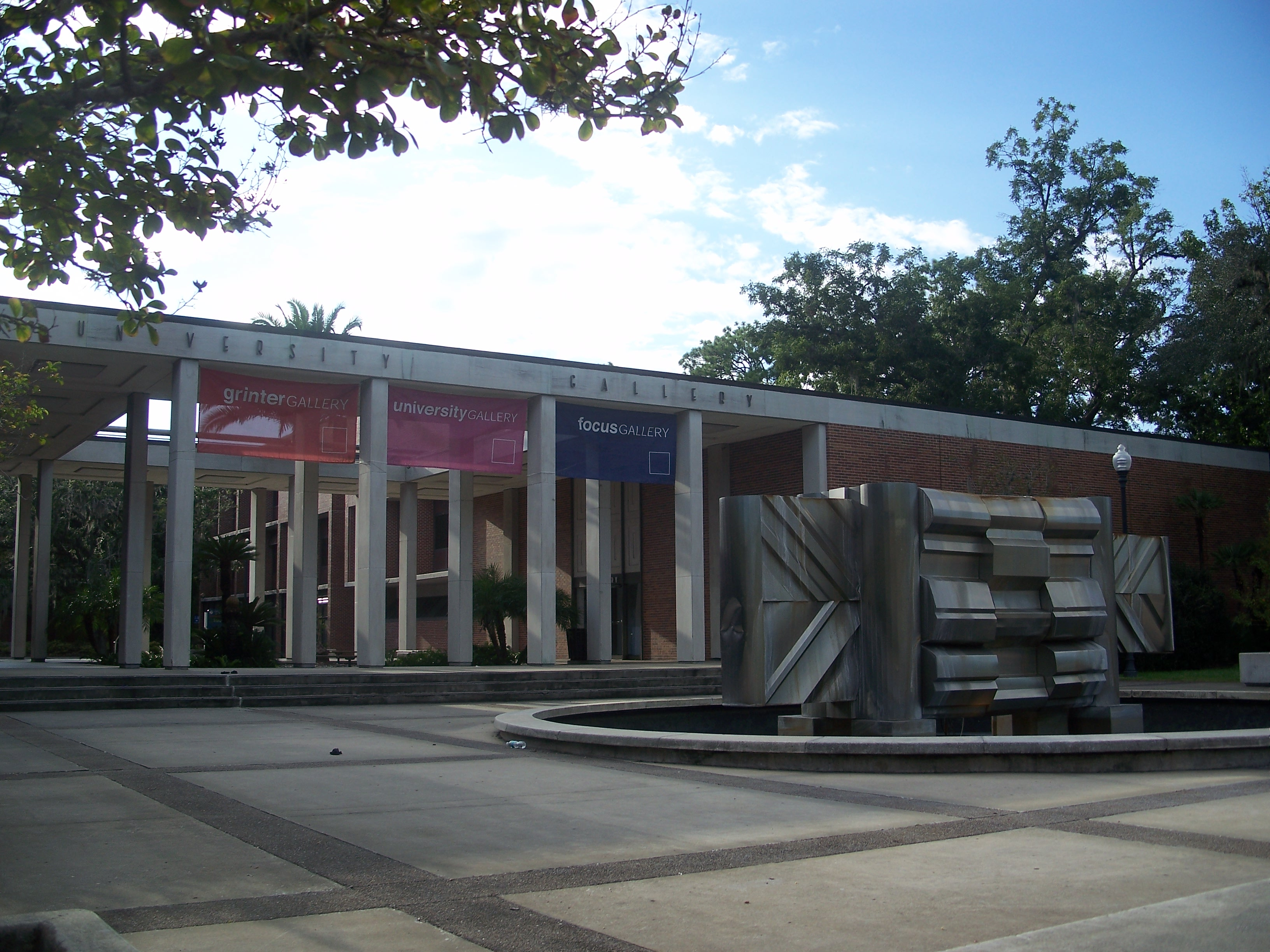
The College of Fine Arts

The University of Florida College of the Arts is the fine arts college of the University of Florida. It was established in 1975, and is located on the university's Gainesville, Florida campus. As of 2024 the interim dean was Jennifer Setlow.

Previously named the College of Fine Arts, the college's name was changed on May 12, 2014.

The College of the Arts, one of 16 colleges and more than 150 research centers and institutes at the University of Florida, offers bachelor's, master's and Ph.D. degree programs in its three schools — the School of Art and Art History, School of Music, and School of Theatre and Dance. The college is also the home to the Center for Arts in Medicine, Center for World Arts, Digital Worlds Institute, University Galleries and the New World School of the Arts in Miami. It has more than 100 faculty members and more than 1,220 students. The college hosts more than 300 performances, exhibitions and events each year. Faculty and students also exhibit and perform at other local, national and international venues.

== Composition ==
The college is composed of three schools:

- School of Art and Art History
  - Director: Elizabeth Ross
- School of Music
  - Director: Kevin Robert Orr
- School of Theatre and Dance
  - Director: Tiza Garland

Also included are

- Center for Arts in Medicine
  - Director: Ferol Carytsas
  - Research Director: Dr. Jill Sonke
- Center for Arts, Migration, and Entrepreneurship
  - Director: Oṣubi Craig
- Digital Worlds Institute
  - Director: Tim Difato
- University Galleries: Gary R. Libby University Gallery, Grinter Gallery, Gary R. Libby Focus Gallery
  - Director + Curator: Jesús Fuenmayor
- New World School of the Arts (Miami)

== Facilities ==
The college holds classes mainly in the Fine Arts Buildings (lettered A through D) and in the Music Building. There is also a warehouse off-campus located on University Avenue used for shows and as the classroom for the Workshop for Art Research and Practices (WARP), an "Art Bootcamp" for freshmen. In 2004, the Nadine McGuire Theatre and Dance Pavilion became the home for School of Theatre + Dance faculty and students.

The college also extends in the University Galleries—the Gary R. Libby University Gallery, Grinter Gallery, Gary R. Libby Focus Gallery, and has collections in the Architecture and Fine Arts Library, Music Library, Belknap Collection for the Performing Arts (West), Education Library (Norman Hall), and the Visual Resources Center.

The School of Music and the School of Theater and Dance regularly use the University Auditorium for performances, and the playing of the carillon in Century Tower is under the purview of the School of Music, as well.

== Research ==
The College of the Arts received $1.1 million in annual research revenue in 2024.

== See also ==
- Theatre Strike Force
- Roy C. Craven, founding director of the University Gallery at UF
- University of Florida Center for Arts in Medicine
