= Yvette Brackman =

Danish-American artist

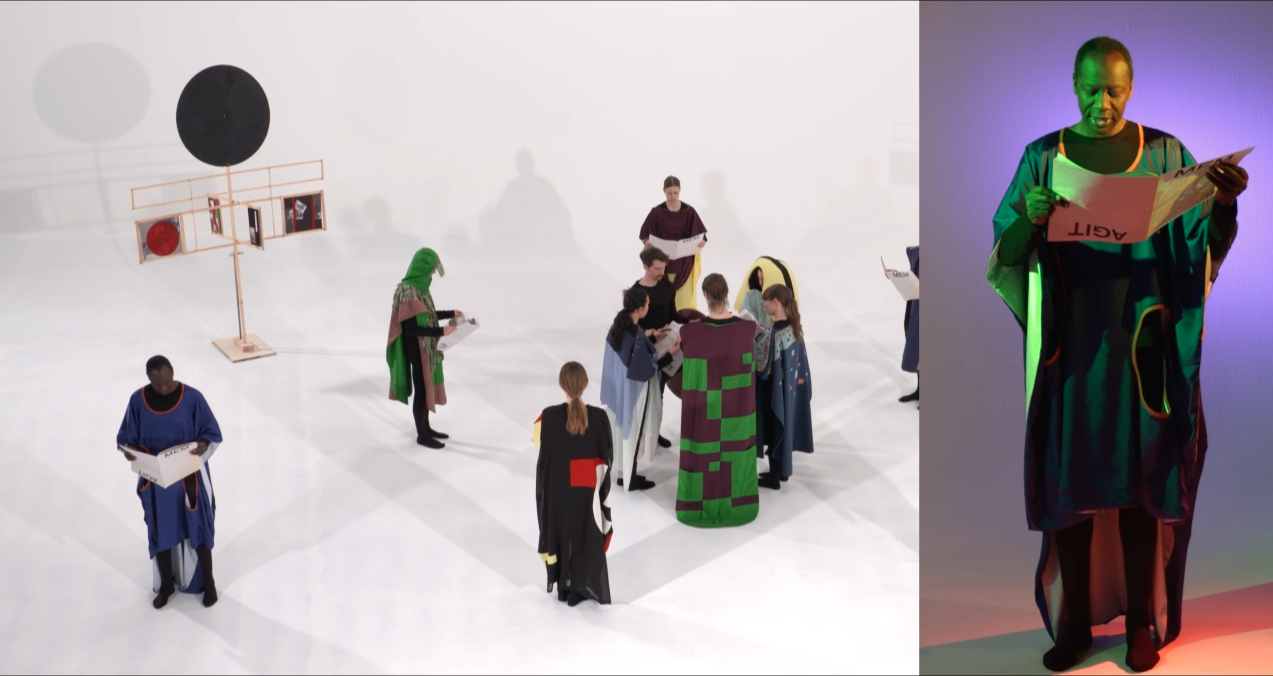
- Video still from AGIT MEM (2016). Permanent collection: SMK – The National Gallery of Denmark.
- Born: 1967 (age 58–59); New York City, New York, U.S.
- Education: School of the Art Institute of Chicago; University of Illinois Chicago
- Known for: Conceptual art, installation, performance, video, and writing
- Website: Official website

Yvette Brackman (born 1967) is a Danish-American visual artist, curator, and writer. Born in New York City, she lives and works in Copenhagen. She is known for research-driven installations and performative projects that transform materials—including textiles, sculptural assemblage, and reworked archival objects—into environments activated through staged actions and collaboration. Her work addresses themes of displacement, exile, adaptability, and the relationship between personal memory and broader historical narratives.

== Education ==
Brackman received a Bachelor of Fine Arts degree from the School of the Art Institute of Chicago and completed graduate studies at the University of Illinois Chicago.

== Early career (1991–2000) ==
Brackman began exhibiting in Chicago in the early 1990s. Her work was included in the exhibition Profiles at Randolph Street Gallery in 1994. In 1997, she exhibited with artist Mary Beth Edelson in Female Perversion at Halle für Kunst (Berlin), curated by Heike Munder.

In New York, Brackman participated in Greene Naftali’s two-part exhibition Super Freaks – Post Pop & the New Generation (1998). Exhibition records also list a solo exhibition at Up & Co. (New York) in 1998.

== Career ==
From 2000 to 2007, Brackman was a professor and head of the School of Walls and Space at the Royal Danish Academy of Fine Arts.

From 2020 to 2024, she held a Mads Øvlisen postdoctoral fellowship in practice-based research at SMK – The National Gallery of Denmark, supported by the Novo Nordisk Foundation. The fellowship concluded in autumn 2024.

== Selected exhibitions ==
- Land (SMK – Statens Museum for Kunst, X-rummet, Copenhagen; 13 October 2001 – 6 January 2002).
- Approaching Journey (part of Liverpool Biennial 2012: City States, LJMU Copperas Hill Building, Liverpool; 15 September – 25 November 2012).
- AGIT FLIGHT (Overgaden – Institute of Contemporary Art, Copenhagen, 2014).
- AGIT MEM (installation of video work, SMK – Statens Museum for Kunst, Copenhagen, 2016).
- Underneath Father America’s Closed Eyelids Lies Russia (Vox Populi Gallery, Philadelphia; 3 March – 23 April 2017).
- I’m an Archive (Heirloom – Center for Art and Archives, Copenhagen, 2017).
- Salon des Refusés (SMK – Statens Museum for Kunst, Copenhagen; 11 April – 8 September 2024).

== Research ==
Brackman’s practice includes long-term, institutionally based research combining artistic practice with archival inquiry and material analysis.

From 2020 to 2024, she conducted practice-based research at SMK – The National Gallery of Denmark through a Mads Øvlisen postdoctoral fellowship.

Beginning in 2025, Brackman continues her affiliation with SMK through a research project (2025–2028) focused on the nineteenth-century painting Marsk Stig’s Daughters by Geskel Saloman. The project forms part of SMK’s institutional research initiative reassessing Saloman’s work and its place within Danish art history.

== Writing and essays ==
Alongside her artistic practice, Brackman has published art criticism, essays, and reviews in international art magazines and edited volumes. In the late 1990s, her writing appeared in English-language art publications including *Frieze*, *New Art Examiner*, *Flash Art*, and *Time Out New York*, where she contributed reviews and critical texts engaging contemporary art and exhibition practices.

More recently, Brackman has been an active contributor to *Kunstkritikk*, a Nordic journal of contemporary art, where she has published essays and interviews reflecting on artistic practice, research, and institutional contexts.

== Public collections ==
Brackman's work is held in the public collection of SMK – The National Gallery of Denmark, including AGIT MEM (print edition) (2014) and Agit Mem (video installation) (2016).

Malmö Konstmuseum (Malmö Art Museum) has acquired work from Brackman's Moe Mir series.

KORO (Public Art Norway) lists Brackman's video work Anisya Sleeping (2001) in its collection records.

== Publications ==
- The Ecstasy of Limits. Gallery 400, University of Illinois Chicago, 1994.
- Imagined Communities. Krabbesholm Højskole, 2001.
- Land. Statens Museum for Kunst, 2001.
- The Suburban: The Early Years, 1999–2003. The Suburban, 2003.
- De intellektuelle i virkelighed: En interviewbog – Ti temaer i tiden. Jens Kerte. Aschehoug, 2003.
- Udsigt: Feministiske strategier i dansk billedkunst. Informations Forlag, 2004.
- The Making of Technically Sweet. Plum Velvet, 2008.
- Russ, Sabine (ed.). Yvette Brackman: Systems and Scenarios. Zurich: JRP Ringier, 2012.
- Anthropology and Art Practice. Edited by Arndt Schneider and Christopher Wright. Bloomsbury Academic, 2013.
- 100 × Forår: Den Frie Udstillingsbygning 1914–2014. Den Frie Udstillingsbygning, 2014.
- Practicable: From Participation to Interaction in Contemporary Art. Edited by Samuel Bianchini and Erik Verhagen. MIT Press, 2016.
- BAT: Bridging Art and Text. Hurricane / Printed Matter, 2017.
- Berørt. Maria Kjær Themsen. Strandberg Publishing / Den Frie, 2020.
