= Funen Art Academy =

Art school in Odense, Denmark

Coordinates: 55.3957°N 10.3801°E

Funen Art Academy (Danish: Det Fynske Kunstakademi) is an independent, nationally recognized educational institution located in central Odense, Denmark offering a 5-year programme in contemporary visual arts.

The academy is funded jointly by the Danish Ministry of Culture, the municipality of Odense, and private foundations and sponsors.

== See also ==
- Jutland Art Academy
