= Bunurong Marine National Park =

Protected area in Victoria, Australia

- IUCN category II (national park)
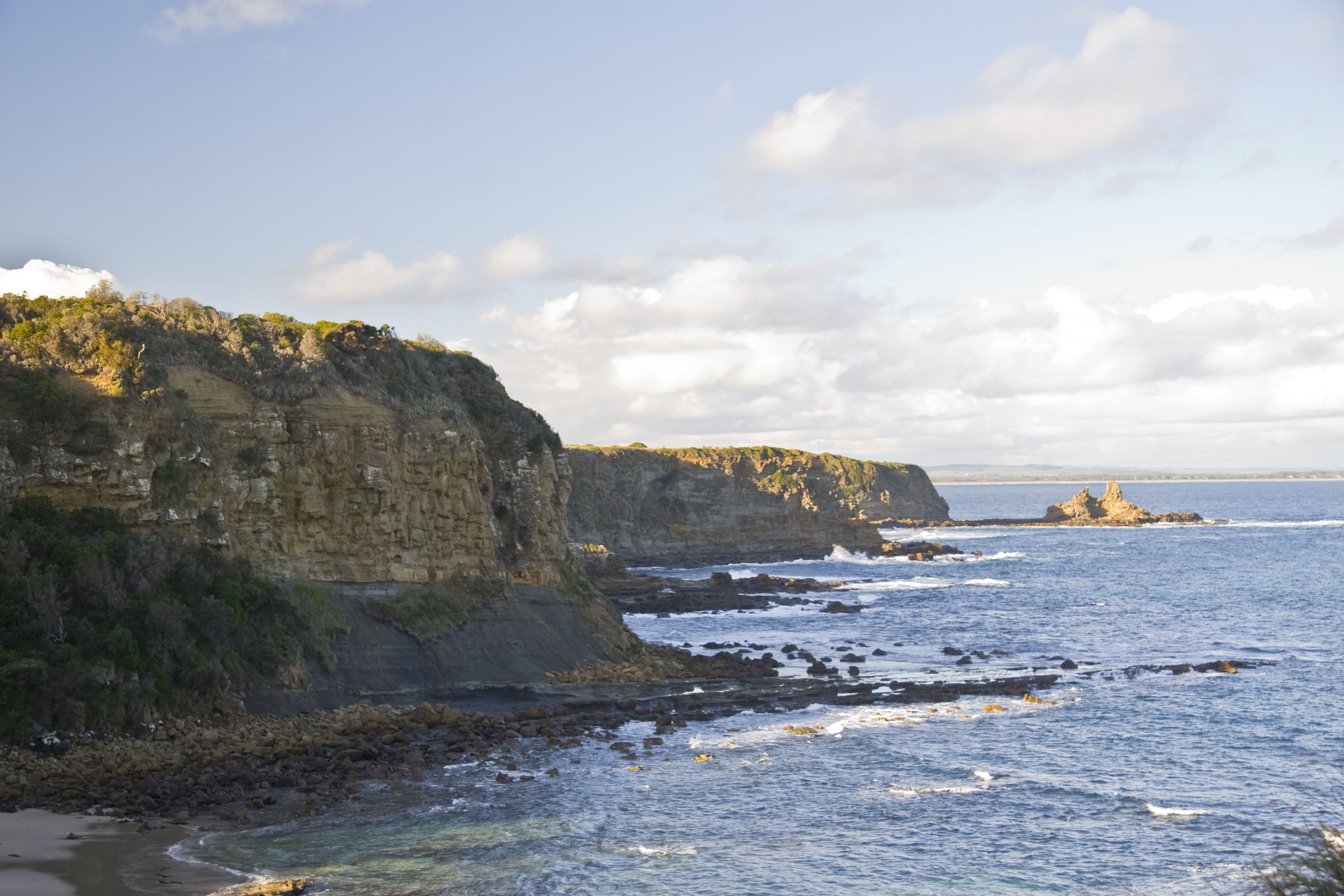
- A cliff at Cape Paterson, located adjacent to the marine park.

- Location within Victoria
- Location: Victoria
- Nearest city: Cape Paterson
- Coordinates: 38°41′28″S 145°39′22″E
- Area: 21 km^{2} (8.1 sq mi)
- Established: 16 November 2002
- Visitors: circa 250,000 (in 2005)
- Governing body: Parks Victoria
- Website: http://parkweb.vic.gov.au/explore/parks/bunurong-marine-national-park

The Bunurong Marine National Park (/ˈbʌnərɒŋ/) is a protected marine national park located off the coast of Cape Paterson in the South Gippsland region of Victoria, Australia. The 2,100-hectare (5,200-acre) marine national park is located about 6 kilometres (3.7 mi) southwest of Inverloch and about 5 kilometres (3.1 mi) off the coastline. The coastal waters protect a range of habitats including intertidal reefs, subtidal rocky reefs, algal gardens and seagrass beds. The waters are cool, akin to Victoria’s central and western coasts. However, they are relatively protected from south-westerly swells due to the location of far away King Island, Tasmania.

The Bunurong Marine National Park is an outstretching middle section of the Bunurong Marine Park. Both parks draw their name from the Australian Aboriginal Bunurong people who are the traditional owners of the land and water in the region.

== Etymology ==
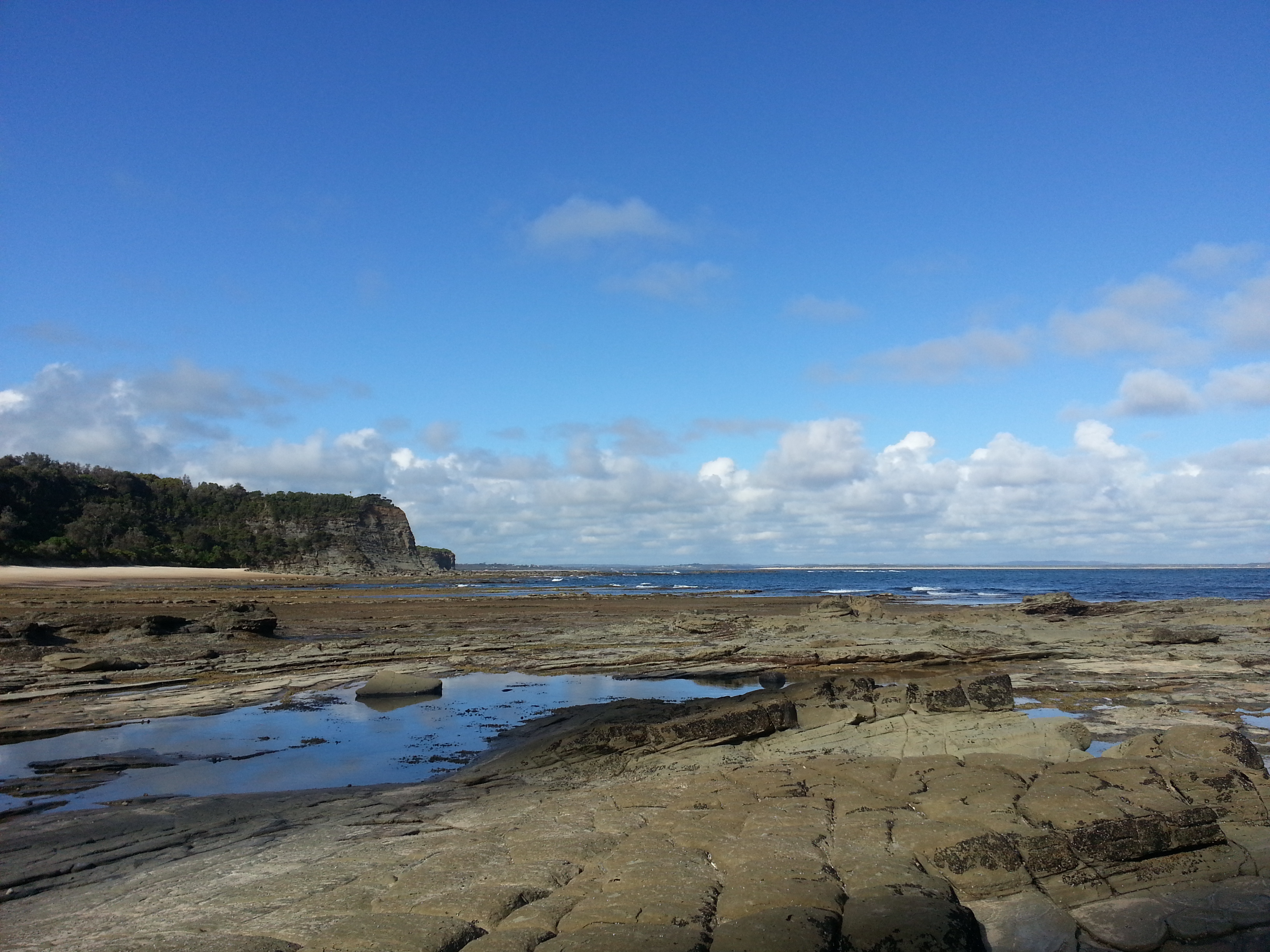
The Caves Beach reef, looking out towards the marine national park.

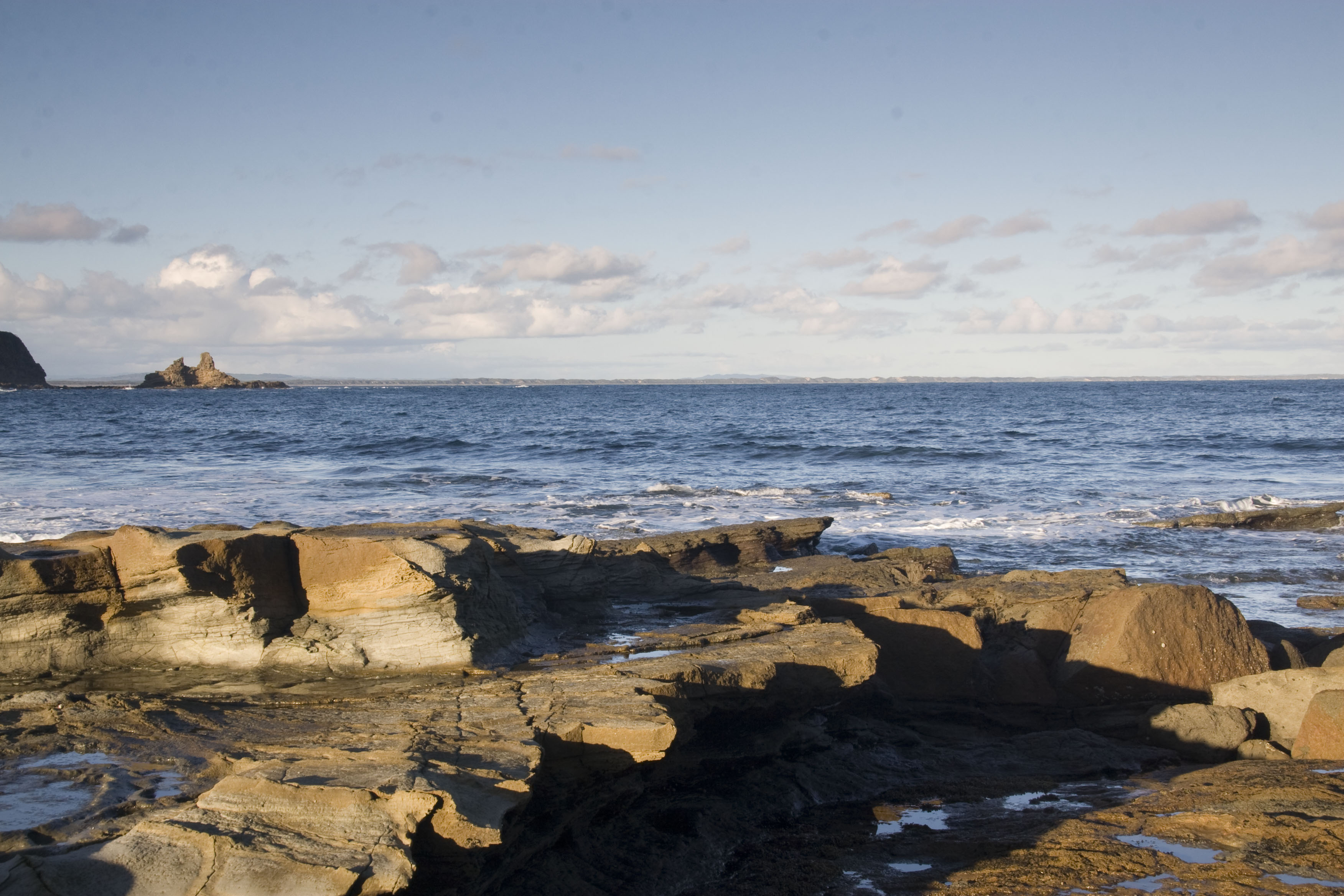
Shack Bay, with Eagles Nest in the distance, looking out towards the marine national park.

The Bunurong parks are named after the Bunurong Aboriginal people whom were custodians of this stretch of coast for thousands of years prior to white settlement. The Boakoolawal clan lived in the Kilcunda area south of the Bass River, and the Yowenjerre were west of the Tarwin River along what is now the Bunurong Marine and Coastal Parks near Wonthaggi. Middens containing charcoal and shellfish mark the location of their campsites along the coast.

== Features ==
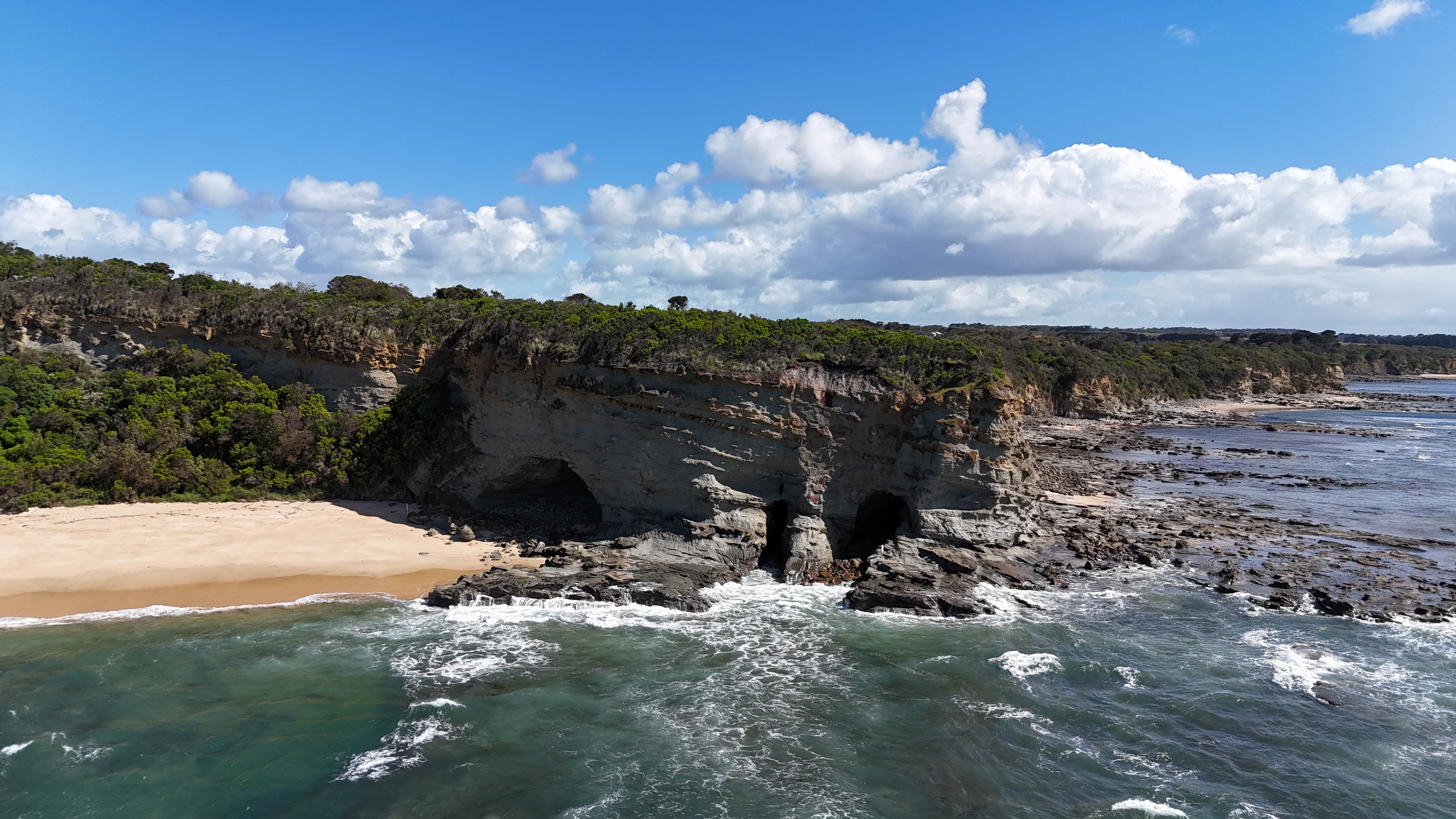
Inverloch Caves, from above. December 2025.

The principal features of the park are the striking rock formations including the large rock structure called Eagles Nest, located adjacent to the coastline at the eastern end of the marine national park. Eagles Nest also resembles the top half of a map of Australia. Other attractions include Flat Rocks where there are large rockpools for rockpool rambling and direct access from Cape Paterson-Inverloch Road. The Bunurong Marine National Park is accessed at many different points along this coast, a popular one being near Cape Paterson caravan park on Surf Beach Road as it has a modified rockpool for swimming. Direct and more difficult access to the marine national park is via car parks off Cape Paterson-Inverloch Road. Exploring, snorkelling and scuba diving are popular. There are boat launching facilities at Inverloch on Anderson Inlet.

Australia’s first dinosaur bone, the Cape Paterson Claw, was discovered in 1903 by William Ferguson at what is now Bunurong Marine Park at Eagles Nest beach in Inverloch. Since then more than 6,000 bones and teeth of small dinosaurs, mammals, birds, turtles and fish have been excavated. There is a dinosaur exhibition at the Inverloch Shell Museum.

=== Ecology ===
Together with the Bunurong Marine Park, the Bunurong Marine National Park supports many marine animals including seastars, featherstars, crabs, snails, 87 species of fish, whales and seals. It has the highest recorded diversity of intertidal and subtidal invertebrates in eastern Victoria. The range of seaweed species is large.

=== Restrictions ===
It is prohibited to kill or take any matter (i.e., catch fish, collect seashells or kill or take any sea or land creature, living or dead) from the Bunurong Marine National Park, but fishing (only with a rod) is permitted in the Bunurong Marine Park, which is located adjacent to the marine national park.

== See also ==
- Protected areas of Victoria
