= George Bass Coastal Walk =

Walking trail in Victoria, Australia

The George Bass Coastal Walk is a 7–8 kilometre one-way (14–16 km return) trail along the Bass Coast in Victoria, Australia, tracing the approximate route of explorer George Bass's 1797 voyage between San Remo and Kilcunda. The walk typically requires 2–3 hours one way or 4–6 hours return. Current safety information and updates on track conditions are available from the Bass Coast Shire and Parks Victoria websites.

A revegetation initiative near Kilcunda in 2005–2006 restored degraded land, with indigenous coastal species such as coastal tea tree, seaberry saltbush, coast banksia, coast wattle and syrup paperbark planted to support native ecology along the track. Looking ahead, the Victorian Government and Parks Victoria have announced plans to extend the walk to Inverloch, integrate camping opportunities, and consult with stakeholders and Traditional Owners to determine a suitable name for the expanded park. In 2023, Parks Victoria committed $8.33 million to Stage One upgrades, which will extend the trail to a total of 32 km, add new lookouts at Punchbowl, The Arch, and Eagles Nest, and improve trail links, signage, parking, and visitor information. Parks Victoria's stated long-term vision is to create a continuous coastal trail from The Punchbowl in San Remo to Cape Paterson.
