= Cape Paterson =

- Town
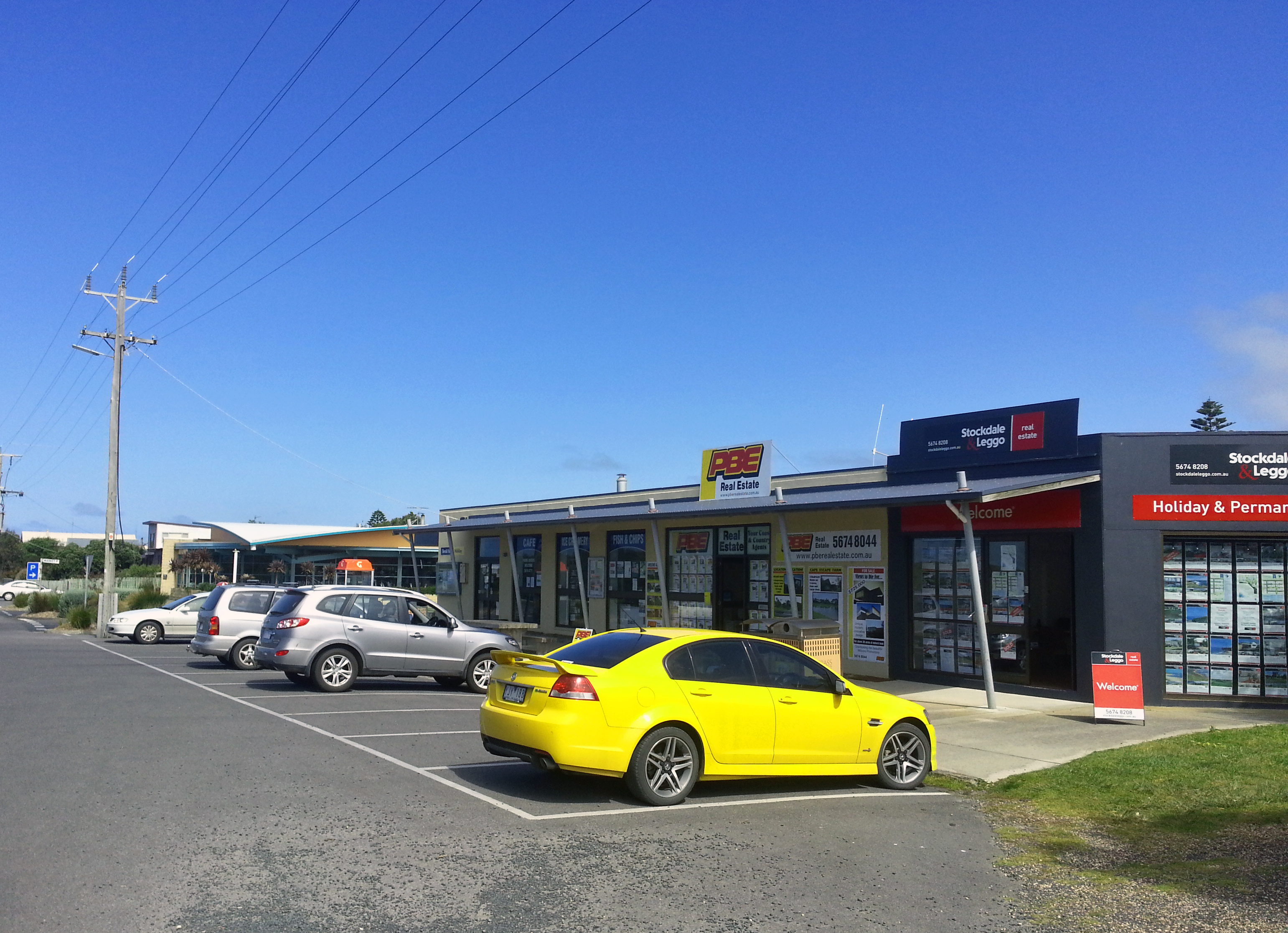
- Surf Beach Road

- Coordinates: 38.6717°S 145.6198°E
- Country: Australia
- State: Victoria
- LGA: Bass Coast Shire
- Location: 144 km (89 mi) SE of Melbourne; 8 km (5.0 mi) S of Wonthaggi; 13 km (8.1 mi) SW of Inverloch

Government
  - State electorate: Bass
  - Federal division: Monash

Population
  - Total: 891 (2016 census)
- Postcode: 3995
- Mean max temp: 18.7 °C (65.7 °F)
- Mean min temp: 9.5 °C (49.1 °F)
- Annual rainfall: 920.7 mm (36.25 in)
- Website: Cape Paterson

Cape Paterson (/ˈpætərsən/) is town located near the town of Wonthaggi, 132 kilometres (82 mi) south-east of Melbourne via the South Gippsland and Bass Highways, in the Bass Coast Shire of Gippsland, Victoria, Australia. Known originally for the discovery of coal by William Hovell in 1826, it is now extremely popular for its beaches and rockpool and at the 2011 census, it had a population of 718.

Cape Paterson has six beaches.

Cape Paterson was named by Lieut. James Grant in 1801 to honour explorer Lieut. Col. William Paterson, second in command of the Botany Bay (Sydney) battalion.

== Today ==
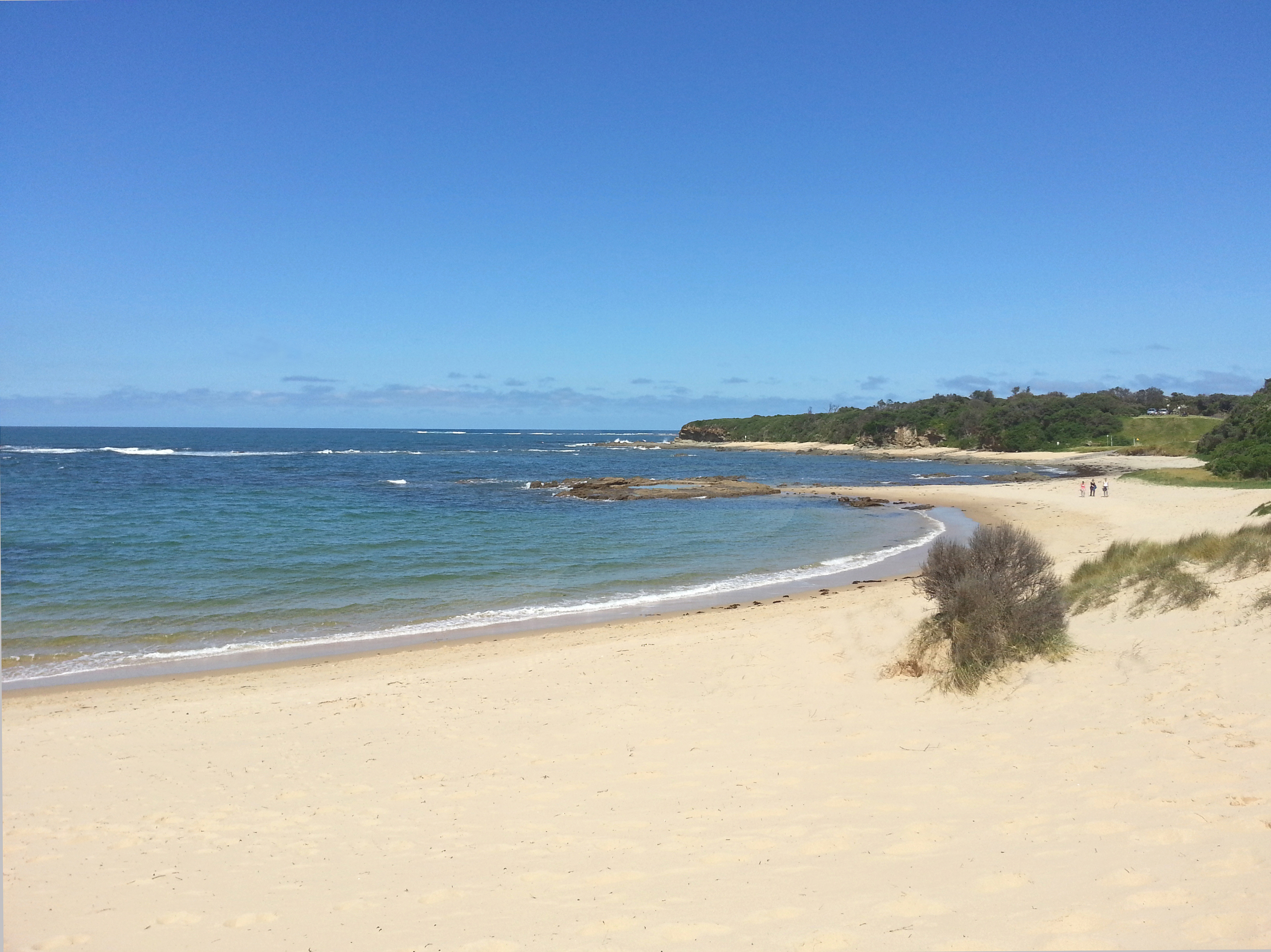
Swimming Rockpool, Surf Beach Road

Cape Paterson is a small town near the larger town of Wonthaggi. It is a popular tourist destination and has a large influx of campers during the summer months. Fishing is very popular there.

Cape Paterson has two local lifesaving clubs. The Wonthaggi Royal Life Saving Club and is located at the Bay Beach, and the Cape Paterson Surf Life Saving Club is located at First Surf Beach.

=== Rockpool ===
The Bay Beach near Cape Paterson caravan park on Surf Beach Road is popular as it has a modified rockpool for swimming. The rockpool was built by miners in the 1960s, at a time when the environment was less of a priority in Australia

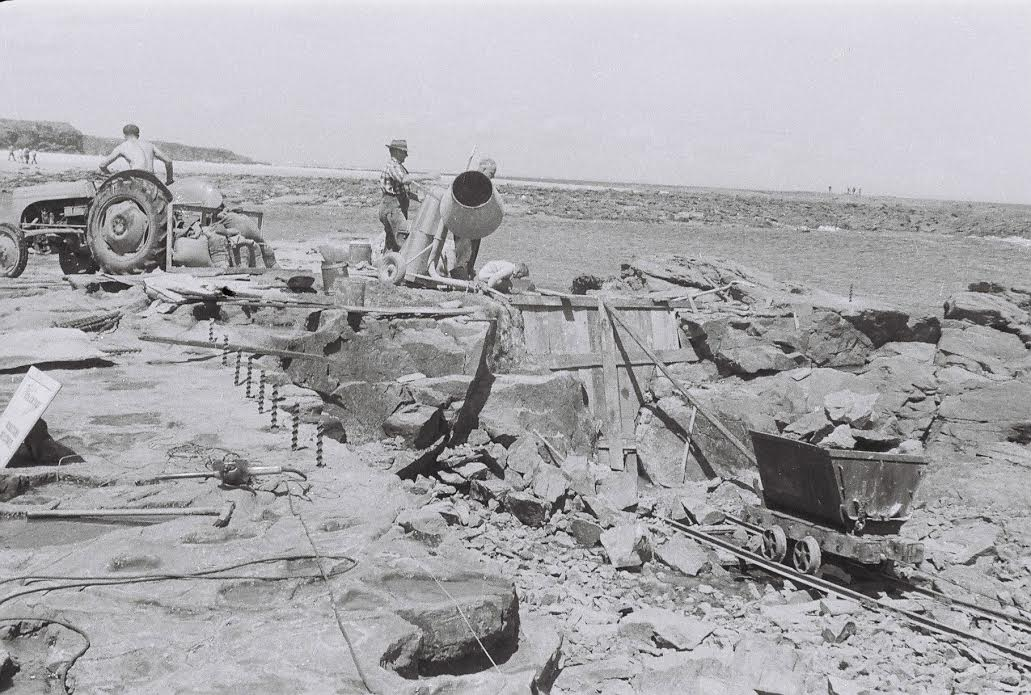
Miners Building The Rockpool

=== Coast ===
Cape Paterson has six beaches, namely "F" Break, 2nd Surf, 1st Surf, Safety Beach-Browns Bay, Undertow Bay and The Oaks.

=== Fishing ===
Cape Paterson is popular for surf and rock fishing. Undertow Bay is popular for catching Mullet and Salmon. Brown's Bay is good for Whiting and juvenile Snapper (Pinky). In the whole of the Bunurong Marine Park it is prohibited to take or kill reef fish such as Parrot Fish, Bluenose Wrasse and Leather Jackets. In the Bunurong Marine National Park all fishing is prohibited.

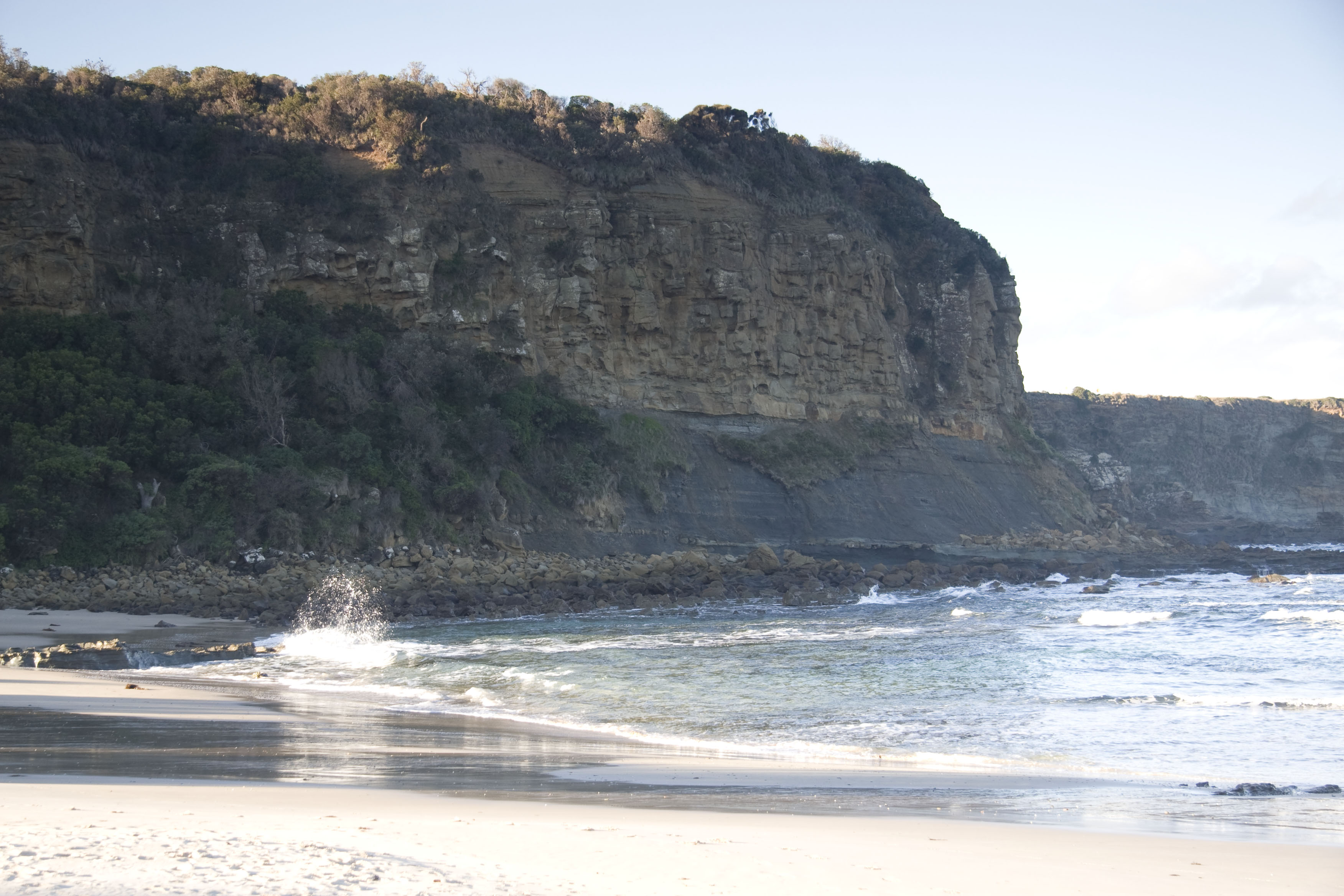
Cliffs

=== Museum ===
Australia’s first dinosaur bone, the Cape Paterson Claw, was discovered here in 1903 by William Ferguson nearby in what is now Eagles Nest, Bunurong Marine National Park, Inverloch. Today, the Dinosaur Dreaming fossil excavation at the Flat Rocks coastal site by Anderson Inlet attracts both Australian and international visitors. More than 6000 bones and teeth of small dinosaurs, mammals, birds, turtles and fish have been excavated. There is a Dinosaur exhibibition at the Inverloch Shell Museum

=== Bunurong Marine Parks ===
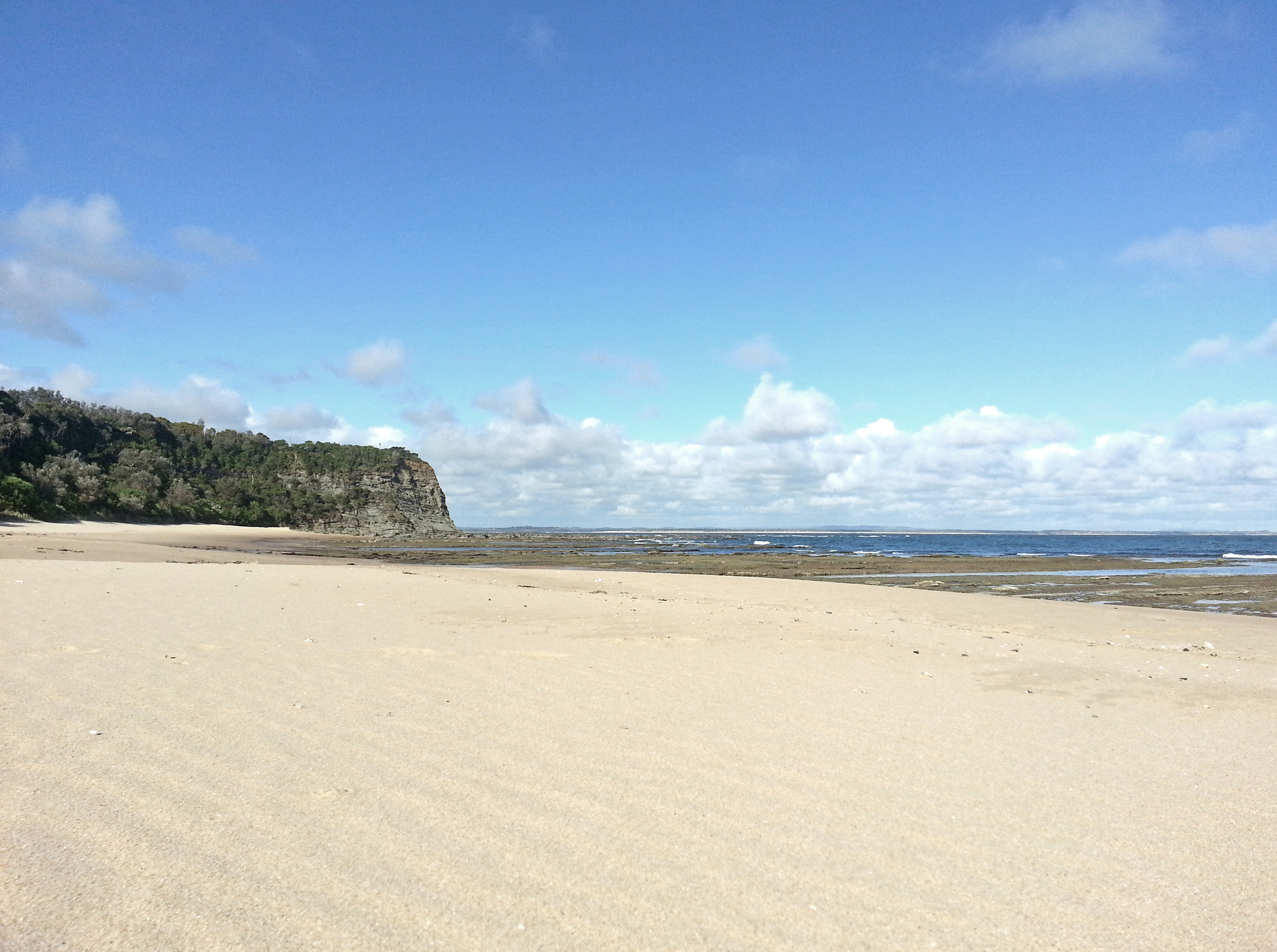
Bunurong Marine Park

Bunurong Marine Park is a 17 km marine and coastal park along the coast of Harmers Haven, Cape Paterson and Inverloch namely Coal Point to Wreck Creek.

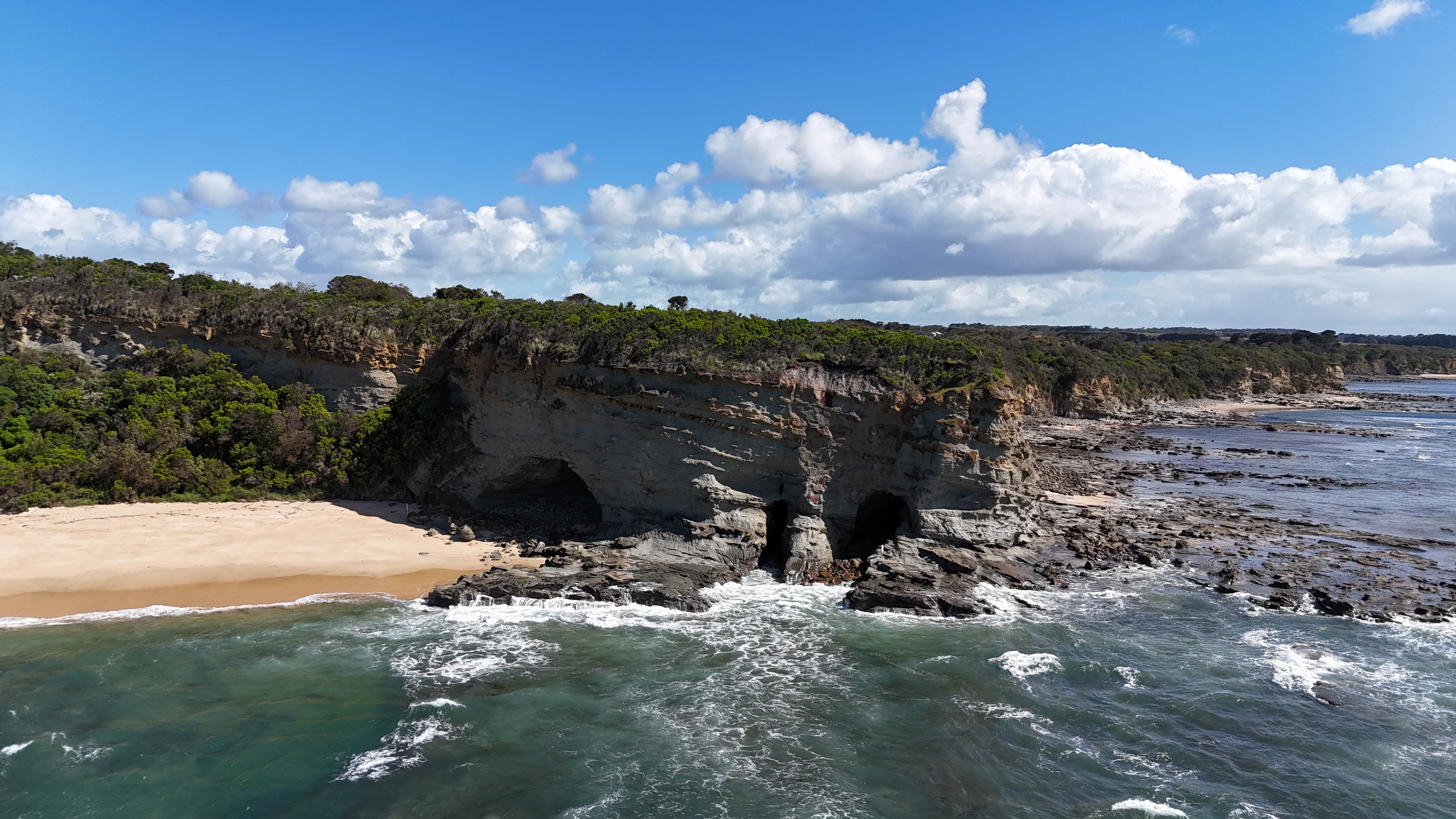
Inverloch Caves, from above. December 2025.

Bunurong Marine National Park is an outstretching middle section of Bunurong Marine Park. The National Park part is about 21 km^{2} or about 5 km in length along the coast and stretching from 2.5 km east of Cape Paterson eastwards to a point 6 km south-west of Inverloch, extending seawards for 3 nm to the limit of Victorian waters. The restricted zone/state park (Bunurong Marine National Park inside Bunurong Marine Park), on foot begins after Undertow Bay heading towards Inverloch from Cape Paterson. It is an area past Safety Beach and rockpool and past Undertow Bay beach namely The Oaks, Twin Reefs, Shack Bay and Eagles Nest. It ends at Wreck Creek and Inverloch. It is prohibited to kill or take any matter (i.e., catch fish, collect seashells or kill or take any sea or land creature, living or dead) from the smaller of the two parks; Bunurong Marine National Park.

Both parks are named after the Bunurong Aboriginal people.

Bunurong Marine Park is considered special due to the unusual set of environmental conditions. It supports many marine animals including sea stars, feather stars, crabs, snails, 87 species of fish, Whales and Seals. It has the highest recorded diversity of intertidal and subtidal invertebrates in eastern Victoria. The range of seaweed species is large.

Flat Rocks is a beach which has large rockpools for rockpooling/rambling and direct access from Cape Paterson-Inverloch Road. Bunurong Marine Park is seen and accessed at many different points along this coast, a popular one being near Cape Paterson caravan park on Surf Beach Road as it has a modified rockpool for swimming. The National Park is around to the left. Direct and more difficult access to the National Park is via car parks off Cape Paterson-Inverloch Road. Exploring, snorkelling and scuba diving are popular. There are boat launching facilities at Inverloch on Anderson Inlet.

Eagles Nest is a large rock structure adjacent to the coastline that resembles the top half of a map of Australia.

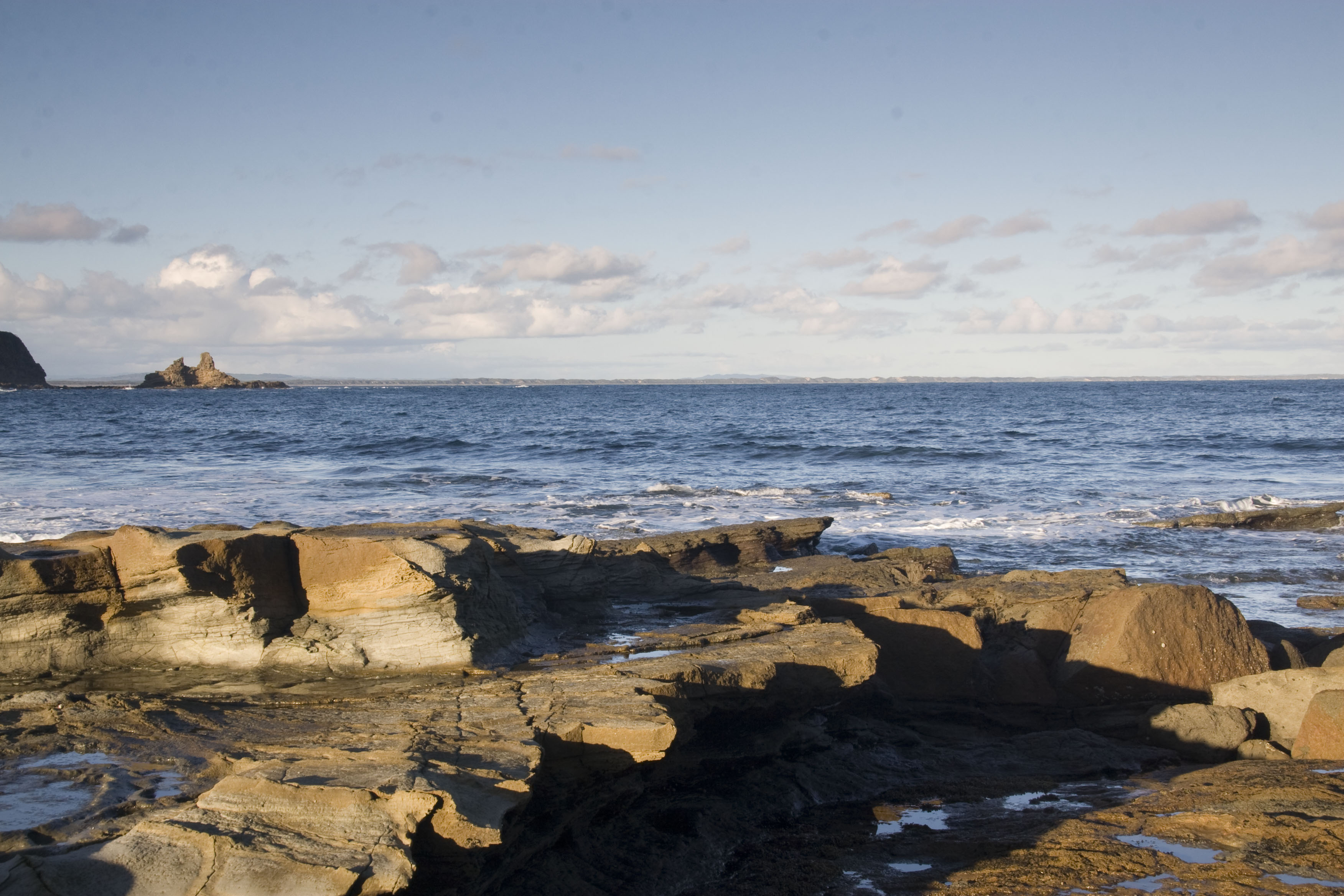
Bunurong Marine National Park With Eagles Nest In The Distance

== Climate ==
Cape Paterson's location on the north shore of Bass Strait gives it an oceanic climate, with the moderating effect of the ocean allowing a narrower temperature range throughout the year compared to other regions in Victoria. Average daily maximum temperatures range from 23.5 °C in summer to 13.5 in winter. Frost is rare, occurring on average 6 mornings a year.

== History ==
The Bunurong Aboriginal people used this stretch of coast for thousands of years prior to white occupation. The Boakoolawal clan lived in the Kilcunda area south of the Bass River, and the Yowenjerre were west of the Tarwin River along what is now the Bunurong Marine and Coastal Park. Middens containing charcoal and shellfish mark the location of their campsites along the coast.

Explorer William Hovell first discovered black coal in the cliffs at Cape Paterson in 1826. This and other sites were rediscovered 10 years later by Samuel Anderson who settled at Bass in 1835. In 1858, 2,000 tons of coal were hauled to the coast at Cape Paterson and taken by whaleboat to ships for transportation to Melbourne. Tram rails on the beach are reminders of further attempts to remove coal from the area later in the century, which still remain on the beach to the west of No 2 surf beach.

== Tourist Information ==
An in depth tourist information guide is available on the Visit Cape Paterson Website

== Education ==
There is one primary school in nearby Inverloch and three primary schools and one secondary college in nearby Wonthaggi. Also in Wonthaggi Chisholm TAFE, Bass Coast Specialist School, Bass Coast Adult Education Centre, University of the Third Age (U3A) retirees education centre, and Connecting Skills Australia (CSA) specialist developmental school, support and employment services/training. Plans are underway for a new tertiary education facility.

== Facilities ==
- Safety Beach and rockpool, Browns Bay, Surf Beach Road
- Playground - picnic areas, table, barbecue, near the caravan park, Surf Beach Road
- Coast; "F" Break, 2nd Surf, 1st Surf, Safety Beach Browns Bay, Undertow Bay, The Oaks, Twin Reefs, Shack Bay, Eagles Nest, The Caves and Flat Rocks
- Old foreshore public hall
- Wonthaggi Market - every 2nd Sunday in the centre of Wonthaggi
- Historic mine whistle sounds 12 noon every day in the centre of Wonthaggi - mine shaft tower, Apex Park, Murray Street, Wonthaggi
- Seashell/driftwood Collecting is NOT permitted on Cape Paterson coast from; ‘The Oaks’ to ‘Eagles Nest’ as this is the Bunurong Marine National Park. Access near Cape Paterson caravan park on Surf Beach Road. Left down the coast is Browns Bay, Undertow Bay, The Oaks, Twin Reefs, Shack Bay, Eagles Nest, Wreck Creek, The Caves, Flat Rocks
- Bunurong Marine Park - explore/snorkel, Surf Beach Road
- Bunurong Marine National Park - protected state park, explore/snorkel, Inverloch-Cape Paterson Road
- Wonthaggi Golf Course - 18 hole, par 72, ACR 70, easy walk, McKenzie Street, Wonthaggi
- Wonthaggi railway station museum - open Saturday mornings, Murray Street, Wonthaggi
- State Coal Mine - museum and tours, Garden Street, Wonthaggi
- Coal mine ruins - Number 5 Brace & the McBride tunnel entry, off West Area Road Wonthaggi and scattered around this and neighbouring towns
- Wonthaggi Hospital - Smoking ban, Graham Street, Wonthaggi
