= Margaret Clement (missing person) =

Australian missing person (1881–1952)

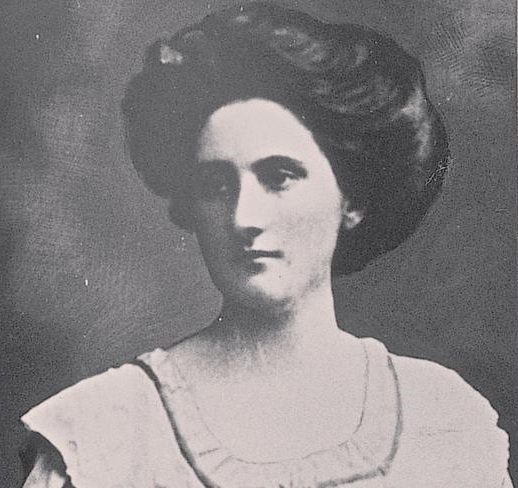
- The Lady of the Swamp as a wealthy young socialite
- Born: 8 March 1881; Seaspray, Victoria
- Disappeared: May 1952 (aged 71); Tullaree Homestead; Buffalo, Victoria
- Status: Declared dead in absentia 29 July 1954 (aged 73)
- Occupation: Reclusive pauper
- Known for: Unexplained disappearance

Margaret Clement (8 March 1881 – disappeared May 1952; declared legally dead 29 July 1954), popularly known as the Lady of the Swamp, was an Australian socialite, farmer, eccentric, recluse, and missing person.

Clement was a wealthy socialite who fell into destitution and squalor, before returning to the public eye following the death of her even more reclusive sister, who had to be recovered by foot from the dilapidated grand rural homestead they shared deep in a Gippsland swamp.

Two years later, shortly after ending a decades-long legal dispute and selling the homestead she had shared with her sister, Clement sensationally disappeared from the property without a trace.

As of 2025, her remains have not been recovered.

== Biography ==
=== Early years ===
Margaret Clement was born on 8 March 1881 at her family's home, Prospect Station in Seaspray, Victoria. She was the third daughter of Scottish immigrant Peter Clement, and his wife Jane Clement (née Thompson.) Peter Clement was an exceptionally wealthy man, rising from bullock driver to become a mine director and major landholder after accepting unwanted shares in a gold mine as payment. Clement's father married the 16-year-old daughter of a fellow bullock driver from the Walhalla goldfields in 1876. Clement's mother gave birth to six children by 1888.

Clement's father died suddenly at the family home in 1890, leaving an estate worth almost £100,000. Clement's mother, now a widow at only 30, received a small share of her husband's estate. This forced her to move with her six children from Prospect Station to the nearby town of Sale, and later to Melbourne. Once the children attained majority at the age of 21, they inherited the bulk of their late father's estate. Upon reaching this age in 1902, Margret – with her older sister Jeanie, and their mother, sailed to Europe where they visited several countries and were presented at court.

=== Adult life ===
Tullaree Homestead

In 1907, Clement purchased the property of Tullaree in Buffalo, Victoria as tenants in common with her sister Jeanie. Both sisters were to spend most of the remainder of the lives living in the remote, but opulent, homestead. Rumours that the property's original owner, Martin Wiberg, had hidden a stash of 5,000 gold sovereigns he stole from the mail steamer Avoca persisted throughout the sisters' ownership of Tullaree, despite thorough searches by previous owners. The property consisted of 2,000 acres of reclaimed swamp, with a 17-room homestead, outbuildings, and a staff of 11 to maintain the property and serve their many guests and frequent society functions. Younger brother Peter Clement managed the property for several years before marrying in 1912.

Peter Clement had been an effective and dedicated steward, running his sisters' property with diligence and honesty. Sadly, they lacked any understanding of farming or money management, and his less scrupulous successors in the role took advantage of them.

By the 1920s, the property was no longer a working farm, nor able to support the glamorous functions the sisters had previously hosted. Weeds spread across the property and the fences and drainage had become neglected. The stock was sold off, the staff were dismissed, and parts of the land were compulsorily acquired for the benefit of returned soldiers of the First Australian Imperial Force.

=== Financial woes ===
Clement and her sister began the process of selling a portion of the estate in 1922, hoping to stave off their creditors and return to their previously glamorous life. However, these plans were unsuccessful and many mortgages were taken out against the property between 1907 and 1930.

By 1927, attempts were being made to sell the property by the mortgage holders, however the sisters were able to establish a caveat on the property before the sale was registered that prevented their lawyer, Ross Smith, also the debtor who had bought Tullaree at auction, from claiming the title. This began decades of legal battles between Smith and the public litigator on behalf of the destitute sisters.

With the ownership of the property disputed, Tullaree fell further into disrepair. Following flooding, the brick homestead remained isolated as the paddocks returned to their natural swampy state. Clement and her sister were able to raise some money by auctioning trinkets and souvenirs of their travels to Europe and Japan, but they were soon again dependent on financial support from their mother to secure food and other supplies. Clement would wade through the swamp, which in some cases reached chest high, before walking into Buffalo to obtain supplies - a round trip of 11 kilometres.

The people of the local district had been accustomed to seeing Margaret Clement sitting primly in her carriage, wearing fine clothing and being driven by a uniformed groom in her younger days. Now she walked about in tattered old clothing with the aid of a stick, carrying her shoes through the water to the edge of her swamp. However, Clement remained proud. She politely declined offers of assistance from her neighbours, who continued to address her respectfully as "Miss Margaret" and ask after "Miss Jeanie", while being completely dependent on her mother to pay for groceries.

Following the 1937 death of their mother, the burden of supporting the eccentric sisters fell upon Clement's other siblings. Peter Clement died after shooting himself in the head in 1944, following years of seclusion after his service during the First World War. William Clement died three years later, leaving the support of the two elderly recluses in the hands of their remaining sister Anna, and her son Clem Carnaghan.

=== Death of Jeanie Clement ===
The plight of Clement and her sister sensationally came to the public's attention following Jeanie's death in 1950. After Jeanie's death, Clement made the trek out to the neighbouring Buckley's Farm and requested that the Buckleys place a phone call to arrange for an undertaker to retrieve her sister's remains. It took many hours for Mr Buckley to lead the undertaker, local police, and neighbouring farmers through the swamp to retrieve the body, and hours more to get back. The remains were returned to Wonthaggi at 11.30pm.

Victoria's major newspapers reported on the lives of the elderly recluses, with Clement receiving mountains of mail from people who remembered her as a society belle from decades before, former employees stunned to discover their old employer continued to live in the dilapidated old homestead, and opportunistic readers offering to buy her out of the property.

But Clement quickly returned to her secluded lifestyle. Alone in the crumbling mansion, she was befriended by a new arrival in the district, Esme Livingstone, who was intrigued by the proud old lady. The Livingstones soon won over Clement, convincing her to remove the caveat over Tullaree in exchange for £3,000 and promising to build her a new cottage on the property in which to see out her days. They also paid £12,000 to Ross Smith to discharge the mortgages Stan Livingstone obtained a contract from the Tarwin River Improvement Trust to clear the long-silted Fish Creek Outlet and drain the swamp isolating Tullaree.

After years supporting their relative, the Carnaghans were extremely concerned about the close relationship that had formed between the recluse and her new neighbours, concerns that deepened when they discovered she had removed the caveat. Clem Carnaghan and his cousins were the beneficiaries of their aunt's will, and with her only asset sold he would not be able to recover the funds he had spent sustaining his elderly aunt over many years. During this time, Clem Carnaghan took Clement away from Tullaree for the first time in many years, taking her to the home he shared with his mother in St Kilda, which was later alleged to be a kidnapping.

== Disappearance ==
Threats, kidnapping, and family trouble were a blight on the closing days of Clement's life, culminating in the killing of her dog, Dingo. Clement found the dog with its throat cut one morning in March 1952, shortly before her disappearance, a killing she attributed to unknown "enemies".

Clement was last seen on May 21, 1952, with the alarm being raised several days later by Esme Livingstone. Family, neighbours, and wider residents of the district were convinced that Clement had met with foul play, believing that she knew the swamp surrounding her home and the wider district too well for the disappearance to be accidental.

Hundreds of people, perhaps enticed by the old rumours of buried treasure, were involved in the initial search for Clement in the week following the discovery of her disappearance, but the icy swamp waters, driving rain, and harsh gales hampered their efforts and no sign of her was recovered before the search was called off. Police returned to look for her remains for some time as the property was re-cleared and re-drained by the Livingstones over the coming months and years.

Clement was formally presumed dead by the Supreme Court in 1954.

== Later events ==
News of a previous attempted kidnapping and medical episodes had been published at the time of the disappearance, and strange allegations were made for some time following the disappearance, with extensive correspondence located amongst her effects alluding to unknown "enemies", tales of kidnapping, and impersonated relatives.

Further allegations regarding Clement's mental state and the Livingstones' influence over her were made by the Carnaghans following their discovery that a new will had been drawn up shortly before Clement's death, disinheriting Clem Carnaghan and leaving the estate solely to his cousins. Legal proceedings also revealed that the Livingstones had borrowed back £2,700 of the £3,000 they had paid her when they purchased the property.

At the beginning of 1954, Stan Livingstone was taken to court by the Tarwin River Improvement Trust for preventing their other contractors from clearing the drains that ran through the property. Livingstone claimed that he had been left unpaid for work he had done on behalf of the trust, but was ordered to allow access by the court. This refusal has been viewed with suspicion by later writers, who suggest it is evidence of his involvement. The Livingstones sold Tullaree for £67,500 in 1956, a sizable return on the £15,000 they spent to acquire the property.

Human remains were occasionally found in the district, almost always evoking speculation that it was the solution to the Clement mystery. The most sensational find was during the early development of the nearby town of Venus Bay in 1978. When a female corpse discovered buried near the remains of a shovel, a 1940s-vintage handbag, and fine silk scarf, as well a number of coins minted prior to Clement's disappearance.

During the resulting inquest in 1980, witnesses testified that Esme Livingstone once told them that her husband was responsible for the death of Clement, and that she was fearful that one day he would murder her as well. Stan Livingstone rejected the allegations but the coroner found the Livingstones' testimony unreliable. Medical testimony was provided that the body belonged to an elderly Aboriginal woman. Unable to link the remains to Margaret Clement, or even determine a cause of death, coroner Kevin Mason returned an open finding.

As stories circulated of just how willing his aunt had been to take her final trip to St Kilda, nephew Clem Carnaghan was also seen as a likely suspect in Clement's disappearance. In 1953, he started court proceedings as a beneficiary of her 1925 will, seeking to have the 1951 will invalidated with the ultimate aim of declaring the sale to the Livingstones void. The case lasted several years, before Chief Justice Sir Edmund Herring ultimately found that the 1951 will was indeed valid, and that the Livingstones were the lawful owners of the property.

Homicide Squad detectives who re-examined the case in 1980 and 2007 believed that Stan Livingstone, a former footballer known for feats of strength, a black temper, and abusive behaviour towards his wife was indeed responsible for Clement's death. Having gained control of her valuable property, he then needed to dispose of the old lady to capitalise on his investment. However, they lacked the evidence to bring the matter to trial. With the death of Stan and Esme Livingstone in the early 1990s, and no prospect of recovering Clement's remains, the matter is likely to remain officially unsolved.
