= Tarwin Lower =

- Town
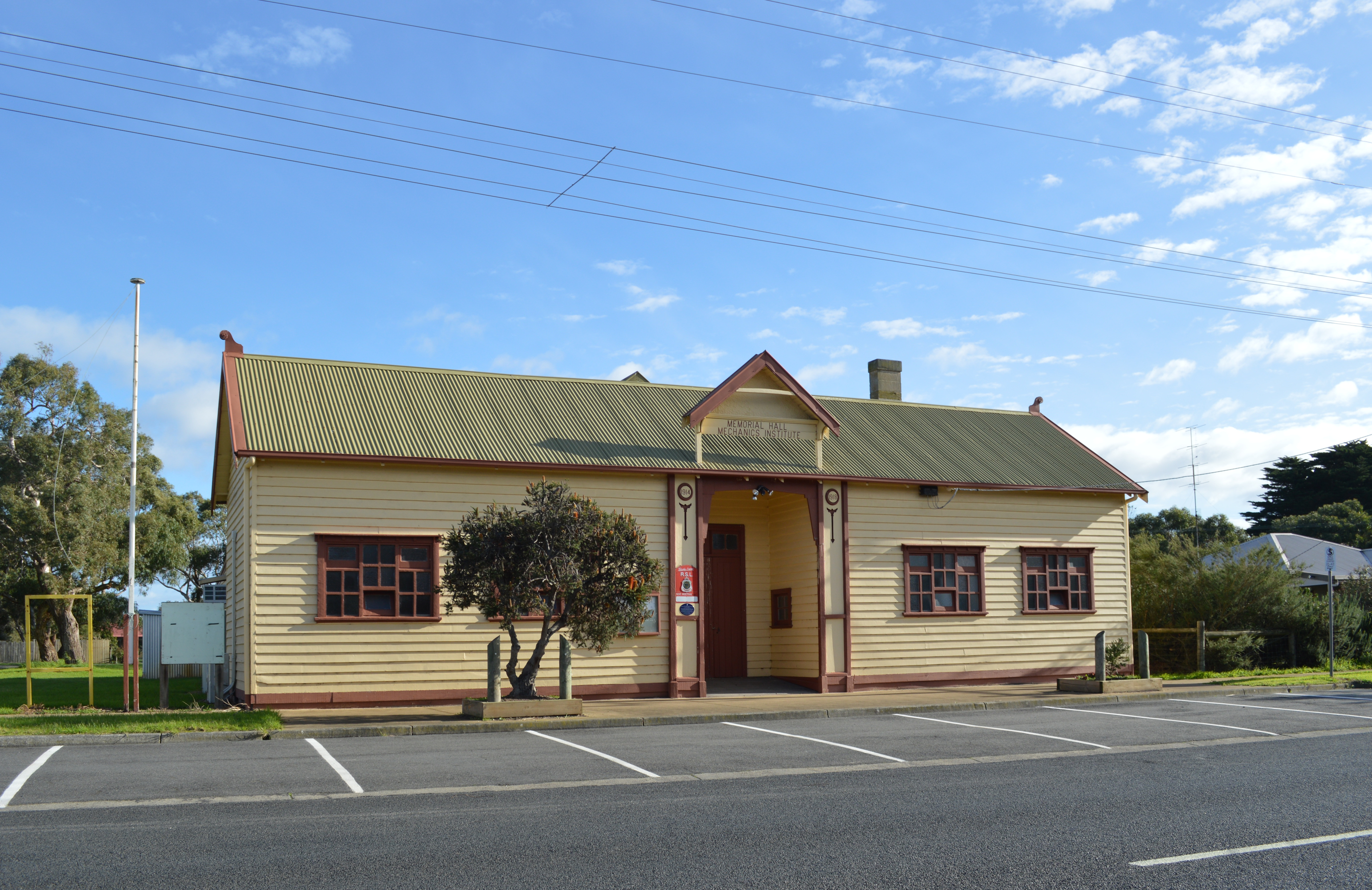
- Mechanics Institute and Memorial Hall

- Coordinates: 38°42′S 145°51′E
- Country: Australia
- State: Victoria
- LGA: South Gippsland Shire
- Location: 167 km (104 mi) SE of Melbourne; 33 km (21 mi) E of Wonthaggi; 7 km (4.3 mi) E of Venus Bay

Government
  - State electorate: Gippsland South
  - Federal division: Monash

Population
  - Total: 358 (2016 census)
- Postcode: 3956

Tarwin Lower is a small town located 175 kilometres (109 mi) south-east of Melbourne, Australia. It rests on the south bank of the Tarwin River and at the 2006 census, had a population of 115.

== History ==
The region was originally inhabited by the Tarwin clan of Indigenous Australians. The Tarwin tribe were industrious, and known as "the tomahawk makers". They had quarries for the required hard stone near the present site of Wonthaggi, and also used a softer stone from Cape Liptrap to sharpen the implements.

British settlement is believed to have started at an area called Tarwin Meadows. The area south of Tarwin Lower is still called by this name. Tarwin Lower is on the banks of the Tarwin River. The first major land-holder in the area was George Black. Black leased land from the Bass River through to Cape Liptrap. Black bought the Tarwin Meadows Run in 1851.

Several drowning fatalities have occurred over the years, primarily because of the tidal nature of the river. One of the most well-known is that of a young man who drowned in the river many years ago. His gravestone is situated on River Drive just before the roundabout. Until 1990, camping along the banks of the river was a summer pastime for many families from around the state. This was discouraged because of the risk of flooding, and the lack of supervision of swimmers in a tidal river.

The Post Office opened on 1 February 1881.

Bill Twomey Sr lead Tarwin Lower to a premiership in the South Gippsland Football League in 1937.

== The Town today ==
The majority of the town is on its main street — River Drive — and is often passed through by holiday makers on their way to nearby Venus Bay, or as a scenic route to Walkerville and Waratah Bay. The main shopping strip is home to several small shops, Community Church (Uniting and Anglican services alternate each Sunday, Catholic Mass on Saturday 6pm), local Mechanics Institute [hall], tennis courts and Country Fire Authority (CFA). Behind River Drive is the small primary school and the Community Centre which hosts several small groups and is visited by doctors, welfare nurse and occasional other medical plus education services for under school-age children.

During main holiday weekends and periods throughout the year Tarwin Lower hosts a decent market catering to all tastes. It is mainly based at the Mechanic's Institute hall and its surrounding land, and continues to sprawl each time it runs.

At the western end of the town is the local fishing jetty and a very long picnic table.

The town is home to the local football team, the Tarwin Sharks, who were premiers in 2004 in the local Alberton Football League.

Until recently a small golf-course operated on River Drive.

A walk along the boardwalk exists along the banks of the River from Venus Bay to Tarwin Lower. This is very busy during summer months with walkers and cyclists of all ages.

The town has hosted the Unify Gathering Heavy Music Festival in 2015, 2019, and 2022. The campsite and arena have been situated on the football grounds and surrounding fields.

== Notable people ==
Notable people from or who have lived in the area of Tarwin Lower include:

- George Murray Black, graverobber and pillager of Indigenous Australian burial sites.
- Joff Ellen ("Joffa Boy"), Australian entertainer, TV pioneer, actor and comedian.
- Frank Vale, cold storage industry and dairy factory industry pioneer.
