= Wreck Beach (Bass Coast Shire) =

Beach in Victoria, Australia

Coordinates: 38°39′32″S 145°34′48″E

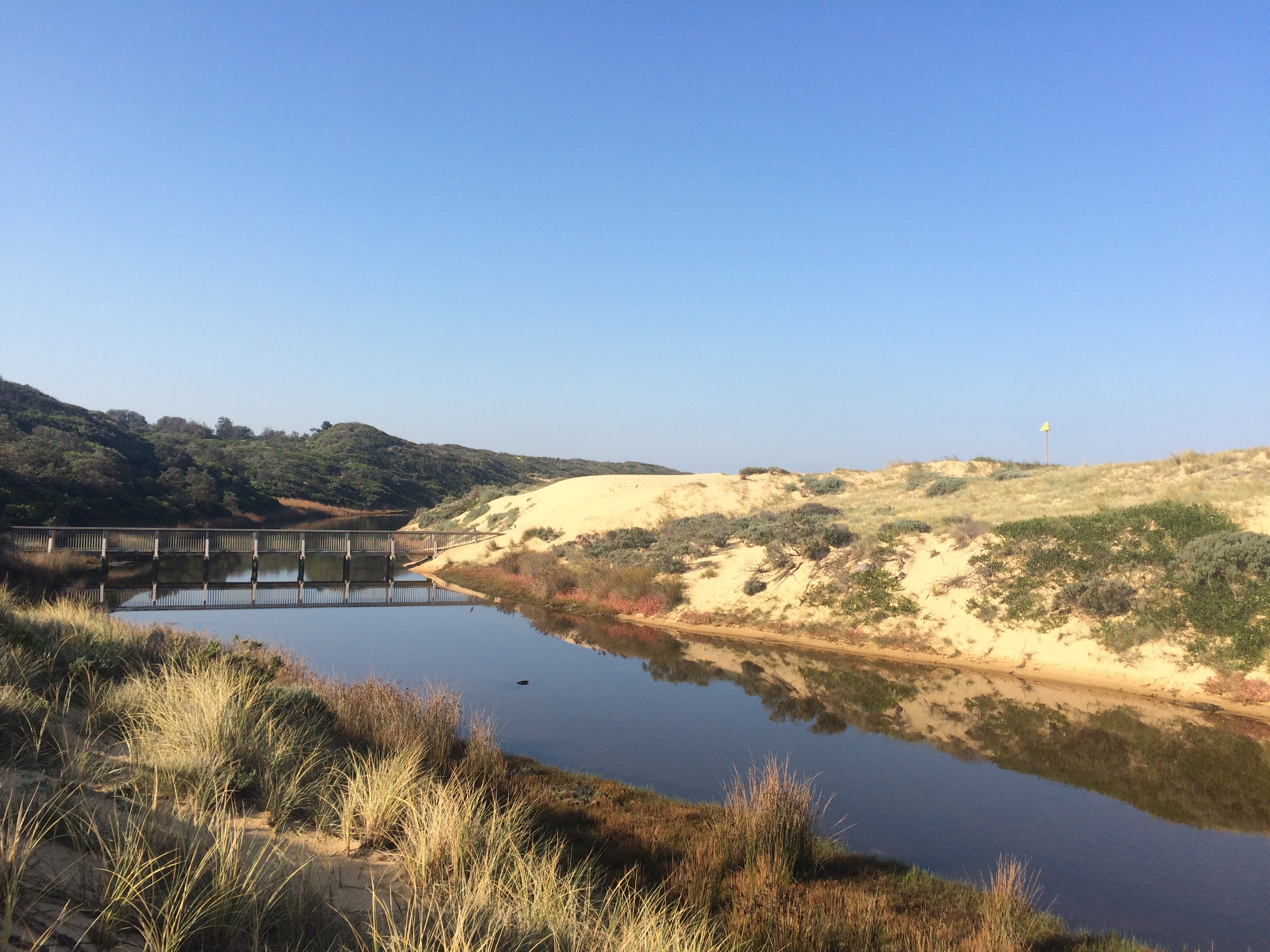
Wreck Creek and bridge

Wreck Beach is a south-west facing, sandy bay (Bass Coast Beach Number 23) located within the Bunurong Marine Park approximately two kilometres south of the town of Cape Paterson and 132 kilometres (82 mi) south-east of Melbourne via the South Gippsland and Bass Highways, in the Bass Coast Shire of Gippsland, Victoria, Australia.

The beach is south-west facing fronted by intertidal rock flats and backed by sand dunes extending up to 500m inland and fronted by near continuous intertidal rock flats. At high tide, waves break over the submerged while at low tide, the rocks are exposed.

A small creek (often referred to as 'Coal Creek') runs into the ocean at the east end of the bay.

The beach offers good surf fishing but no reef fish are to be taken.
