= Stan Livingstone =

Australian rules footballer, born 1913

Personal information
- Full name: Stanley Russell Livingstone
- Born: 18 September 1913
- Died: 13 October 1992 (aged 79)
- Original team: Melbourne Seconds / Lockhart
- Height: 189 cm (6 ft 2 in)
- Weight: 86 kg (190 lb)

Playing career^{1}
Years	Club	Games (Goals)
1937, 1939–40	Footscray	16 (3)
- ^{1} Playing statistics correct to the end of 1940.

Stan Livingstone (18 September 1913 – 13 October 1992) was a former Australian rules footballer who played with Footscray in the Victorian Football League (VFL). He also played for Port Melbourne in the VFA and Melbourne.

Following his retirement from the VFL, Livingstone became a grazier and property investor. He owned a number of large rural properties in Victoria, including Tatura, Tullaree in Gippsland, and Murrundindi near Yea. He later moved to Curtis Island, Queensland with his wife, Esme (nee Liddington).

During his time at Tullaree, Livingstone was a suspect in the sensational 1952 disappearance of the previous owner, a famous recluse named Margaret Clement, popularly known as the Lady of the Swamp. No charges were ever filed against him, although a Coronial inquest in 1980 found his account of the disappearance "far from frank".

Livingstone died in a fire near Mount Larcom, Queensland in 1992. His remains are buried in the Gippsland Memorial Park in Traralgon.
