= Buffalo, Victoria =

Buffalo
- Town
- Coordinates: 38°39′S 146°02′E
- Country: Australia
- State: Victoria
- LGA: South Gippsland Shire

Government
  - State electorate: Gippsland South
  - Federal division: Monash

Population
  - Total: 272 (2016 census)
- Postcode: 3958

Buffalo is a town in South Gippsland Shire in the South Gippsland region of Victoria, Australia. In 2016, it had a population of 272.

== History ==
The town was originally settled as a part of the rail-line link between Foster and Leongatha during the late 1800s. The town plans are available. Because of the advent of the motor-car, the township did not progress beyond being a small village. The local area is supported by many local farmers (including dairy, sheep, goats, and beef) as well as local people that have moved into the area but work elsewhere, and retirees.

The main shopping area for many years included Matthews Feed and Grain Store, a general store and post office, a telephone exchange and a primary school.

Matthews Feed and Grain has now been taken over by Pivot. The general store and post office are still in business. The phone exchange is now automated. The primary school is now closed and privately owned.

The township was serviced by the Great Southern Rail Line until the early 1990s: first as both passenger and freight. By approximately 1985, it was only used for freight (fertiliser, etc., for Matthews). The railway line tracks have now been removed and the land is now part of the Great Southern Rail Trail. The original station platform remains and the Management Committee of the Rail Trail intends to have picnic facilities available.

The general store became well known in the 1950s as the shop the "Lady of the Swamp", Margaret Clement of Tullaree, who disappeared without trace in 1952) frequented. The general store remained in operation by the Neale family for many years.

The primary school celebrated its centenary in 1994 but closed in 2001, after a dramatic reduction in school enrolments (i.e. 43 in 1997 to 4 in 2001). The temporary buildings were removed, leaving the original school rooms. A time capsule was planted near the bird bath on the Street corner of the site at the time of the centenary. The school celebrated the centenary with new paving, garden beds, a mural on the art shed, decorated tiles by children and a new playground (paid for with funds raised by the parents' committee). The playground is now situated on the site of the old Railway Station. The town history book had an update and was printed at the primary school. The book is still available for further insight on the township.

== Local tourism ==
There are several B&B accommodation places available. Also, there is the Great Southern Rail Trail for those attracted to walking or cycling. It is a 30-minute drive to the beach at Walkerville.
