= Bunurong Marine and Coastal Park =

Protected area in Victoria, Australia

Bunurong Marine Park
- IUCN category VI (protected area with sustainable use of natural resources)
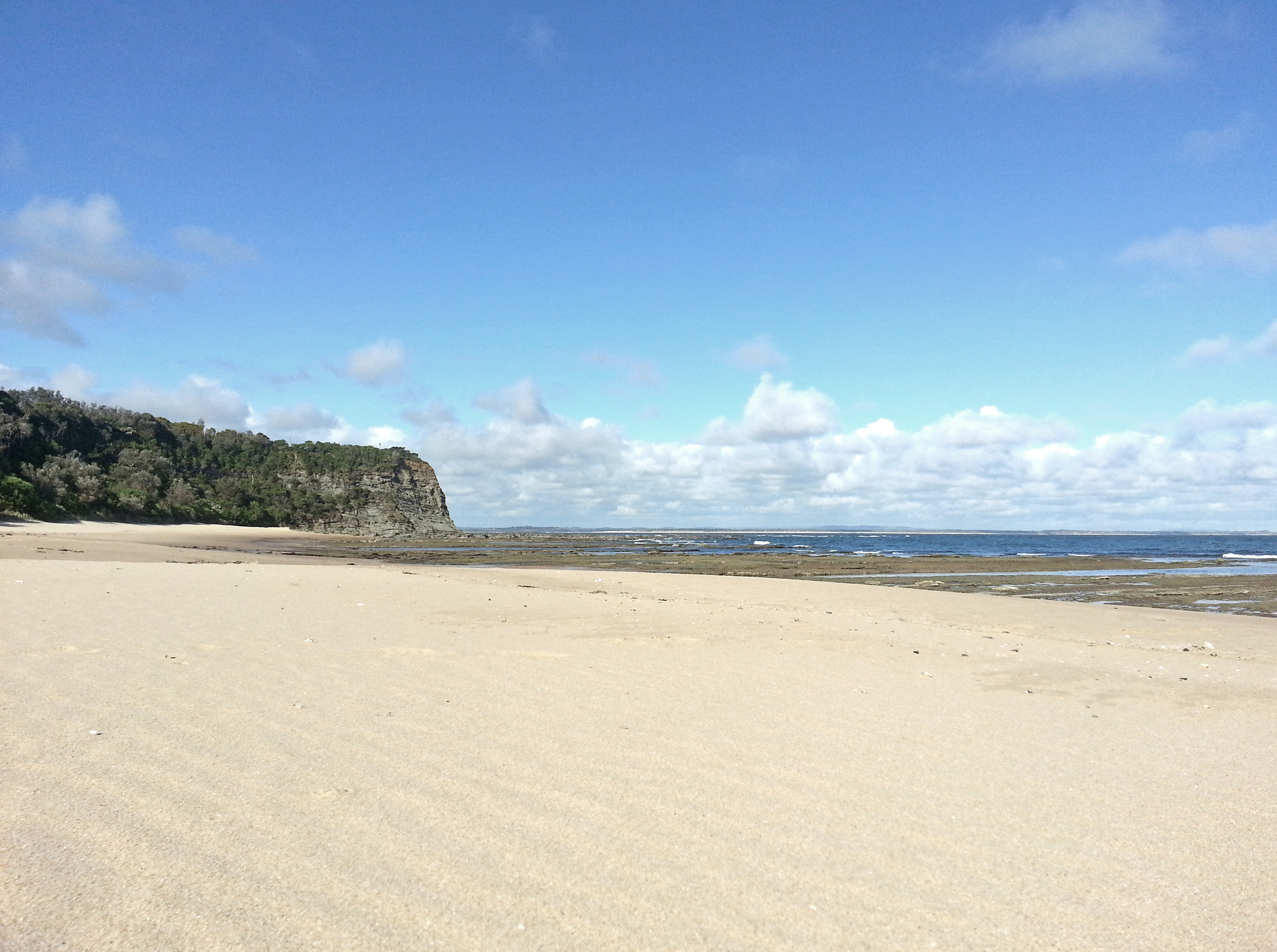
- The Caves Beach, near Eagles Nest in Inverloch.

- Location within Victoria
- Location: Victoria
- Nearest city: Cape Paterson
- Coordinates: 38°40′19″S 145°36′58″E
- Area: 12.03 km^{2} (4.64 sq mi)
- Established: 17 December 1991
- Visitors: circa 250,000 (in 2005)
- Governing body: Parks Victoria
- Website: http://parkweb.vic.gov.au/explore/parks/bunurong-marine-park

Bunurong Coastal Park
- IUCN category III (natural monument or feature)
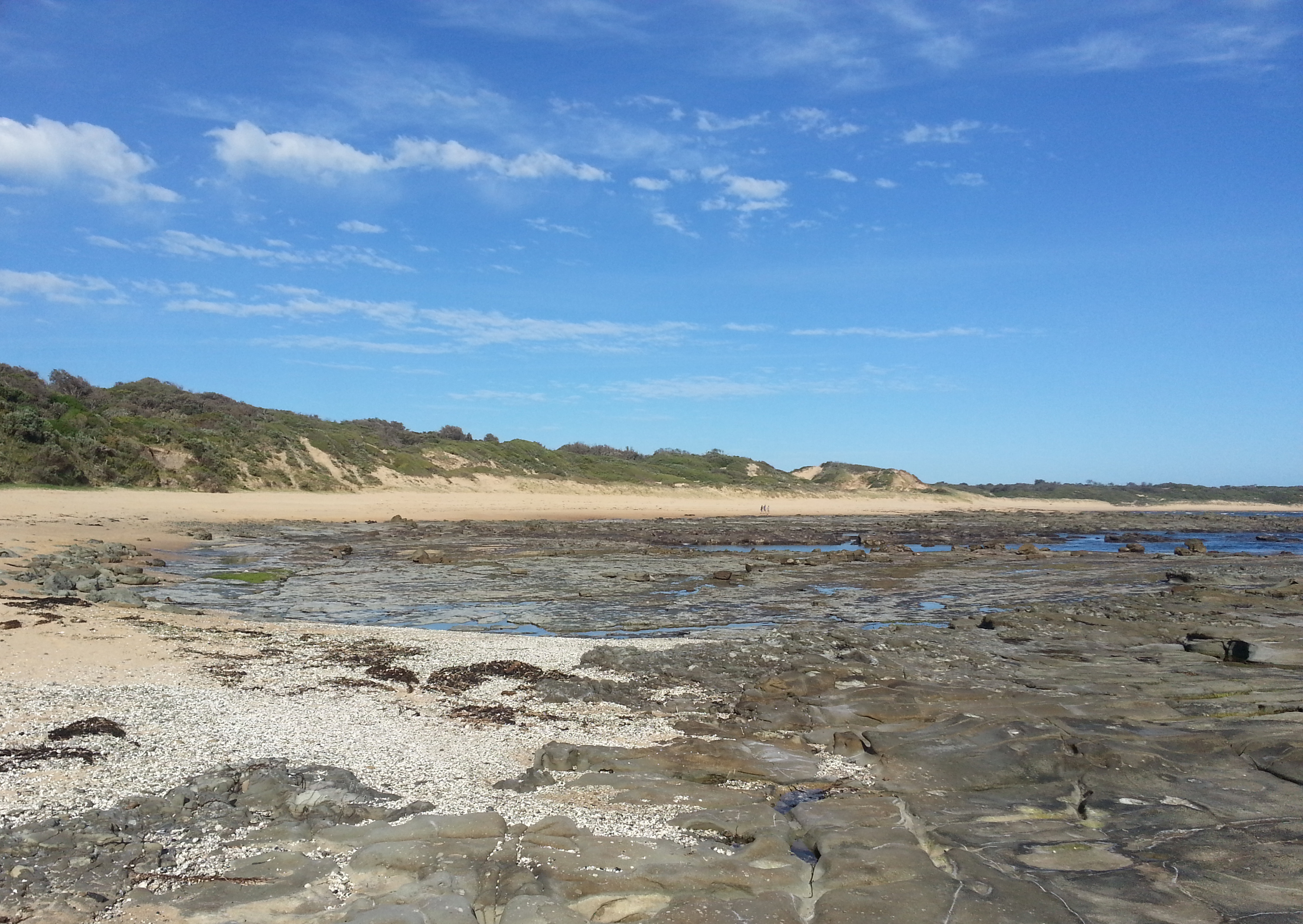
- Coal Point
- Location: Victoria
- Nearest city: Cape Paterson
- Area: 92.9 km^{2} (35.9 sq mi)
- Established: June 1984
- Governing body: Parks Victoria
- Website: http://parkweb.vic.gov.au/explore/parks/bunurong-coastal-reserve

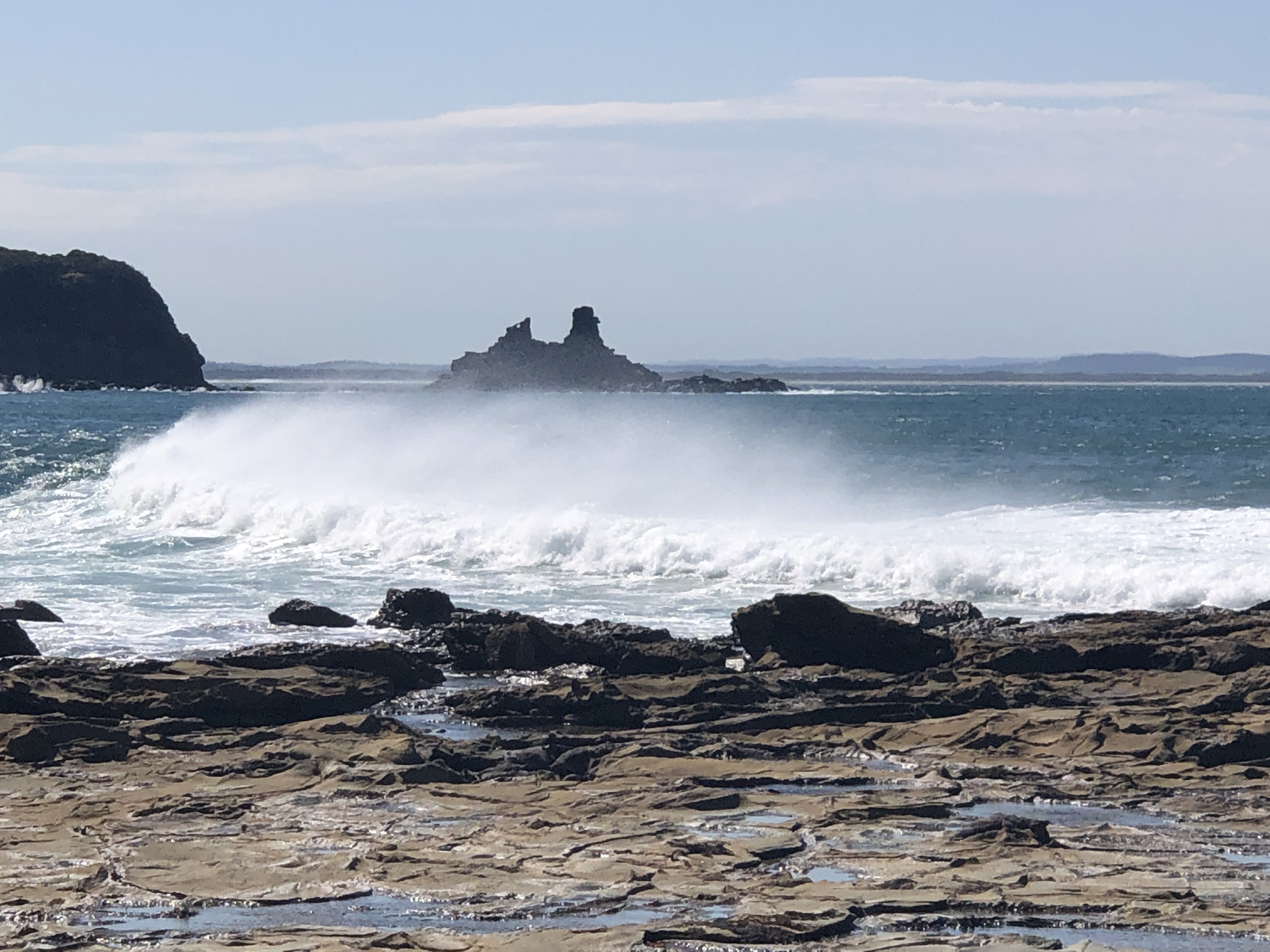
Eagles Nest

The Bunurong Marine and Coastal Park (/ˈbʌnərɒŋ/) collectively are a marine park and a coastal park located along the reef and coast of Harmers Haven, Cape Paterson and Inverloch in the South Gippsland region of Victoria, Australia. Collectively, the parks are located approximately 140 kilometres (87 mi) southeast of Melbourne, between Coal Point in the west to Wreck Creek in the east, and are used for walking, picnicking, boating, education and research.

The 1,203-hectare (2,970-acre) Bunurong Marine Park comprises two separate areas along 12 kilometres (7.5 mi) of coastline and was gazetted on 17 December 1991. The broad rock platforms and underwater reefs of Bunurong Marine Park support a remarkable range of habitats, containing a diverse array of plants and animals.

The 93-hectare (230-acre) Bunurong Coastal Park includes the narrow strip of public land adjacent to Bunurong Marine Park and Bunurong Marine National Park, between the eastern boundary of the Cape Paterson Foreshore Reserve at Undertow Bay in the west and Wreck Creek in the east, and was gazetted in June 1984.

Both parks draw their name from the Australian Aboriginal Bunurong people who are the traditional owners of the land and water in the region.

== Etymology ==
The Bunurong parks are named after the Bunurong Aboriginal people who owned this stretch of coast for thousands of years prior to colonisation. The Boakoolawal clan lived in the Kilcunda area south of the Bass River, and the Yowenjerre were west of the Tarwin River along what is now the Bunurong Marine and Coastal Parks near Wonthaggi. Middens containing charcoal and shellfish mark the location of their campsites along the coast.

== Features ==
The principal features of the park are the striking rock formations including the large rock structure called Eagles Nest, located adjacent to the coastline at the eastern end of the marine national park. Eagles Nest also resembles the top half of a map of Australia. Other attractions include Flat Rocks where there are large rockpools for rockpool rambling and direct access from Cape Paterson-Inverloch Road. The Bunurong Marine National Park is accessed at many different points along this coast, a popular one being near Cape Paterson caravan park on Surf Beach Road as it has a modified rockpool for swimming. Direct and more difficult access to the marine national park is via car parks off Cape Paterson-Inverloch Road. Exploring, snorkelling and scuba diving are popular. There are boat launching facilities at Inverloch on Anderson Inlet.

Australia’s first dinosaur bone, the Cape Paterson Claw, was discovered in 1903 by William Ferguson at what is now Bunurong Marine Park at Eagles Nest beach in Inverloch. Since then more than 6,000 bones and teeth of small dinosaurs, mammals, birds, turtles and fish have been excavated. There is a dinosaur exhibition at the Inverloch Shell Museum.

=== Ecology ===
Together with the Bunurong Marine National Park, the Bunurong Marine and Coastal Parks support many marine animals including seastars, featherstars, crabs, snails, 87 species of fish, whales and seals. It has the highest recorded diversity of intertidal and subtidal invertebrates in eastern Victoria. The range of seaweed species is large.

=== Restrictions ===
It is prohibited to kill or take any matter (i.e., catch fish, collect seashells or kill or take any sea or land creature, living or dead) from the Bunurong Marine National Park, but fishing (only with a rod) is permitted in the Bunurong Marine Park.

== See also ==
- Protected areas of Victoria
