= Frank Vale =

Australian cold chain leader (1908–2006)

- Born: Frank Walter Blake Vale; 26 October 1908; South Gippsland, Victoria
- Died: 21 May 2006 (aged 97); Victoria, Australia
- Awards: Japan Medal
- Scientific career
- Fields: Cold chain; refrigeration

Frank Walter Blake Vale (26 October 1908 – 21 May 2006) was an Australian businessperson who was a leading pioneer of the Australian cold chain industry's mechanical refrigeration era and of the modern Victorian dairy industry. He was a manager and leader who both applied and contributed to the engineering and marketing of the various steps in the cold chain.

== Early life and education ==
Vale was born on 26 October 1908 (one of 12 children) in Toora, Victoria, a small farming community in South Gippsland, Victoria, Australia. Vale's parents and siblings lived on an estate at Tarwin Meadows, a large dairy property with 1,000 cows, for which his father was a bookkeeper. He attended school at Tarwin Meadows, finishing in the 8th grade at 14 years of age and obtaining his merit certificate with a high rating.

== Legacy ==
His career in the industry is acknowledged through the "Frank Vale Award" which is presented annually at the Refrigerated Warehouse and Transport Association of Australia (RWTA) Conference and Exhibition to an outstanding young achiever.
