= Venus Bay, Victoria =

Venus Bay
- Town
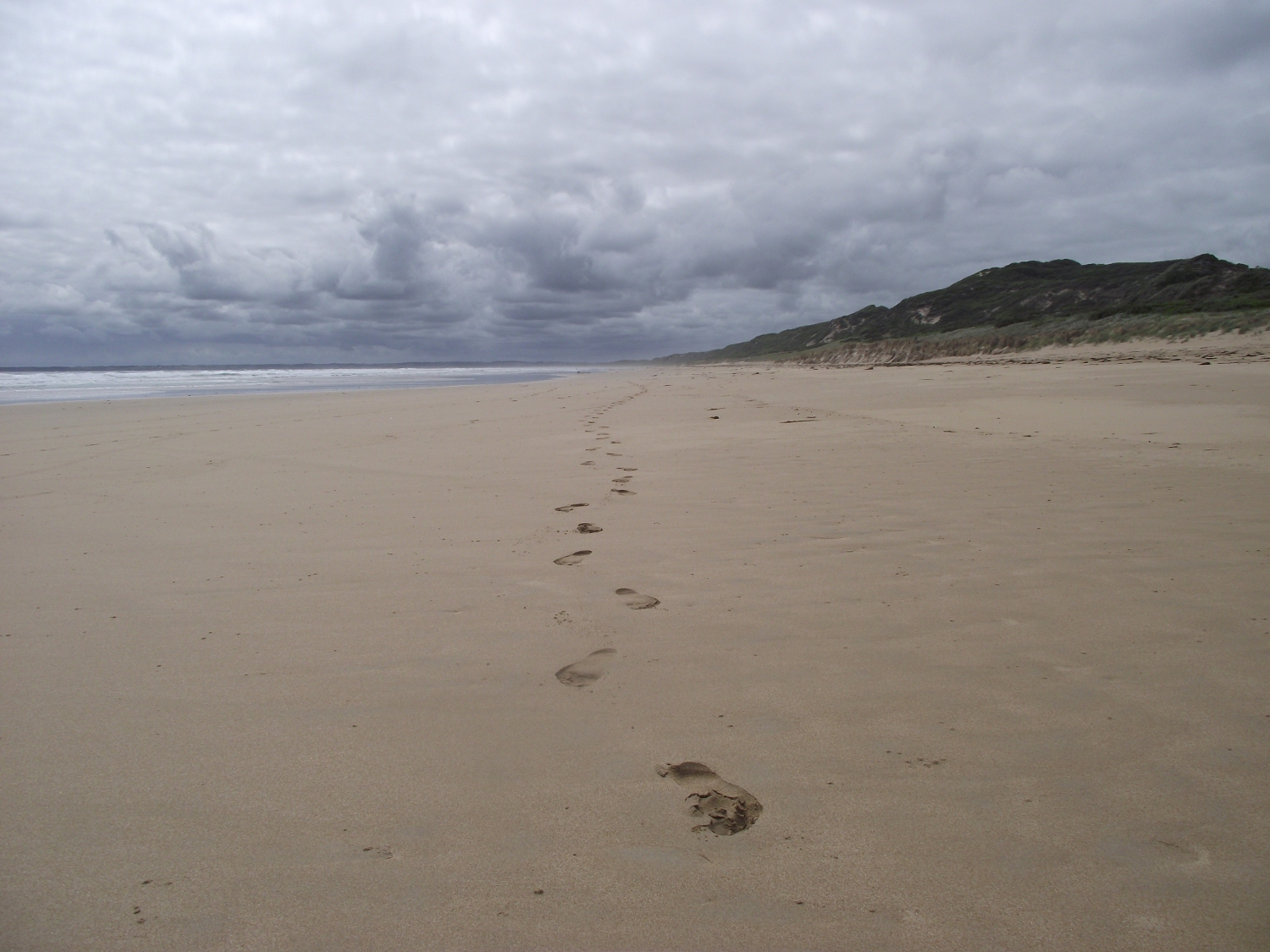
- Beach 4

- Coordinates: 38°41′0″S 145°48′0″E
- Country: Australia
- State: Victoria
- LGA: South Gippsland Shire
- Location: 173 km (107 mi) SE of Melbourne; 39 km (24 mi) E of Wonthaggi; 28 km (17 mi) SE of Inverloch; 7 km (4.3 mi) W of Tarwin Lower

Government
  - State electorate: Gippsland South
  - Federal division: Monash

Population
  - Total: 904 (2021 census)
- Postcode: 3956

Venus Bay is a wide bay and a township on the east coast of Victoria, Australia. At the 2021 census Venus Bay had a population of 904.

The name Venus Bay was given to the bay by a French expedition under Nicholas Baudin, after George Bass's trading ship the Venus. The expedition had traded with Bass in Sydney in 1801.

The town of Venus Bay is situated on a narrow peninsula of land, located 180 km (110 mi) south-east of Melbourne. Originally named Evergreen, the town takes its name from the body of water on its western shore. On the eastern side of the peninsula is Anderson's Inlet, named after the settler Samuel Anderson.

European settlement of the area began from 1851, when the Tarwin Meadows pastoral run was established by George Black. By the 1870s, the area where the Venus Bay township is located was part of a property called Evergreen, which was split into a number of smaller properties during the 1950s. The township was subdivided into 1,500 properties in 1959, with an additional 1,300 added in the 1980s.

Venus Bay is a popular holiday retreat for people from Melbourne and is close to other popular South Gippsland tourist spots such as Phillip Island and Wilsons Promontory. The permanent population hovers just below 1,000, however this can swell into the thousands during holiday periods.

The town is split into three 'estates'. The First Estate is home to the only shopping strip in Venus Bay. Three of Venus Bay's five surf beaches (Nos. 1, 2 and 3 beaches) are in the First Estate, with the Venus Bay Surf Livesaving Club located at the No. 1 Beach. This is the only patrolled beach, although during the busy summer period surf patrols regularly make their way up and down the beaches to just beyond No. 5 beach.

The Venus Bay Community Centre is located in the First Estate and runs a variety of programs and activities and is also home to the Community Recycling Op Shop.

The Second Estate contains the Fourth and Fifth beaches as well as the fishing jetty on Anderson's Inlet. At the edge of the Second Estate is an elevated viewing platform that allows visitors to view Anderson's Inlet and view the many kangaroos that live in the eastern shores.

The Third Estate is a sparsely populated and underdeveloped area leading to the tip of the peninsula (Point Smythe). This estate has the Doyle's Road foreshore reserve and the Point Smythe reservation, home to many wandering tracks that lead to secluded beaches on both shores of the peninsula and to the tip at the mouth of Anderson's Inlet.

The town attracted significant media attention in 1978, when human remains were discovered near a shovel, 1940s-era handbag, and pre-1950s coinage during the preparations for construction of a beach house. It was speculated that the remains were those of "the lady of the swamp", Margaret Clement of Tullaree. Clement had disappeared in the area in 1952. The subsequent coronial inquiry was unable to link her disappearance to the remains and returned an open finding.

In recent years, the residents of Venus Bay and nearby Tarwin Lower have fought off developers seeking to drain the environmental wetlands and set up marina and resort developments.

In 2017, there were concerns from residents over excessive harvesting of the pipi shellfish by daytrippers coming from Melbourne. Incidents of vandalism related to the harvesting were reported in the area.
