= Inverloch, Victoria =

Inverloch
- Town
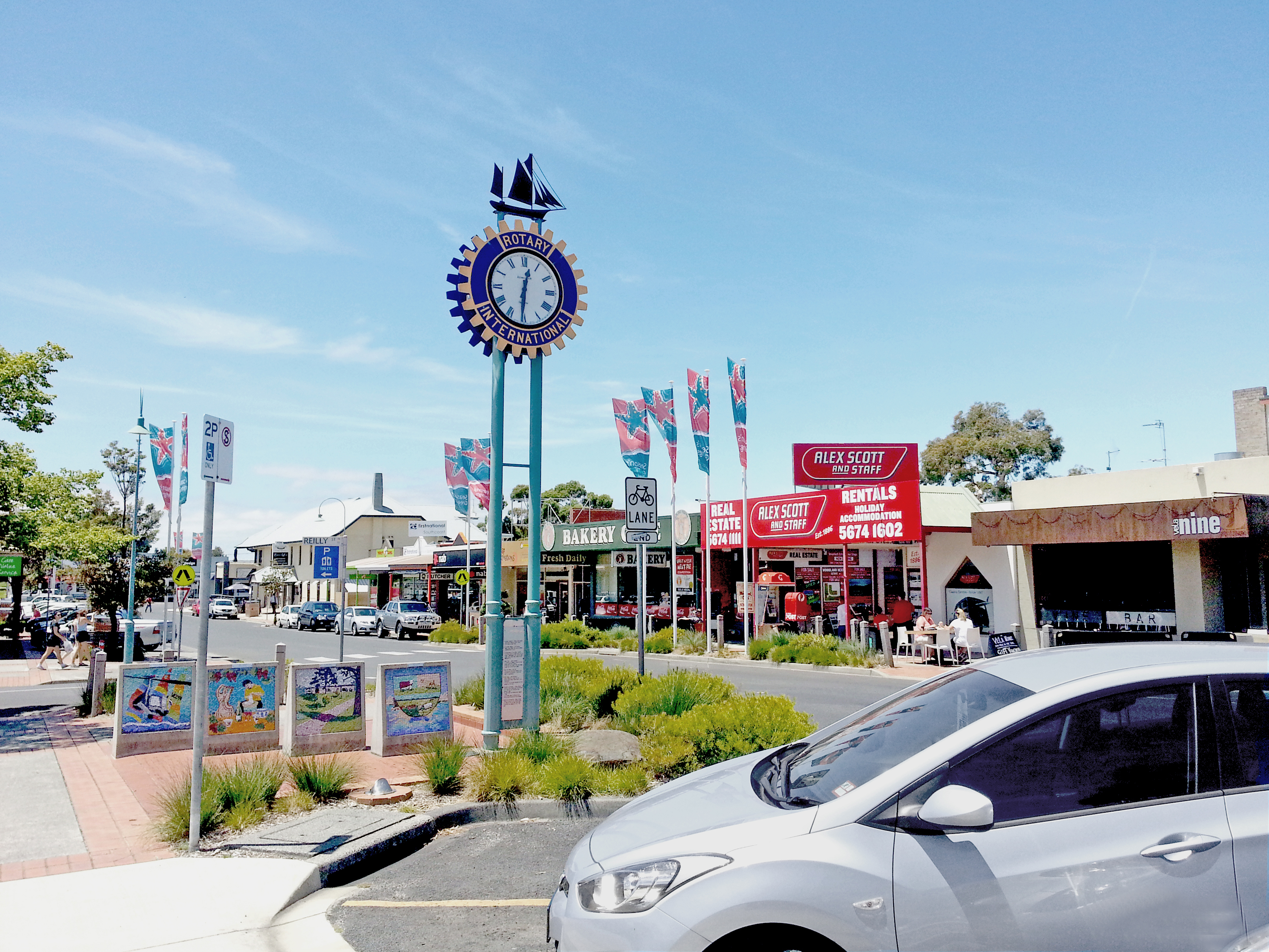
- Shopping Strip, Abeckett Street

- Coordinates: 38.6334°S 145.7278°E
- Country: Australia
- State: Victoria
- LGA: Bass Coast Shire
- Location: 141 km (88 mi) SE of Melbourne; 14 km (8.7 mi) E of Wonthaggi

Government
  - State electorate: Bass
  - Federal division: Monash
- Elevation: 20.7 m (68 ft)

Population
  - Total: 6,526 (2021 census)
- Postcode: 3996
- Mean max temp: 18.7 °C (65.7 °F)
- Mean min temp: 9.5 °C (49.1 °F)
- Annual rainfall: 920.7 mm (36.25 in)

Inverloch /ˈɪnvərlɒk/ is a town in Victoria, Australia. It is 143 kilometres (89 mi) south east of Melbourne via the South Gippsland Highway on the Bass Highway in the Bass Coast Shire of Gippsland. Known originally for the calm waters of Anderson Inlet, it is now also known for the discovery of Australia's first dinosaur bone.

The town had a population of 6,526 as of the 2021 census.

Inverloch is a popular tourist destination, particularly for swimming, kitesurfing and windsurfing at the calm waters of Anderson Inlet. Fishing and surfing are also popular.

The town is named after Loch Inver (Lake Entrance) in Scotland.

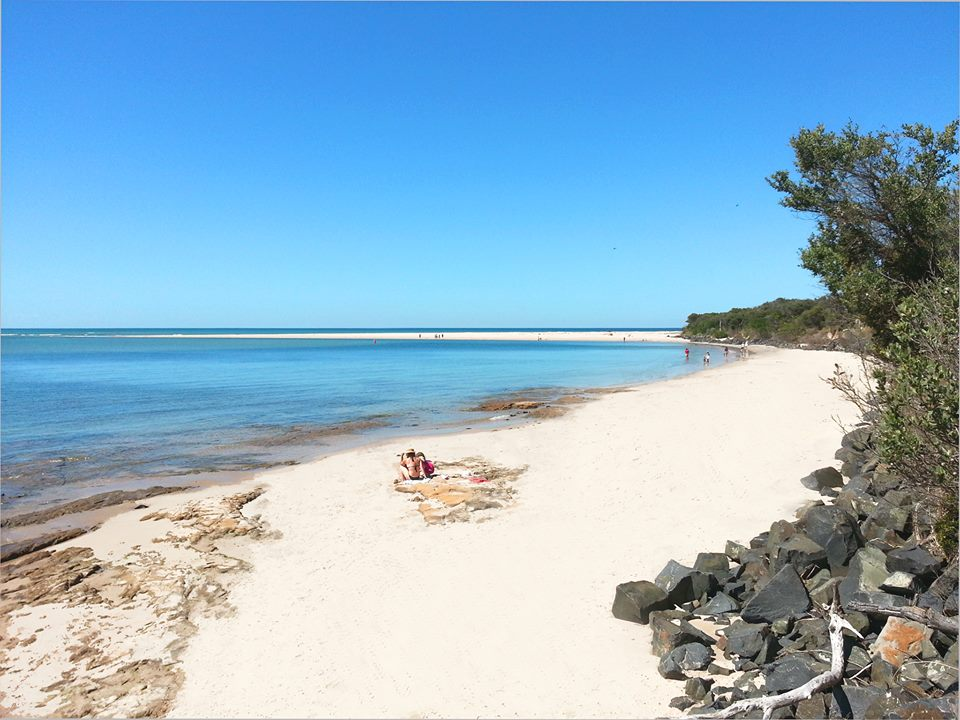
Western Beach (38), Anderson.

== History ==
The Bunurong aboriginal people were custodians of this stretch of coast for thousands of years prior to settlement by Europeans.

The first European to settle in the Inverloch area was Samuel Anderson who, together with his brothers and Robert Massie, owned cattle and grew wheat in the area. The Post Office opened on 1 September 1883 as Anderson's Inlet and was renamed Inverloch in 1889. The inlet on which the town is situated on is named Anderson Inlet after Samuel Anderson.

As the area developed, Inverloch became a port for the shipment of black coal from Wonthaggi to Melbourne.

Australia's first discovered dinosaur bone, known as the Cape Paterson Claw, was discovered here in 1903 by William Ferguson in Cape Paterson in what is now Eagles Nest in the Bunurong Marine National Park.

== Population ==
At the 2016 Census, there were 5,437 people in Inverloch. 79.6% of people were born in Australia, with the next most common country of birth was England at 4.6%. 89.1% of people spoke only English at home. The most common responses for religion were No Religion at 39.5%, Catholic at 20.0% and Anglican at 14.9%.

== Today ==
=== Anderson Inlet ===
Anderson Inlet is a shallow and dynamic estuary where the Tarwin River enters Bass Strait. It forms a 2,400 hectare almost-enclosed bay next to Inverloch, for which it provides a popular and protected beach. At low tide its intertidal mudflats provide important feeding habitat for migratory waders. It is named after the Anderson brothers, the first Europeans to settle in the area. Anderson Inlet is classified by BirdLife International as an Important Bird Area. It supports internationally significant numbers (over 6,000) of red-necked stint. It has also been known to support the critically endangered orange-bellied parrot, with six birds seen there in 1998 and two in 1999. Seashell collecting is permitted from The Caves (beach) to the north-east, past the main shopping precinct. Seashell collecting is prohibited in the Bunurong Marine National Park, namely The Oaks, Twin Reefs, Shack Bay and Eagles Nest (beaches), heading south-west after Flat Rocks and The Caves.

=== Shell Museum ===
Inverloch has a Shell Museum which also has a dinosaur exhibition. It is located opposite the Rainbow Park. Australia's first dinosaur bone, and many other dinosaur bones, were discovered in Inverloch.

=== Coast ===
Inverloch's beaches include Twin Reefs, Shack Bay, Eagles Nest, The Caves, Flat Rocks, Main Surf Beach, two more surf beaches, Anderson Inlet-Western Beach, Anderson Inlet-Browns Beach, Anderson Inlet-Venus Street and Anderson Inlet-The Glades. Twin Reefs, Shack Bay and Eagles Nest make up most of the Bunurong Marine National Park (excluding The Oaks in Cape Paterson). The Caves and Flat Rocks are a part of the Bunurong Marine Park, which starts at Coal Point in Harmers Haven.

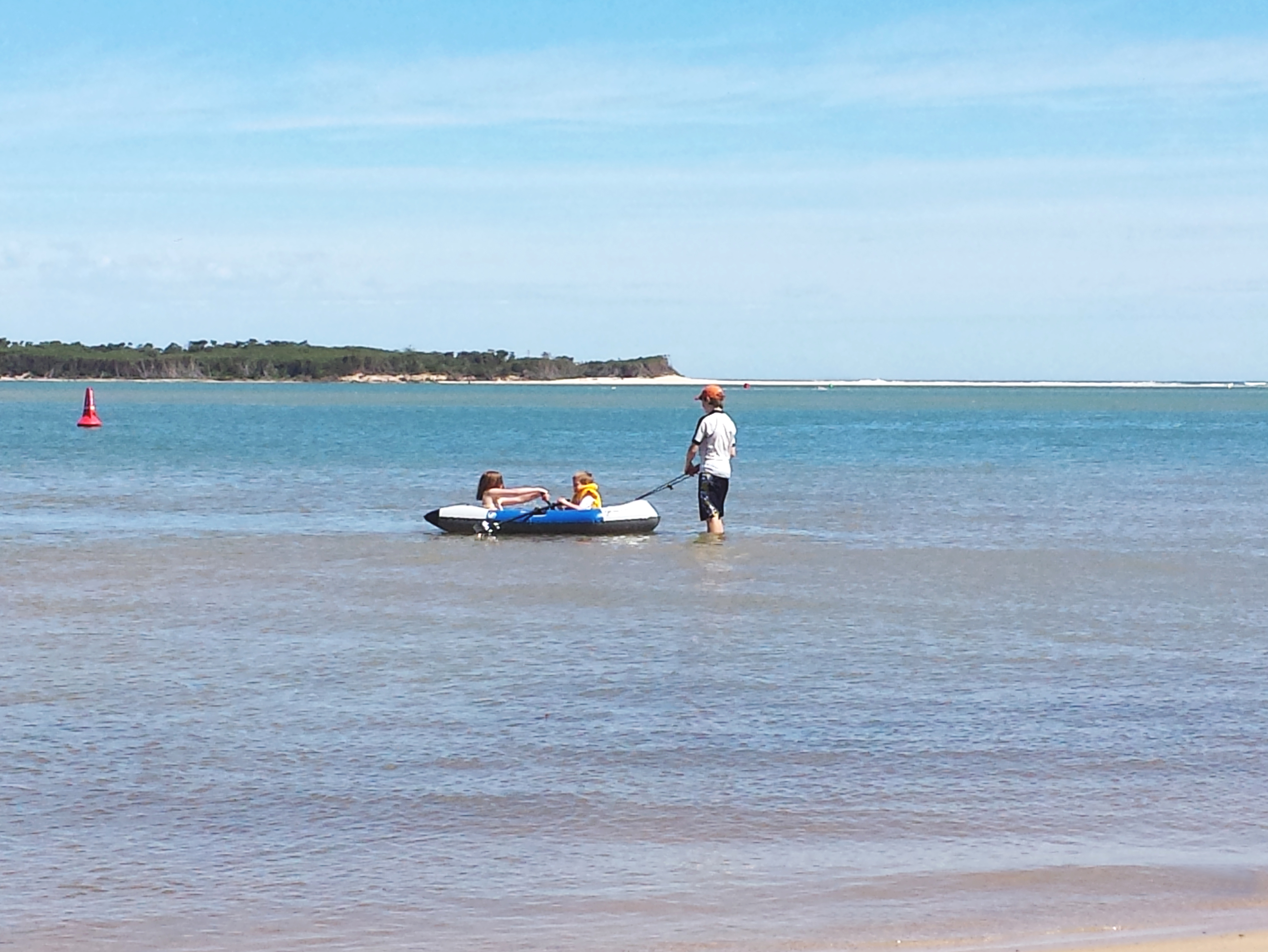
Children playing at Anderson Inlet

=== Bunurong Marine Parks ===
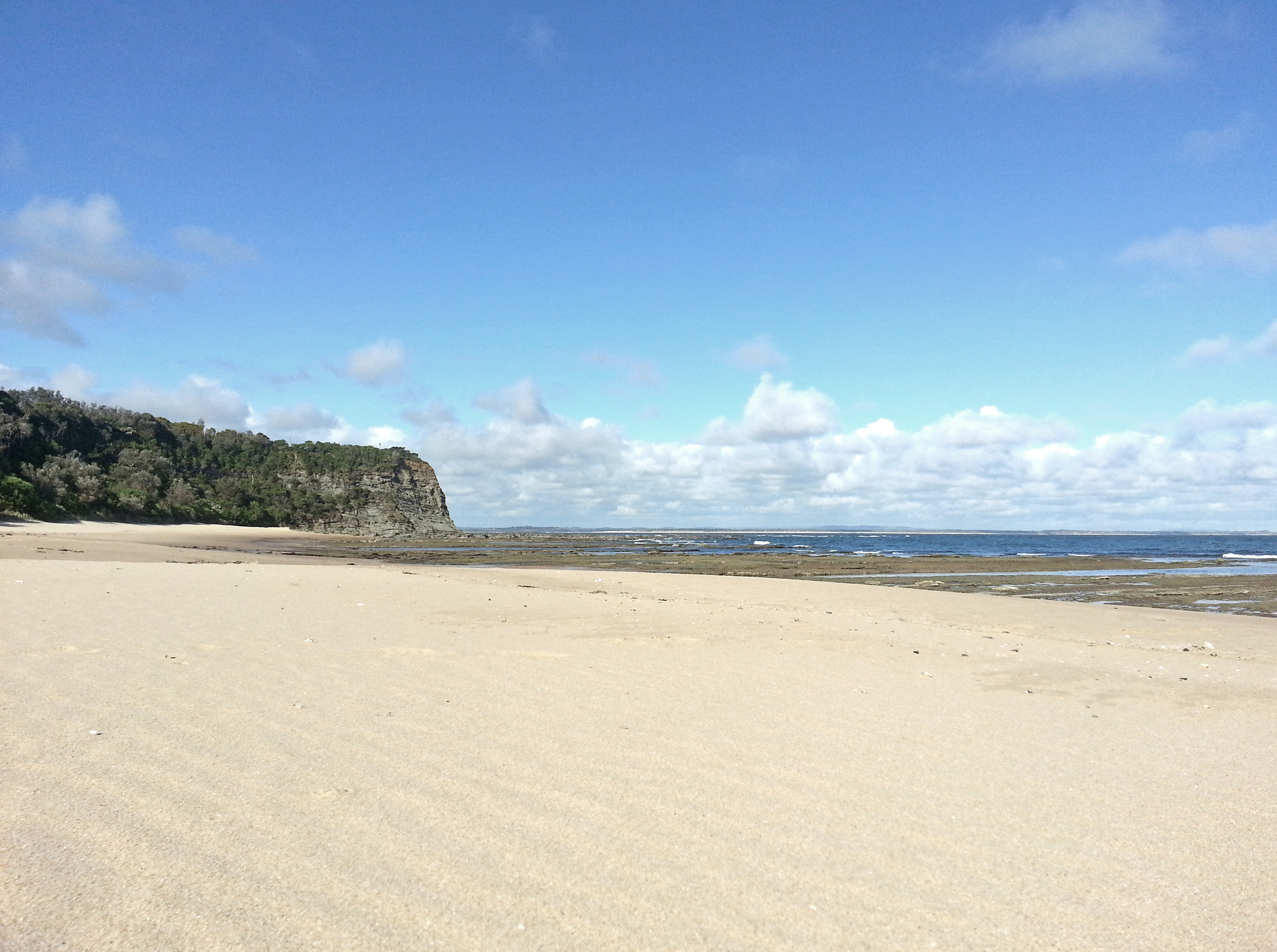
Bunurong Marine Park

Bunurong Marine Park is a 17 km marine and coastal park along the coast of Harmers Haven, Cape Paterson and Inverloch, namely Coal Point to Wreck Creek.

Bunurong Marine National Park is an outstretching middle section of Bunurong Marine Park. The National Park part is about 21 km^{2} or about 5 km in length along the coast and stretching from 2.5 km east of Cape Paterson eastwards to a point 6 km south-west of Inverloch, extending seawards for 3 nm to the limit of Victorian waters. The restricted zone/state park (Bunurong Marine National Park inside Bunurong Marine Park), on foot begins after Undertow Bay heading towards Inverloch from Cape Paterson. It is an area past Safety Beach and rockpool and past Undertow Bay beach namely The Oaks, Twin Reefs, Shack Bay and Eagles Nest. It ends at Wreck Creek in Inverloch. It is prohibited to kill or take any matter (i.e., fishing, collecting seashells or kill or take any sea or land animal, living or dead) from the smaller of the two parks; Bunurong Marine National Park.

Both parks are named after the Bunurong Aboriginal people.

Bunurong Marine Park is considered special due to the unusual set of environmental conditions. It supports many marine animals including seastars, featherstars, crabs, snails, 87 species of fish, Whales and Seals. It has the highest recorded diversity of intertidal and subtidal invertebrates in eastern Victoria. The range of seaweed species is large.

Flat Rocks is a beach which has large rockpools for rockpooling/rambling and direct access from Cape Paterson-Inverloch Road. Bunurong Marine Park is seen and accessed at many different points along this coast, a popular one being near Cape Paterson caravan park on Surf Beach Road as it has a modified rockpool for swimming. The National Park is around to the left. Direct and more difficult access to the National Park is via car parks off Cape Paterson-Inverloch Road. Exploring, snorkelling and scuba diving are popular. There are boat launching facilities at Inverloch on Anderson Inlet.

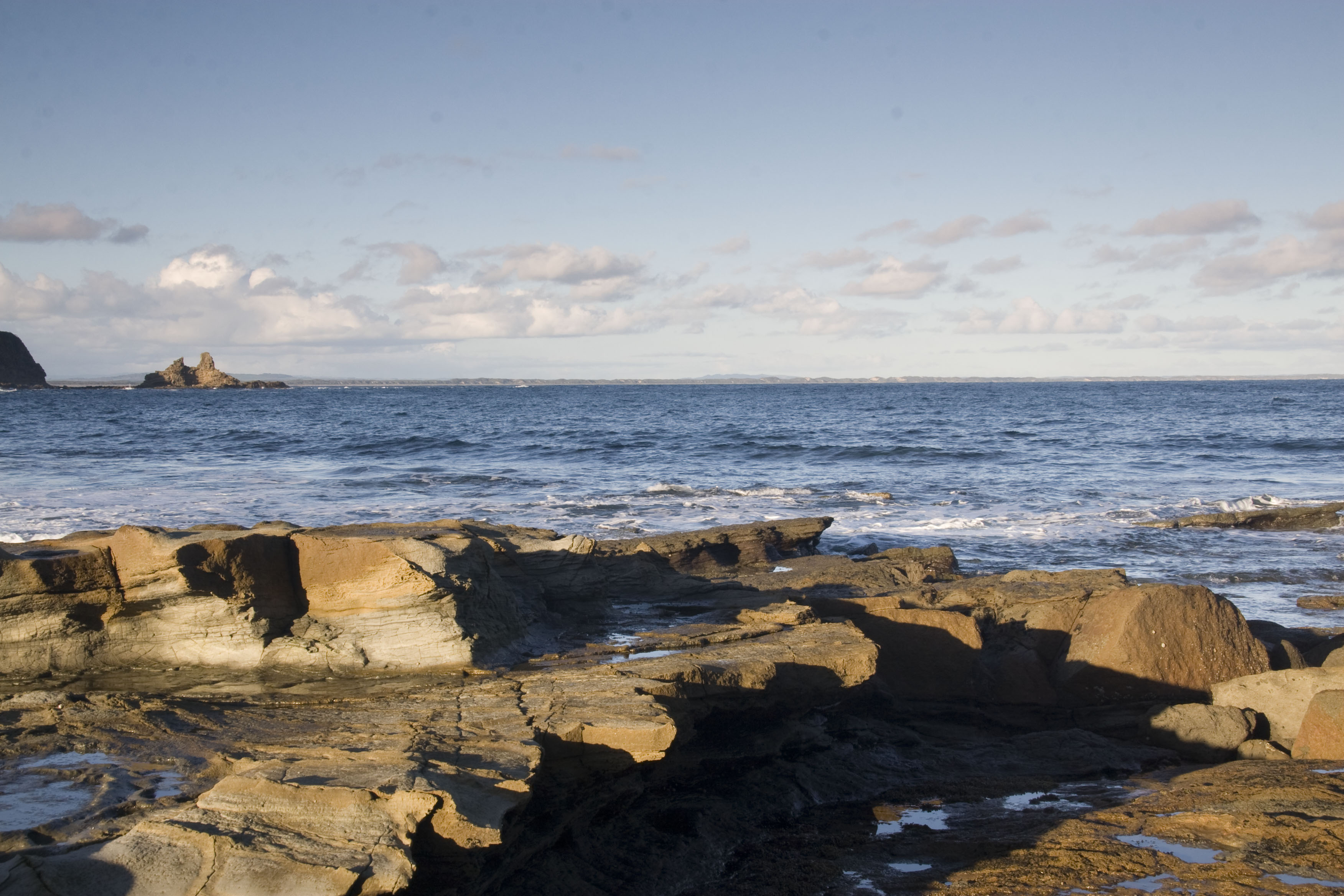
Bunurong Marine National Park with eagles nest in the distance

=== Eagles Nest ===
Eagles Nest is a large rock structure adjacent to the coastline that resembles the top half of a map of Australia.

=== Fishing ===
Inverloch is very popular for surf and bay fishing. Anderson Inlet and Inverloch Surf Beach are popular for fishing and a good catch is usually found. Surf fishing usually produces fish such as Silver Trevally, King George Whiting, Flathead, Mullet and Juvenile Snapper (pinky). There are two boat launches on in Inverloch on Anderson Inlet.

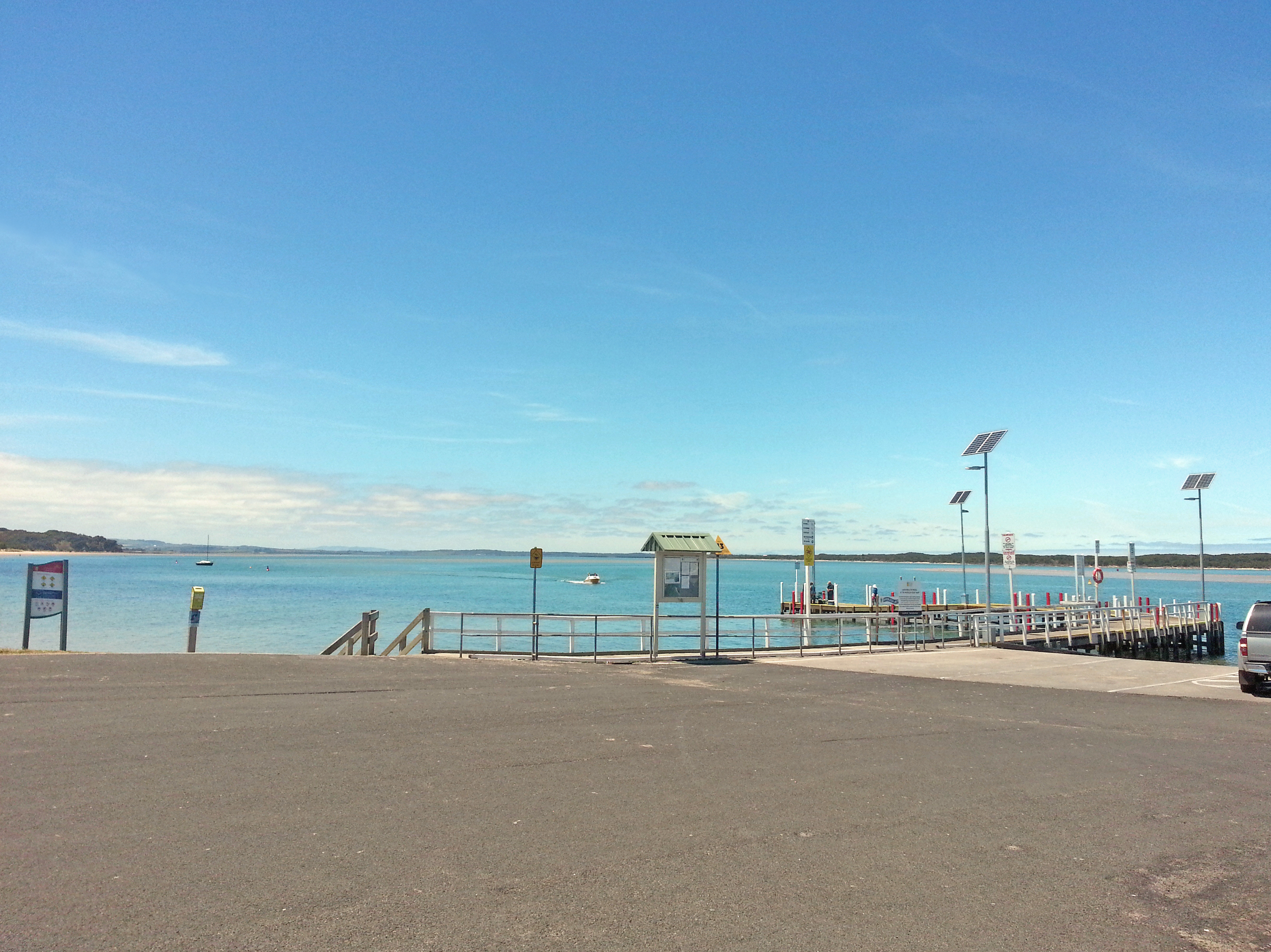
Jetty, Esplanade

== Climate ==
Inverloch's location on the north shore of Bass Strait gives it an oceanic climate, with the moderating effect of the ocean allowing a narrower temperature range throughout the year compared to other regions in Victoria. Average daily maximum temperatures range from 23.5 °C in summer to 13.5 in winter. Frost is rare, occurring on average 6 mornings a year. On 10 August 2005, Inverloch received its first snowfall since July 1951, with snow even settling briefly on the beach.

== Facilities ==
- Farmers' market – 3rd Sunday every month, The Glade, Esplanade
- Anderson Inlet
- Surf Lifesaving Club, Geroke Street
- Seashell Collecting is permitted on Inverloch coast from The Caves to Anderson Inlet
- Wyeth-McNamara Park – playground, shaded picnic areas, tables, barbecues, Ramsey Boulevard
- Melaleuca Links Golf Course, Bass Highway – 9 hole, par 3
- Inverloch Tennis Club, Pier Road
- Bunurong Marine Park – explore/snorkel, directly off Cape Paterson-Inverloch Road
- Bunurong Marine National Park – protected state park, explore/snorkel, Steps off Cape Paterson-Inverloch Road
- Screw Creek Walk (and Mangroves), eastern end of the Esplanade:
- Inverloch has large chain stores; RACV Inverloch Resort, farmers market 3rd Sunday every month, cafes, restaurants, pubs, motels, bed and breakfasts, three caravan parks and a foreshore camping reserve.
- Wonthaggi Museum – open Saturday mornings, Murray Street, Wonthaggi
- State Coal Mine – museum and tours, Garden Street, Wonthaggi
- Wonthaggi Hospital – Graham Street, Wonthaggi
- Rotary Centenary Park – Start location of parkrun, held weekly on Saturday mornings at 7.45am

== Localities ==
Other localities in this postcode:

- Pound Creek

Other localities nearby:

- Wonthaggi
- Leongatha
- Kongwak
- Venus Bay
