= Anderson Inlet =

Body of water near Inverloch, Victoria, Australia

Anderson Inlet (Toluncan)
- Andersons Inlet
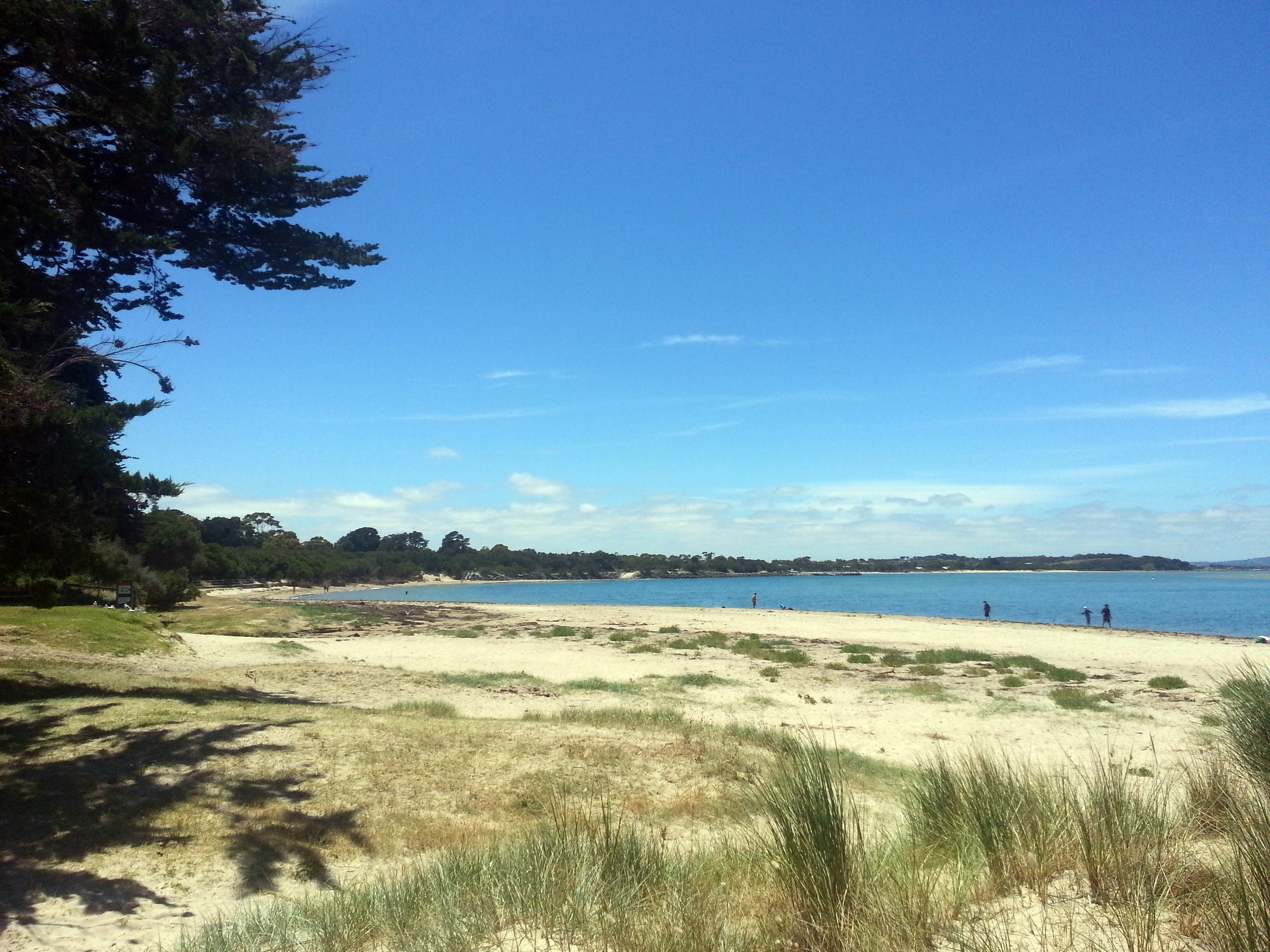
- The shoreline at Anderson Inlet

- Location in Victoria
- Location: South Gippsland, Victoria
- Coordinates: 38°38′49″S 145°46′59″E
- Primary inflows: Tarwin River
- Primary outflows: Bass Strait
- Basin countries: Australia
- Frozen: never
- Settlements: Inverloch

Anderson Inlet (Boonwurrung: Toluncan), sometimes incorrectly referred to as Andersons Inlet, is a shallow and dynamic estuary in South Gippsland, Victoria, Australia where the Tarwin River enters Bass Strait. It forms a 2,400-hectare (5,900-acre) almost enclosed bay next to the town of Inverloch, for which it provides a popular and protected beach. At low tide its intertidal mudflats provide important feeding habitat for migratory waders. It is also an important area for recreational fishing. It is named after Samuel Anderson, a pioneer explorer who was the first European to settle in the area.

== Tourism ==
Inverloch is an important tourist town, with visitor numbers swelling in the summer months due to the coastal lifestyle and proximity to Melbourne. Anderson Inlet's popularity is hinged on the almost-enclosed bay, making it a protected beach with safe swimming. At low tide the surf beach can be accessed on foot around the western headland. Anderson Inlet is also a popular recreational boating area with a boat ramp jetty. Because of its tidal nature, the areas where vessels can operate is restricted for the safety of the tourists as the depth of the water varies. Knowledge of the inlet is a must to cross the bar and the operators of vessels are required to carry tide tables while going out in the water.

Anderson Inlet is also a base for many walking and cycling trails including the Screw Creek Nature Trail and the Bass Coast Rail Trail which is Victoria's only coastal rail trail. The inlet is close to national parks including the Anderson Inlet Coastal Reserve and the Bunurong Marine and Coastal Park.

== Birds ==
Anderson Inlet is classified by BirdLife International as an Important Bird Area. It supports internationally significant numbers (up to over 6,000 individuals) of red-necked stint. It has also been known to support the critically endangered orange-bellied parrot, with six birds seen there in 1998 and two in 1999.

== Gallery ==
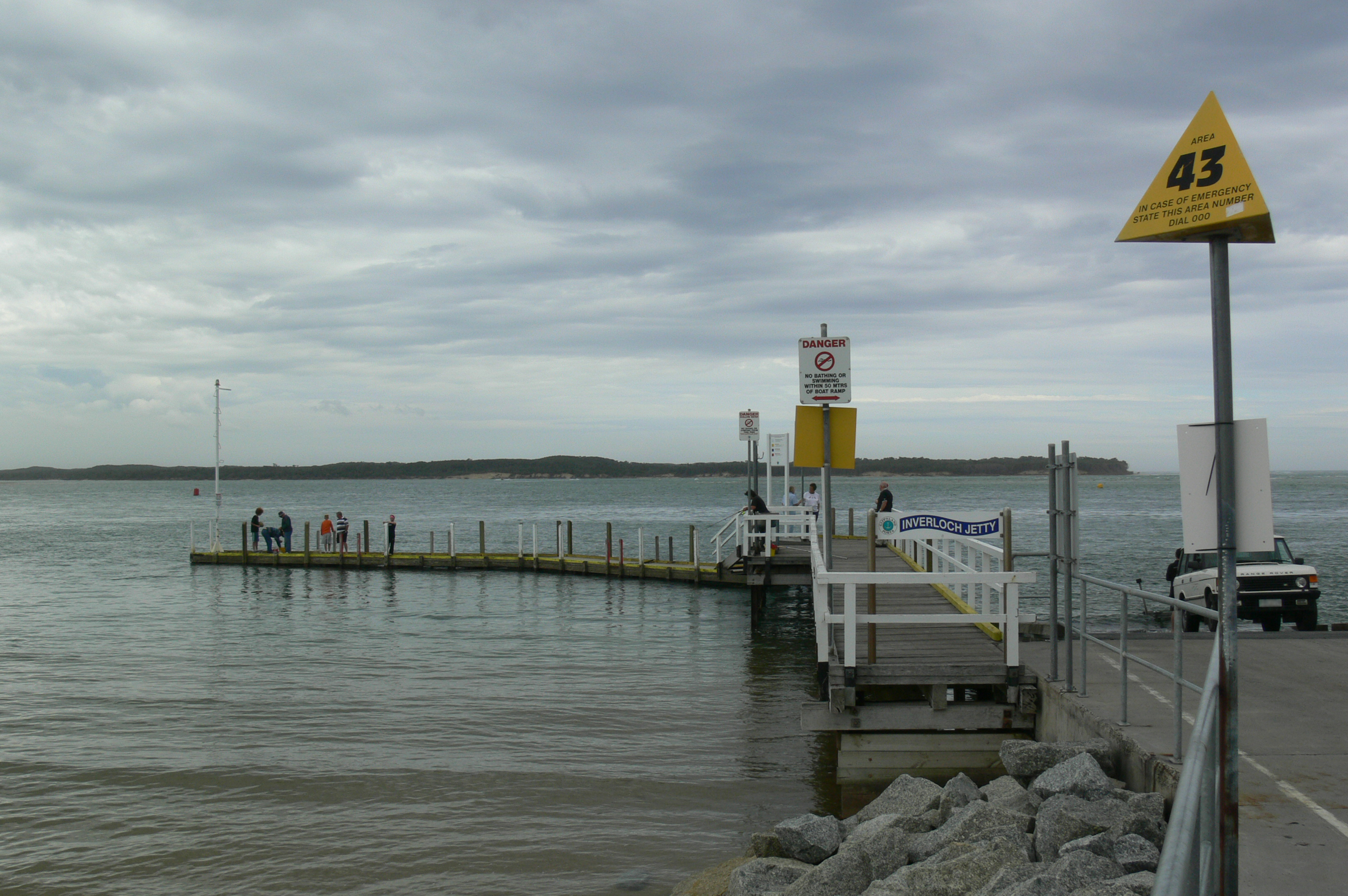
The jetty on the inlet at Inverloch during high tide

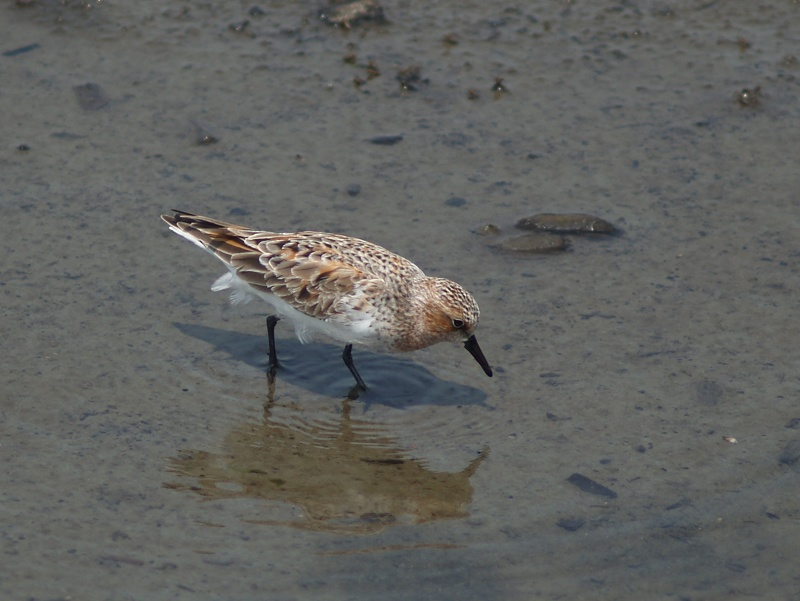
Anderson Inlet's intertidal mudflats are of world importance for red-necked stints
