= Tarwin River =

Tarwin
- Location of the Tarwin River mouth in Victoria
- Native name: Tarwin (Boonwurrung); Toulerm (Boonwurrung)

Location
- Country: Australia
- State: Victoria
- Region: South East Coastal Plain (IBRA), South Gippsland
- Local government areas: South Gippsland Shire, Baw Baw Shire

Physical characteristics
- Source: Strzlecki Ranges
- 2nd source: Tarwin River East Branch
  - location: near the locality of Dollar
  - elevation: 253 m (830 ft)
- 3rd source: Tarwin River West Branch
  - location: west of Mirboo North
  - elevation: 91 m (299 ft)
- Source confluence: East and West branches of the Tarwin River
  - location: west of Meeniyan
  - coordinates: 37°57′39″S 146°20′2″E
  - elevation: 17 m (56 ft)
- Mouth: Anderson Inlet, Bass Strait
  - location: Venus Bay
  - coordinates: 38°41′3″S 145°50′9″E
  - elevation: 0 m (0 ft)
- Length: 36 km (22 mi)

Basin features
- River system: West Gippsland catchment
- Tributaries
  - left: Wild Dog Creek (Victoria), Berry's Creek (Victoria), Wilkur Creek (Victoria)
  - right: Stony Creek (Victoria), Bridge Creek (Victoria)

The Tarwin River is a perennial river of the West Gippsland catchment, in the South Gippsland region of the Australian state of Victoria. The Tarwin River is the primary river system within South Gippsland Shire and has a catchment area of approximately 1,500 square kilometres (580 sq mi), predominantly rural with small pockets of residential land use. It flows south from the Strzlecki Ranges and discharges in the eastern reaches of Anderson Inlet, a shallow estuary connected to Bass Strait.

== Course and features ==
Formed by the confluence of the Tarwin River East Branch that drains the southwestern slopes of the Strzlecki Ranges from an elevation of 253 metres (830 ft) AHD and the Tarwin River West Branch that drains the southern slopes of the Strzlecki Ranges from a northerly point at an elevation of 91 metres (299 ft) AHD, the Tarwin River rises near the locale of Tarwin, west of Meeniyan.

The east branch of the river rises below the locale of Dollar, then heads north through Tarwin East and on to Mirboo before heading south through a valley, breaking out on to cleared farmland north of Dumbalk where the river is up to 12 metres (39 ft) wide with slow flowing water when not in flood; and then continues south. The west branch of the river rises as a number of tributaries on the southern slopes of the Strzelecki Ranges at the south of Mount Worth State Park. The western branch of the river flows through mostly steep, cleared farmlands, fed by six minor tributaries as it flows south, east of Leongatha and towards Meeniyan, generally through flat and rolling farmland.

The two branches then form as the Tarwin River, and flows generally south and then west by south, joined by two minor tributaries, through flat open river flats, passing around Tarwin Lower, flooding many local roads and then flowing into an extensive estuary and reaching its river mouth, emptying into Andersons Inlet, which flows into Bass Strait, near the township of Venus Bay. The lower reaches of the Tarwin River can be affected by tidal influences. From its highest elevation including the east and west branches of the river, the Tarwin River descends 253 metres (830 ft) over its combined 82-kilometre (51 mi) course.

== Etymology ==
In the Aboriginal Boonwurrung language the river is given two names: Tarwin, meaning "thirsty", and Toulerm, meaning "gum".

It is a popular fishing river, with the river running with a species of fish known as "elephant fish" every season.

The river was named from an Aboriginal word darwhin.

== See also ==
- List of rivers of Australia
