= Jaget =

Jaget may refer to:

- Jaget (Norwegian game show), the Norwegian adaptation of the British game show The Chase
- Jaget (Norwegian TV series), the Norwegian adaptation of the British reality television series Celebrity Hunted
