= Louisa Clarke =

Louisa Clarke stars in the hit Channel 4 television show Hunted. Hunted is a British reality television programme whose first series ran in 2015.

== Professional life ==
- Clarke served for 10 years as a military intelligence officer in the British Army.
- She is author of the book Callsign Whisky documenting her operations in Afghanistan.
- She is a deputy on Channel 4's series Hunted. Clarke started the show from season 2.
- When not filming Hunted, Clarke is an executive coach and trainer based in south west England.
