= Hunted (Australian TV series) =

Australian reality television series

- Also known as: Hunted Australia
- Genre: Reality
- Based on: Hunted by: Kelly Webb-Lamb; Tim Whitwell; Matt Bennett
- Country of origin: Australia
- Original language: English
- No. of seasons: 3
- No. of episodes: 31

Production
- Executive producers: Marty Benson; Kate Feely; Tim Ali
- Producer: Natalie Cattach
- Camera setup: Multi-camera
- Running time: 47–78 minutes
- Production company: Endemol Shine Australia

Original release
- Network: Network 10
- Release: 17 July 2022 – present

Hunted is an Australian reality television series based on the British reality television series of the same name. The first season premiered on Network 10 on 17 July 2022.

== Production ==
Casting for a second season was announced in August 2022, which was filmed in Melbourne between 20 February–15 March 2023 and first premiered on 17 July 2023. In October 2023, the series was renewed for a third season, subtitled Million Dollar Heist, which premiered on 12 August 2024.

== Premise ==
The show is a competition series that centres on nine teams of two as they are "fugitives" on the run from highly skilled hunters. Fugitives are released from a common location at the start of the hunt, with an overnight bag and $500 ($200 cash and $300 on a debit card). Each pair attempts to use their wits to evade capture for 21 days in the state of Victoria.

Meanwhile, a team of hunters attempt to locate and capture the fugitives using replicated "powers of the state" such as ANPR and CCTV. The hunters are also given access to the fugitive's bank accounts and phone records. 24 hours before the end of the hunt, the remaining fugitives call a given phone number to access information about the "extraction point", a location they must reach by the end of the hunt. While the hunters are not informed of the extraction point, fugitive's current locations are disclosed to the hunters once they call the phone number. Any fugitives able to evade capture and make it to the extraction point in time win a share of the grand prize of $100,000.

The format was changed slightly for the third season to begin with a heist, with the season subtitled Million Dollar Heist and having a similar premise to The Heist. The contestants participated in a heist to steal up to A$1,000,000 before beginning their time on the run, with the potential prize money for the series consisting of the money collected during the heist.

== Hunters ==
=== Headquarters ===
- Dr David Craig – Chief (seasons 1–2)
- Ben Owen – Deputy, Intelligence (Former Chief Hunter on Hunted UK and former Hunter on Hunted USA)
- Reece Dewar OAM – Deputy, Operations (seasons 1–2), Chief (season 3–)
- Jason Edelstein – Lead, Cyber
- Dr Karla Lopez – Forensic Psychologist
- Graeme Simpfendorfer – Lead Intelligence
- Kerri Collins – Lead Intelligence Analyst
- Vikki Grouios – Ethical Hacker
- Carter Smith – Open Source Intelligence
- Steph Jensen – Open Source Intelligence
- Jay Banerji – Digital Forensics
- Tamara Ruggeiro – Intelligence Officer
- Leigha Fraser – Senior Principal Analyst

=== Ground Hunters ===
- Jason Spivey
- Michelle Corlett
- Luke Andrews
- Marco O’Hehir
- Clancy Roberts (season 1)
- Howie Dawson
- Kellie Andrews
- Rhonda Murray (season 1)
- Jeremy Hargreaves (season 1)
- Kim Culpin
- Niki Paterson
- Zak Rogers
- Sean Kilsby

== Contestants ==
=== Season 1 ===
Eighteen fugitives were chosen and began the hunt at Federation Square in Melbourne. The Inverloch Coastal Reserve in Inverloch served as the extraction point.

Fugitive	Relationship to teammate	Age	Hometown	Result
Jacob "Jake" Rozario (Note: Jake and Rob were a duo when the hunt began, but they voluntarily split up on Day 19. Jake was caught on Day 20. Rob later made it to the extraction point.)	Friends	31	Scarborough, WA	Caught on Day 20
Robert "Rob" Harneiss	Friends	33	Perth, WA	Winners
Stathi Vamvoulidis (Note: Stathi and Matt were a duo when the hunt began, but they split up when Matt was caught on Day 19. Stathi later made it to the extraction point.)	Friends	35	Parkville, VIC	Winners
Matt Bergin	Friends	35	Keilor East, VIC	Caught on Day 19
Lavinia White (Note: Nick and Lavinia were a duo when the hunt began, but they split up when Nick was caught on Day 18. Lavinia was caught later the same day.)	Engaged	27	Bondi, NSW	Caught on Day 18
Nicholas "Nick" Pembroke	Engaged	30	Bondi, NSW	Caught on Day 18
Puneet Gulati	Friends	33	Craigieburn, VIC	Caught on Day 17
Kris Chand	Friends	34	Craigieburn, VIC	Caught on Day 17
Sonny-Joe Flanagan	Friends	37	Ultimo, NSW	Caught on Day 10
Grace Avery	Friends	26	Glebe, NSW	Caught on Day 10
Karen Harding	Aunt & Niece	56	Williamstown, SA	Caught on Day 9
Brittany Fleet	Aunt & Niece	27	Adelaide, SA	Caught on Day 9
Courtney Jones	Friends	22	Mount Annan, NSW	Caught on Day 8
Derek Nannup	Friends	24	Surry Hills, NSW	Caught on Day 8
Erina-Lea Peters	Friends	38	Robina, QLD	Caught on Day 4
Jess Johnston	Friends	28	Bundall, QLD	Caught on Day 4
Angie Collins (Note: Angie and Michelle were a duo when the hunt began, but they split up when Michelle was caught on Day 2. Angie was caught later the same day.)	Sisters-in-law	56	Mermaid Beach, QLD	Caught on Day 3
Michelle Collins	Sisters-in-law	53	Pelican Waters, QLD	Caught on Day 3

=== Season 2 ===
Twenty contestants were chosen and began at North Wharf, Docklands, in the Port of Melbourne. The Melbourne Cricket Ground in Yarra Park, Melbourne served as the extraction point.

Fugitive	Relationship to teammate	Age	Hometown	Result
Jordan Hutchinson (Note: Tharren and Jordan were a duo when the hunt began, but they split up when Tharren was caught on Day 21 at the extraction point. Jordan was caught later the same day.)	Father & Son	29	Ringwood, VIC	Caught on Day 21
Tharren Hutchinson	Father & Son	52	Narromine, NSW	Caught on Day 21
Ed Abbott (Note: Jimi and Ed were a duo when the hunt began, but they voluntarily split up on Day 19. Ed was caught on Day 20. Jimi later made it to the extraction point.)	Friends	29	Waratah East, NSW	Caught on Day 20
James "Jimi" Love	Friends	31	Wyoming, NSW	Winners
Holly Colvin (Note: Holly and Josh were a duo when the hunt began, but they voluntarily split up on Day 19. Josh was caught later the same day. Holly later made it to the extraction point.)	Couple	23	Footscray, VIC	Winners
Joshua "Josh" Pineda	Couple	25	Footscray, VIC	Caught on Day 19
Bayan Massoudi	Friends	43	Subiaco, WA	Caught on Day 16
Eesha Patel	Friends	32	Dianella, WA	Caught on Day 16
Sonja Marcelline	Friends	41	Robina, QLD	Caught on Day 14
Elerrina McPherson	Friends	38	Innes Park, QLD	Caught on Day 14
Byron Adu	Siblings	37	Abbotsford, VIC	Caught on Day 10
Tanase Adu	Siblings	36	Truganina, VIC	Caught on Day 10
Callum Charlesworth	Friends	27	South Morang, VIC	Caught on Day 7
Ben Page	Friends	26	South Morang, VIC	Caught on Day 7
Glenn Azar (Note: Glenn and Taylah were a duo when the hunt began, but they split up when Taylah was caught on Day 6. Glenn was caught later the same day.)	Trainer & Boxer	50	Newstead, QLD	Caught on Day 6
Taylah Robertson	Trainer & Boxer	24	Hamilton, QLD	Caught on Day 6
Megan Colwell (Note: Megan and Gracie were a duo when the hunt began, but they split up when Gracie was caught on Day 4. Megan was caught later the same day.)	Aunt & Niece	46	Castle Hill, QLD	Caught on Day 4
Gracie Dale	Aunt & Niece	22	Bohie Plains, QLD	Caught on Day 4
Kelly "Kel" Nash	Friends	59	Mornington, VIC	Caught on Day 3
Cathrine "Cath" McCallig	Friends	54	Brighton East, VIC	Caught on Day 3

=== Season 3 ===
18 fugitives were selected and were split into two teams of nine; one that had to act as bank-robbers and steal one million dollars from the bank of Ballarat, while the other team would act as get-away drivers. The bank-robbers were driven to Geelong where they met up with their partners and the hunt began. The Gem Pier in Williamstown served as the extraction point.

Fugitive	Relationship to teammate	Age	Hometown	Result
Andrew "Andy" Dunt	Husband and wife	44	Adelaide, SA	Winner
Deborah "Deb" Dunt	Husband and wife	41	Adelaide, SA	Caught on Day 20
Chelsea Hancock	Friends	26	Devonport, TAS	Caught on Day 20
Romanee Virgara	Friends	25	Adelaide Hills, SA	Caught on Day 20
Akec Makur Chuot	Friends	31	Seddon, VIC	Caught on Day 17
Joe White	Friends	38	Altona, VIC	Caught on Day 17
Kaylie Newell	Friends	30	Port Stephens, NSW	Caught on Day 15
Tony Sullens	Friends	58	Central Coast, NSW	Caught on Day 15
Ben Vasiliou	Married couple	38	Langwarrin, VIC	Caught on Day 13
Luke Vasiliou	Married couple	36	Langwarrin, VIC	Caught on Day 13
Shelli Green	Cousins	61	Dunsborough, WA	Caught on Day 13
Ondeane Newman	Cousins	49	Perth, WA	Caught on Day 13
Jayde Heath	Friends	24	Gold Coast, QLD	Caught on Day 6
Tayla Hunt	Friends	24	Gold Coast, QLD	Caught on Day 6
Joanna Stibbe	Engaged couple	25	Gold Coast, QLD	Caught on Day 4
Lee Carter	Engaged couple	33	Gold Coast, QLD	Caught on Day 4
Bobek "Bobby" Ivanoff	Father & daughter	56	Sydney, NSW	Caught on Day 2
Tanisha Ivanoff	Father & daughter	20	Sydney, NSW	Caught on Day 2

== Episodes ==
=== Season 1 ===
No. overall	No. in season	Title	Timeline	Original release date
1	1	"Episode 1"	Days 1–2	17 July 2022
The fugitives are stripped of any electronics they have, then are driven in two black vans to Federation Square in Melbourne. The back doors of the vans open and fugitives are released. The hunters spot Jake and Rob running east of the river. Rob shaves his beard and puts on a wig, then the two disguise themselves as tradies. Erina-Lea and Jess go to a train station and the hunters spot them on CCTV footage. Derek and Courtney enter a taxi to escape the Melbourne CBD, while Brittany and Karen board a train and Kris and Puneet onto a bus. Erina-Lea and Jess, the only fugitives left to leave the CBD, are spotted at a zebra crossing. They hitch a lift from a passerby, then the hunters lose track of them. Jake and Rob are picked up by their friend, Cordy. Nick and Lavinia are driven by their friend to a hotel. The hunters rewatch footage of the van drop-off and decide to target Michelle and Angie, who they notice is limping. They meet their friend, Jackie, who plans on taking them to her home in Geelong. Digital forensic Jay Banerji hacks into Angie's phone messages and notices they plan to be picked up by Jackie, then find her address and phone number. Jackie suggests that Angie and Michelle stay at her house and although Michelle opposes the idea, the two decide to anyway. The HQ hunters accidentally call Jackie from Angie's phone. Jackie tells the two fugitives and Angie realises the hunters are catching up to them, so Jackie calls them back, but they do not pick up. Jake and Rob bait the hunters by posting an image of them to a coffee shop's social media. Erina-Lea and Jess' friend drops them off at a rural campsite outside of Beechworth to stay. Kris and Puneet stay at an acquaintance's house overnight, Stathi and Matt stay off the grid, and Derek and Courtney take out $150 from an ATM. Michelle becomes extremely paranoid, so she and Angie leave the property, but later return. The following morning, the ground hunters station themselves at the end of Jackie's street. They decide Jackie will drive away from her home alone and pick the two fugitives up on the other side of the bloc. The hunters follow Jackie's car, as Angie and Michelle escape unseen. Angie and Michelle see Jackie's car and run to get in, however the hunters, who are right behind Jackie, get out and chase them. Michelle is caught, however Angie gets into Jackie's car and escapes. The hunters notice bank activity from Jess and find the car they are travelling in via CCTV footage, then follow the vehicle. Erina-Lea and Jess get the manager of a caravan park to give them an unpowered site. Two ground hunters speak to the manager, who gives them their location, so the hunters go to their tent.
2	2	"Episode 2"	Days 2–3	18 July 2022
The ground hunters speak to a camper, who says Erina-Lea and Jess have left the site. Erina-Lea and Jess, worried the hunters are close to them, stay in local resident Kay's shed. The hunters decide to focus on Angie instead. Jackie's phone is tracked near Federation Square and Angie is seen on CCTV purchasing a ticket to Box Hill, but the hunters lose her and she goes to her friend Stella's house. The hunters find a notebook of contact numbers in Michelle's backpack and head to Stella's house, which is the closest to Angie's last known location. The ground hunters arrive Stella's home and ask that Stella lets them in. She relents, getting Angie caught. The next morning, the hunters worry over the silence from Stathi and Matt, who go to their friend's house on the Mornington Peninsula. They tell their friend to use their card to buy a coffee in order to bait the hunters. Rob shaves his head to disguise himself in a wig. Erina-Lea and Jess worry that Kay's house is too close to the campsite. The HQ hunters begin making calls to catch the pair and a sighting of them near the campsite is reported. Stathi's friend purchases some food with their debit card and the hunters watch the CCTV footage, which neither Stathi nor Matt appear on. Meanwhile, Karen and Brittany are staying at an Airbnb overnight in Emerald with Brittany's mother, Sonya, who has flown their belongings in from South Australia. The hunters discover a group chat between the three and believe Sonya has flown to Victoria to help. When the hunters realise Sonya has a flight booked to leave Melbourne later that day, they realise she has already helped Karen and Brittany. The hunters discover the Airbnb booking under Sonya's name as Brittany and Karen's Airbnb host, Carmel, drives them to an ATM. Although the ATM does not work, the hunters are notified of bank activity and their location. The hunters then spot them taking money out of another nearby ATM.
3	3	"Episode 3"	Days 3–5	19 July 2022
Karen and Brittany manage to get back into Carmel's car and lose the hunters. The HQ hunters become annoyed over Lavinia and Nick, who have been off the grid. Puneet and Kris are watched withdrawing the remainder of their cash, while the hunters assume that Stathi and Matt plan to hide in rural locations. Karen and Brittany stay at a friend's holiday house at Cape Paterson. Meanwhile, the hunters begin to investigate Carmel. Erina-Lea and Jess spot a drone in the air and Jess runs into the bush, while Erina-Lea stays in Kay's house. When she realises the drone is not owned by the hunters, Erina-Lea goes to find Jess at the same time the hunters arrive. They meet up before the hunters find them. The hunters go to Carmel's house to interrogate her. Carmel pretends that Sonya was a woman named Sandra, claims to not know Karen or Brittany's name and states they left in a red car. Chief Craig takes charge of the interrogation and Carmel tells him that they left for the airport, then gives him her phone number, which allows the hunters to find the location she dropped off Karen and Brittany. Carmel then refuses to cooperate with the hunters, meanwhile Karen and Brittany hide on a beach. Jake and Rob stay in the countryside, while Derek and Courtney continue to hide in inner Melbourne, using their Aboriginal connections to their benefit. They go to a clothing shop they have previously become friends with the owner online and request to stay there for a while and equip the owner as help. On the shop's social media, they find a post with Derek and Courtney in it. A ground hunter in a car and one on foot begin closing in on Erina-Lea and Jess, who decide to leave Kay's house and go into the bush. Erina-Lea gets caught followed by Jess after she trips. On the fifth day, the hunters go to the store Derek and Courtney were hiding in and the owner tells them that they have been taken by an associate of the store's. The hunters visit the house while they are out, however later return. Derek and Courtney escape down an alleyway and the house owner gives the ground hunters a sly note from Derek and Courtney.
4	4	"Episode 4"	Days 5–8	24 July 2022
In Brunswick, the hunters realise they have lost Derek and Courtney as night approaches. Derek and Courtney return to Sophie's house to sleep, although they worry about being caught there. Karen and Brittany fail to get strangers to take them to Phillip Island, so use a phonebox to get their friend, Ross, to pick them up. The hunters find a mention of Ross on Karen's phone. In the morning, the hunters ambush Derek and Courtney at Sophie and Sienna's house, but they manage to get away. Puneet and Kris continue staying at their friend's house, while Lavinia and Nick stay in the bush, and Jacob and Robert continue disguising themselves. The hunters become annoyed at Stathi and Matt, who have made no contact. Stathi and Matt travel to the outer suburbs of Geelong in disguise to retrieve help from their friends, Shane and Katherine, who provide them with a kombi van, food and shelter at a church in Newstead. In Wonthaggi, Karen and Brittany have arrived at Ross' house. They visit a local Woolworths and purchase items with their card, instantly alerting Hunter HQ who deploy the hunters to their location. The hunters arrive at Ross' house to find it empty. Meanwhile, Derek and Courtney are driven to Sienna's friend's home, Jackie and Ray in Lalor. Aware that Sienna helped them escape, Hunter HQ access her phone records showing calls made to Jackie. Confident that Jackie is hiding Derek and Courtney, the house is placed under surveillance. Under pressure, Derek and Courtney hide at a local park until Ray returns to collect them who then drives around the area on the lookout for the hunters. They are caught just as they arrive back at the house. The hunters go to Stathi's residence to interrogate Shane and Katherine and discover a note with codes that they have used to communicate with Stathi and Matt. Figuring out that Stathi and Matt are likely to seek shelter at Katherine's church, the hunters head to Newstead.
5	5	"Episode 5"	Days 8–9	25 July 2022
In Newstead, the hunters arrive at the church to find that Stathi and Matt are not there. Confused by their elaborate plans and finding no new information from the occupants of the church, the hunters decide to postpone the hunt for Stathi and Matt. Stathi and Matt later arrive at the church and are informed by the occupants of the hunters arrival earlier in the day. Fearful that their contacts and their kombi van have been compromised, they abandon their plan to stay at the church and leave on foot. In Wonthaggi, at a bus stop waiting for ride to Cowes, Karen and Brittany discover wanted posters of them posted around town by the hunters who are now tracking them down. They make it to Phillip Island and make plans to take a ferry to their next destination, unaware the hunters have been tipped off on their location by their bus driver. Meanwhile, Kris and Puneet and Nick and Lavinia evade the hunters by continuously staying low and off-grid. The hunters decide to freeze Nick and Lavinia's bank card. Sonny-Joe and Grace continue with their strategy of throwing the hunters off by making multiple fake hotel and car hire bookings across Morwell and Rosedale while they continue to camp out 260km west in Ballarat. Also in Ballarat, Jake and Rob find work in a local hair salon to earn some extra money. They decide to taunt the hunters again by taking a selfie in front of the Olympic Rings at Lake Wendouree and posting it on social media to draw the hunters in. With the hunters closing in, Karen and Brittany realise they misread the ferry timetable. Uncomfortable with the thought of waiting for the next ferry, they decide to leave and hide at a campsite, narrowly avoiding capture just as the hunters arrive. The next morning, Karen and Brittany make a second attempt to leave Phillip Island, but are spotted by the same bus driver who calls the tip-off line which ultimately leads to their capture.
6	6	"Episode 6"	Days 9–12	26 July 2022
The hunters turn their attention to Jake and Rob after seeing their social media taunt. Believing they are still in Ballarat, the hunters comb the local streets for any clues. Meanwhile, Jake and Rob finish a shift at the Western Hotel in Ballarat. They decide to leave their bank card with the landlord, who uses the funds to shout the locals lunch, while they make their escape from Ballarat to draw the hunters away from them. At the same time, Sonny-Joe and Grace also make plans to leave Ballarat by train to Bacchus Marsh. The bank transactions at the Western Hotel alert Hunter HQ who sends the hunters to Ballarat Railway Station to intercept Jake and Rob. They narrowly escape just as the hunters arrive. As the hunters prepare to head to the Western Hotel to interrogate the landlord, they incidentally run into Sonny-Joe and Grace nearby and capture them after a short foot chase. The hunters return to the Western Hotel to interrogate the landlord who informs them that Jake and Rob have a burner phone and made phone calls. With this information, Hunter HQ analyse the telephone towers to identify the Jake and Rob's number. After identifying their number, the hunters track Jake and Rob to their friend Neville, who lives in St Albans Park. Back in Melbourne, Kris and Puneet begin planning to use other networks outside of their community whilst the toll of being on the run for 11 days begins to take effect on Nick and Lavinia and Stathi and Matt. The hunters arrive at Neville's house the next morning to seek information on Jake and Rob's whereabouts. During the interrogation, Neville messages Jake and Rob, having lunch at a local café, alerting them of the hunters. Realising the phone is being tracked, Jake and Rob turn the phone off so it can no longer be traced and quickly leave for a farm near Werribee. The hunters are unable to gain much information from Neville and leave frustrated. The hunters focus their attention on penetrating Kris and Puneet's network. They decide to place an intercept on Kris' stepfather Jeff's phone believing they will contact him for help. Meanwhile, Kris and Puneet make plans to drive to Harcourt to stay with Jeff's friend Graeme. Unable to find directions, they borrow a stranger's phone to contact Jeff for directions. The hunters are alerted to the call, then contact the stranger for information on Kris and Puneet. On arrival at Graeme's property in Harcourt, Kris and Puneet believe their location has been compromised and seek help finding an alternative location with one of Graeme's friends as the hunters close in on Graeme's property.
7	7	"Episode 7"	Days 13–18	31 July 2022
On arrival at Graeme's property, the hunters discover Kris and Puneet are not on site. Fearing their address has been compromised, Kris and Puneet head back to Melbourne to retreat back into the security of the local Indian community, narrowly missing the hunters on the way. After spending most of the time off-grid, Nick and Lavinia decide to stay at a farm owned by Nick's friend Paddy in Mansfield. Combing through Nick's contacts, Hunter HQ identifies Paddy as their best lead to find Nick and Lavinia. The next day, the hunters visit Paddy's farm. Paddy then alerts Nick and Lavinia at a nearby winery, forcing them to flee the area with Paddy's ute. They drive towards Warragul unaware that Hunter HQ placed an ANPR tracker alert on the vehicle. Hunter HQ decides to follow up on old leads and shift their attention back to Kris and Puneet, who have arranged a stay with a friend Puneet D. Hunter HQ places an intercept on Puneet D's phone where the hunters track them to a home in Pakenham. Puneet D is alerted to the hunters as they attempt to hack into his Gmail account forcing Kris and Puneet to flee to another safe home. Tracking them to Oakleigh, the hunters capture Kris and Puneet in an apartment. Meanwhile, a frustrated and paranoid Nick and Lavinia continue to drive towards Warragul. Low on funds, they attempt to withdraw cash, unaware that their bank card has been frozen by the hunters. The hunters begin to descend onto Warragul whilst Nick and Lavinia abandon their ute and stay overnight at a local hotel. The next day, Nick and Lavinia put on disguises and head to Warragul train station to head back to Melbourne. With no trains currently available, they decide to wait for the express bus to Southern Cross Station. On boarding the bus, Lavinia spots the hunters arriving and Nick immediately gets off and runs. The hunters run after, and ultimately capture, Nick after a chase across Warragul. Lavinia meanwhile stays on the bus alone which departs Warragul station.
8	8	"Episode 8"	Days 18–19	1 August 2022
After Nick is captured, the hunters search through his possessions to find out where Lavinia is going. Hunter HQ tracks the bus heading towards Southern Cross Station and sends the hunters there believing that Lavinia will be on the bus instead of alighting at the only other stop at Drouin. On arrival at Southern Cross Station, Lavinia is captured by the hunters. Meanwhile, Stathi and Matt head to Daylesford to attend the ChillOut Festival, a popular LGBTIQA+ festival in the town. At Hunter HQ, the hunters discover emails between Stathi and a popular drag star Dean with Stathi appealing to Dean for help. The hunters begin tracking Dean and place intercepts on his phone. Outside of Daylesford, Stathi calls Dean and leaves a coded message about a meeting somewhere "where they first met Avery." Despite the risks of being in a busy location, Stathi and Matt are confident about the community having their backs. In West Footscray, Jake and Rob make plans to disguise themselves in drag and separate for the final days before the extraction. In disguise, they successfully mingle with the crowd at a local bar and find new places to stay. With the hunters scrambling to find any information on "Avery", Stathi and Matt make plans with Dean to meet at a laneway behind the Daylesford Hotel. The hunters are deployed to Daylesford to look for Dean. They spot Dean waiting outside the front of the Daylesford Hotel instead of the laneway behind as planned. Worried about being spotted by the hunters, Stathi and Matt spread out and observe Dean and the surroundings from safe distances. A desperate Stathi risks his cover to ask pubgoers in a beer garden to tell Dean to meet him two blocks up the street. As Dean makes his way to the back of the pub, the hunters lose sight of him and continue driving around the local streets. They spot Matt behind a tree who also spots the hunter's car approaching. The hunters chase after Matt while Stathi runs in the opposite direction. Matt is eventually captured after tripping, but Stathi manages to escape into a safe home after seeking help from a local.
9	9	"Episode 9"	Days 20–21	2 August 2022
With 27 hours remaining until the extraction, Hunter HQ hones in on Jake and Rob's contact Cordy and make plans to intercept should they make contact with her. In Daylesford, the hunters scout the ChillOut Festival parade for any sign of Stathi blending in with the crowd. Stathi continues to lay low after witnessing Matt being chased by the hunters the previous day and gets a lift out of Daylesford. With the hunters unable to locate Stathi at the festival and no leads on Jake and Rob, Hunter HQ begins positioning the hunters in strategic locations around Melbourne to intercept the Fugitives when the extraction call is made. Hiding near Melton, Jake recruits a driver to take him to a public pay phone whilst in Camberwell Rob disguises himself before making the call for the extraction point. Staying in South Yarra with a friend, Stathi arranges a taxi to take him near the extraction point. At 1pm, the extraction point is revealed as the Inverloch Coastal Reserve. The hunters are alerted to the Fugitives' locations and begin examining CCTV footage and sending hunters to the locations. The hunters head to South Yarra to intercept Stathi who escapes in the pre-arranged taxi to Cape Paterson. Concerned about strangers taking him to the extraction point, Jake heads to Cordy's residence in Hawthorn East to hide and get driven to Inverloch the next day. Meanwhile, Rob secures a lift to Inverloch from strangers. The hunters identify Rob through his disguise on the CCTV footage and see he has discarded his burner phone, but are unable to immediately identify the number plate of the car that he leaves in due to the sun's glare. Believing he is heading to Cordy's home to stay, the hunters are deployed to her address with the plan to intercept Rob. As the hunters arrive at Cordy's residence. Jake is forced to flee on foot through neighbouring yards and hides in the bushes. The hunters spot footprints which confirm their suspicions about Jake or Rob hiding at Cordy's. With nowhere left to hide and the hunters circling, a foot chase across a nearby park ends in Jake's capture. Rob is dropped off in Loch where he secures accommodation for the night whilst Stathi is dropped off and secures accommodation at Cape Paterson. At Hunter HQ, the taxi number plate that picked up Stathi is identified and the hunters begin heading to Cape Paterson. With 3 hours left until extraction, the hunters are deployed to the Inverloch area to intercept Rob and Stathi. Stathi is dropped off outside Inverloch with the plan to hike the rest of the way whilst Rob waits until near the extraction time to make a final dash. The hunters identify Inverloch as the likely extraction point and send a chopper to the area. As Rob and Stathi approach the extraction point, the hunters spot a red helicopter landing on the beach confirming the extraction point. The hunters land in a nearby oval and begin the final pursuit to intercept the Fugitives. Rob makes it to the extraction point first, followed by Stathi who makes it just in time. The extraction helicopter leaves before the hunters can intercept confirming Rob and Stathi as the winners.

=== Season 2 ===
No. overall	No. in season	Title	Timeline	Original release date
10	1	"Episode 1"	Days 1–3	17 July 2023
The fugitives are stripped of any electronics they have, then board a boat which travels to Docklands in Melbourne. The boat docked at the North Wharf in Docklands and the fugitives are released. The hunters target Glenn and Taylah, who travelled down Bourke Street and were spotted on CCTV. After an intercepted phone call reveals they are heading to Bendigo, the hunters arrive at their friend Gary's house, and track down his car, which has a random worker inside it. Day 2 is uneventful, except Fugitives Kelly and Catherine post 'Where's Wally'-like taunts online. After getting taunted online, the hunters next target Kelly and Catherine. They visit their friend's house, but the hunters work out where they are and stand around the house and ring the doorbell numerous times. Eventually, they try to run out, knowing the hunters are there, and are caught.
11	2	"Episode 2"	Days 3–4	18 July 2023
12	3	"Episode 3"	Days 4–5	19 July 2023
13	4	"Episode 4"	Days 5–7	23 July 2023
14	5	"Episode 5"	Days 7–9	24 July 2023
15	6	"Episode 6"	Days 9–12	25 July 2023
16	7	"Episode 7"	Days 13–14	30 July 2023
17	8	"Episode 8"	Days 15–17	31 July 2023
18	9	"Episode 9"	Days 17–18	1 August 2023
19	10	"Episode 10"	Days 18–20	6 August 2023
20	11	"Episode 11"	Days 20–21	7 August 2023

=== Season 3 ===
No. overall	No. in season	Title	Timeline	Original release date
21	1	"Episode 1"	Days 1–3	12 August 2024
The fugitives are stripped of any electronics they have,
22tv	2	"Episode 2"	Days 3–4	18 July 2023
12	3	"Episode 3"	Days 4–5	19 July 2023
13	4	"Episode 4"	Days 5–7	23 July 2023
14	5	"Episode 5"	Days 7–9	24 July 2023
15	6	"Episode 6"	Days 9–12	25 July 2023
16	7	"Episode 7"	Days 13–14	30 July 2023
17	8	"Episode 8"	Days 15–17	31 July 2023
18	9	"Episode 9"	Days 17–18	1 August 2023
19	10	"Episode 10"	Days 18–20	6 August 2023
20	11	"Episode 11"	Days 20–21	7 August 2023

== Ratings ==
=== Season 1 ===
No.	Title	Air date	Timeslot	Overnight ratings		Consolidated ratings		Total viewers	Ref(s)
No.	Title	Air date	Timeslot	Viewers	Rank	Viewers	Rank	Total viewers	Ref(s)
1	Episode 1	17 July 2022	Sunday 7:30 pm	619,000	3	598,000	3	1,217,000	
2	Episode 2	18 July 2022	Monday 7:30 pm	711,000	5	599,000	3	1,310,000	
3	Episode 3	19 July 2022	Tuesday 7:30 pm	569,000	7	556,000	4	1,125,000	
4	Episode 4	24 July 2022	Sunday 7:30 pm	550,000	6	490,000	4	1,040,000	
5	Episode 5	25 July 2022	Monday 7:30 pm	638,000	8	500,000	5	1,138,000	
6	Episode 6	26 July 2022	Tuesday 7:30 pm	594,000	7	546,000	5	1,140,000	
7	Episode 7	31 July 2022	Sunday 7:30 pm	492,000	8	490,000	6	982,000	
8	Episode 8	1 August 2022	Monday 7:30 pm	546,000	10	90,000	5	1,066,000	
9	Finale The Extraction	2 August 2022	Tuesday 7:30 pm	549,00 602,000	11 7	115,000 84,000	7 6	1,120,000 1,166,000	

=== Season 2 ===
No.	Title	Air date	Timeslot	Overnight ratings		Consolidated ratings		Total viewers	Ref(s)
No.	Title	Air date	Timeslot	Viewers	Rank	Viewers	Rank	Total viewers	Ref(s)
1	Episode 1	17 July 2023	Monday 7:30 pm	524,000	10	91,000	7	980,000	
2	Episode 2	18 July 2023	Tuesday 7:30 pm	472,000	9	73,000	9	849,000	
3	Episode 3	19 July 2023	Wednesday 7:30 pm	432,000	12	95,000	10	862,000	
4	Episode 4	23 July 2023	Sunday 7:30 pm	374,000	7	70,000	8	744,000	
5	Episode 5	24 July 2023	Monday 7:30 pm	451,000	13	74,000	11	853,000	
6	Episode 6	25 July 2023	Tuesday 7:30 pm	426,000	10	80,000	9	795,000	
7	Episode 7	30 July 2023	Sunday 7:30 pm	322,000	11	77,000	11	661,000	
8	Episode 8	31 July 2023	Monday 7:30 pm	362,000	16	60,000	16	702,000	
9	Episode 9	1 August 2023	Tuesday 7:30 pm	414,000	11	—N/a	—N/a	414,000	
10	Episode 10	6 August 2023	Sunday 7:30 pm	344,000	12	—N/a	—N/a	344,000	
11	Finale The Extraction	7 August 2023	Monday 7:30 pm	353,000 421,000	19 14			353,000 421,000	
