= De Bilt =

- Municipality
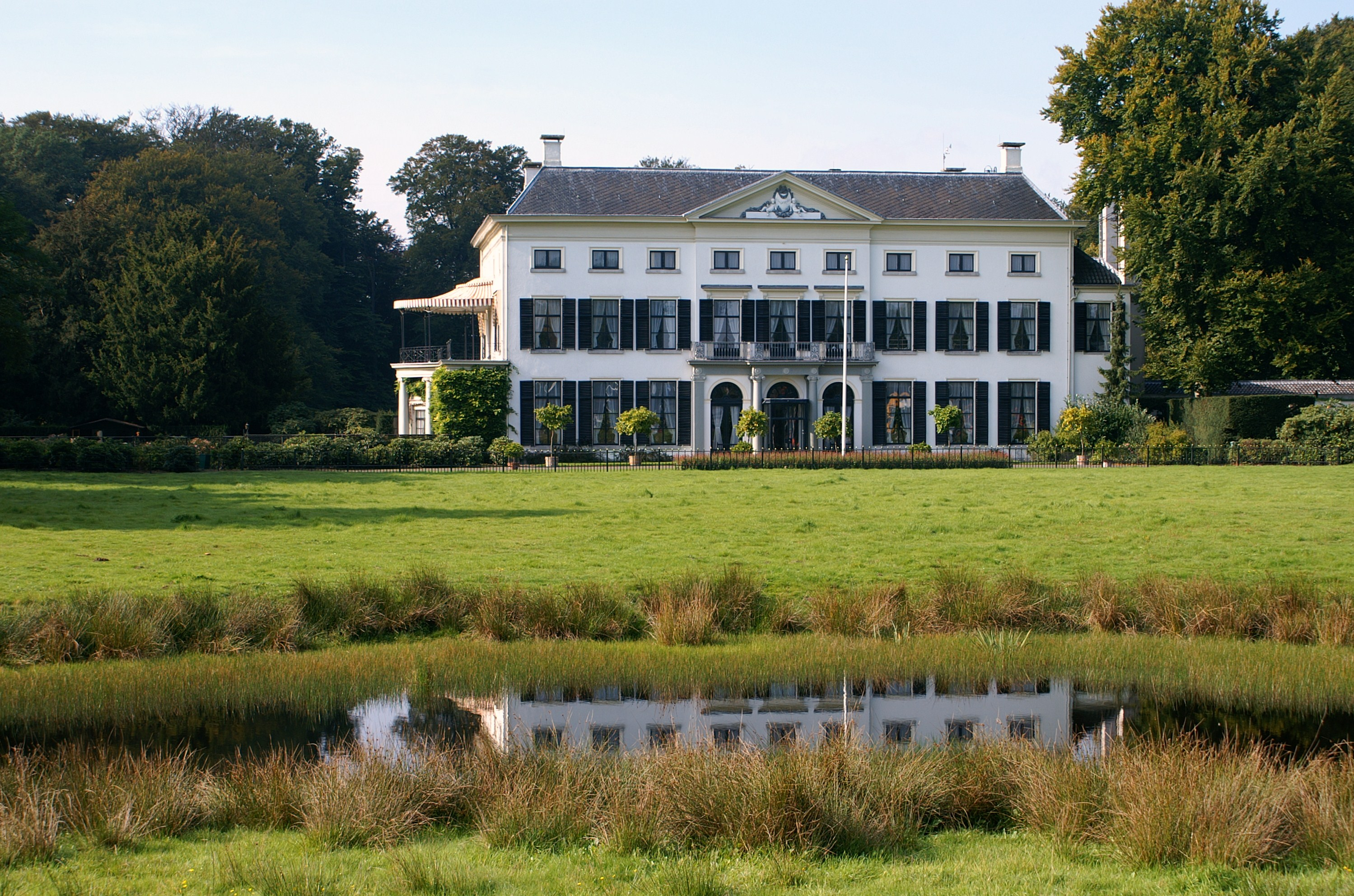
- Vollenhoven, De Bilt

- Flag Coat of arms

- Location in Utrecht
- Coordinates: 52°7′N 5°12′E
- Country: Netherlands
- Province: Utrecht

Government
  - Body: Municipal council
  - Mayor: Maarten Haverkamp (CDA)

Area
  - Total: 67.13 km^{2} (25.92 sq mi)
  - Land: 66.12 km^{2} (25.53 sq mi)
  - Water: 1.01 km^{2} (0.39 sq mi)
- Elevation: 4 m (13 ft)

Population (January 2021)
  - Total: 43,384
  - Density: 656/km^{2} (1,700/sq mi)
- Demonym: Biltenaar(s)
- Time zone: UTC+1 (CET)
  - Summer (DST): UTC+2 (CEST)
- Postcode: 3615, 3720–3732, 3737–3739
- Area code: 030, 0346
- Website: www.debilt.nl

De Bilt (Dutch pronunciation: [də ˈbɪlt]) is a municipality and town in the province of Utrecht, Netherlands. It had a population of 43,384 in 2021. De Bilt houses the headquarters of the Royal Netherlands Meteorological Institute (KNMI).

It is the ancestral home and namesake of the prominent Vanderbilt family of the United States.

== Population centres ==
The municipality of De Bilt consists of the following cities, towns, villages and/or districts: Bilthoven, De Bilt, Groenekan, Hollandsche Rading, Maartensdijk, and Westbroek.

== Topography ==
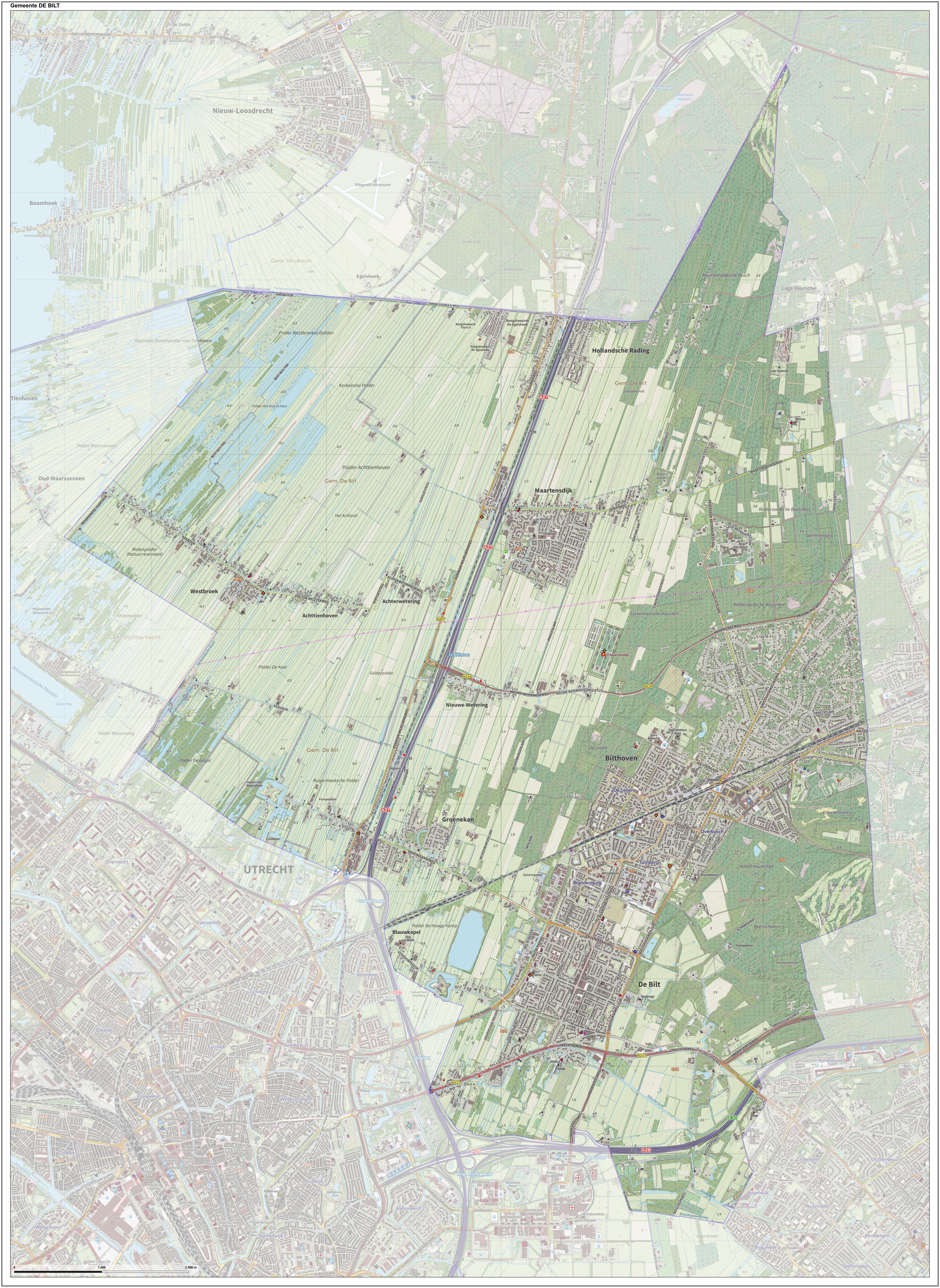

Map of the municipality of De Bilt, June 2015

== Notable people ==
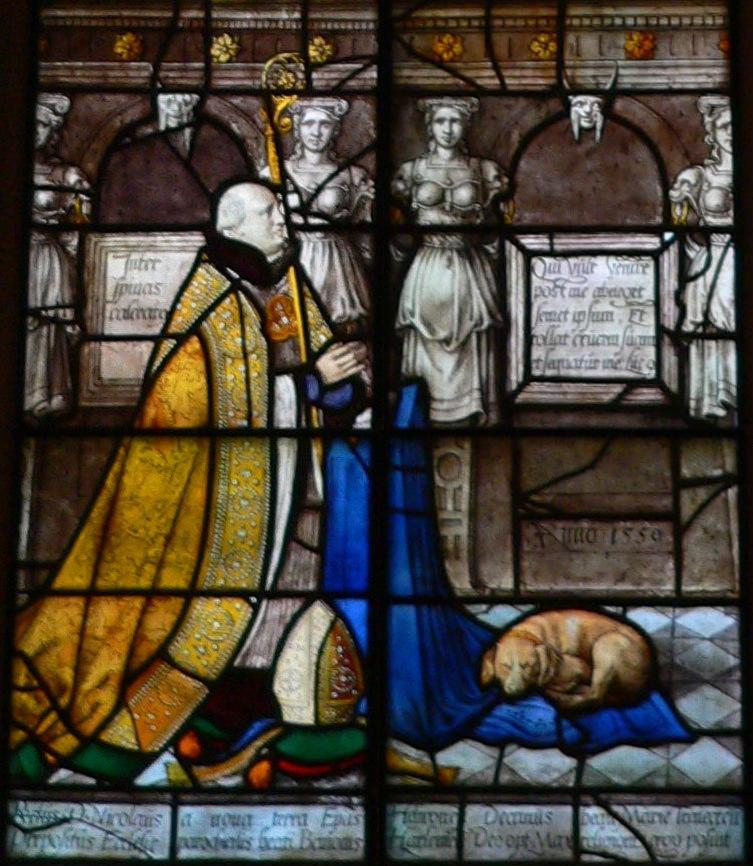
Nicolaas van Nieulandt, 1559

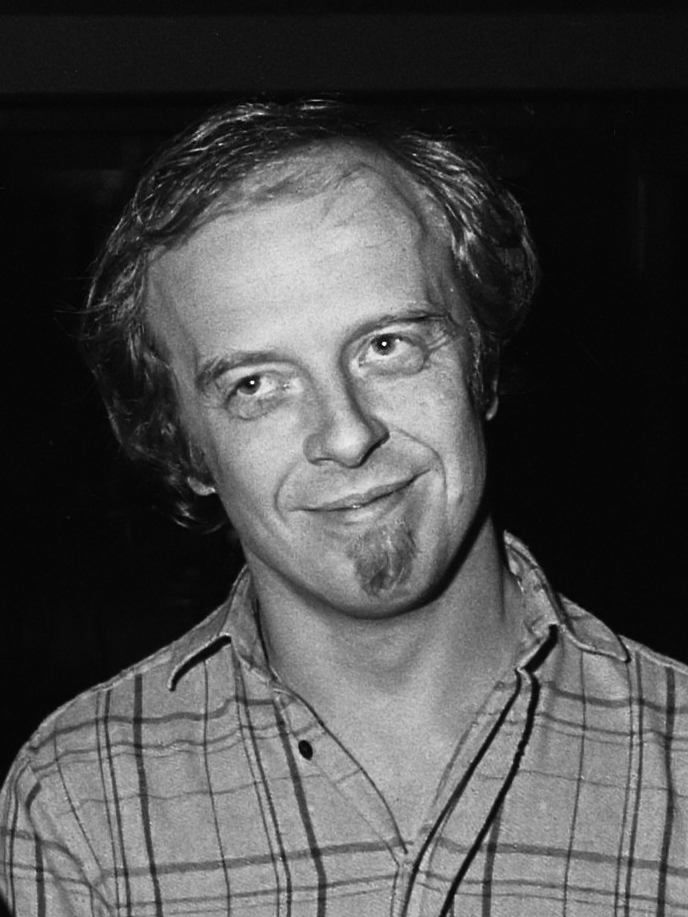
Erik van der Wurff, 1979

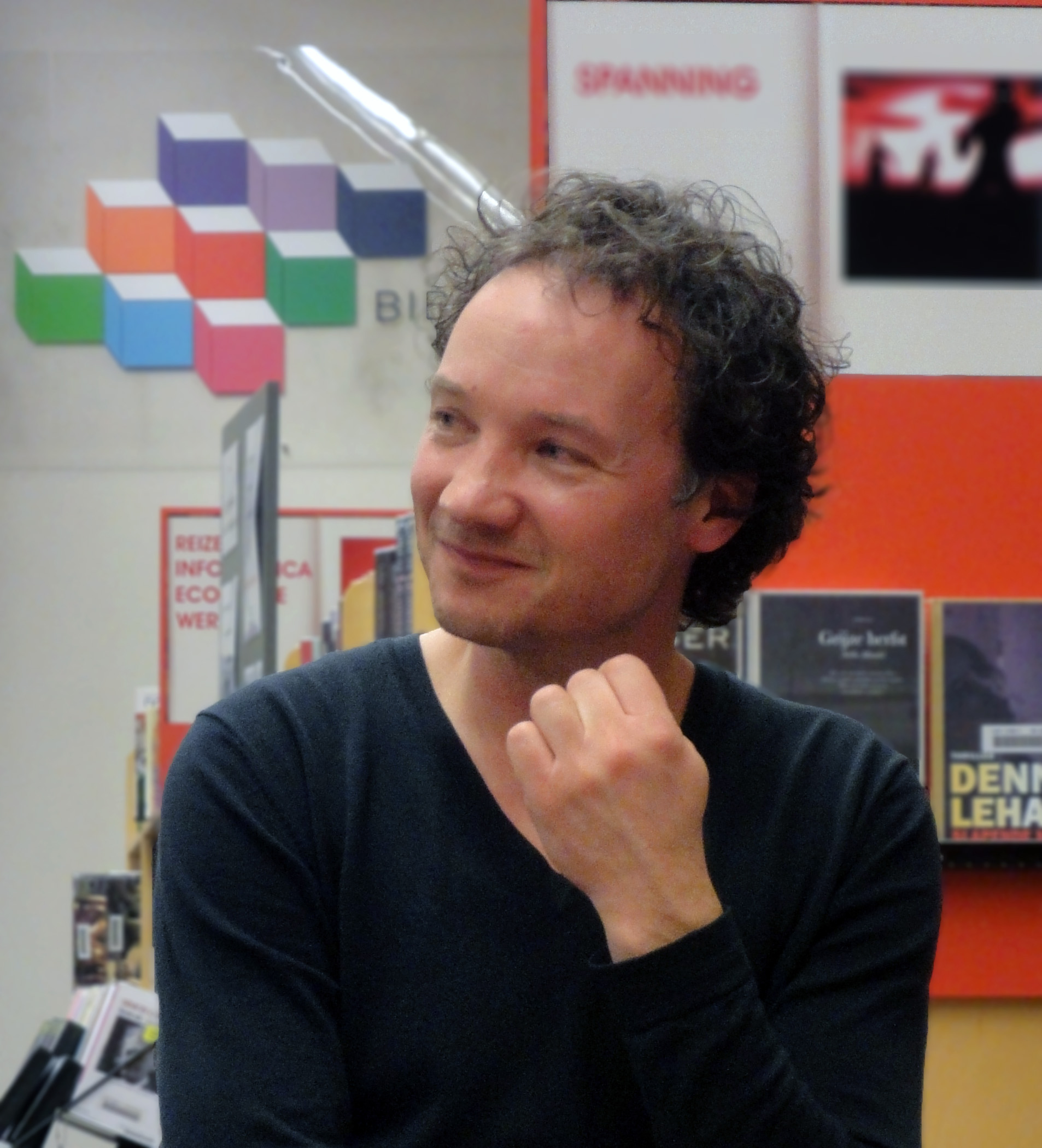
Bas Haring, 2013

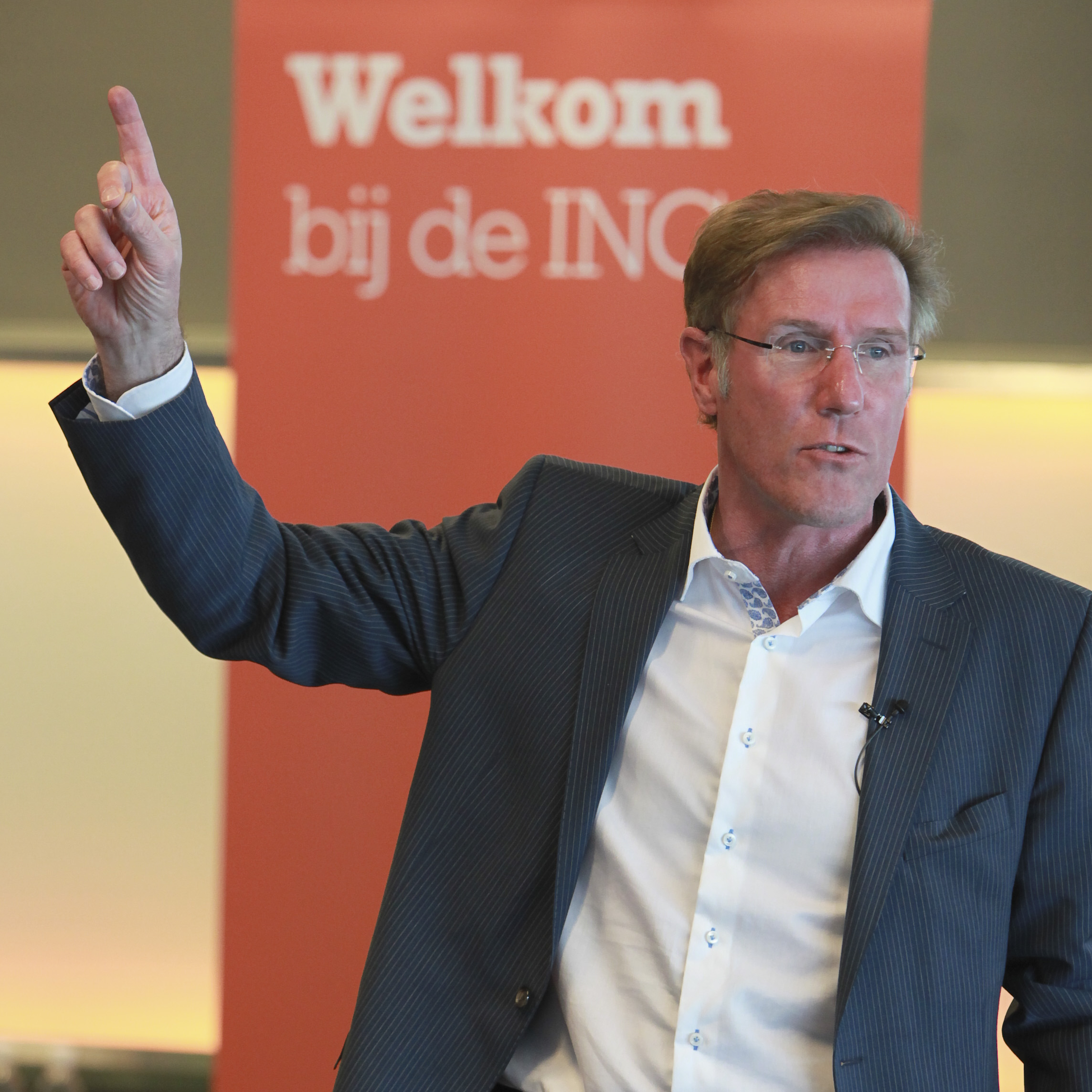
Hans van Breukelen, 2011

- Nicolaas van Nieuwland (1510 in Maartensdijk – 1580) Bishop of Haarlem and abbot of Egmond Abbey 1562 to 1569.
- Joan Gideon Loten (1710 in Groenekan – 1789) worked in the Dutch East India Company, the 29th Governor of Zeylan
- The Vanderbilt family, prominent in the USA during the Gilded Age, takes its name from the town, meaning 'from De Bilt'.
- Johan Beyen (1897 in Bilthoven – 1976) a politician, helped create the European Economic Community
- Auke Bloembergen (1927 in De Bilt – 2016) a jurist, justice at the Supreme Court of the Netherlands 1979 to 1993
- Els Borst (1932 – 2014 in Bilthoven) a politician, academic and physician
- Ad Donker (1933 in Bilthoven – 2002) a pioneering publisher of social critical works in South Africa
- Anne Sjerp Troelstra (1939 in Maartensdijk – 2019) a maths professor the Institute for Logic, Language and Computation at the University of Amsterdam.
- Madelon Hooykaas (born 1942 in Maartensdijk) a video artist, photographer and film maker
- Madelon Vriesendorp (born 1945 in Bilthoven) an artist, co-founded of the Office of Metropolitan Architecture
- Erik van der Wurff (1945 in De Bilt – 2014) a pianist, composer, arranger, producer and conductor
- Frederik de Groot (born 1946 in Bilthoven) an actor and TV spokesman for ING Direct Canada
- Thomas von der Dunk (born 1961) a cultural historian, writer and columnist; raised in Bilthoven
- Albert Schram (born 1964 in De Bilt) the Vice Chancellor of the Papua New Guinea University of Technology
- Bas Haring (born 1968 in De Bilt) a writer of popular science and children's literature and TV presenter
- Jetske van den Elsen (born 1972 in De Bilt) a television presenter

=== Sport ===
- John Blankenstein (1949 in De Bilt – 2006) a football referee and gay rights activist
- Ingrid van der Elst (born 1955 in Bilthoven) a former sportswoman in cricket and field hockey
- Hans van Breukelen (born 1956) a former football goalkeeper with 511 club caps, grew up in De Bilt
- Martijntje Quik (born 1973 in De Bilt) a former coxswain, silver medallist at the 2000 Summer Olympics
- Joost Broerse (born 1979 in De Bilt) a former footballer with 448 club caps
- Lisa Westerhof (born 1981 in De Bilt) a sailor, competed at the 2004 and 2012 Summer Olympics
- Thierry Brinkman (born 1995 in Bilthoven) a field hockey player

== Gallery ==
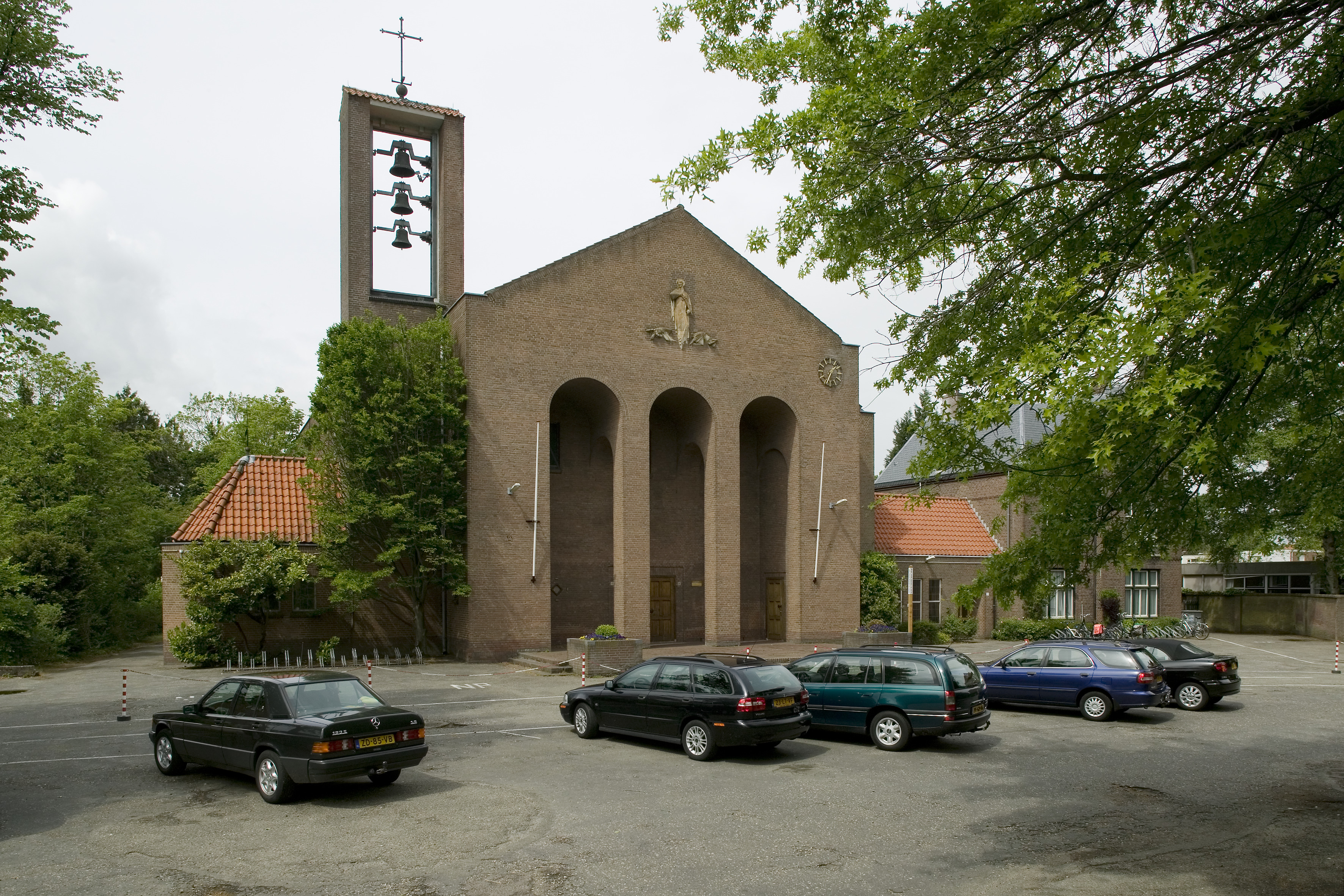
Roman Catholic Church of Saint Michael - De Bilt

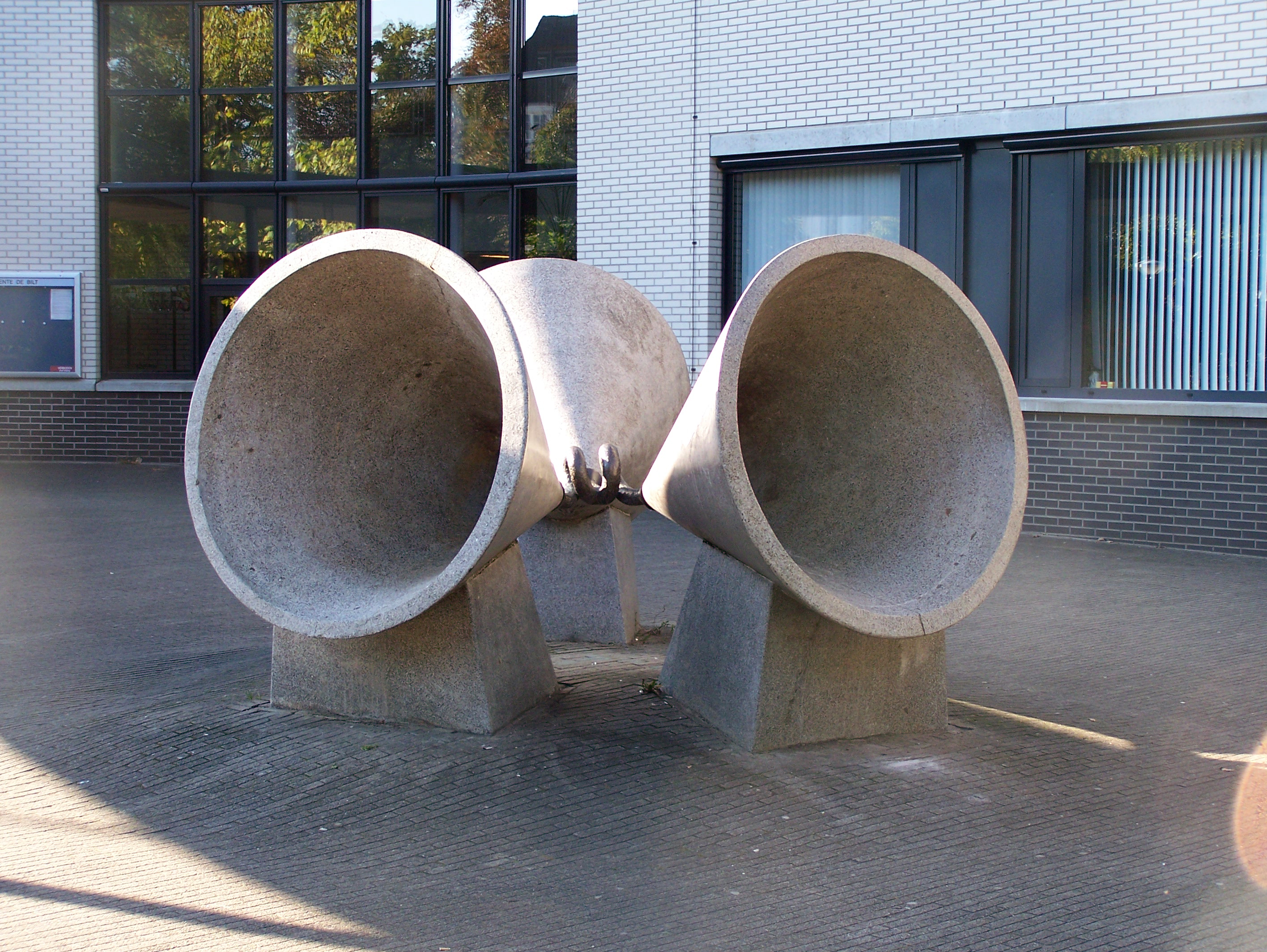
Granito Kegels by Carel Lanters, Soestdijkseweg, Bilthoven

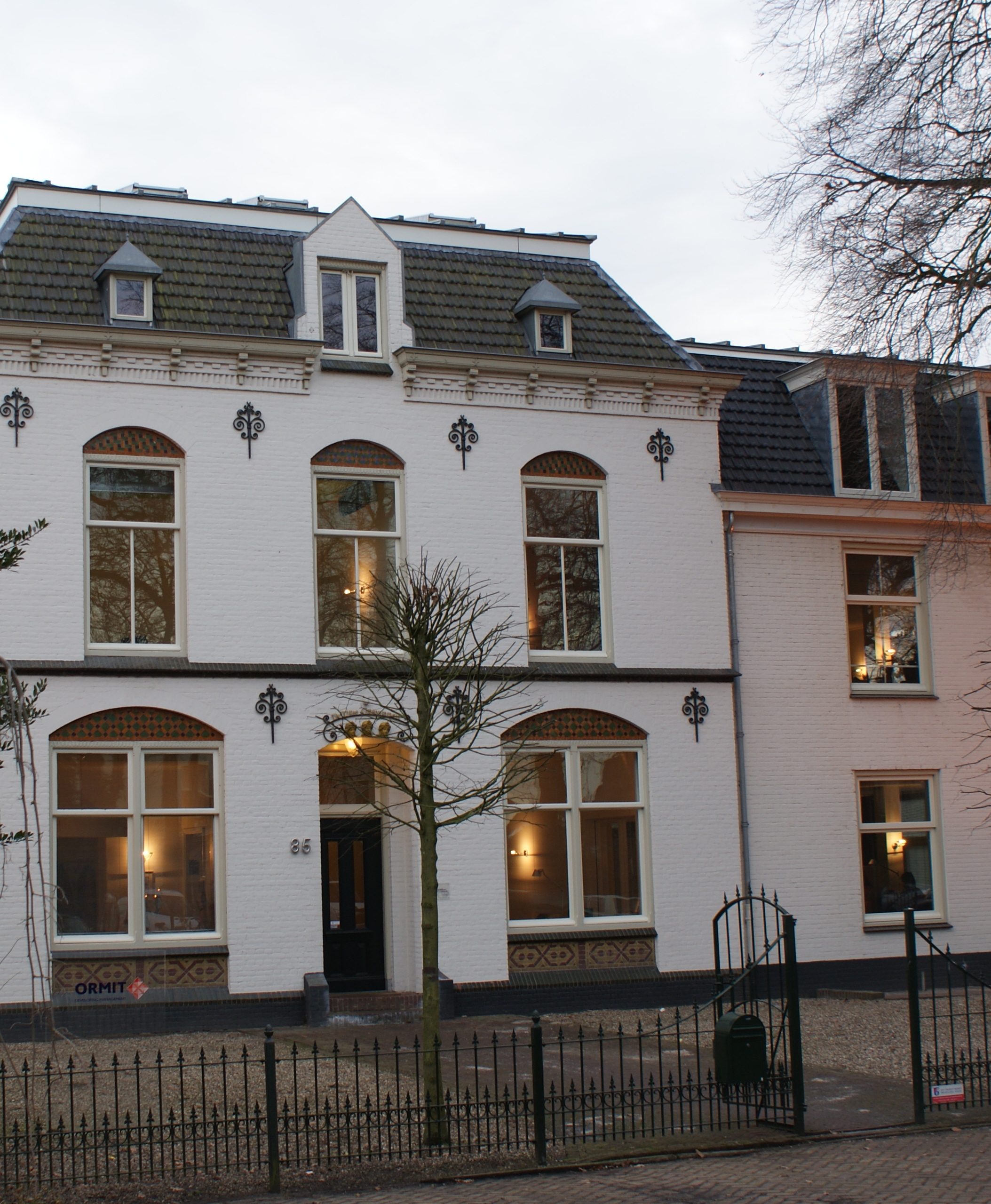
Office

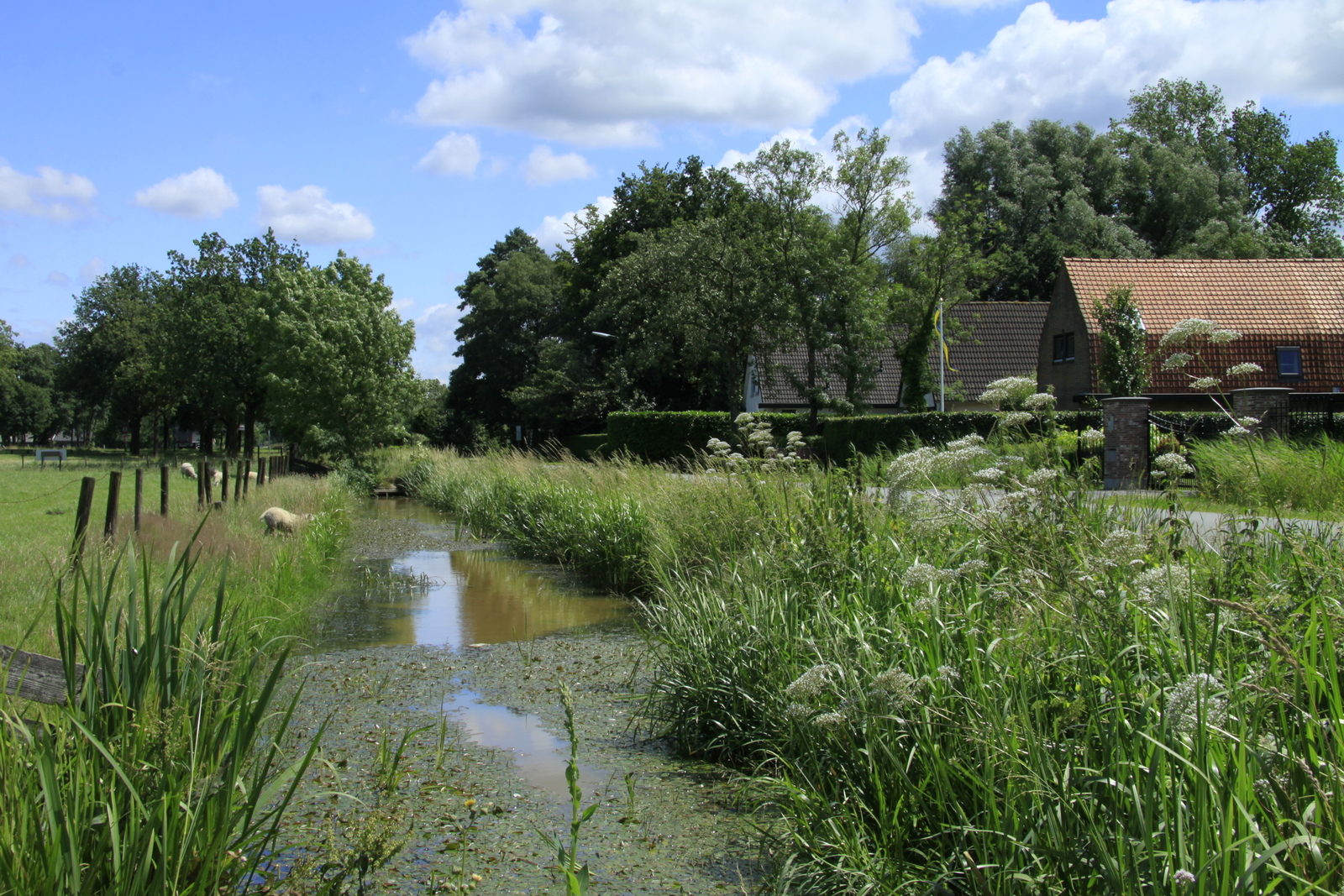
Neighborhood Nieuwe Wetering
