= Bas Haring =

Dutch philosopher

Sebastiaan Haring
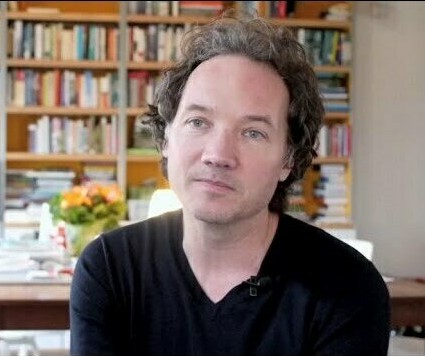
- Bas Haring
- Born: 23 April 1968 (age 57)

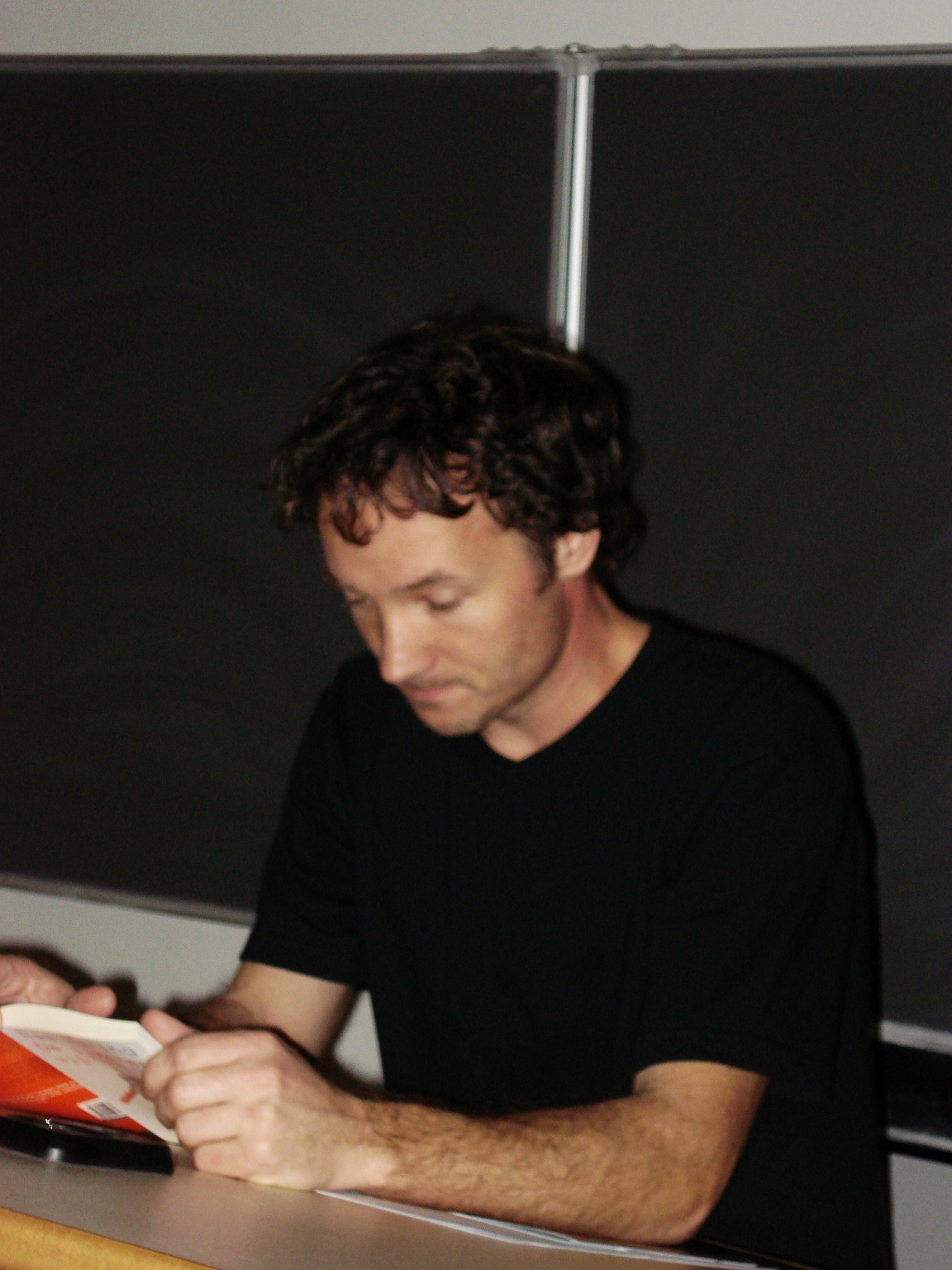
Bas Haring reading from De IJzeren Wil (The Iron Will), 2007

Sebastiaan (Bas) Haring (born 23 April 1968 in De Bilt) is a Dutch writer of popular science and children's literature, television presenter and professor. He is a full professor at Leiden University, where he has held a chair in "public understanding of science" since 2007. He also hosted his own philosophical TV program for Dutch public broadcasting.

Haring first achieved prominence with his 2001 children's book Cheese and the Theory of Evolution in which he explained evolution and its implications. The book received several awards and has been translated into ten different languages. His book For a Successful Life was published in 2008 by Beautiful Books Limited (UK).

== Publications (in English) ==
- Bas Haring: Why biodiversity loss is not a disaster. Leiden, 2020. ISBN 978-94-006-0390-5
- Bas Haring: For a Successful Life. Beautiful Books Limited, 2008. ISBN 978-1905636310
- Bas Haring: Adaptive image segmentation. Dissertation, Utrecht University, 1997. ISBN 90-393-1070-X
