= Albert Schram =

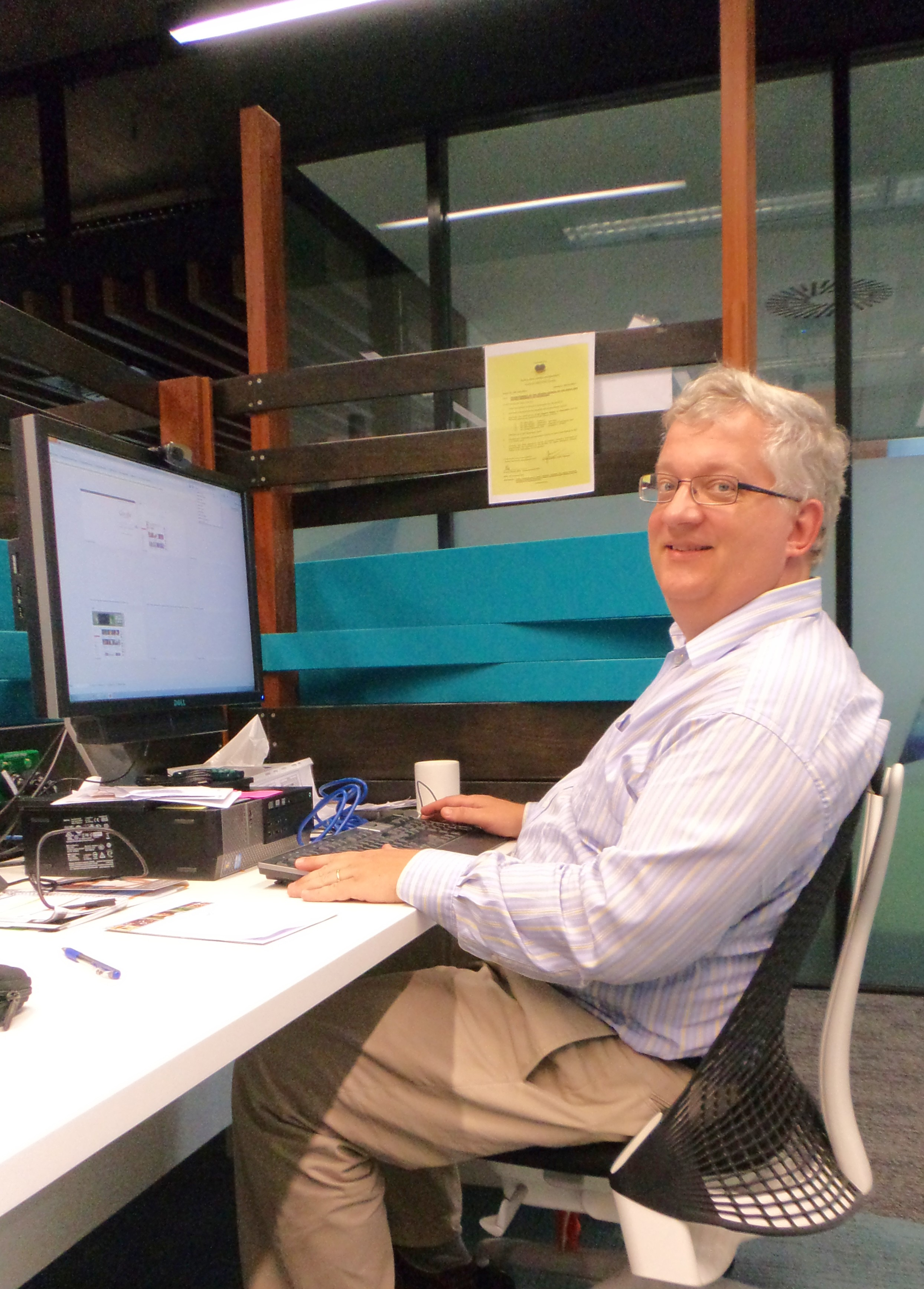
- Schram in 2013
- Born: 2 September 1964; De Bilt, Netherlands
- Education: European University Institute, Fiesole, Italy
- Occupation: University President
- Employer: Papua New Guinea University of Technology

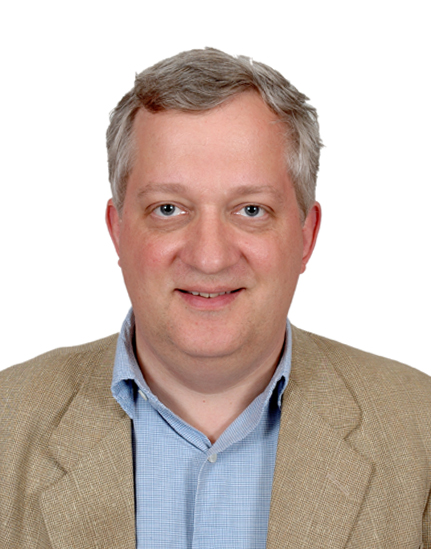
Albert Schram in 2005

Albert Ernst Giovanni Schram (born 2 September 1964, in De Bilt, the Netherlands) is the Vice Chancellor of the Papua New Guinea University of Technology (UNITECH). He took over on 7 February 2012 from Misty Baloiloi, who had been Vice-Chancellor for 17 years. He is also adjunct professor at James Cook University's Cairns Institute (Australia) and at the University of Turabo Business School (Puerto Rico).

== Biography ==
Schram completed the Gymnasium B program at Het Nieuwe Lyceum in Bilthoven, and did his master's degree in European history at the University of Utrecht.

In 1994, he obtained his doctorate degree in the field of Economic History from the European University Institute in Fiesole (Italy). Since then he has taken up residence in Costa Rica, Nicaragua, Guatemala, Belgium, the Netherlands, Turks and Caicos Islands, Italy, and Papua New Guinea. He is married and has no children.

== Academic leadership ==
From 1994 to 2003 Schram worked in San José, Costa Rica at the Latin American University of Science and Technology ULACIT where he attained the professor's rank in 1999, and supervised 5 PhD theses. From 1999 to 2003, he coordinated an environmental economics program for Central America at the University of Costa Rica, and also worked as advisor and environmental auditor for the Costa Rican Ministry of Environment and the Ecological Flag program for environmental management. For two and half years, he was research fellow at the University of Ghent's Center for Environmental Economics and Management. In 2005, he was Resident Lecturer and briefly acting director at the School for Field Studies "Center for Marine Resources Studies" on South Caicos (Turks and Caicos Islands).

In 2006, he became Academic Director at the Zuyd University's Maastricht Hotel Management School (the Netherlands). From 2007 to 2011, he was Research Funding Advisor at the Maastricht University's School of Business and Economics.

== Academic and policy work ==
Schram has published his PhD thesis with Cambridge University Press in 1997 with the title "Railways and the Formation of the Italian State in the Nineteenth Century". Afterwards he published on a wide variety of topics in management and social sciences: corporate social responsibility, environmental and experimental economics, economic valuation, climate change, green economy, time-use research, health care management and risk assessment.

In 2011, he carried out the policy review on corporate social responsibility for the Directorate General for Research and Innovation (European Commission). In 2011, he was team leader for the scoping study on the green economy for the European External Action Service for the Rio+20 UN summit.

His fundamental research interests are the role of multi-national companies and emerging large technological systems in social and economic development in the long run.
