= Jetske van den Elsen =

Dutch television presenter (born 1972)

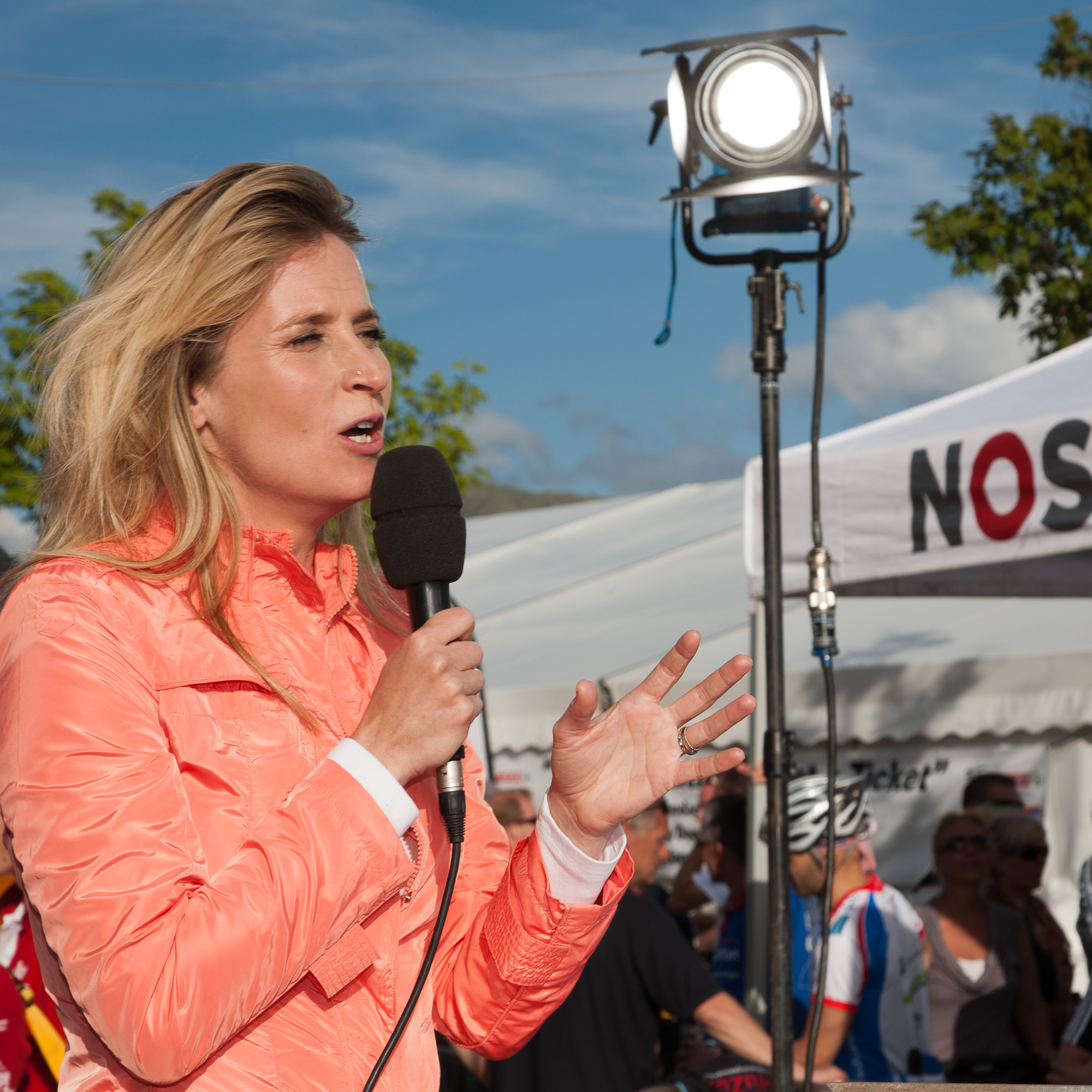
- Van den Elsen in 2012
- Born: September 1, 1972 (age 53)
- Occupation: Television presenter
- Known for: Dutch television

Jetske van den Elsen (born 1 September 1972 in De Bilt) is a Dutch female television presenter.

At the age of four, she moved to Nieuwegein and followed her education there. After that, she went to the HKU-theatre school in Utrecht. She has taught at the theatre school, and directed musicals on primary schools and she worked as a journalist for Stadsomroep Utrecht (municipal broadcasting organisation).

== Television ==
- Vakantie TV (SBS6)
- De draad kwijt (RTL 4)
- Het Klokhuis (NPS)
- Willem Wever (NCRV)
- BUYA (NCRV)
- Missie Kilimanjaro (NCRV)
- Zomersproeten (NCRV)
- De BZT-Show (NCRV)
- De Rijdende Rechter (NCRV)
- Bijna Beroemd (NCRV)
- Korte lontjes (NCRV)
- Spoorloos (KRO/NCRV)
