= Hunted (2015 TV series) =

British reality television series

- Also known as: Celebrity Hunted
- Genre: Reality
- Directed by: Miles Blayden-Ryall; Helen Crampton; Sam Eastall; Georgina Kiedrowski; Tim Lawton; Abi Mowbray
- Narrated by: Eddie Marsan (2015); Jonathan Smith (2016–)
- Theme music composer: Nick Harvey
- Country of origin: United Kingdom
- Original language: English
- No. of series: 8 (Civilian); 7 (Celebrity)
- No. of episodes: 48 (Civilian); 42 (Celebrity)

Production
- Executive producers: Tim Whitwell; Matt Bennett; Jonathan Smith
- Producer: Lucy Curtis
- Production location: United Kingdom
- Cinematography: Sean Lewis
- Editors: Diane Bernhardt; Eddie Haselden
- Camera setup: multi-camera
- Running time: 52 minutes
- Production company: Shine TV

Original release
- Network: Channel 4
- Release: 10 September 2015 – 3 November 2025
- Release: 10 October 2017 – 25 August 2026

Related
- Hunted USA; Hunted Australia

Hunted is a British reality television series that began airing on Channel 4 on 10 September 2015. The series features contestants who are instructed to go on the run for a period of 21 days (previously 28 days between series 1–2, 25 days from series 3–7, and 21 days in series 8) in mainland Great Britain, whilst avoiding a team of Hunters composed of former and serving police, intelligence personnel, and on-foot teams.

During their time, the Hunters have access to contestants' personal information and use "powers of the state" such as ANPR, CCTV and call tracing to locate contestants. At times, the Hunters will use social media and monetary rewards to members of the public (and captured contestants) for information leading to a successful capture. On the final day, any remaining contestants must reach a designated "extraction" point before being captured, winning a share of £100,000. It has a similar format to the programme Wanted which aired from 1996–1997 on Channel 4.

A celebrity adaptation, Celebrity Hunted, is also produced in aid of Stand Up to Cancer, where contestants compete for a shorter time period of 14 days.

In March 2025, Channel 4 confirmed that Hunted and Celebrity Hunted would return for their eighth and seventh series respectively. Filmed in Summer 2025, the eighth regular series aired from 12 October 2025 to 3 November 2025 with the seventh celebrity series airing from 3 August 2026 to 25 August 2026.

== Format and rules ==
In both the civilian and celebrity series, the contestants, now regarded as Fugitives, voluntarily go on the run in mainland Great Britain and must avoid detection from the Hunters, a group of current and former police and intelligence officials for 25 days (28 in the first two series and 14 for the celebrity series). From series two, the contestants are escorted to a public area and given a head start before the Hunters begin their search and are given the names of their targets. Fugitives are given a debit card with a small amount of money provided by the production team, and a rucksack containing essential and personal items (though in series five, the fugitives began with only the clothes on their back and no head start). During their time on the run the Fugitives can use any existing connections, or ask members of the general public, to assist them in avoiding capture.

Whilst the Fugitives attempt to avoid using technology and thus detection, the Hunters use a vast array of different "powers of the state", such as closed circuit surveillance, phone records and number plate recognition to pinpoint their chosen target. If one (or more) Fugitives have become difficult to locate, the Hunters use social media to encourage members of the public to reveal any information, and post content specifically for a Fugitive to reveal their location without realising. Hunters may also be directly contacted by the public with any leads by telephone. Any member of the public with information leading to capture is compensated for their effort. Hunters additionally operate throughout the country through use of two-person ground teams that can deploy immediately under order of the Chief. The ground teams also perform reconnaissance at Fugitives' homes and attempt to goad family members or loved ones for information and/or may be observed to determine any irregularities in their daily routines.

When a Fugitive is caught, they are told their time on the run is over and are escorted to a vehicle for debrief back at the Hunters’ headquarters.

In the final few days of the game, any Fugitives still on the run are given instructions for their 'extraction point' and a finite amount of time to get there. The Hunters are told of the last-known locations of the Fugitives and extend their efforts to figure out where the extraction is taking place. When a Fugitive successfully reaches the extraction point within the time-frame, they can no longer be caught by the Hunters and are deemed a Winner. Due to the nature of the show, there are two possible outcomes to the hunt: one or more Fugitives can reach the extraction point and win, or every Fugitive can be caught and the hunt prematurely ends (known as a "clean sweep").

== Regular series ==
Series	Start date	End date	Episodes
1	10 September 2015	15 October 2015	6
2	22 September 2016	27 October 2016	6
3	4 January 2018	8 February 2018	6
4	10 January 2019	14 February 2019	6
5	13 February 2020	19 March 2020	6
6	22 May 2022	6 June 2022	6
7	17 March 2024	21 April 2024	6
8	12 October 2025	3 November 2025	8

=== Series 1 (2015) ===
Fourteen contestants were chosen and began in their respective hometowns. Fairoaks Airport in Surrey served as the extraction point.

Name	Age	Occupation	Hometown	Status
Lauren English (Note: Lauren & Emily were a duo when the hunt began but opted to separate)	27	Decorator	Cobham	Winners
Emily Dredge	28	Entrepreneur	Putney	Winners
Stephen Hardiker (Note: Stephen & Martin were a duo when the hunt began)	36	Plumber	Walsall	Winners
Martin Cole	32	IT specialist	Walsall	Winners
Ricky Allen	56	General practitioner	South London	Caught
Adam Channell (Note: Adam & Emma were a duo when the hunt began)	30	PR manager	Southampton	Caught
Emma Channell	30	PR manager	Paris	Caught
Adam Young	25	NHS support worker	Bridgend	Caught
Davinder "Dovski" Singh (Note: Davinder & Harinder were a duo when the hunt began)	30	Team manager	Leicester	Caught
Harinder "Harry" Singh	28	Accountant	Leicester	Caught
Freddie Young (Note: Freddie & Jacqui were a duo when the hunt began)	21	Teaching assistant	Chingford	Caught
Jacqui Omer	44	Pub manager	Chingford	Caught
Elizabeth D'Arcy (Note: Elizabeth & Sandra were a duo when the hunt began)	56	Tutor	Folkestone	Caught
Sandra Cooley	42	Occupational therapist	Dublin	Caught

Notes

- Before he was caught, Ricky Allen proved so elusive while on the run in Scotland that one of the Hunters described it as "a real-life 39 steps" which was published in a newspaper as well as "wanted" posters.

=== Series 2 (2016) ===
Ten contestants were chosen and began in Milk Street in Birmingham. The Isle of Sheppey in Kent served as the extraction point. This was the first series where there was prize money for winners.

Name	Age	Occupation	Hometown	Status
Nick Cummings	50	Househusband	Taunton	Winners
Ayo Adesina (Note: Adesina and Alikor were a duo when the hunt began, but opted to separate)	33	Software developer	Hackney	Winners
Anna May (Note: May and Garnett were a duo when the hunt began)	25	Court clerk	Keighley	Caught
Elizabeth Garnett	20	Stockbroker temp	Leeds	Caught
Madu Alikor	33	Software developer/consultant	Hackney	Caught
Lolly Jones	34	Comedian/actress	London	Caught
Hamish Thorburn (Note: Thorburn and Skinner were a duo when the hunt began)	49	Property investor	Wirral	Caught
Mikaela Skinner	46	Building shop owner	Wirral	Caught
Kirk Bowett (Note: Bowett and Scarratt were a duo when the hunt began)	37	Facility manager	London	Caught
Jeremy "Jez" Scarratt	57	Army medic simulator	Cambridge	Caught

Notes

- Cummings had an accomplice impersonate him outside a leisure centre, leading the Hunters to believe they had caught him, when he was actually 120 mi (190 km) away on a canal path.
- After Alikor was caught, he was taken to Hunter HQ where Chief Peter Bleksley offered him £1,000 for information of the whereabouts of Adesina. Alikor declined the offer but admitted that he would have helped the Hunters if they had offered him £50,000.

=== Series 3 (2018) ===
Nine contestants were chosen and began in Manchester city centre. The River Dart in Devon served as the extraction point. From this series to the seventh in 2024, the number of days to avoid capture was reduced to 25.

Name	Age	Occupation	Hometown	Status
Daniel Murphy (Note: Murphy and Appleton were a duo when the hunt began)	33	Singer/milkman	Preston	Winners
Joseph Appleton	29	Singer/milkman	Preston	Winners
Bob Ayling (Note: Bob and Alex Ayling were a duo when the hunt began, but opted to separate)	60	Electrician	Dover	Winners
Alex Ayling	26	Postman	Dover	Winners
Magid Mah	28	Deputy mayor of Sheffield	Sheffield	Caught
Jamie Clark	37	Ex-policeman	Dorset	Caught
Mella Mwamba (Note: Mwamba and Canrom were a duo when the hunt began)	28	Housewife	Bromley	Caught
Sandra Canrom	30	Advertising executive	Middlesex	Caught
Carlene Crowe	67	Retired college tutor	Suffolk	Caught

Notes

- Crowe was caught on the first day of being on the run.
- Father and son fugitives Bob and Alex Ayling began as a duo, but at Bob's encouragement about mid-way through their time on the run, they agreed to separate and reunite on the day of extraction. Alex is autistic and was bullied at school, but wanted to prove himself.
- Murphy and Appleton evaded the Hunters by cycling from place to place as their mode of transport.
- After the Fugitives learned the location of the extraction point, Alex Ayling was seen by the Hunters on CCTV appearing to drop something into a drain. The Hunters spent a considerable amount of time searching the drain for the item, which turned out only to be a receipt.

=== Series 4 (2019) ===
Ten contestants were chosen and began at the Port of Liverpool. The roof of the Edgbaston Car Park, near the Bullring Shopping Centre in Birmingham served as the extraction point. This was the first time in any series that the Hunters won.

Name	Age	Occupation	Home county	Status
Frank Savage (Note: Frank & Harry were a duo when the hunt began)	23	Campsite owner	East Sussex	Caught
Nathanael Watt (Note: Watt and Haruna were a duo when the hunt began, but opted to separate)	26	Architecture student	Nottingham	Caught
Harry Savage	20	Student	Sussex	Caught
Ismail Haruna	27	Architectural technologist	Nottingham	Caught
Loren Hannon	26	Personal banker	Essex	Caught
Matthew "Matt" Mason	29	Royal Marines Commando	Devon	Caught
Emma Davidson (Note: Davidson and Kirkham were a duo when the hunt began)	23	Neo-natal intensive care nurse	Devon	Caught
Jess Kirkham	27	Neo-natal intensive care nurse	Devon	Caught
Paul James (Note: James and Batchelor were a duo when the hunt began)	48	Construction manager	Hertfordshire	Caught
Nick Batchelor	51	Lead youth worker	Kent	Caught

Notes

- Ismail Haruna was caught after learning the location of the extraction point. At Hunter HQ, Chief Peter Bleksley offered him £4,000 for the extraction point's location. The Hunters also obtained audio footage from Nathanael Watt's social media accounts in an attempt to make Haruna believe Watt had just been captured. Ultimately, Haruna decided not to help the Hunters, although the Hunters were still able to gain information about the extraction point from his diary.
- Both Nathanael Watt and Frank Savage made it close to the extraction point before being captured. Watt was captured just inside the entrance of the car park, while Savage made it all the way to the roof before finally being caught.

=== Series 5 (2020) ===
Ten contestants were chosen and began at A Bond Warehouse on Spike Island, Bristol. For this series, the Fugitives started with no supplies or prior knowledge of their starting point. Amlwch Port in Anglesey served as the extraction point.

Name	Age	Occupation	Hometown	Status
Dan Ryder (Note: Ryder and Morrison were a duo when the hunt began)	33	Gym owner	Wigan	Winners
Hayley Morrison	27	Human resources	Wigan	Winners
Rob Ellington (Note: Ellington and Arrowsmith were a duo when the hunt began)	24	Social media content creator	Wokingham	Winners
Ben Arrowsmith	24	Pensions	Reading	Winners
Ella Tomkins (Note: Tomkins and Warr were a duo when the hunt began)	22	Charity researcher	Newbury	Caught
Jess Warr	23	Independent financial advisor	Swindon	Caught
Daniel Edwards (Note: Greenidge and Pugh-Thomas were a duo when the hunt began but opted to separate)	32	Landscape gardener	Birmingham	Caught
Frankie Greenidge	35	Foster Carer	Birmingham	Caught
Toni Pugh-Thomas	48	Haute-Couturier	Fulham	Caught
Mervyn "Titch" Little	78	Retired British Army major	Portsmouth	Caught

=== Series 6 (2022) ===
Eleven contestants were chosen and began on the Isle of Wight. For this series, the fugitives started with only a change of clothes and a small amount of money. The island of Inchmurrin in Loch Lomond served as the extraction point.

Name	Age	Occupation	Hometown	Status
Nathan Falcon (Note: Sorohan and Falcon were a duo when the hunt began, but split after James was caught due to foot injury.)	28	Graphic designer	Castleford	Winners
Sarah Kibble	35	Police officer	Norfolk	Winners
James Sorohan	32	Postman	Castleford	Caught
Grace Elliot (Note: Grace and Abi Elliot were a duo when the hunt began)	24	Drama teacher	Hampshire	Caught
Abi Elliot	21	Occupational therapist	Southampton	Caught
Amarinder Sehda (Note: Amarinder and Shoba Sehda were a duo when the hunt began)	34	Dentist	Essex	Caught
Shoba Sehda	59	Admin officer	Essex	Caught
Liam Torpey (Note: Torpey and Taylor were a duo when the hunt began)	36	Plumber	Sheffield	Caught
Katie Taylor	34	Art tutor	Sheffield	Caught
Meurig Boggust (Note: Meurig & Elinor were a duo when the hunt began)	30	Mental health nurse	Swansea	Caught
Elinor Pope	22	Waitress	Swansea	Caught

=== Series 7 (2024) ===
A seventh series was broadcast in 2024, Twelve fugitives were chosen and began in central London. Stickle Tarn in the Lake District was the location of the extraction point. The series was filmed in June 2022 and was the last that fugitives had to avoid capture for 25 days.

Name	Age	Occupation	Hometown	Status
Jaxon Feeley (Note: Jaxon and Nicola Feeley were a duo when the hunt began.)	29	Prison officer	Wigan	Winners
Nicola Feeley	27	Prison officer	Wigan	Winners
Sade Cooke (Note: Cooke and Nightingale were a duo when the hunt began.)	36	Property business owner	Nottingham	Winners
Cameron Nightingale	19	Sales assistant	Nottingham	Caught
Alex Speke (Note: Speke and Barham were a duo when the hunt began.)	27	Financial consultant	London	Caught
Cathy Vandepeer (Note: Vandepeer and Boiling-Mercer were a duo when the hunt began.)	56	Aesthetic technician	Worthing	Caught
Annida Boiling-Mercer	55	Care home entertainer	Lancing	Caught
Jack Barham	27	Product developer	London	Caught
Beth Murphy (Note: Beth and Steve Murphy were a duo when the hunt began.)	23	Quantity surveyor	Manchester	Caught
Steve Murphy	60	Construction business owner	Essex	Caught
Munya Makuve (Note: Munya and Christine Makuve were a duo when the hunt began.)	47	Former army major	Sheffield	Caught
Christine Makuve	48	Teacher	Sheffield	Caught

=== Series 8 (2025) ===
Filmed in Summer 2025, the eighth series was broadcast from October 2025. Fourteen fugitives were chosen and began at Stansted Airport. Eurotunnel Folkestone Terminal served as the extraction point. From this series onwards, the number of days to avoid capture was reduced to 21.

Name	Age	Occupation	Hometown	Status
Shaq Brown (Note: Brown and Hanson-George were a duo when the hunt began)	31	Builder	Brixton	Winner
Marie Bailey (Note: Marie and Sean Bailey were a duo when the hunt began)	43	Team leader	Bristol	Caught
Andrew Frampton (Note: Frampton and Goodfellow were a duo when the hunt began.)	51	Farmer	West Dorset	Caught
Sean Bailey	47	Sweep driver	Bristol	Caught
Robin Goodfellow	37	Agricultural electrician	West Dorset	Caught
Chris Judge (Note: Judge and Johnson were a duo when the hunt began.)	46	Charity worker	Warrington	Caught
Ste Johnson	47	Project manager	Warrington	Caught
Dionne Martin (Note: Martin and Lewis were a duo when the hunt began.)	55	Payroll & compliance manager	Southend-on-Sea	Caught
Saffron Lewis	25	Solicitor	Southend-on-Sea	Caught
Emma Brock (Note: Brock and Salisbury were a duo when the hunt began.)	38	Business owner	Wakefield	Caught
Jenni Salisbury	34	Prison officer	Wakefield	Caught
Cameron Westwood (Note: Westwood and Moore were a duo when the hunt began.)	27	Decorator	Wolverhampton	Caught
Simran Moore	28	Social media manager	Wolverhampton	Caught
Warren Hanson-George	35	Builder	Brixton	Caught

== Hunters ==
A team of 30 specialists includes former and serving police and intelligence personnel, an ex CIA agent and cyber intelligence experts, who use the Fugitives' online footprints to research and hunt them. The team has access to simulated powers of the state, including CCTV and ANPR. Before starting, all the Fugitives gave permission to be tracked in the same way as the state might track a fugitive – their cash cards and phones are monitored, their houses searched and their friends and family questioned. The Hunters also use media campaigns to recruit the general public into helping them, offering financial incentives. The team is split into two parts: (i) a team of operatives in the field who are in vehicles across the UK, on standby to follow orders from Hunted HQ to head to a particular location to follow up leads on Fugitives' whereabouts or to question their friends and family; and (ii) a team in the Hunted HQ to gather Intelligence, which they then distribute to field teams.

=== List of chiefs ===
List of Hunted chiefs
Name	Active	Position	Notes	Win/Loss Record (Note: As Chief)
Brett Lovegrove	2015	Chief	The former head of Counter Terrorism Command for the City of London Police. Lovegrove departed after the first civilian season.	0–1
Peter "Bleks" Bleksley	2015–2019	Deputy chief (2015)	A former undercover detective at Scotland Yard. Bleksley served as the deputy chief to Lovegrove before assuming command in the second civilian season. After his first clean sweep in the fourth civilian season, Bleksley departed the show.	1–4
Peter "Bleks" Bleksley	2015–2019	Chief (2016–2019)	A former undercover detective at Scotland Yard. Bleksley served as the deputy chief to Lovegrove before assuming command in the second civilian season. After his first clean sweep in the fourth civilian season, Bleksley departed the show.	1–4
Ben "Sherlock" Owen	2015–2020	Deputy chief (2015–2019)	An ex-military sniper and member of British Military Intelligence. Owen loaned his services as a senior analyst on the American adaptation of the show in 2017, and as the deputy chief to Lovegrove and Bleksley before taking command in the third celebrity season and departing in the fifth civilian season. He also appeared in the 2022 Australian version.	0–2
Ben "Sherlock" Owen	2015–2020	Chief (2019–2020)	An ex-military sniper and member of British Military Intelligence. Owen loaned his services as a senior analyst on the American adaptation of the show in 2017, and as the deputy chief to Lovegrove and Bleksley before taking command in the third celebrity season and departing in the fifth civilian season. He also appeared in the 2022 Australian version.	0–2
Lisa Theaker	2022–2024	Chief	Serving assistant chief constable of Cleveland Police. Theaker succeeded Owen as chief for the fourth celebrity edition and sixth civilian season. After her first clean sweep in the fifth celebrity season and losing to the seventh season, Theaker departed the show.	1–3
Ray Howard	2025–present	Chief	Former detective chief superintendent. Ex head of intelligence, Thames Valley Police, lead on organised crime and specialist operations - covert policing. He succeeded Lisa Theaker as chief from the sixth celebrity season onwards.	0–3

== Celebrity Hunted ==
Series	Start date	End date	Episodes
1	10 October 2017	31 October 2017	4
2	16 October 2018	13 November 2018	5
3	13 October 2019	10 November 2019	5
4	30 January 2022	6 March 2022	6
5	14 March 2023	2 May 2023	6
6	5 January 2025	23 February 2025	8
7	3 August 2026	25 August 2026	8

=== Series 1 (2017) ===
Seven celebrities were chosen and began at Somerset House in London. Orford Ness served as the extraction point.

Name	Known for	Hometown	Status
Jay McGuiness (Note: McGuinness and Kaneswaran were a duo when the hunt began)	The Wanted singers	Nottinghamshire	Winners
Siva Kaneswaran	The Wanted singers	Dublin	Winners
Jamie Laing (Note: Laing and Matthews were a duo when the hunt began)	Made in Chelsea stars	Oxford	Caught
Spencer Matthews	Made in Chelsea stars	London	Caught
Anneka Rice	Television & radio presenter	Glamorganshire	Caught
Dominic Parker (Note: Dominic and Stephanie Parker were a duo when the hunt began)	Gogglebox stars	Kent	Caught
Stephanie Parker	Gogglebox stars	Kent	Caught

=== Series 2 (2018) ===
Eight celebrities were chosen and began at the Tower of London. Fawley Power Station served as the extraction point.

Name	Known for	Hometown	Status
Johnny Mercer (Note: Mercer and Burley were a duo when the hunt began but opted to separate)	Conservative Party politician	Kent	Winners
AJ Pritchard (Note: Pritchard and Smith were a duo when the hunt began but opted to separate)	Strictly Come Dancing professional	Stoke-on-Trent	Winners
Kem Cetinay (Note: Hughes and Cetinay were a duo when the hunt began)	Love Island contestants	Essex	Caught
Chris Hughes	Love Island contestants	Cheltenham	Caught
Kay Burley	Sky News broadcaster	Wigan	Caught
Louis Smith	Olympic artistic gymnast	Peterborough	Caught
Vicky Pattison (Note: Pattison and Joly were a duo when the hunt began but opted to separate)	Former Geordie Shore star	Newcastle-upon-Tyne	Caught
Dom Joly	Comedian	London	Caught

=== Series 3 (2019) ===
Eight celebrities were chosen and began at Ham Polo Club in Richmond. In this series, the celebrities started with tracking devices attached to their ankles. Herstmonceux Castle served as the extraction point.

Name	Known for	Hometown	Status
Aldo Zilli (Note: Zilli and Novelli were a duo when the hunt began)	Chef	Abruzzo	Winners
Jean-Christophe Novelli	Chef	Arras	Winners
Gavin Henson (Note: Henson and Offiah were a duo when the hunt began)	Former Wales rugby player	Mid Glamorgan	Winners
Martin Offiah	Former England rugby player	London	Caught
Georgia "Toff" Toffolo (Note: Toffolo and Johnson were a duo when the hunt began)	Former Made in Chelsea star	Torquay	Caught
Stanley Johnson	Politician & author	Penzance	Caught
Lucy Mecklenburgh (Note: Mecklenburgh and Bright were a duo when the hunt began)	Former The Only Way Is Essex stars	Havering	Caught
Lydia Bright	Former The Only Way Is Essex stars	Southwark	Caught

=== Series 4 (2022) ===
Eight celebrities were chosen and began at the London Eye. The Extraction Point for this series was Formby Beach.

Name	Known for	Hometown	Status
Iwan Thomas (Note: Thomas and Whitehead were a duo when the hunt began)	Olympic sprinter & sports pundit	Southampton	Winner
The Vivienne (Note: Veitch and The Vivienne were a duo when the hunt began)	Drag queen & RuPaul's Drag Race UK winner	Liverpool	Caught
Chloe Veitch	Television personality	Essex	Caught
Richard Whitehead	Paralympic marathon runner	Nottingham	Caught
Lisa Maffia (Note: Akudolu and Maffia were a duo when the hunt began)	So Solid Crew singer	Margate	Caught
Chizzy Akudolu	Former Holby City actress	London	Caught
Ollie Locke (Note: Ollie and Gareth Locke were a duo when the hunt began)	Made in Chelsea stars	London	Caught
Gareth Locke	Made in Chelsea stars	London	Caught

=== Series 5 (2023) ===
Ten celebrities began at Shrewsbury Prison, with Nikesh Patel joining later due to testing positive for COVID-19. As in Season 4 of the Civilian Version, none of the competitors made it to safety, with Bobby Seagull being captured at the Extraction Point at Headcorn Aerodrome.

Name	Known for	Hometown	Status
Bobby Seagull (Note: Seagull & Barker were a duo when the hunt began)	Mathematician & broadcaster	London	Caught
Nik Speakman (Note: The Speakmans were a duo when the hunt began)	This Morning therapists	Greater Manchester	Caught
Eva Speakman	This Morning therapists	Greater Manchester	Caught
Saffron Barker	YouTube personality	Brighton	Caught
Aimee Fuller (Note: Jones & Fuller were a duo when the hunt began)	Olympic snowboarder	London	Caught
Katya Jones	Strictly Come Dancing professional	Leningrad (now Saint Petersburg)	Caught
Ed Gamble (Note: Gamble & Acaster were a duo when the hunt began)	Comedians	London	Caught
James Acaster	Comedians	Kettering	Caught
Nikesh Patel (Note: Thorp & Patel were not a duo when the hunt began due to Patel having Coronavirus)	Actor	London	Caught
Nicola Thorp	Former Coronation Street actress	Blackpool	Caught

=== Series 6 (2025) ===
This series aired from 5 January 2025. The series was filmed in 2023 and was expected to air in early 2024 but broadcast was delayed (possibly due to external circumstances related to the firing of competitor Giovanni Pernice from Strictly Come Dancing). The celebrities below competed in the sixth series. They were released on the Mid-Norfolk Railway between Dereham and Wymondham shortly after Yaxham station and the extraction point was Burgh Island in Devon.

Name	Known for	Hometown	Status
Christine McGuinness (Note: Christine and Duncan were a duo when the hunt began)	Television personality & model	Liverpool	Winners
Duncan James	Blue singer & actor	Wiltshire	Winners
Giovanni Pernice (Note: Giovanni and Kai were a duo when the hunt began)	Strictly Come Dancing professional	Palermo, Sicily	Caught
Denise Welch (Note: Denise and Lincoln were a duo when the hunt began)	Actress & television presenter	Tynemouth	Caught
Lincoln Townley	Painter & former publicist	London	Caught
Danielle Harold (Note: Danielle and Kimberly were a duo when the hunt began)	Former EastEnders actress	London	Caught
Kimberly Hart-Simpson	Former Coronation Street actress	Rhyl	Caught
Kai Widdrington	Strictly Come Dancing professional	Southampton	Caught
Simon McCoy (Note: Lucrezia and Simon were a duo when the hunt began)	Journalist	Cotswolds	Caught
Zeze Millz (Note: David and ZeZe were a duo when the hunt began)	Internet personality	London	Caught
Lucrezia Millarini	Journalist	London	Caught
David Whitely	Internet personality	Birmingham	Caught

=== Series 7 (2026) ===
Filmed in summer 2025, the series began airing on 3 August 2026. The celebrities below took part in the seventh series. They were released from helicopters at the Old Royal Naval College at Greenwich in London and the winners were extracted from the Black Rock Sands beach in North Wales.

Name	Known for	Hometown	Status
Amy Dowden (Note: Dowden and Gu are a duo when the hunt began)	Professional dancer	Caerphilly	Winners
Carlos Gu	Professional dancer	Taiyuan, China	Winners
Brian Conley (Note: Brian and Lucy Conley are a duo when the hunt began)	Actor and comedian	London	Winners
Lucy Conley	Actor and comedian	London	Winners
Scarlette Douglas (Note: Scarlette and Stuart Douglas are a duo when the hunt began)	TV presenter	London	Caught
JJ Chalmers (Note: Chalmers and Morgan are a duo when the hunt began)	Olympian and presenter	Edinburgh	Caught
Sophie Morgan	TV presenter	Crowborough	Caught
Stuart Douglas	TV presenter	Enfield	Caught
Jen Brister (Note: Brister and Smyth are a duo when the hunt began)	Comedian	London	Caught
Laura Smyth	Comedian	London	Caught
Toby Aromolaran (Note: Aromolaran and Taylor are a duo when the hunt began)	TV personality	Chafford Hundred	Caught
Chris Taylor	TV personality	Leicester	Caught

== Ratings ==
=== Hunted ===
==== Series 1 (2015) ====
Episode no.	Air date	Viewers (millions)	Channel 4 weekly ranking
1	10 September 2015	2.89	3
2	17 September 2015	2.45	3
3	24 September 2015	1.99 (Note: Ratings for these episodes do not include Channel 4 +1.)	3
4	1 October 2015	1.77	4
5	8 October 2015	1.95	4
6	15 October 2015	2.02	7
Series average		2.18	—N/a

==== Series 2 (2016) ====
Episode no.	Air date	Viewers (millions)	Channel 4 weekly ranking
1	22 September 2016	2.52	1
2	29 September 2016	2.39	1
3	6 October 2016	2.27	3
4	13 October 2016	2.08	2
5	20 October 2016	2.08	3
6	27 October 2016	2.19	1
Series average		2.26	—N/a

==== Series 3 (2018) ====
Episode no.	Air date	Viewers (millions)	Channel 4 weekly ranking
1	4 January 2018	2.73	5
2	11 January 2018	2.98	2
3	18 January 2018	2.89	2
4	25 January 2018	2.58	2
5	1 February 2018	2.59	2
6	8 February 2018	2.69	3
Series average		2.74	—N/a

==== Series 4 (2019) ====
Episode no.	Air date	Viewers (millions)	Channel 4 weekly ranking
1	10 January 2019	2.26	2
2	17 January 2019	2.29	2
3	24 January 2019	2.54	2
4	31 January 2019	2.47	2
5	7 February 2019	2.21	3
6	14 February 2019	2.54	1
Series average		2.39	—N/a

==== Series 5 (2020) ====
Episode no.	Air date	Viewers (millions)	Channel 4 weekly ranking
1	13 February 2020	2.56	1
2	20 February 2020	2.64	2
3	27 February 2020	2.18	2
4	5 March 2020	2.46	2
5	12 March 2020	2.56	3
6	19 March 2020	2.74	3
Series average		2.52	—N/a

=== Celebrity Hunted ===
==== Series 1 (2017) ====
Episode no.	Air date	Viewers (millions)	Channel 4 weekly ranking
1	10 October 2017	3.11	3
2	17 October 2017	2.91	3
3	24 October 2017	3.07	3
4	31 October 2017	2.97	3
Series average		3.02	—N/a

==== Series 2 (2018) ====
Episode no.	Air date	Viewers (millions)	Channel 4 weekly ranking
1	16 October 2018	3.44	3
2	23 October 2018	2.86	3
3	30 October 2018	3.56	3
4	6 November 2018	2.78	2
5	13 November 2018	2.90	2
Series average		3.11	—N/a

==== Series 3 (2019) ====
Episode no.	Air date	Viewers (millions)	Channel 4 weekly ranking
1	13 October 2019	2.89	3
2	20 October 2019	1.22	3
3	27 October 2019	2.50	5
4	3 November 2019	2.82	4
5	10 November 2019	2.43	4
Series average		2.77	—N/a

== Production ==
Each Fugitive is filmed by a dedicated cameraman, who follows them throughout their time on the run. While filming, the production team is split in two so that the team working with the Hunters are separate from the team working with the Fugitives, to provide a more realistic experience and prevent information leaking between them. Freedom of Information requests are submitted by the Hunters to find the location of state-owned CCTV cameras positioned throughout the British mainland. When real footage could not be obtained, producers' cameras capture footage that would have been available to the state, which is stored on a central database for the Hunters to access if requested.

The Hunters are overseen by Kevin O’Leary, an independent adjudicator and former Head of Covert Operations for the Metropolitan Police who does not appear on the show. O'Leary's role as an adjudicator is to make sure that the information requested and gathered by the Hunters reflected the information that would be available to them in real life and within the appropriate time frame. O'Leary is the only person who has the power to release information to the Hunters and would only do so when considered that the Hunters have completed sufficient detective work to justify access to the information.

In the broadcasts, the Hunters HQ is assumed to be in central London – The Gherkin office block in the City of London is often prominent in helicopter shots of the HQ. In reality the HQ is located in rented office space around London. For the seventh series of Celebrity Hunted, the HQ was located in The Shepherds Building in Shepherds Bush, west London.

== Critical reception ==
The Telegraph review complimented the series, saying the "game show element was very effective, playing with our instinctive tendency to take the side of the pursued, and skilfully edited to keep the tension high". The Daily Mirror's Adam Postan described the series as "the biggest TV joke of the year", pointing out that most of the surveillance powers were replicated by methods that were unexplained.

== International versions ==
In the United States, the show was produced by Endemol Shine North America under the same title Hunted, which premiered on 22 January 2017 on CBS. This version lasted only one season.

In Spain, the show was produced by Movistar+ in collaboration with Shine Iberia under the title La huida ("The Escape"), which premiered on 8 April 2016 on #0. This version lasted only one season.

In Denmark, the show is produced by Metronome Productions A/S, in 2016 under the title Menneskejagt ("Manhunt"), which premiered on 24 August 2016 on DR3. In 2021 the show was revived and renamed to Jaget vildt: Kendte på flugt ("Hunted wild: Celebrities on the run"), which premiered on 7 January 2021 on discovery+ and Kanal 5.

In Russia, the show was produced by WeiT Media under the title Okhota (Russian: Охота; "The Hunt"), which premiered on 17 September 2016 on free-to-air network NTV. This version lasted only one season.

In the Netherlands, the show is produced by SimpelZodiak and commissioned by AVROTROS under the same title Hunted, which premiered on 17 October 2016 on NPO 3. In early 2021 Hunted VIPS premiered, in which Dutch celebrities are hunted. In early 2022 Hunted: Into The Wild premiered, in which participants are hunted in the wilds of another European country. In April 2024 Hunted: Into The Wild VIPS premiered, in which Dutch celebrities are hunted in the wilds.

In France, the show was produced by Endemol Shine Group and commissioned by RMC Découverte under the title Escape, 21 jours pour disparaître ("Escape, 21 days to disappear"), which premiered in 2018 and ended in 2019. In 2021, the French version of Celebrity Hunted was first available as an Amazon Original.

In Italy, Celebrity Hunted is the first non-fiction Italian product of Amazon Prime Video, which commissioned it to Endemol Shine Group. Production started in 2019, and the first season was released in 2020. A second season was released in 2021.

The German version of Celebrity Hunted was also an Amazon Original, first available in 2021. At the end, viewers were invited to sign up for a series. This version lasted only one season.

An Australian version under the same title Hunted, was commissioned in 2021 for Network 10, began casting in July 2021 and premiered on 17 July 2022 after filming in early 2022, with former British chief hunter Ben Owens as Deputy Intelligence.

The Norwegian version of Celebrity Hunted, named Jaget, first aired in 2023 on TVNorge and HBO Max.

Legend:

Currently airing franchise
Franchise with an upcoming season
Franchise no longer airing
Status unknown

Country/Region	Title	Network(s)	Winners
Australia	Hunted	Network 10	Season 1, 2022: Robert "Rob" Harneiss & Stathi Vamvoulidis; Season 2, 2023: James "Jimi" Love & Holly Colvin; Season 3, 2024: Andy Dunt
Belgium	Klopjacht	Play4	Season 1, 2021: Gianni Decru & Stacey Vuylsteke; Laid & Cifdine Hadj Abdallah; Season 2, 2022: No-one; Season 3, 2023: Marisya & Meredith; Season 4, 2026: Werner
Belgium	Klopjacht Celebs	GoPlay	Season 1, 2022: No-one
Belgium	Celebrity Klopjacht	Play4	Season 1, 2024: No-one
Denmark	Menneskejagt	DR3	Season 1, 2016: No-one
Denmark	Jaget vildt: Kendte på flugt	Kanal 5 (2021–) discovery+ (2021–2023); Max/HBO Max (2024–)	Season 1, 2021: Mark Madsen & Patrik Wozniacki; Season 2, 2021: Michael Maze & Mikkel Kessler, Mille Gori & Micky Skeel; Season 3, 2022: No-one; Season 4, 2023: Mette Cornelius & Mahamad Habane; Season 5, 2024: Heino & Cecilia Hansen; Season 6, 2025: Vlado Lentz & Christian Berthelsen, Uffe Holm & Torben Chris; Season 7, 2026: Rasmus Botoft & Lisbeth Wulff, Irina Olsen & Victoria Babenko
France	Escape, 21 jours pour disparaître	RMC Story; RMC Découverte	Season 1, 2018: Jean-Philippe; Season 2, 2019: No-one
France	Celebrity Hunted: Chasse a l'homme	Prime Video France	Season 1, 2021: Darcy, Ramzy Bedia, Franck Gastambide, Laure Manaudou & Florent Manaudou; Season 2, 2022: Fadily Camara & Hakim Jemili; Season 3, 2023: Michaël Youn & Vincent Desagnat
Germany	Celebrity Hunted – Jede Spur kann dich verraten	Prime Video Germany	Season 1, 2021: Wladimir Klitschko
Italy	Celebrity Hunted: Caccia all'uomo	Prime Video Italy	Season 1, 2020: Claudio Santamaria & Francesca Barra; Fedez & Luis Sal; Season 2, 2021: Myss Keta & Elodie; Season 3, 2022: Salvatore Esposito & Marco D'Amore; Season 4, 2024: No-one
Netherlands	Hunted (Dutch TV series)	NPO 3 (2016–2023); NPO 1 (2024–)	Season 1, 2016: Evert; Season 2, 2017: Omar; Season 3, 2018: Sophie; Season 4, 2019: Koen & Juul; Season 5, 2020: Armani & Maarten; Season 6, 2021: No-one; Season 7, 2022: Sanne & Siedo; Season 8, 2023: No-one; Season 9, 2024: Luc & Pim, Anne & Noor; Season 10, 2025: No-one
Netherlands	Hunted VIPS	NPO 3 (2016–2023); NPO 1 (2024–)	Season 1, 2021: Dennis Weening; Season 2, 2022: Nasrdin Dchar, Kelvin Boerma, Tatum Dagelet & Mingus Dagelet; Season 3, 2023: Sylvana IJsselmuiden & Sandra Ysbrandy, Jeroen Stomphorst & Sjoerd van Ramshorst; Season 4, 2025: Diorno Braaf, Willem Voogd & Britte Lagcher; Season 5, 2026: Jetske van den Elsen & Joris Linssen
Netherlands	Hunted: Into The Wild	NPO 3 (2016–2023); NPO 1 (2024–)	Season 1, 2022: Rick & Laura
Netherlands	Hunted: Into The Wild VIPS	NPO 3 (2016–2023); NPO 1 (2024–)	Season 1, 2024: No-one
Norway	Jaget (Norwegian TV series)	TVNorge; HBO Max	Season 1, 2023: Petter Schjerven & Odd-Bjørn Hjelmeset; Season 2, 2024: Geir Aker & Thomas Numme, Nils Jakob Hoff & Therese Johaug, Isaac Dreyer; Season 3, 2025: Nicolai Cleve Broch & Trond Fausa Aurvåg, Johannes Roaldsen Fürst & Torjus Tveiten; Season 4, 2026: Upcoming season
Russia	Оkhota (Russian: Охота)	NTV	Season 1, 2016: TBC
Spain	La huida	#0	Season 1, 2016: Antonio & Roberto
United States	Hunted	CBS	Season 1, 2017: English King & Stephen King; Lee Wilson & Hilmar Skagfield
