= Tidal river (disambiguation) =

A tidal river is a river whose flow and level are influenced by tides.

Tidal River may also refer to:

- Tidal River, Victoria, a locality in Wilsons Promontory National Park, Wilsons Promontory, Victoria, Australia
- Tidal River (Victoria), a perennial river of the West Gippsland catchment, in the Wilsons Promontory region of Victoria, Australia
