= Darby River, Victoria =

Darby River
- Town
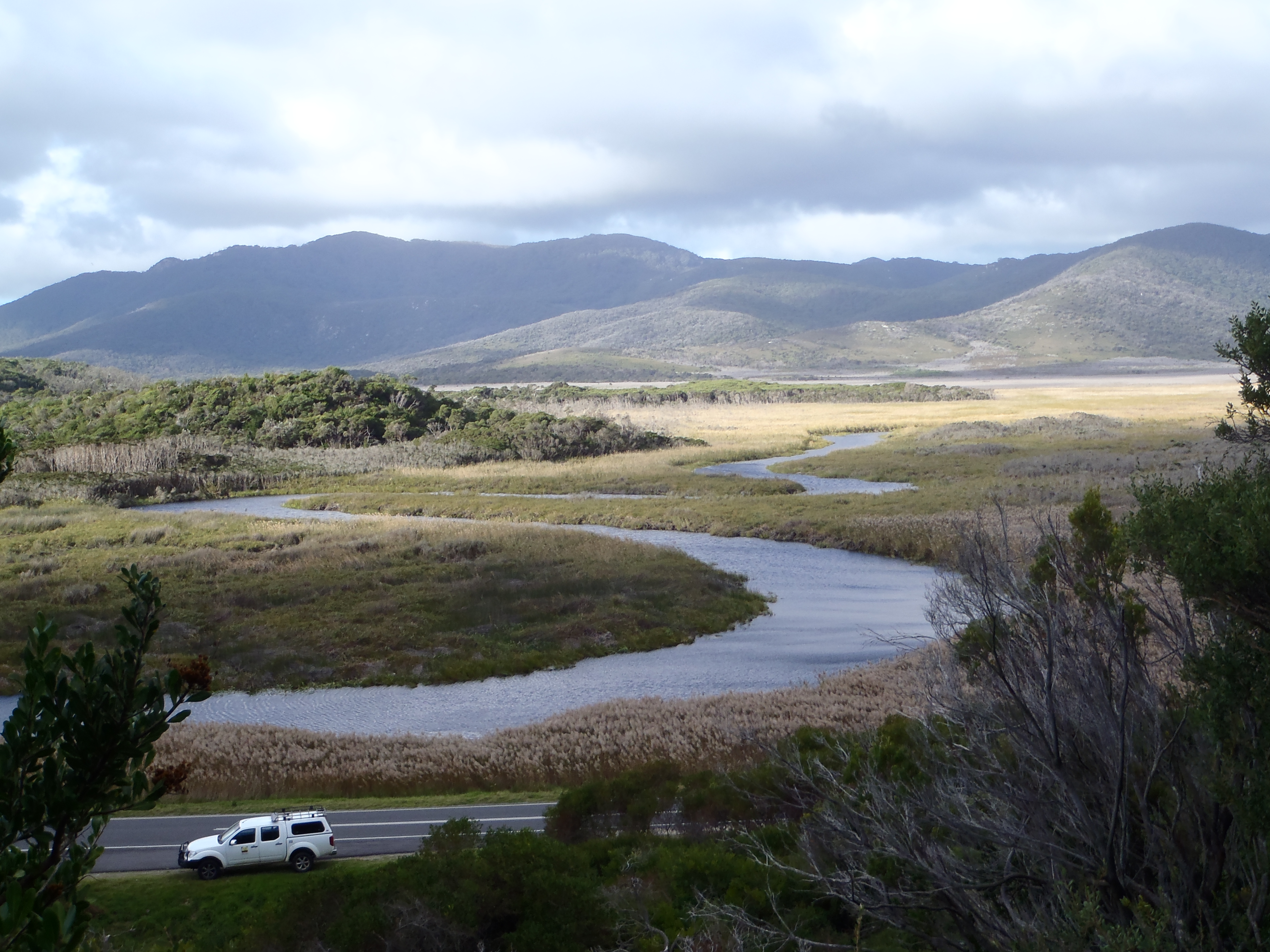
- Darby River meanders looking north east from foot of Darby Hill

- Coordinates: 38°58′35″S 146°16′40″E
- Country: Australia
- State: Victoria
- LGA: South Gippsland Shire
- Location: 241 km (150 mi) SE of Melbourne; 46 km (29 mi) SE of Fish Creek

Government
  - State electorate: Gippsland South
  - Federal division: McMillan
- Elevation: 2 m (6.6 ft)

Population
  - Total: 0 (?)
- Postcode: 3959

Darby River is a locality in Gippsland in southeastern Victoria, Australia. Located within Wilson's Promontory National Park, it was the location of the original park entrance, ranger station and accommodation centre from 1909 until the Second World War. Often referred to just as The Darby, it was the location of the National Park Committee of Management Rooms from about 1909, a Ranger's cottage from 1913, and the 'Chalet' for tourist accommodation from 1923. The Chalet began as a small 6 room building and expanded to more than 24 accommodation rooms, kitchen, dining hall, bathrooms and the like. During World War Two the area was the site of the Headquarters Camp of the No 7 Commando Training Centre. At this time large numbers of huts and tents were erected and the Chalet was taken over for the Officers Mess. Following the war most of the buildings were removed or fell into disrepair and were demolished. The Ranger's House was moved to Tidal River.
