= Darby River =

River in Victoria, Australia

Darby
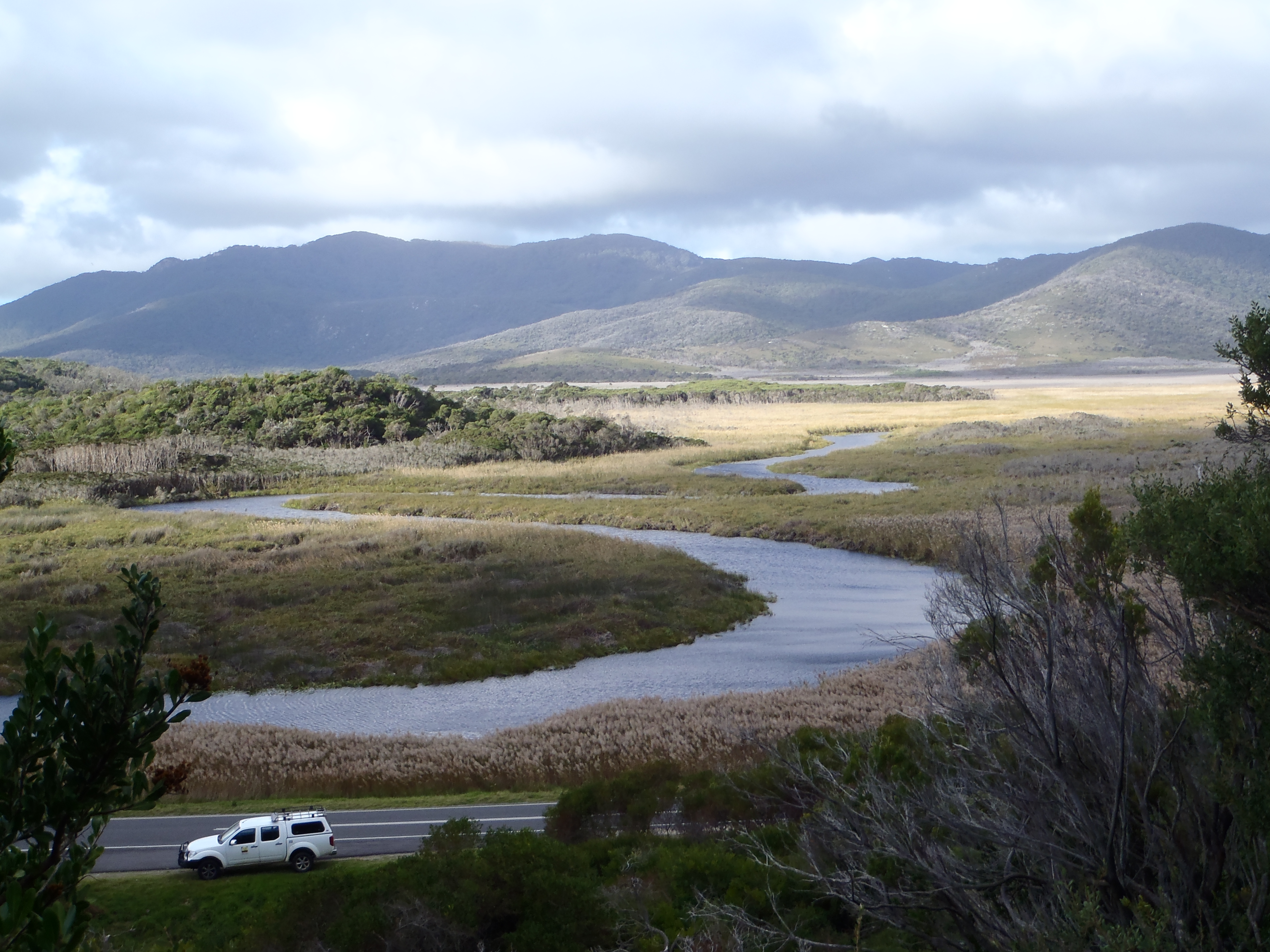
- Darby River, as it meanders, looking north east from the foot of Darby Hill

- Mouth of the Darby River in Victoria

Location
- Country: Australia
- State: Victoria
- Region: South East Coastal Plain (IBRA), South Gippsland
- Local government area: South Gippsland Shire

Physical characteristics
- Source: Latrobe Range
  - location: below Mount Latrobe
  - coordinates: 38°59′10″S 146°20′19″E
  - elevation: 310 m (1,020 ft)
- Mouth: Whisky Bay, Bass Strait
  - location: Wilsons Promontory
  - coordinates: 38°58′19″S 146°16′3″E
  - elevation: 0 m (0 ft)
- Length: 7 km (4.3 mi)
- Discharge
  - location: mouth

Basin features
- River system: West Gippsland catchment
- National park: Wilson's Promontory NP

The Darby River, a perennial river of the West Gippsland catchment, is located in the South Gippsland region of the Australian state of Victoria.

== Location and features ==
The Darby River rises below Mount Latrobe, part of the Latrobe Range, north of Wilsons Promontory and flows generally west by southwest before reaching its river mouth and emptying on Darby Beach within Bass Strait in the South Gippsland Shire. The river descends 301 metres (988 ft) over its combined 7-kilometre (4.3 mi) course. The river is in relatively pristine condition, with the only human interference being a bridge at the estuary. Native fish species include common galaxias, pouched lamprey, short-finned eel, tupong, flat-headed gudgeon and southern pigmy perch.

The Darby River is contained entirely within the Wilson's Promontory National Park. The park entrance, ranger station and accommodation centre was located near Darby River from 1909 until World War II. These facilities moved to Tidal River thereafter.

The river is traversed by the Wilsons Promontory Road near the river mouth. Heavy rains in March 2011 caused unprecedented flooding of the river, damaging the bridge carrying the Wilsons Promontory Road over the river; and stranding hundreds of campers who had to be evacuated by helicopter.

== See also ==
- List of rivers of Australia § Victoria
