= Tidal River (Victoria) =

River in Victoria, Australia

Tidal
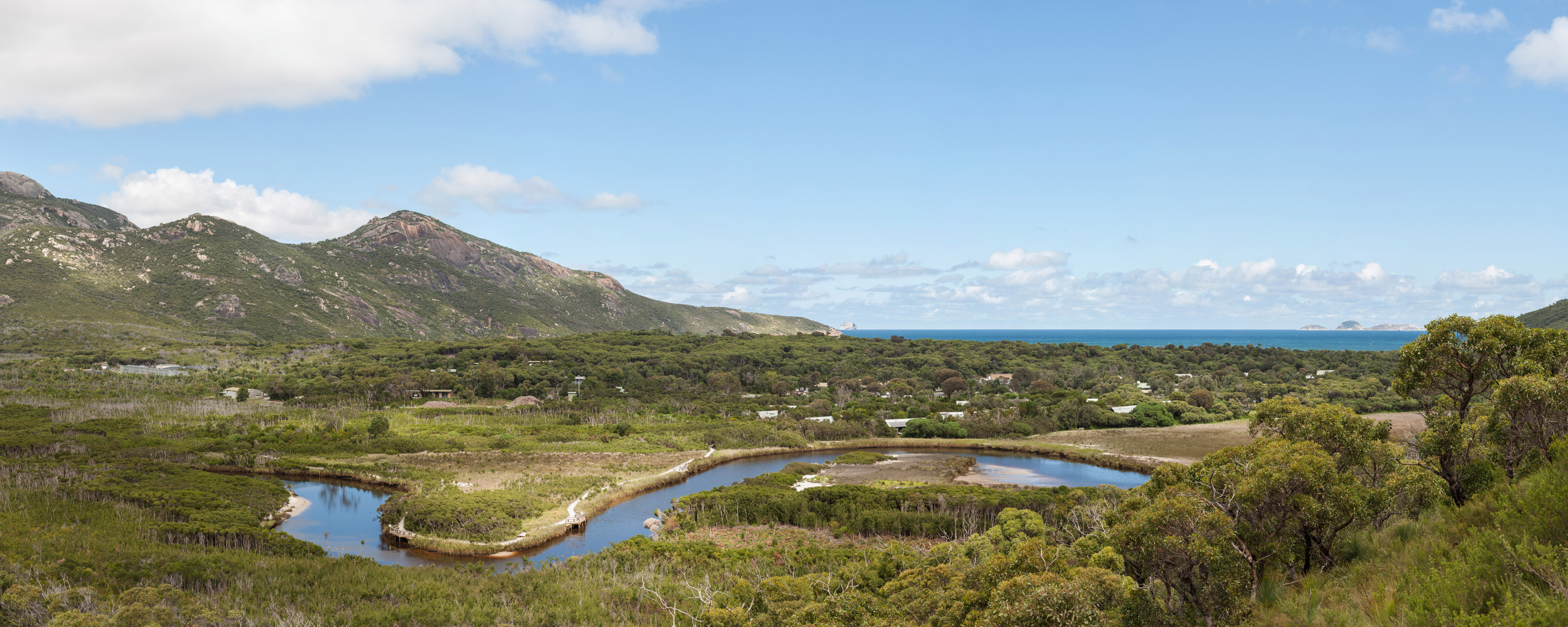
- Tidal River and the camp ground looking south

- Location of the Tidal River mouth in Victoria

Location
- Country: Australia
- State: Victoria
- Region: Furneaux (IBRA), South Gippsland, Wilsons Promontory
- Local government area: South Gippsland Shire
- Town: Tidal River settlement

Physical characteristics
- Source: Mount Latrobe, Wilson Range
  - coordinates: 39°0′37″S 146°22′30″E
  - elevation: 367 m (1,204 ft)
- Mouth: Norman Bay, then Bass Strait
  - location: Tidal River settlement
  - coordinates: 39°2′6″S 146°18′46″E
  - elevation: 0 m (0 ft)
- Length: 6 km (3.7 mi)

Basin features
- River system: West Gippsland catchment
- National park: Wilsons Promontory NP

The Tidal River is a perennial river of the West Gippsland catchment, in the Wilsons Promontory region of the Australian state of Victoria. A permanent camping ground which the river flows passed to the south is also called Tidal River.

== Location and features ==
The Tidal River rises below Mount Latrobe, part of the Wilson Range within the Wilsons Promontory National Park, and flows generally west by south before reaching its mouth within Norman Bay at the seasonal settlement of Tidal River, and emptying into Bass Strait. The river descends 367 metres (1,204 ft) over its 6-kilometre (3.7 mi) course.

The colour of the Tidal River ranges from a deep-yellow (in shallower areas) to a dark-purple and almost black (in its deeper depths). This discolouration is due to the large number of tea trees present in the area. The trees dye the river, making it appear like black tea (hence the name 'tea tree'). Even though the water is very clean and clear, it is impossible to see to the bottom in the deep areas. Few water creatures inhabit the river.

== Etymology ==
As its name suggests, Tidal River swells with the tide. When a high tide occurs at the same time as a large amount of precipitation, the river can flood the tracks and boardwalks surrounding the area. The river runs into Norman Beach, one of the 'safer' beaches of the promontory. Because of its proximity to the beach and the types of rocks in the area, the Tidal River bed is composed purely of fine sand. The sand can be walked on when the tide it is low. However, it is very squishy and squelchy, due to the fineness of the sand particles mixed with the surrounding dirt.

== Walking and hiking ==
Tidal River settlement is the starting point of numerous short and not-so-short walks. Probably the most popular is the overnight hike, the Great Prom Walk, to South Point and the Wilsons Promontory Lighthouse on South East Point. South Point (the most southerly point of the Australian mainland) is mostly unremarkable of itself, and is easily overshadowed by South East Point, the site of the Wilsons Promontory Lighthouse. The hike to the Wilsons Promontory Lighthouse, with detour to South Point, is over 25 kilometres (16 mi). The return walk, via a different path (and no detour) is a little over 20 kilometres (12 mi).

One of the most popular walks for campers staying at the Tidal River campsite is the 3-kilometre (1.9 mi) Squeaky Beach walk, an enjoyable walk which passes over the ridge separating Norman and Squeaky Beach. As its name suggests, Squeaky Beach, squeaks when walked on (an example of singing sand). This is due to the ultra-fine quartz sand particles, all of which are the same size and shape. The beach is very popular among children as it has many large rocks that can be climbed. The water, however, is very rough and often full of rips. The beach also has a small stream, similar in colour to Tidal River.

== The campground ==
Tidal River is the main location for accommodation and camping in Wilsons Promontory National Park. Tidal River Campground has 484 camping and caravan sites (including 20 powered sites) situated near the beach and river. There are also 11 remote walk-in sites located within the park.

Tidal River camping ground is nestled in sand dunes behind Norman Bay, on the western side of the peninsula. The only road open to visitors leads from Yanakie at the park entrance to Tidal River, a distance of 32 kilometres (20 mi).

When fully occupied, the settlement of Tidal River swells to over 2,000 people. There is a visitor centre open daily, a general store which serves basic supermarket and emergency items, a service station, fish and chippery and café. The outdoor cinema, established in the late 1940s, is a nostalgic favourite amongst summer campers who will sometimes line up for over an hour before tickets can be bought so they can save a seat in the front row with a blanket.

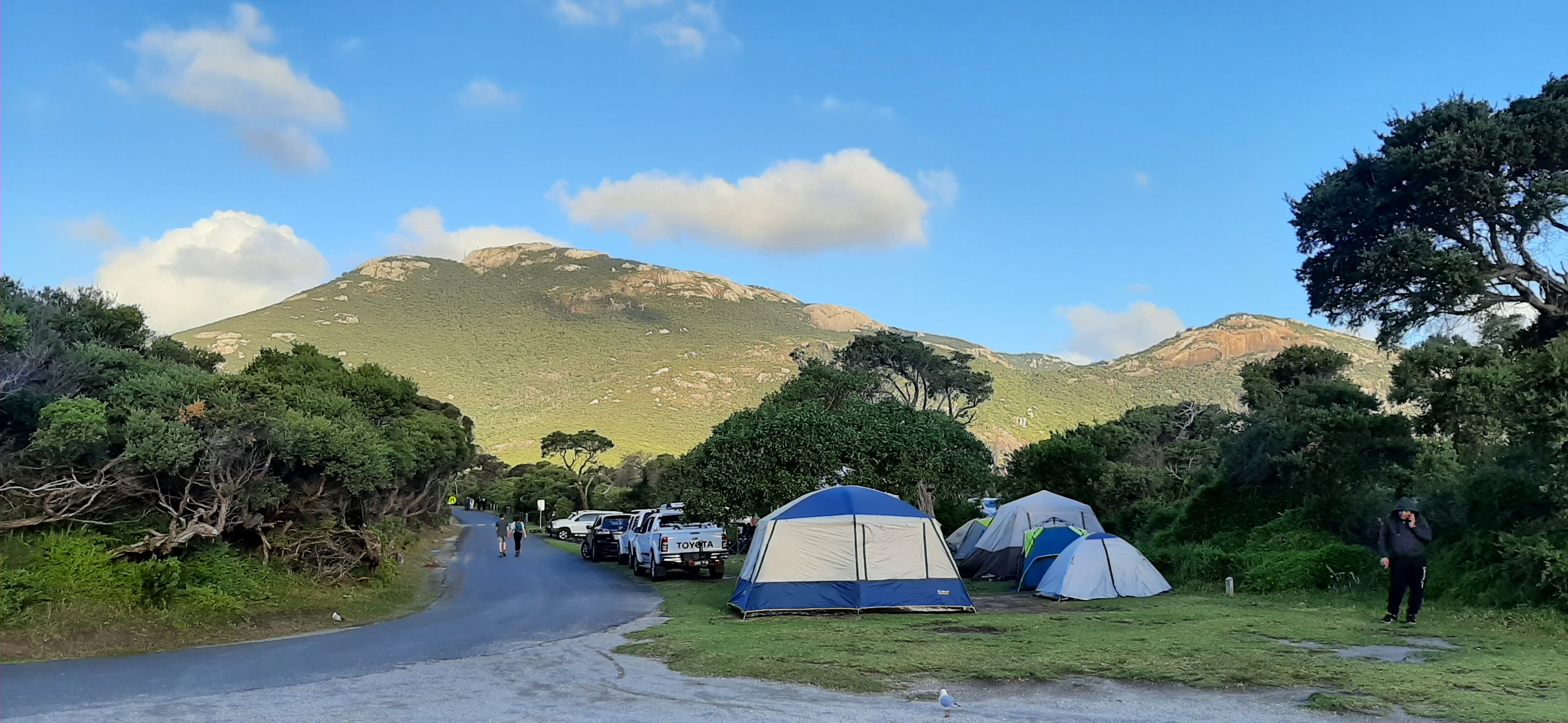
Campground at Tidal River

During summer a ballot is held to allocate sites from Christmas until late January. Regardless of the time of year, all accommodation must be pre-booked.

In recent years Parks Victoria has introduced a rotating schedule of environmental restoration days, where volunteers staying at Tidal River can help rehabilitate dune vegetation and assist in wildlife monitoring projects. Despite its seasonal bustle, the settlement remains carefully regulated to minimise its ecological footprint, with strict limits on lighting, noise, and the use of generators to protect the nocturnal wildlife that moves through the campground at night.

== See also ==
- List of rivers of Australia § Victoria
