= South East Point =

Southerly tip of Wilsons Promontory, Victoria, Australia

- Cape
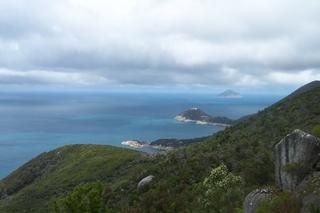
- South East Point

- Coordinates: 39°07′S 146°25′E
- Location: Wilsons Promontory, Victoria, Australia
- Offshore water bodies: Bass Strait

South East Point lies on the southerly tip of Wilsons Promontory, Victoria, Australia. It commands sensational views of Bass Strait and is a major landmark for all ships traveling between the southern Australian ports (Melbourne, Adelaide, Perth) and the Pacific Ocean.

South East Point is the site of the Wilsons Promontory Lighthouse. The only access for visitors is a full-day hike from the Tidal River camping ground.

South East Point on Wilsons Promontory is one of the southerly points of the Australian mainland, but another point on Wilsons Promontory, South Point, is located still further in the south.
