= Thomas Musgrave (castaway) =

British ship captain & lighthouse keeper (1832–1891)

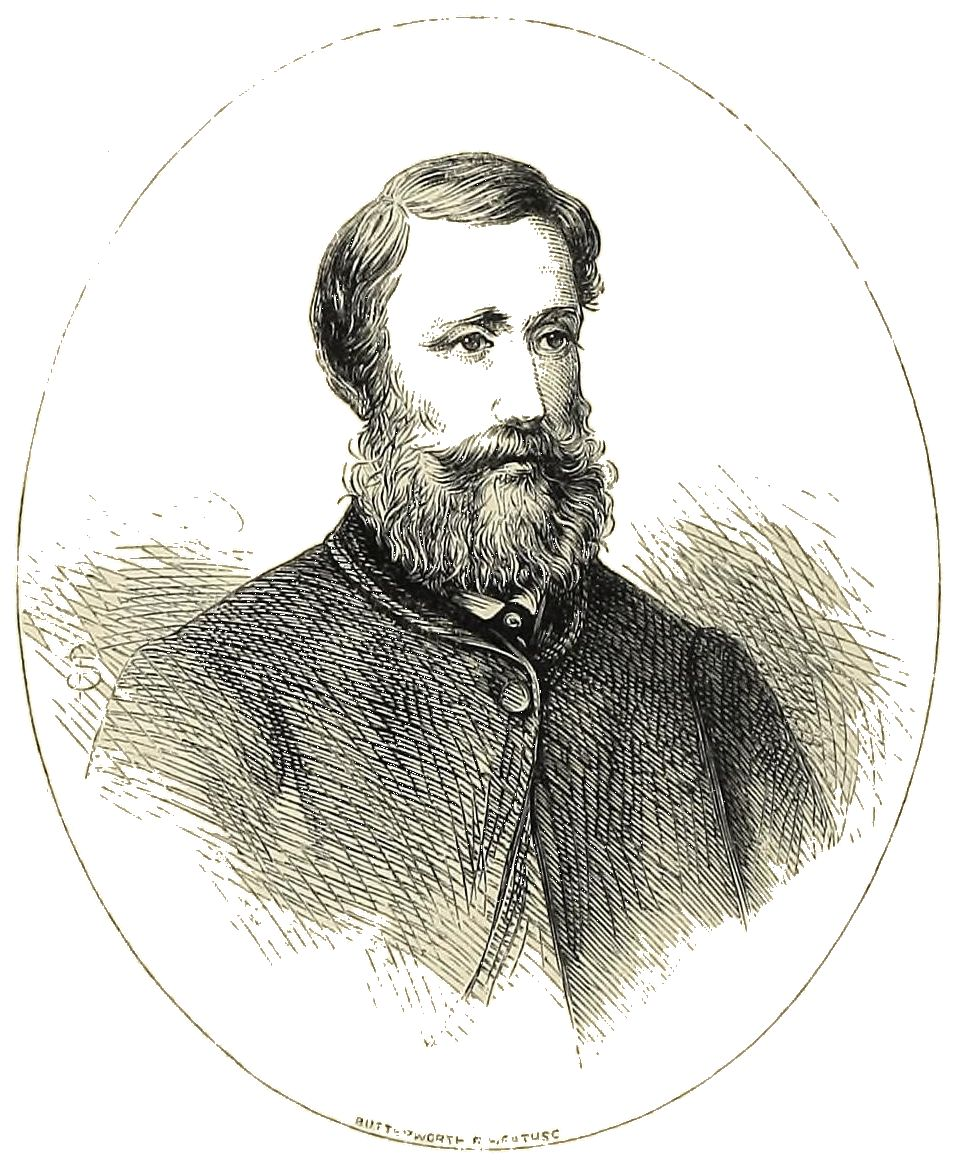
1866 depiction of Thomas Musgrave

Thomas Musgrave FRGS (10 May 1832 – 7 November 1891) was the captain of an Australian ship and later a lighthouse keeper, who was wrecked with the schooner Grafton in the subantarctic Auckland Islands, and cast away there for over 18 months.

== Early years ==
Musgrave was born in Durham, in north-eastern England, the eldest son of Richard Musgrave and Margaret Bailie. He first went to sea at the age of 16, from Liverpool in 1848. He married Catherine Halcrow Sinclair in 1854 in Saint John, New Brunswick, Canada. He moved with his family to Australia in 1858 where he was based for the rest of his life.

== Shipwreck ==
Musgrave's final voyage as a ship's captain began in 1863, leaving Sydney on 12 November on a prospecting and sealing expedition to Campbell Island and the Auckland Islands south of New Zealand. The ship was wrecked in Carnley Harbour, Auckland Island, at the beginning of January 1864, and the ship's company of five people were stranded until they were able to refashion the ship's dinghy, with three of them, including Musgrave, sailing it 400 km to Stewart Island in July 1865 to obtain rescue. He subsequently wrote Castaway on the Auckland Isles about his experiences.

== Lighthouse keeping ==
After being reunited with his family in 1865, Musgrave promised his wife that he would never go far out at sea again. In 1867 he started work as a maritime pilot at Lakes Entrance, Victoria. In 1869, he began his career as a lighthouse keeper along the Victorian coast when he was put in charge of Wilsons Promontory Lighthouse. Subsequent postings were to the lighthouses at Gabo Island (1878), Cape Schanck (1884), Cape Otway (1887), and finally to Point Lonsdale Lighthouse.

Musgrave died at the age of 59, seven months after the death of his wife, with whom he is buried at Queenscliffe, Victoria. During their 37-year marriage Catherine Musgrave bore 16 children, including three sets of twins. Nine of their children predeceased them, many in infancy.
