= Wilsons Promontory Lighthouse =

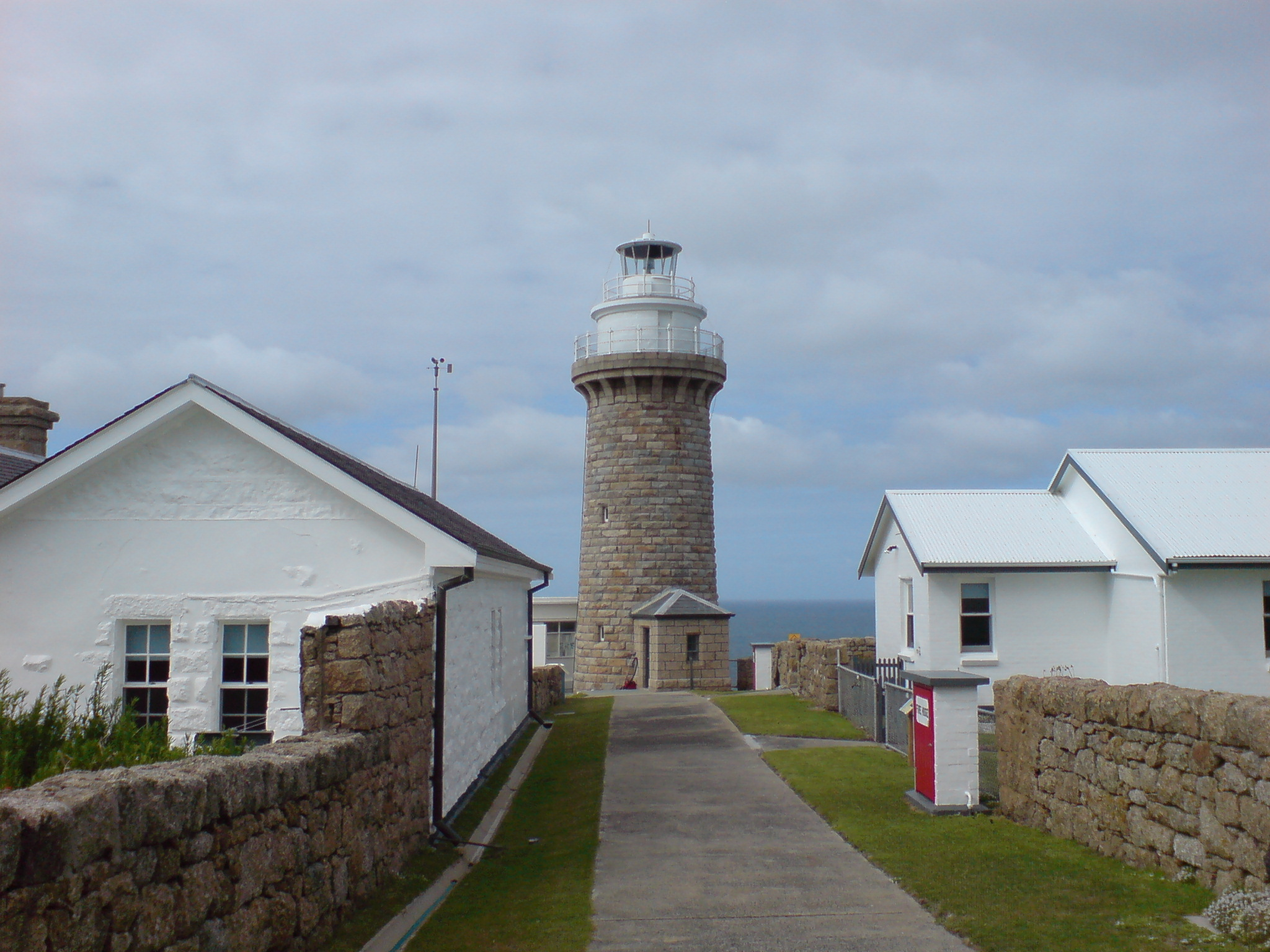
- Wilsons Promontory Lighthouse
- Location: Wilsons Promontory; Victoria; Australia
- Coordinates: 39°07′46.6″S 146°25′27.3″E

Tower
- Constructed: 1859
- Construction: granite tower
- Automated: 1993
- Height: 19 metres (62 ft)
- Shape: cylindrical tower with balcony and lantern
- Markings: unpainted grey tower, white balcony and lantern
- Power source: solar power
- Operator: Parks Victoria
- Heritage: Victorian War Heritage Inventory listing, National Trust of Australia (Victoria) listing, listed on the Victorian Heritage Register, listed on the Commonwealth Heritage List

Light
- First lit: 1859
- Focal height: 117 metres (384 ft)
- Intensity: 51,000 cd
- Range: 18 nautical miles (33 km; 21 mi)
- Characteristic: Fl W 7.5s

Wilsons Promontory Lighthouse is situated on South East Point, Wilsons Promontory, Victoria, Australia. From its point on the peninsula, it commands almost 360° views of Bass Strait. The Wilson's Promontory lighthouse is the southernmost lighthouse on mainland Australia, and is approximately 18 kilometres (11 mi) from the nearest town, Tidal River. Dormitory-style accommodation is available in the lighthouse.

The lighthouse protects shipping travelling through Bass Strait. The Wilsons Promontory Lighthouse is the main part of the Wilsons Promontory Lightstation.

== History ==
The lighthouse was constructed with the use of convict labour over a period of approximately seven years starting in 1853 through to completion in 1859. The lighthouse stands 19 metres (62 ft) tall and along with the keeper's cottage is constructed from local granite. From 1869 to 1878 the lighthouse keeper was Captain Thomas Musgrave.

== See also ==
- List of lighthouses in Australia
