= Wilsons Promontory =

Peninsula in Victoria, Australia

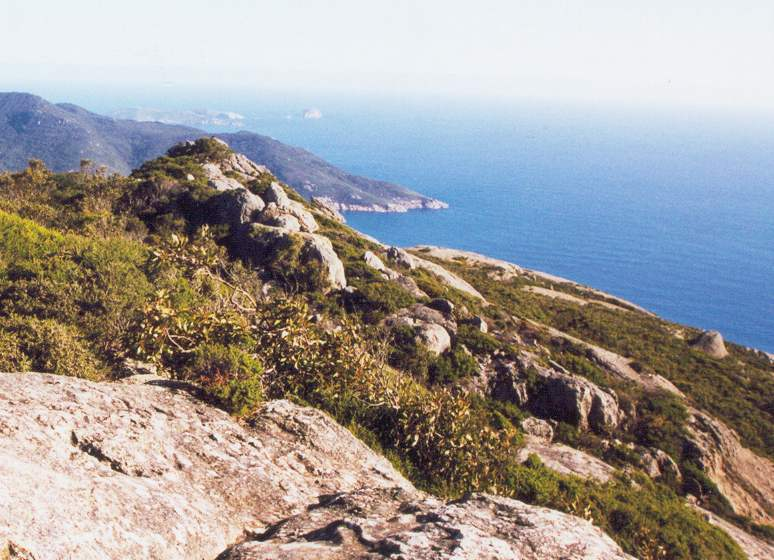
- Looking south from Mount Oberon on Wilsons Promontory towards the southern tip of the Australian mainland, 2005.

- Location within Victoria
- Location: Gippsland, Victoria, Australia
- Coordinates: 39°02′S 146°23′E

Wilsons Promontory, colloquially known as Wilsons Prom or The Prom, is a peninsula that forms the southernmost part of the Australian mainland, located in the state of Victoria.

South Point at 39°08′06″S 146°22′32″E is the southernmost tip of Wilsons Promontory and hence of mainland Australia. Located at nearby South East Point, (39°07′S 146°25′E) is the Wilsons Promontory Lighthouse. Most of the peninsula is protected by the Wilsons Promontory National Park and the Wilsons Promontory Marine National Park.

== Human history ==
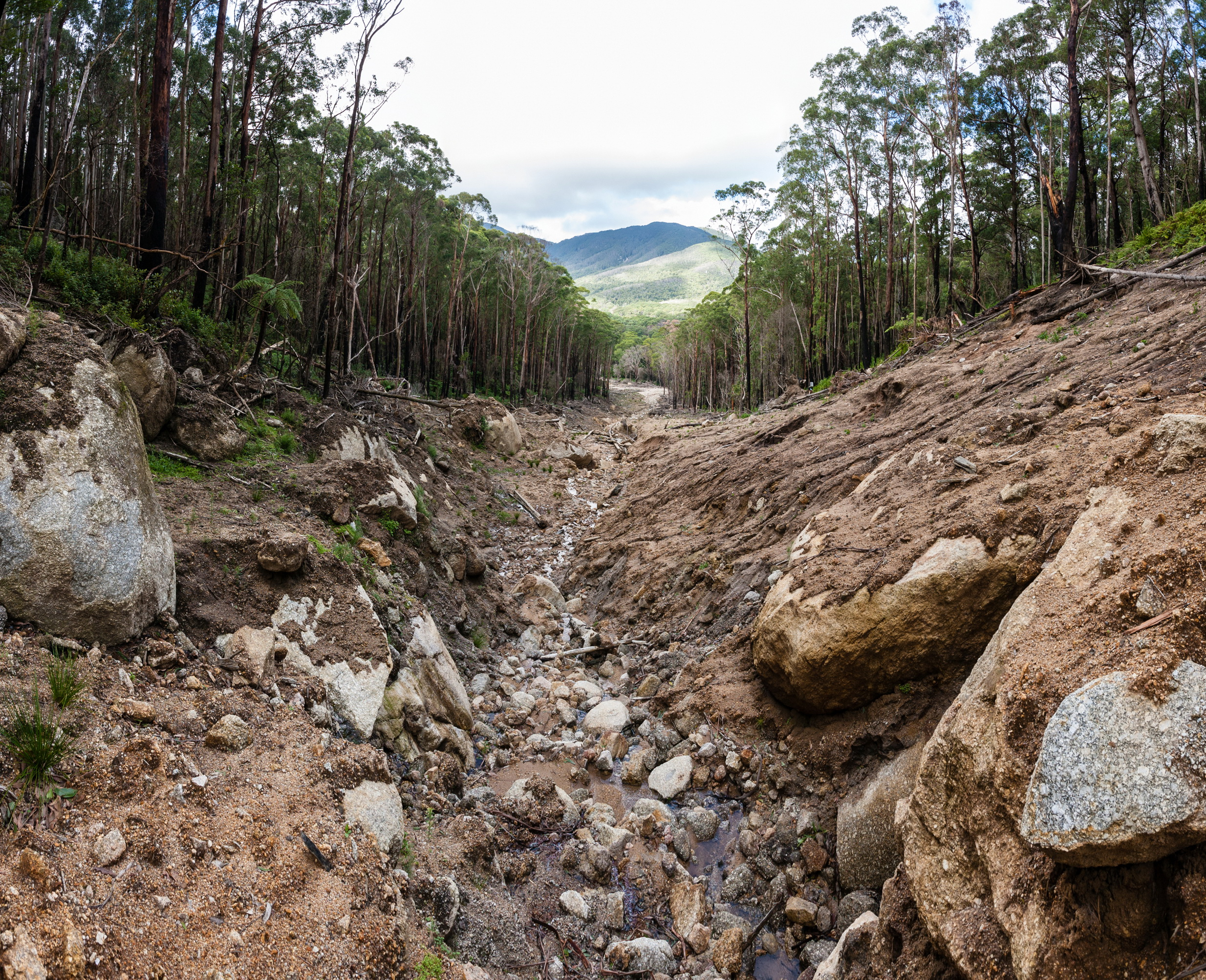
Erosion damage caused by the March 2011 floods, as viewed southwards towards Lilly Pilly Gully, March 2012.

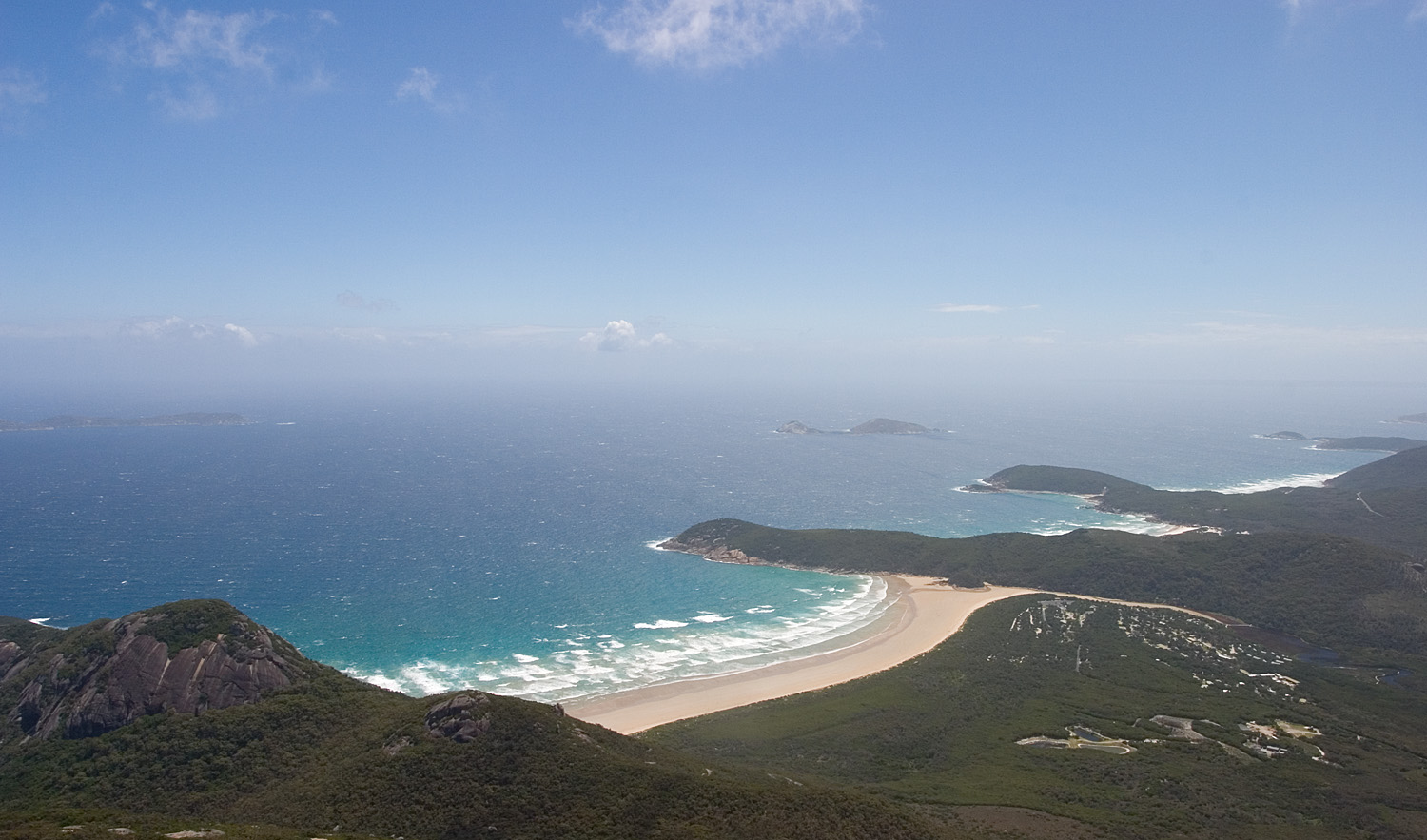
Tidal River as viewed from the summit of Mount Oberon. The settlement of Tidal River is visible in the bottom-right corner, 2004

The promontory was first occupied by indigenous Koori people at least 6,500 years prior to European arrival. Middens along the western coast indicate that seafood was an important part of their diet.

The promontory is mentioned in Aboriginal dreamtime stories, including the Bollum-Boukan, Loo-errn and Tiddalik myths. They consider it to be the home of Loo-errn, the spirit ancestor of the Brataualung clan. The area remains highly significant to the Gunaikurnai and Boon wurrung people, who consider the promontory to be their traditional country.

The first European to see the promontory was George Bass in January 1798. He initially referred to it as "Furneaux's Land" in his diary, believing it to be what Captain Furneaux had previously seen. But on returning to Port Jackson and consulting Matthew Flinders he was convinced that the location was so different it could not be that land.

Seal hunting was conducted in the area in the 19th century. Shore-based whaling was also carried out in a cove at Wilsons Promontory from at least 1837. It was still underway in 1843 at Lady's Bay (Refuge Cove).

Throughout the 1880s and '90s, a public campaign to protect the area as a national park was waged, including by the Field Naturalists' Club of Victoria. The promontory has been a national park, to one degree or another, since 1898. Wilsons Promontory National Park, also known locally as "the Prom", contains the largest coastal wilderness area in Victoria. Until the 1930s, when the road was completed, it was accessible only by boat. The site was closed to the public during World War II, as it was used as a commando training ground. A memorial to commandos who lost their lives in World War II is located at Tidal River. The only settlement within Wilsons Promontory is Tidal River which lies 30 kilometres (19 mi) south of the park boundary and is the focus for tourism and recreation. This park is managed by Parks Victoria.

In 2005 a burn started by staff got out of control and burnt 13% of the park, causing the evacuation of campers. In 2009, a lightning strike near Sealer's Cove started a fire that burned over 25,000 hectares (62,000 acres). Much of the area had not been burned since 1951. The fire began on 8 February, the day after "Black Saturday", during which an intense heat wave, combined with arson, faulty electrical infrastructure, and natural causes, led to hundreds of bushfires throughout the state of Victoria. Despite the damage, the natural beauty of the area remained largely intact.

=== Name ===
The promontory is also known as "Yiruk" or "Wamoon" by some traditional owner groups. From the early 19th century, it has also been known as Wilsons Promontory, given the name by Governor Hunter on the recommendation of Matthew Flinders and George Bass:

"At our recommendation governor Hunter called it WILSON'S PROMONTORY, in compliment to my friend Thomas Wilson, Esq. of London."

Despite Wilson being significant enough for such a large amount of land to be named in his honour, he had slipped into obscurity until 2023, when new research was published by the Royal Australian Historical Society. Wilson was in fact one of the most important promoters of the study of the natural history of New South Wales, as all of eastern Australia was then known, in the late 18th and early 19th centuries. He was a member of both the Society for Promoting Natural History and the Linnean Society, a wealthy apothecary, a patron of surgeon and botanical collector John White and supporter of Flinders. White dedicated his far-reaching and substantial account of the First Fleet to Wilson, entitled Journal of a Voyage to New South Wales

== Geography and wildlife ==
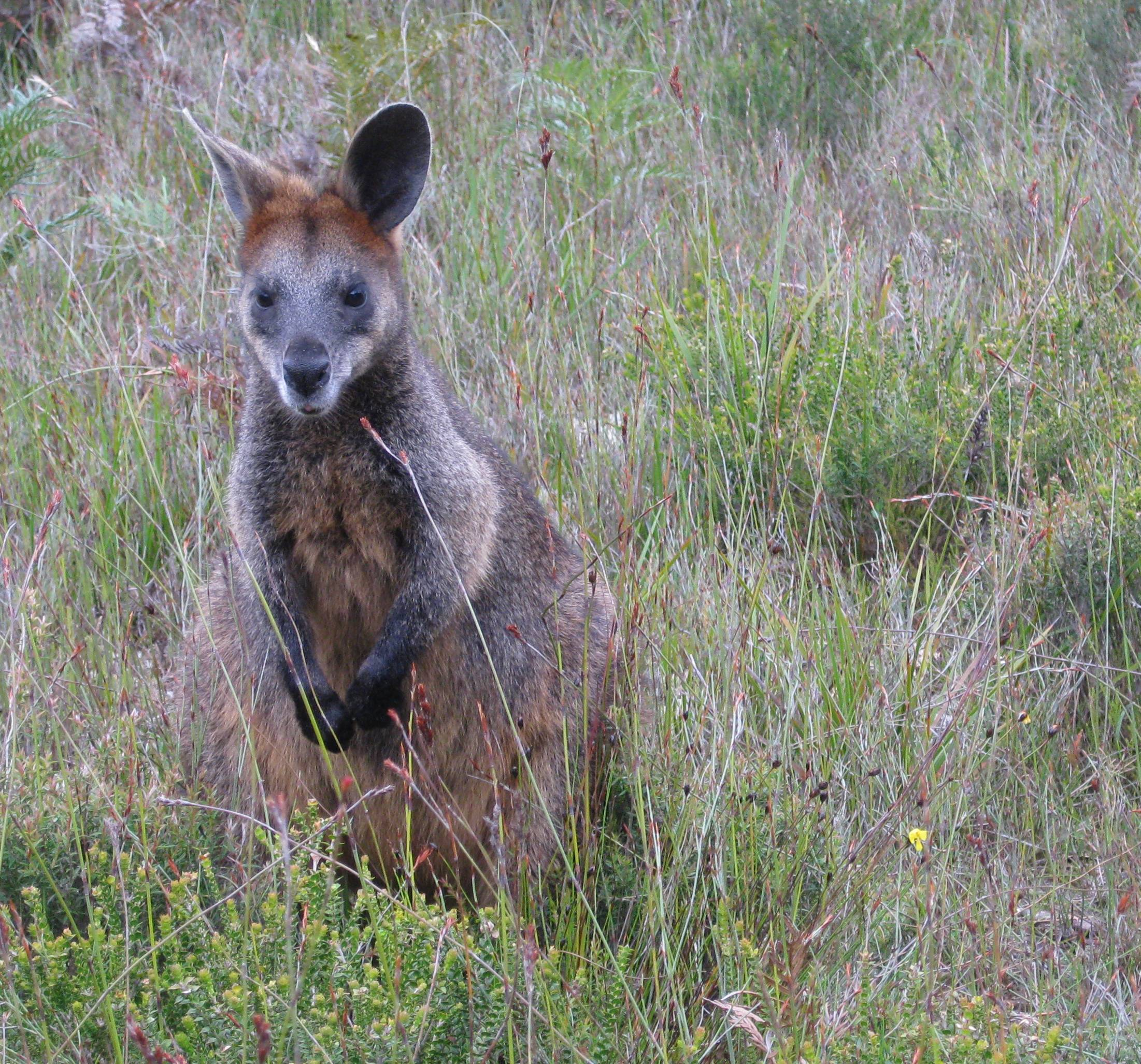
Swamp wallaby at Wilsons Promontory

Coastal features include expansive intertidal mudflats, sandy beaches and sheltered coves interrupted by prominent headlands and plunging granite cliffs in the south, backed by coastal dunes and swamps. The promontory is surrounded by a scatter of small granite islands which, collectively, form the Wilsons Promontory Islands Important Bird Area, identified as such by BirdLife International because of its importance for breeding seabirds.

Tidal River is the main river in Wilsons Promontory. The river runs into Norman Bay and swells with the tide. The river is a very fascinating colour, a purple-yellow. This is due to the large number of tea trees in the location, which stain the water with tannin, giving it a tea-like appearance. Darby River is the second major river, with extensive alluvial flats and meanders. It was the site of the original park entrance and accommodation area from 1909 to the Second World War.

Wilsons Promontory is home to many marsupials, native birds and other creatures. One of the most common marsupials found on the promontory is the common wombat, which can be found in much of the park (especially around campsites where it has been known to invade tents searching for food). The peninsula is also home to kangaroos, snakes, wallabies, koalas, long-nosed potoroos, white-footed dunnarts, broad-toothed rats, feather-tailed gliders and emus. Some of the most common birds found on the promontory include crimson rosellas, yellow-tailed black cockatoos and superb fairywrens. There are also many pests, including hog deer, foxes, feral cats, rabbits, common starlings, and common blackbirds.

As the Wilsons Promontory Marine National Park and Corner Inlet Marine National Park have been established, the area holds a variety of marine life and coral reefs. In recent years, after a long disappearance, due to illegal hunting by the Soviet Union with help by Japan, Southern right whales started to return to the area to rest and calve in the sheltered bays along with Humpback whales. Killer whales are also known to pass the area, and dolphins, seals, sea lions, and penguins still occur today.

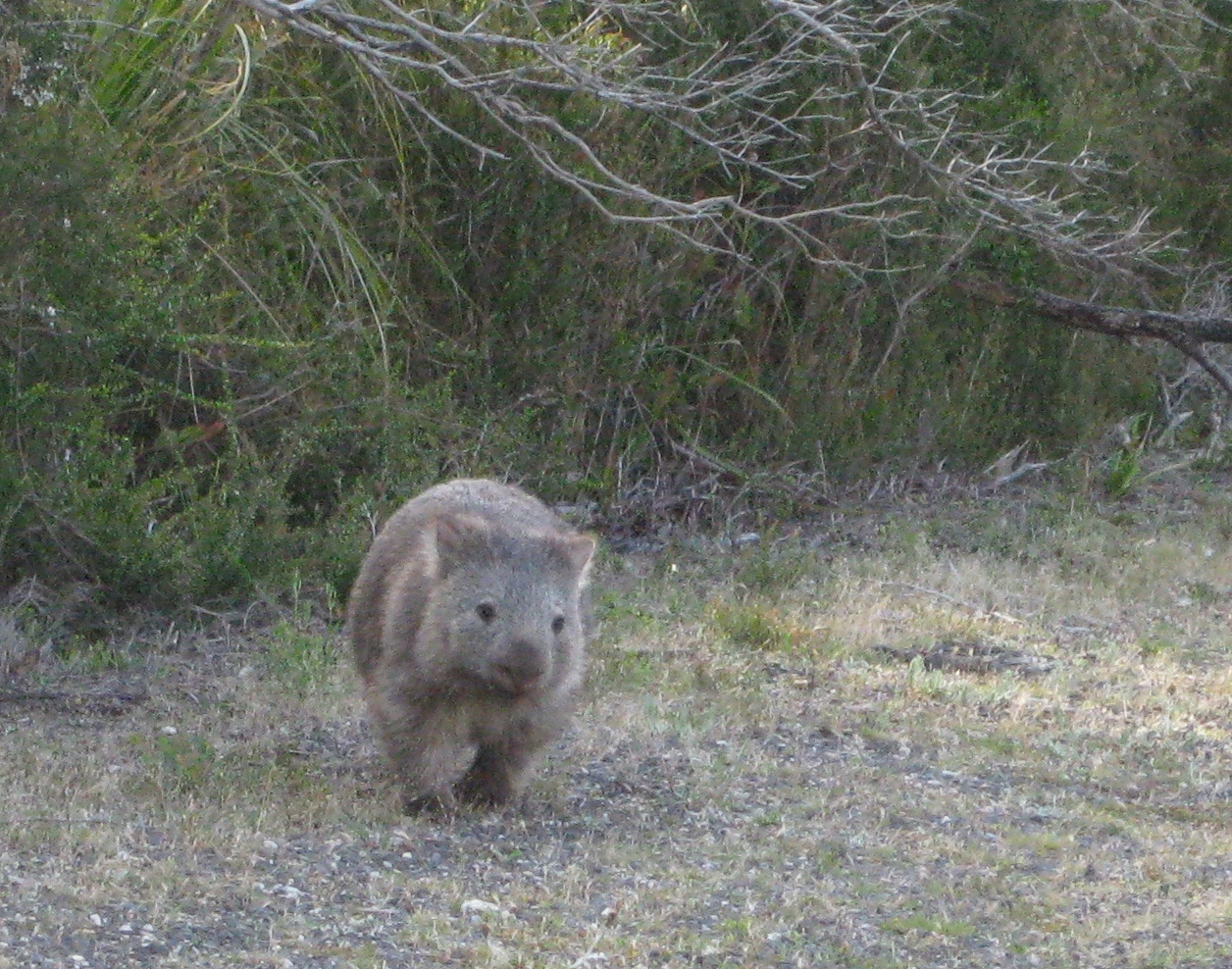
Common wombat at Wilsons Promontory National Park

In Wilsons Promontory National Park, the wildlife around the Tidal River campground in the main park is accustomed to human presence, and many of the animals and birds near the campsites will approach humans, accept food from them, or even enter their tents uninvited. It is, however, illegal to feed wildlife in the park and if one is found to be feeding them you will be issued with a fine by Parks Victoria staff.

Outside the camping area, the wildlife is less accustomed to humans, and may be more difficult to spot. In the park, possums can be quite easily found with a torch at night, and kangaroos and emus are often seen in large numbers on either side of the road on the way in to the National Park. Swamp wallabies are frequently spotted on many of the walks, as are a variety of bird species. The northern section of the park is also home to an abundance of snakes.

The peninsula is also home to two large sets of dunes, the Big Drift and Little Drift. They are not very well-known but sometimes visited by hikers and suitable for sandboarding.

== National Park ==
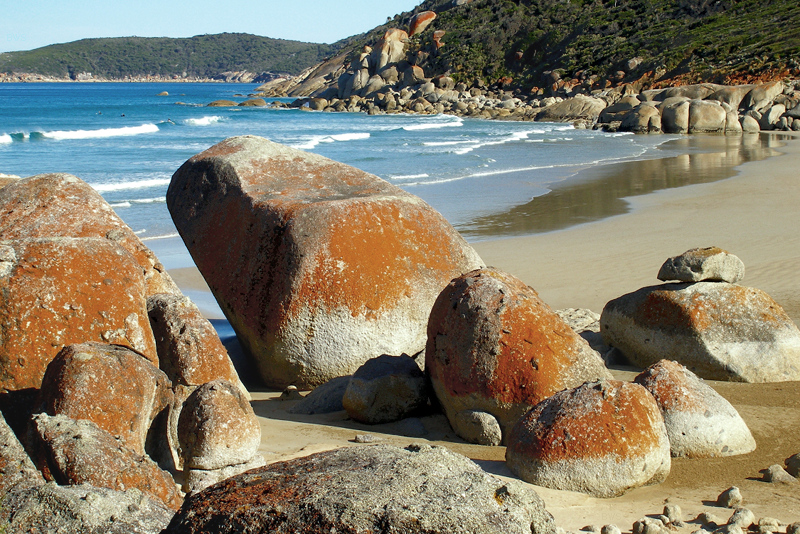
Colourful rocks within the national park.

The Wilsons Promontory National Park covers the southern portion of the peninsula, containing South Point, South East Point, and a number of islands.

The 50,500-hectare (125,000-acre) national park is the southernmost national park on mainland Australia, known for its rainforests, beaches and abundant wildlife. The aforementioned lighthouse located on South East Point is the southernmost lighthouse on mainland Australia and has operated continuously since 1859.

The Park is highly popular with bushwalkers and campers, and has a number of lodges and serviced camping near the mouth of Tidal River as well as a number of hike-in camping areas catering for bushwalkers.

=== History ===
Lobbying by the Field Naturalists Club of Victoria (FNCV) and the Royal Society of Victoria (including Arthur Henry Shakespeare Lucas) led to the Victoria State Government temporarily reserving the area as National Park in 1898, made permanent in 1908. The original settlement in the Park was on the Darby River site, where a chalet existed. The FNCV has maintained a watching brief over the promontory for over 120 years.

A large section of the park was burnt out in April 2005 by a bushfire caused by a controlled burn that breached containment lines because of warmer and windier conditions than were forecast for that day, causing the evacuation of six-hundred people.

Although the 2009 fire burned to within 1 kilometre (0.62 mi), the Tidal River camping area and park headquarters were unaffected. The park reopened to the public one month after the incident and the burned areas quickly regrew.

In March 2011 a significant rainfall event led to major flooding of the Tidal River camping area. The bridge over Darby River was cut, leaving no vehicle access to Tidal River, leading to the evacuation of all visitors by helicopter over the following days, and the closure of the southern section of the park. In September 2011 public access to Tidal River was reopened following repair of the main access road, and the bridge at Darby River. All sections of the park south of Tidal River were closed while further repairs of tracks and footpaths were undertaken. The park was fully re-opened by Easter of 2012.

=== Camping ===
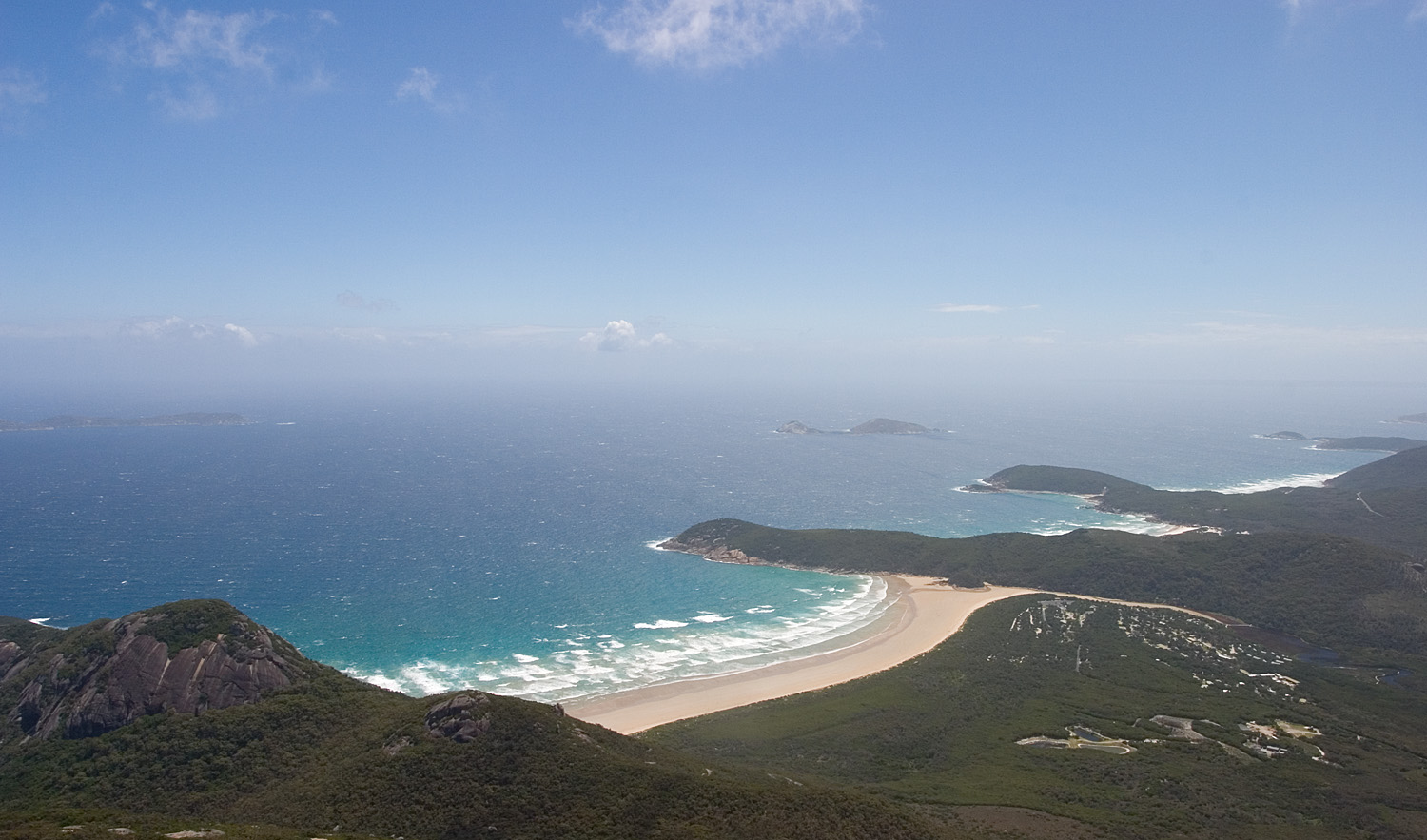
Tidal River as viewed from the summit of Mount Oberon, 2004

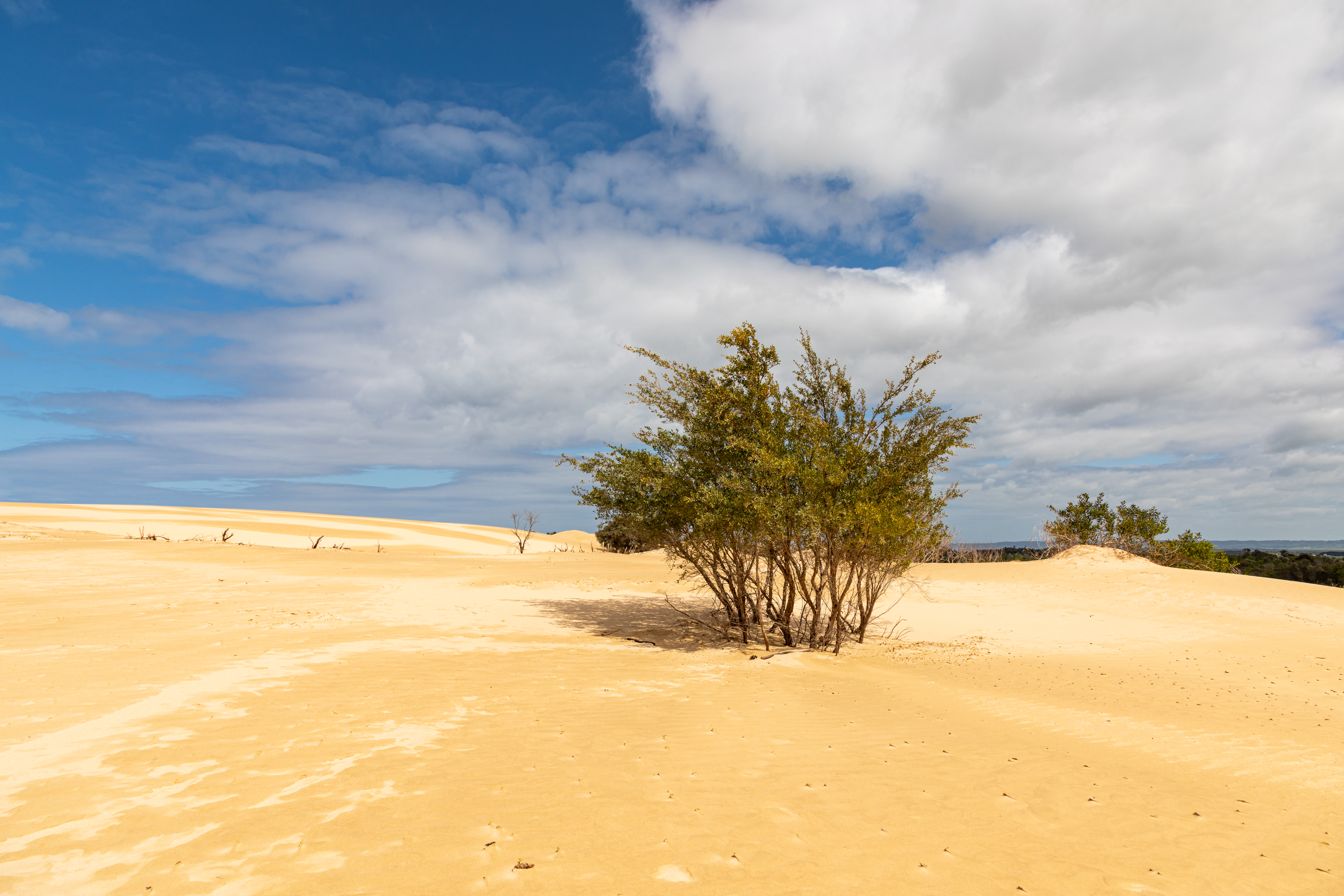
A sand dune along the "Big Drift" trail, 2019

Tidal River is the main location for accommodation and camping in Wilsons Promontory National Park. The only road open to visitors leads from Yanakie at the park entrance to Tidal River, a distance of 32 kilometres (20 mi).Tidal River Campground, situated in sand dunes behind Norman Bay, on the western side of the peninsula, has 484 camping and caravan sites (including twelve powered sites) situated near the beach and river. There are eleven remote walk-in sites located within the park. Parks Victoria also has glamping-style "Wilderness Retreats", family-sized cabins and group lodges available for hire. For those who wish to camp near Wilsons Promontory with their dog, Yanakie has a dog-friendly camping ground that can accommodate large caravans as well as smaller tents.

When fully occupied, the settlement of Tidal River swells to over 2,000 people. There is a visitor centre open daily, a general store which serves basic supermarket and emergency items, fish and chips and takeaway food. The outdoor cinema, established in the late 1940s, is a nostalgic favourite amongst summer campers who will sometimes line up for over an hour before tickets can be bought so they can save a seat in the front row with a blanket.

During summer, a ballot is held to allocate sites from Christmas until late January. Regardless of the time of year, all accommodation must be pre-booked.^{[3]}

=== Hiking ===
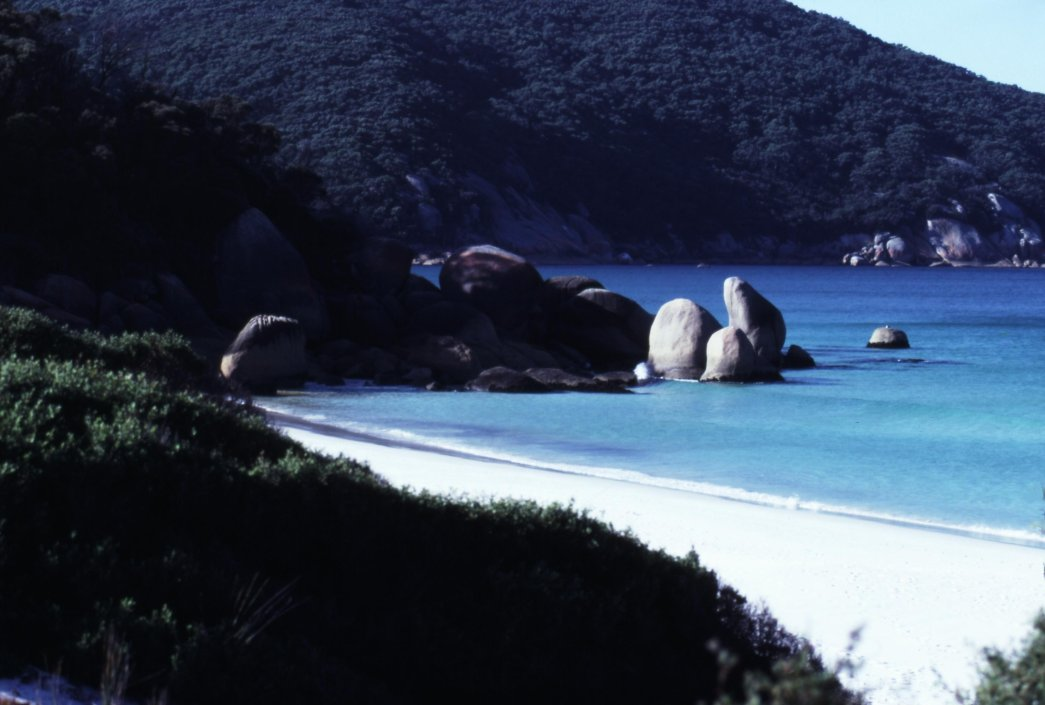
Waterloo beach, 2007

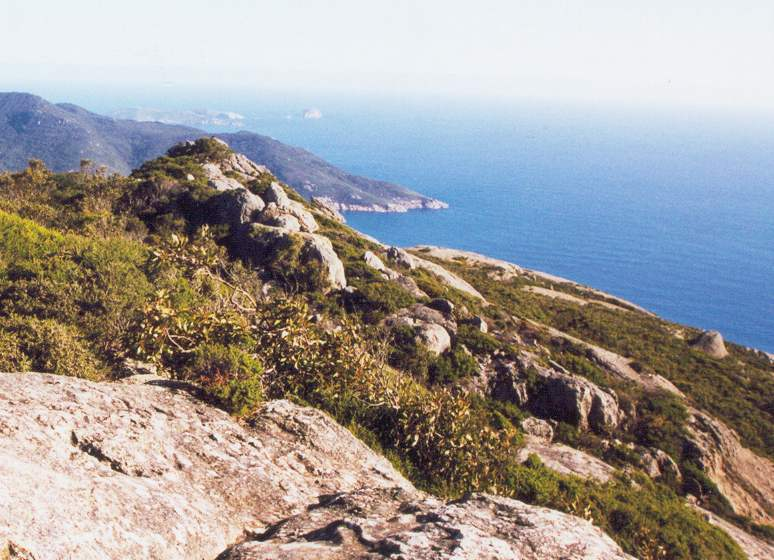
View from the top of Mount Oberon looking towards the southern tip, 2005

The park has a number of different hiking trails. There are trails of differing levels of difficulty, including day hikes ranging from short strolls using beach access ramps up to longer two- or three-hour walks. There are overnight hiking tracks with two key circuits, one in the north and one in the south. The southern circuit is more popular with overnight hikers with several camping areas suited to wild camping. Camping is only allowed in the designated areas to reduce damage to the bush. There are also multi-day hikes in the northern section of the park which require walkers to have good navigational skills. A permit is required for all overnight hiking.

A portion of the peninsula is warm temperate rainforest. Those areas are generally traversed on boardwalks and bridges, and the wildlife includes several bird species and swamp wallabies. There is also some mountainous terrain. Mount Oberon affords views that are only mildly marred by a radio aerial close by. An alternative walk-up Mount Bishop also has panoramic views of the Prom. The coastline is ruggedly and has indented coves and beaches interspersed amongst granite headlands, tors and cliffs. Beaches vary from broad sandy littoral plains to steep coves and rock pools. The northern part of the park comprises a great deal of the Yanakie Isthmus with sandy healthlands.

=== Mount Oberon ===
Mount Oberon, located in the park, is a popular hiking destination. Hikers generally start from Telegraph Saddle car park, around halfway up the mountain, from where they follow a management vehicle track to the summit, with views over Tidal River, the coast and offshore islands. It can be windy, cool and cloudy at the summit, even during summer. As of mid 2023, options for constructing a walking track linking Tidal River to Telegraph Saddle were being considered, to create a hiking opportunity to the summit from sea level.

=== In popular culture ===
Australian indie game Big Walk, released in 2026, is set in a loose 1:20 recreation of Wilsons Promontory. The game's developers also recorded ambient sounds on-location at the park.

== Climate ==
Wilsons Promontory has an Oceanic climate (Cfb) heavily influenced by the Roaring Forties, bringing summer temperatures far below what is the norm on mainland Australia at sea level. Winters and springs are dominated by low-pressure systems and high rainfall.

Climate data for Wilsons Promontory Lighthouse (39.13° S, 146.42° E)
Month	Jan	Feb	Mar	Apr	May	Jun	Jul	Aug	Sep	Oct	Nov	Dec	Year
Record high °C (°F)	41.4 (106.5)	42.0 (107.6)	38.1 (100.6)	32.2 (90.0)	25.7 (78.3)	22.2 (72.0)	22.0 (71.6)	24.4 (75.9)	30.0 (86.0)	33.9 (93.0)	38.0 (100.4)	40.2 (104.4)	42.0 (107.6)
Mean daily maximum °C (°F)	20.4 (68.7)	20.6 (69.1)	19.5 (67.1)	17.3 (63.1)	15.0 (59.0)	13.0 (55.4)	12.3 (54.1)	12.8 (55.0)	14.3 (57.7)	15.9 (60.6)	17.3 (63.1)	18.9 (66.0)	16.4 (61.5)
Mean daily minimum °C (°F)	14.2 (57.6)	14.9 (58.8)	14.3 (57.7)	12.8 (55.0)	11.1 (52.0)	9.4 (48.9)	8.4 (47.1)	8.4 (47.1)	9.1 (48.4)	10.1 (50.2)	11.3 (52.3)	12.7 (54.9)	11.4 (52.5)
Record low °C (°F)	5.6 (42.1)	7.2 (45.0)	5.4 (41.7)	3.3 (37.9)	3.3 (37.9)	−0.6 (30.9)	0.0 (32.0)	0.6 (33.1)	0.6 (33.1)	2.3 (36.1)	1.7 (35.1)	2.8 (37.0)	−0.6 (30.9)
Average precipitation mm (inches)	51.6 (2.03)	46.8 (1.84)	69.6 (2.74)	85.0 (3.35)	114.1 (4.49)	119.5 (4.70)	122.5 (4.82)	122.9 (4.84)	98.8 (3.89)	92.0 (3.62)	71.0 (2.80)	64.1 (2.52)	1,057.2 (41.62)
Average precipitation days	9.8	8.8	11.9	14.8	17.6	18.7	19.3	19.5	17.4	15.9	13.3	11.8	178.8
Source: The Bureau of Meteorology

== Gallery ==
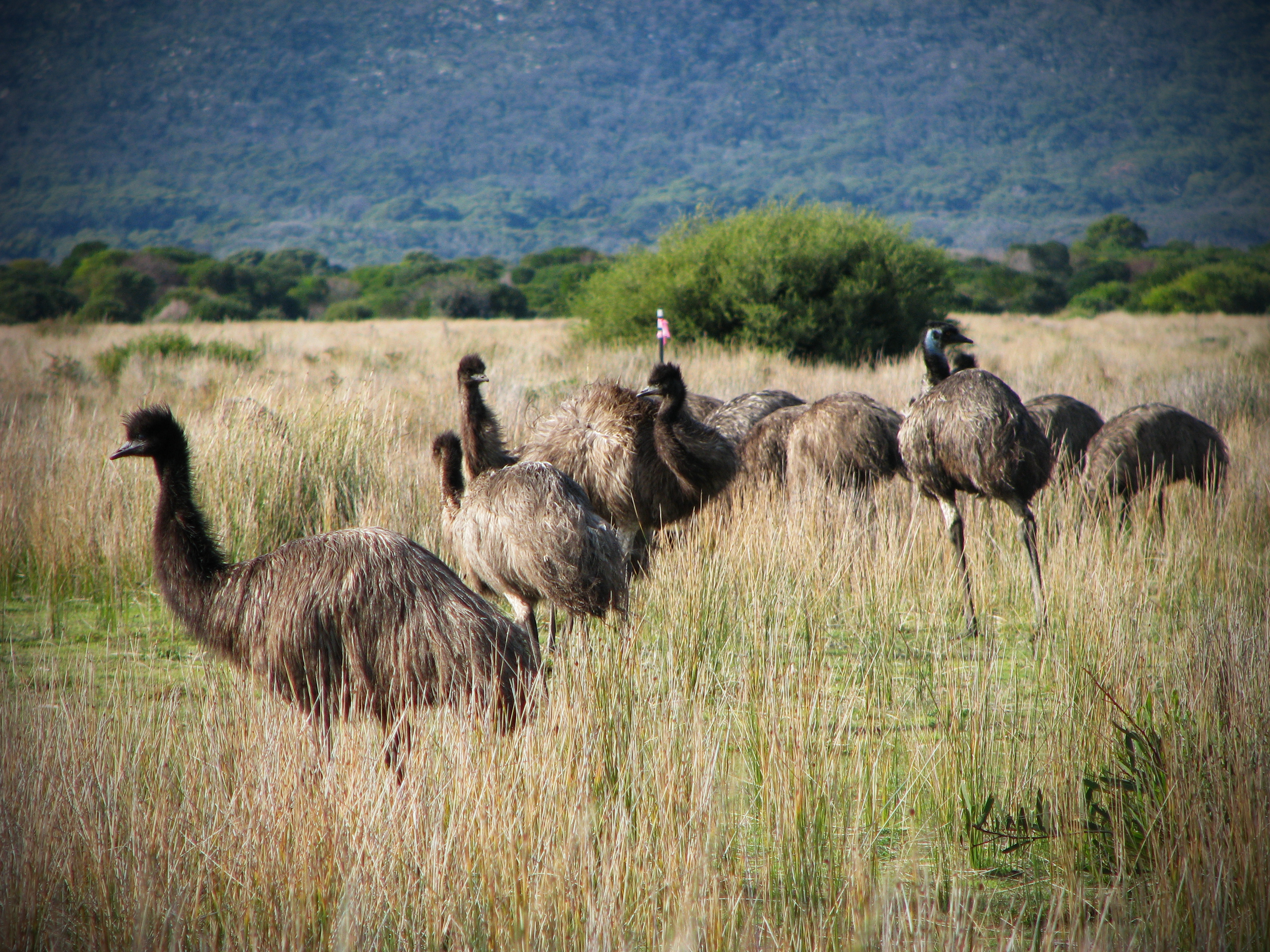
Emus

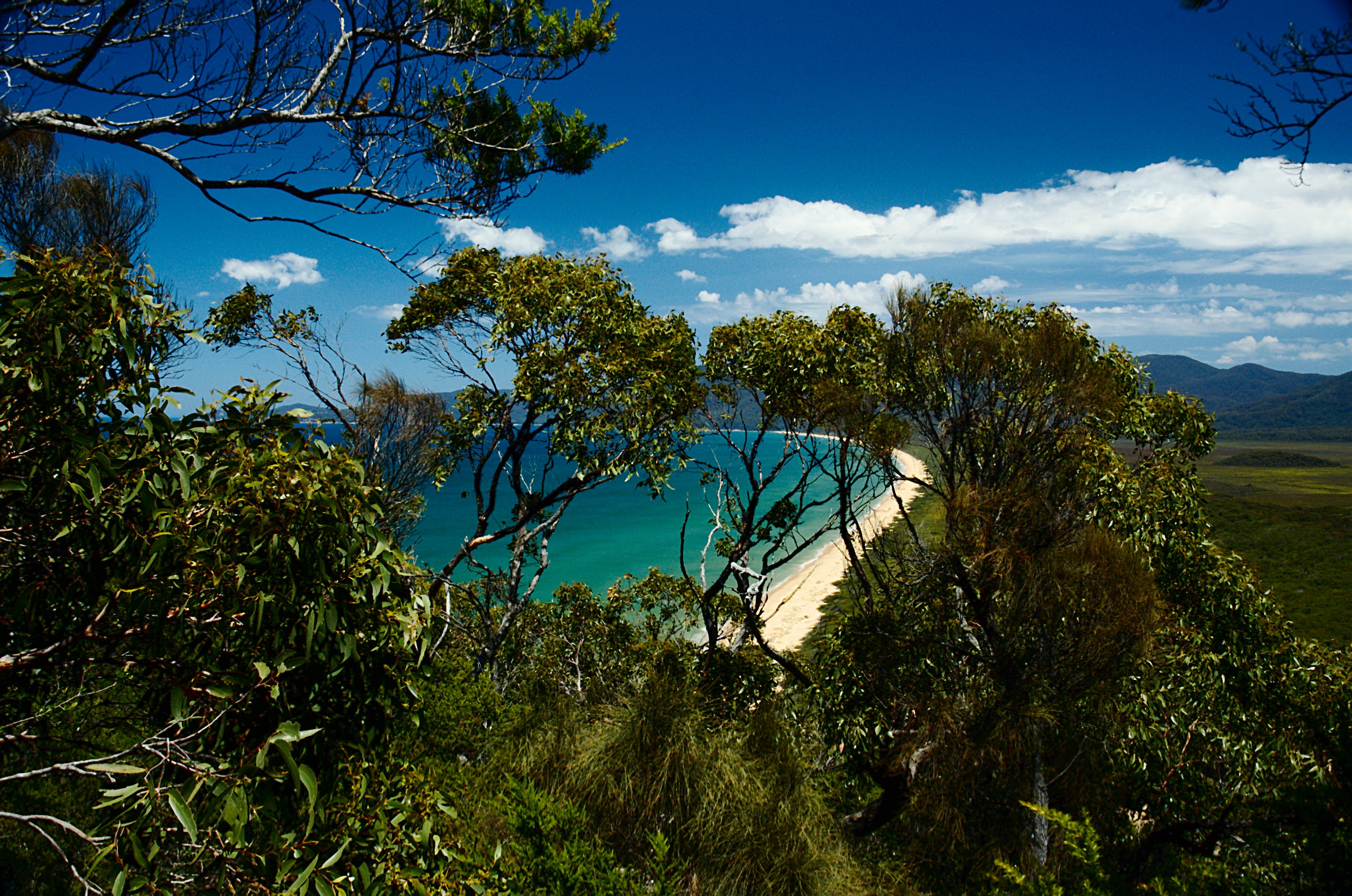
Five Mile Beach

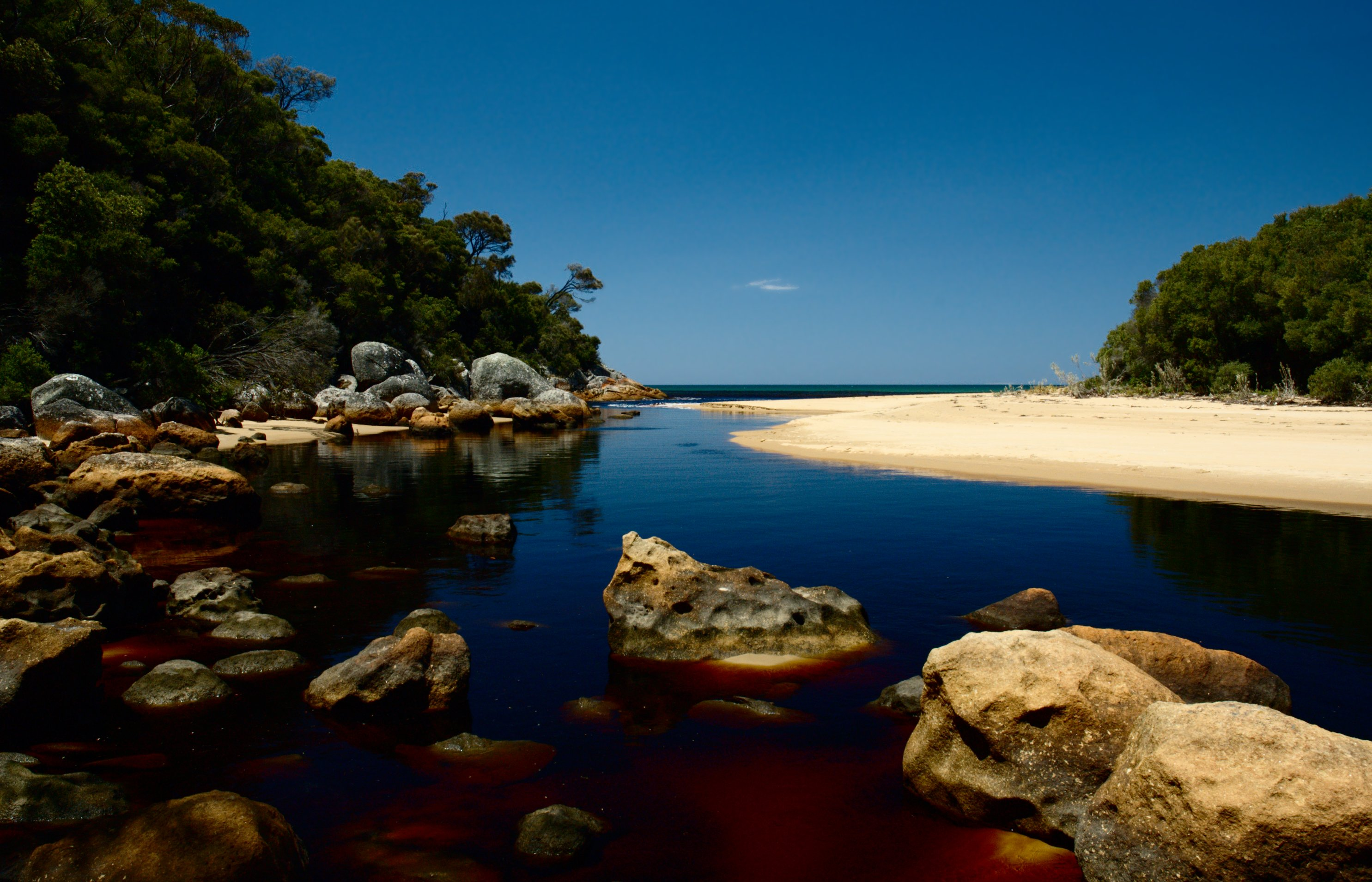
Five Mile Beach Camp

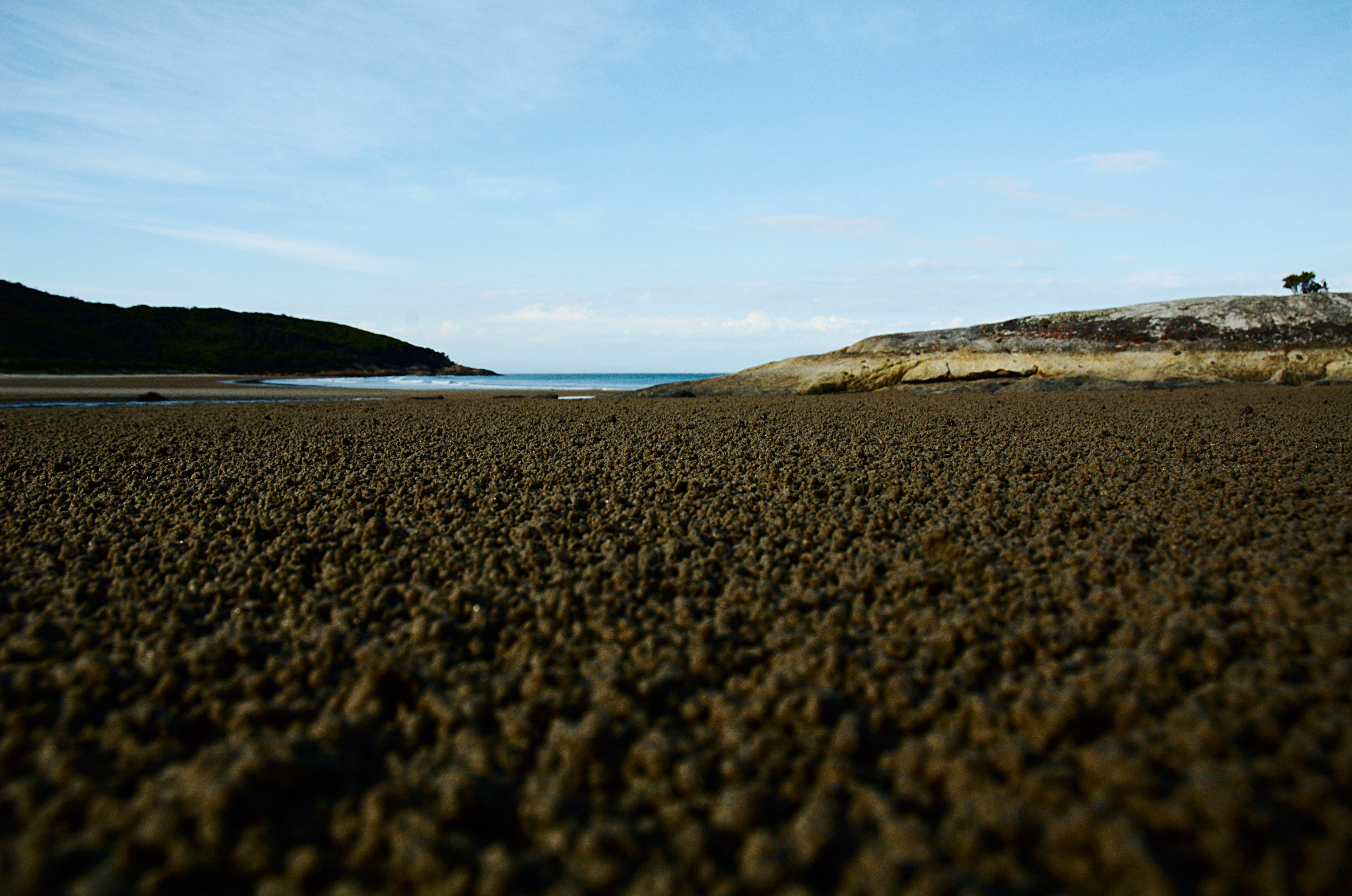
Beach near Johnny Souey Cove, home to many crabs.

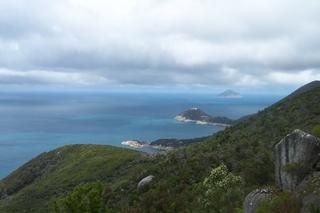
Southeast Point.

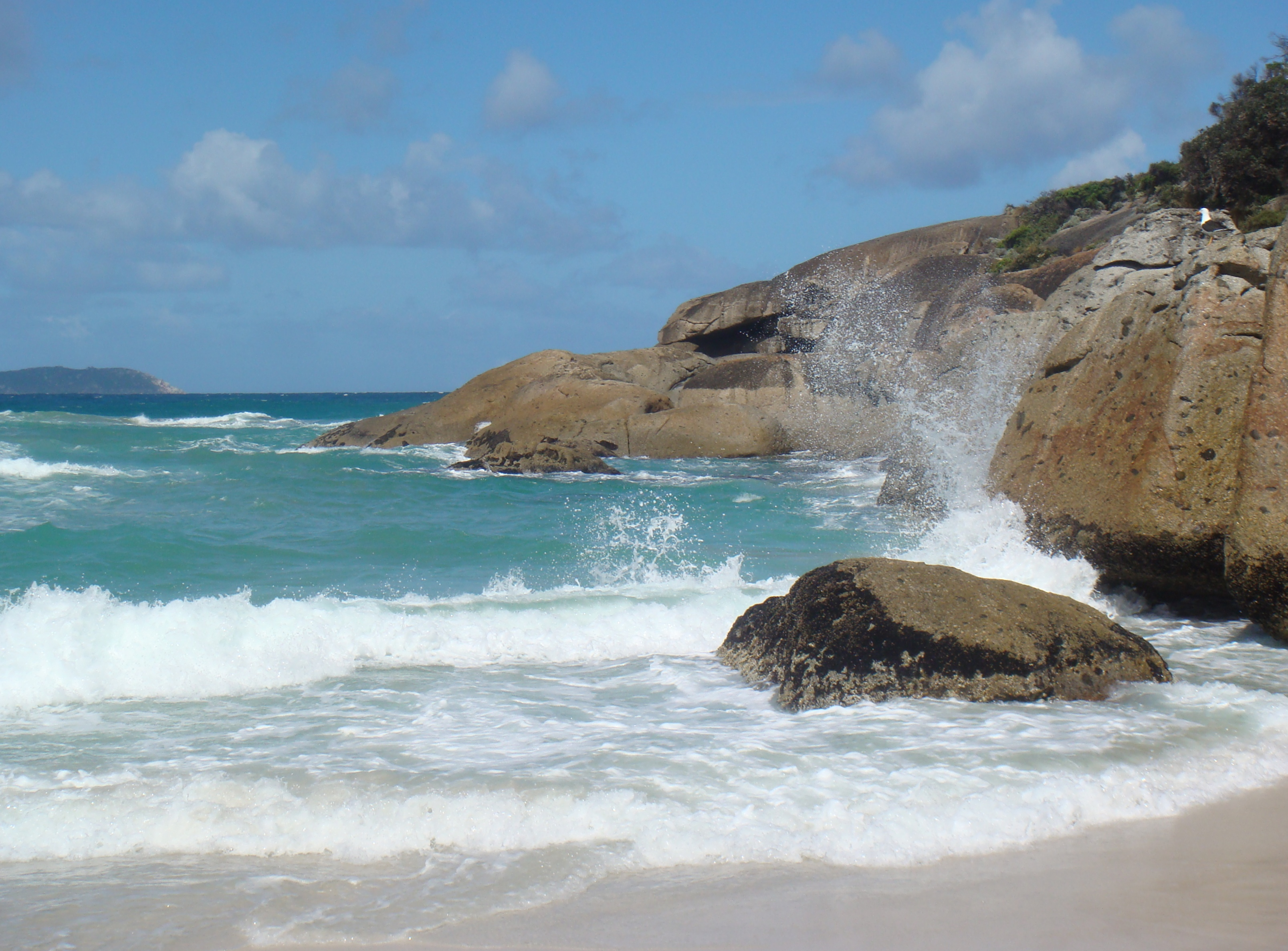
Squeaky Beach

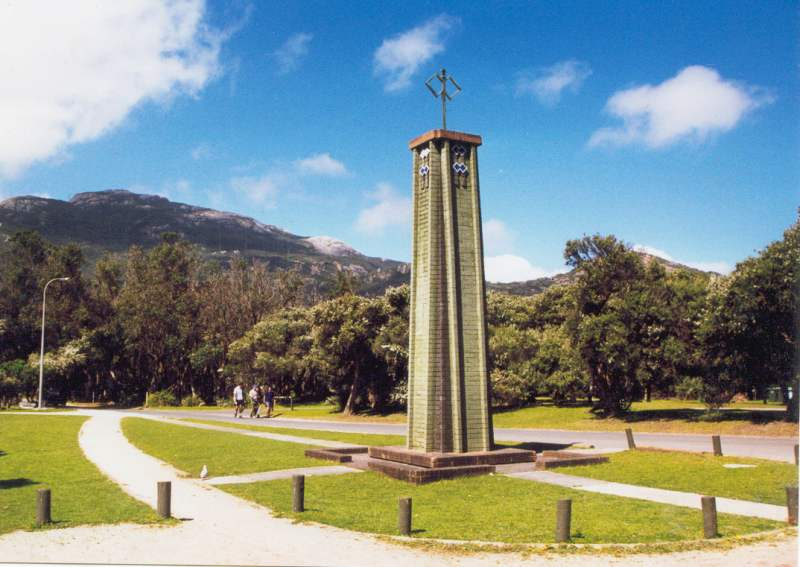
The Independent Companies Memorial at Tidal River

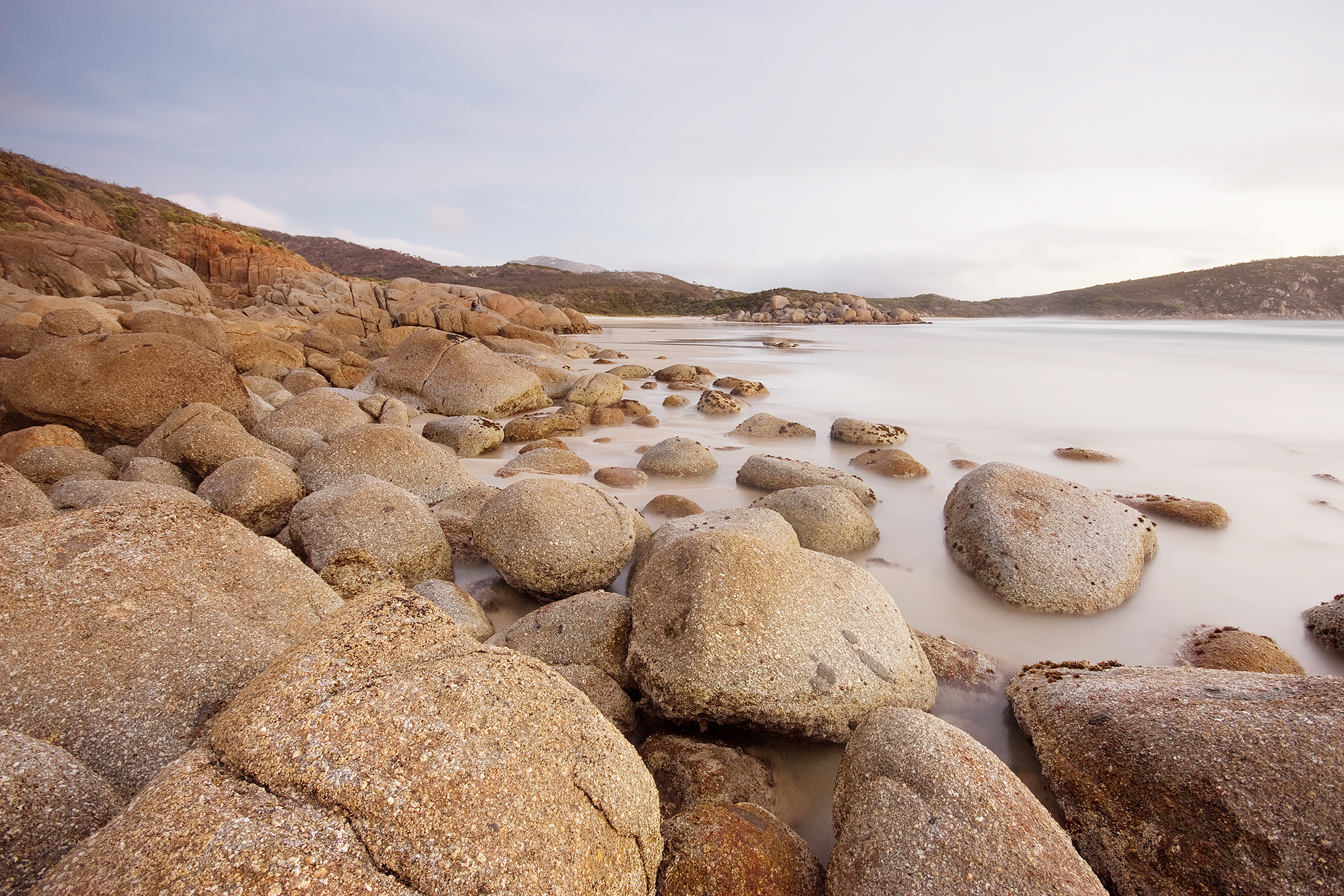
Whiskey Beach

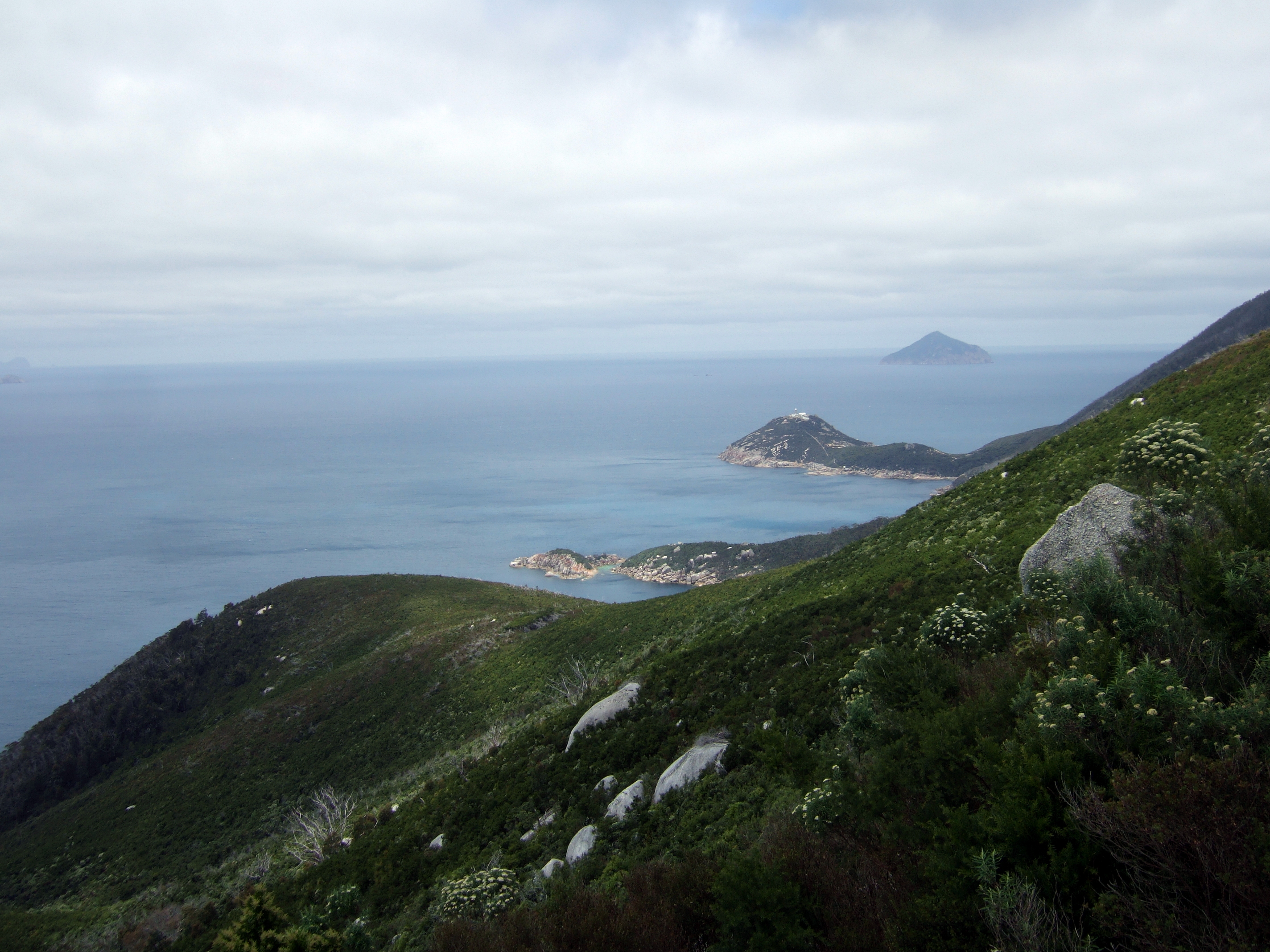
Southeast tip and lighthouse.

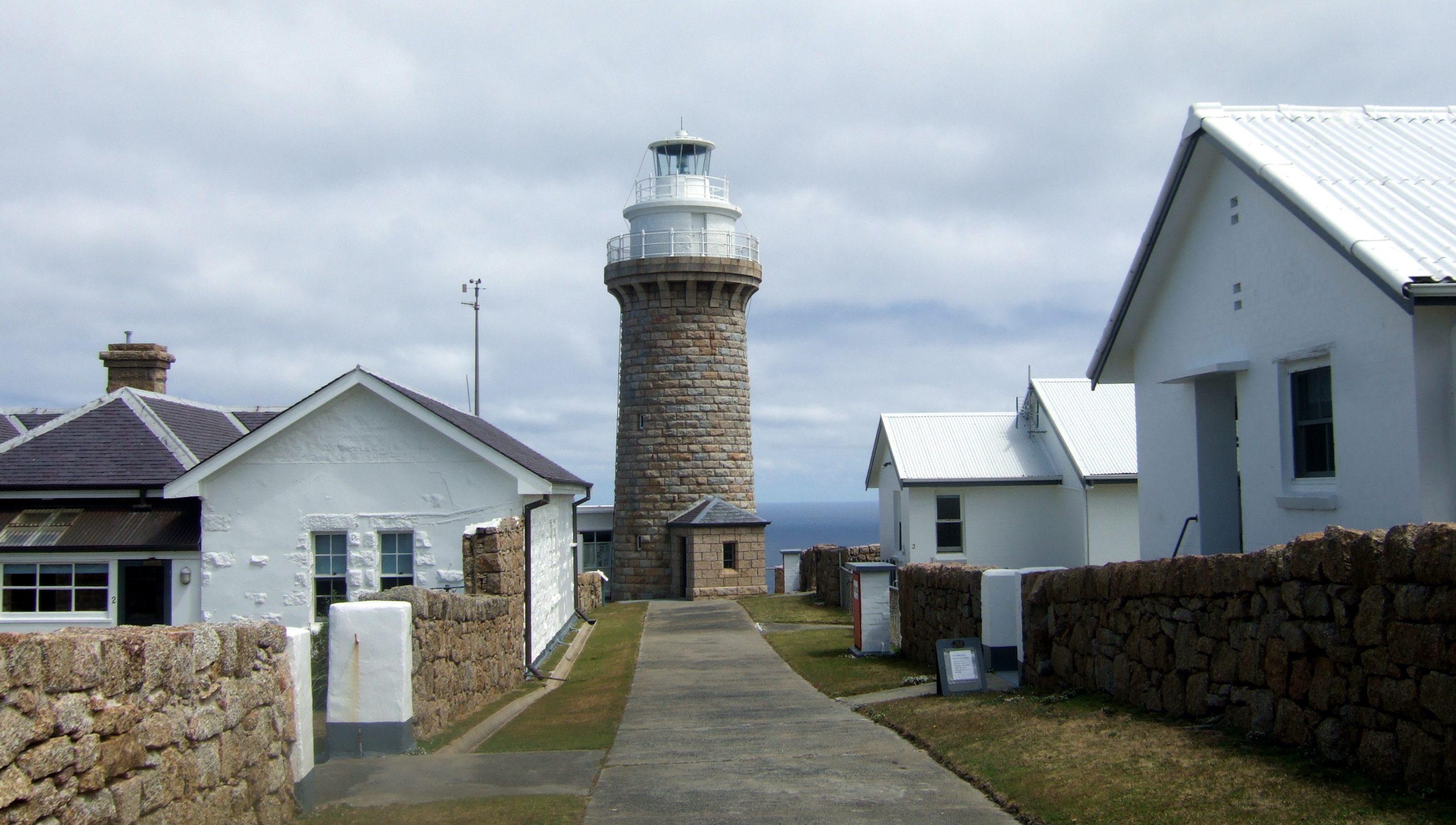
Lighthouse and cabin accommodation.

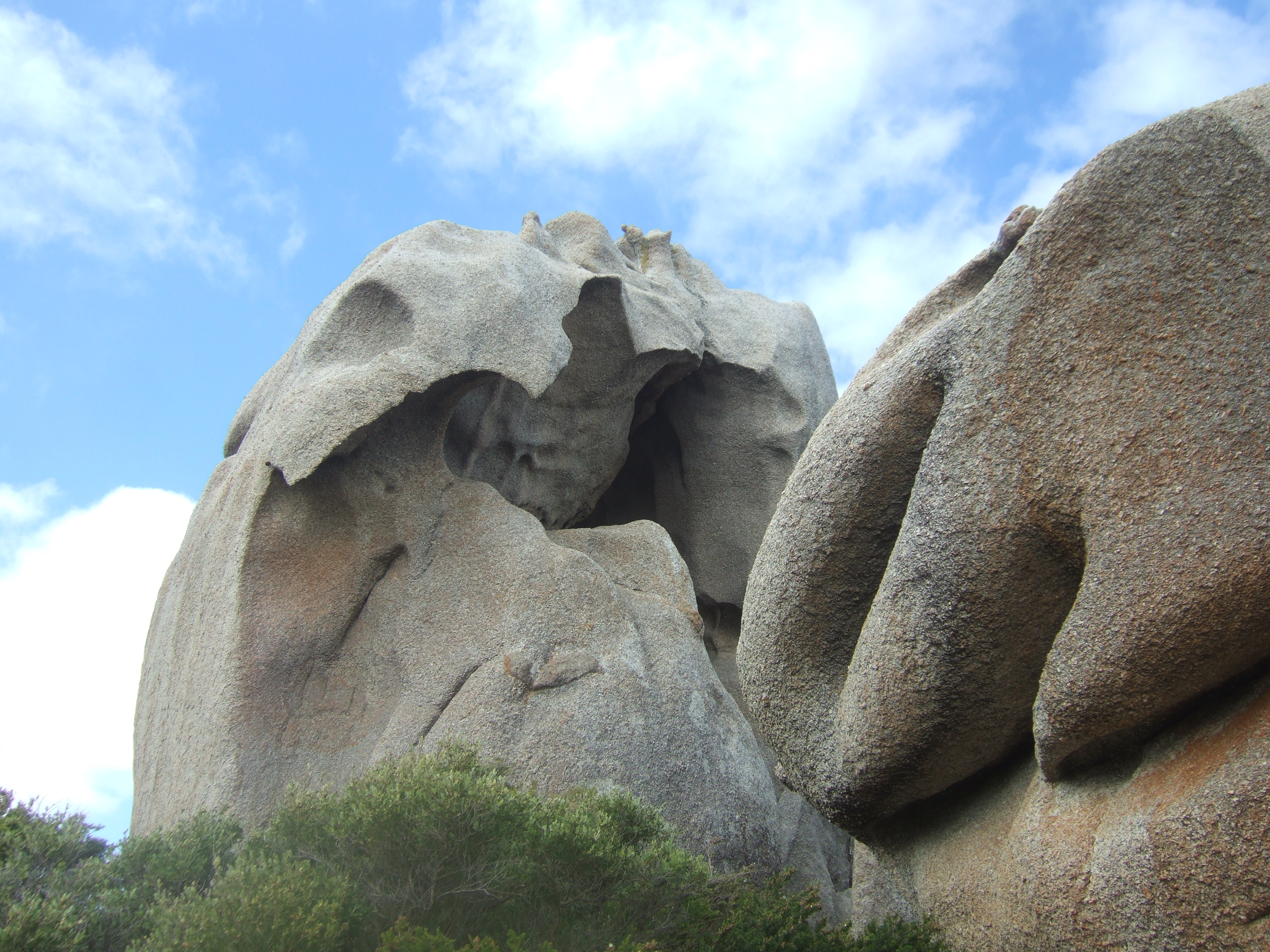
Granite rocks.

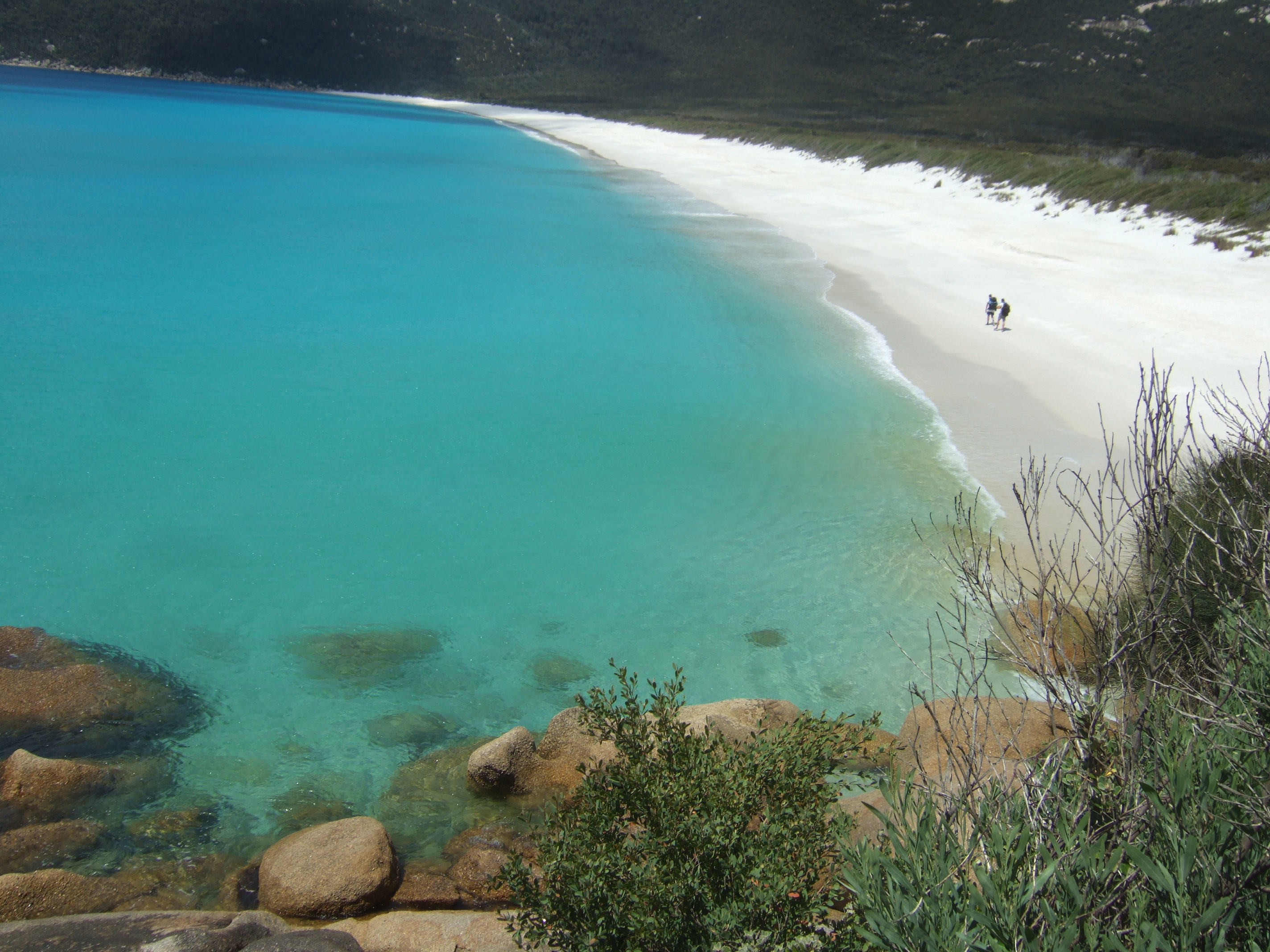
Waterloo Bay.

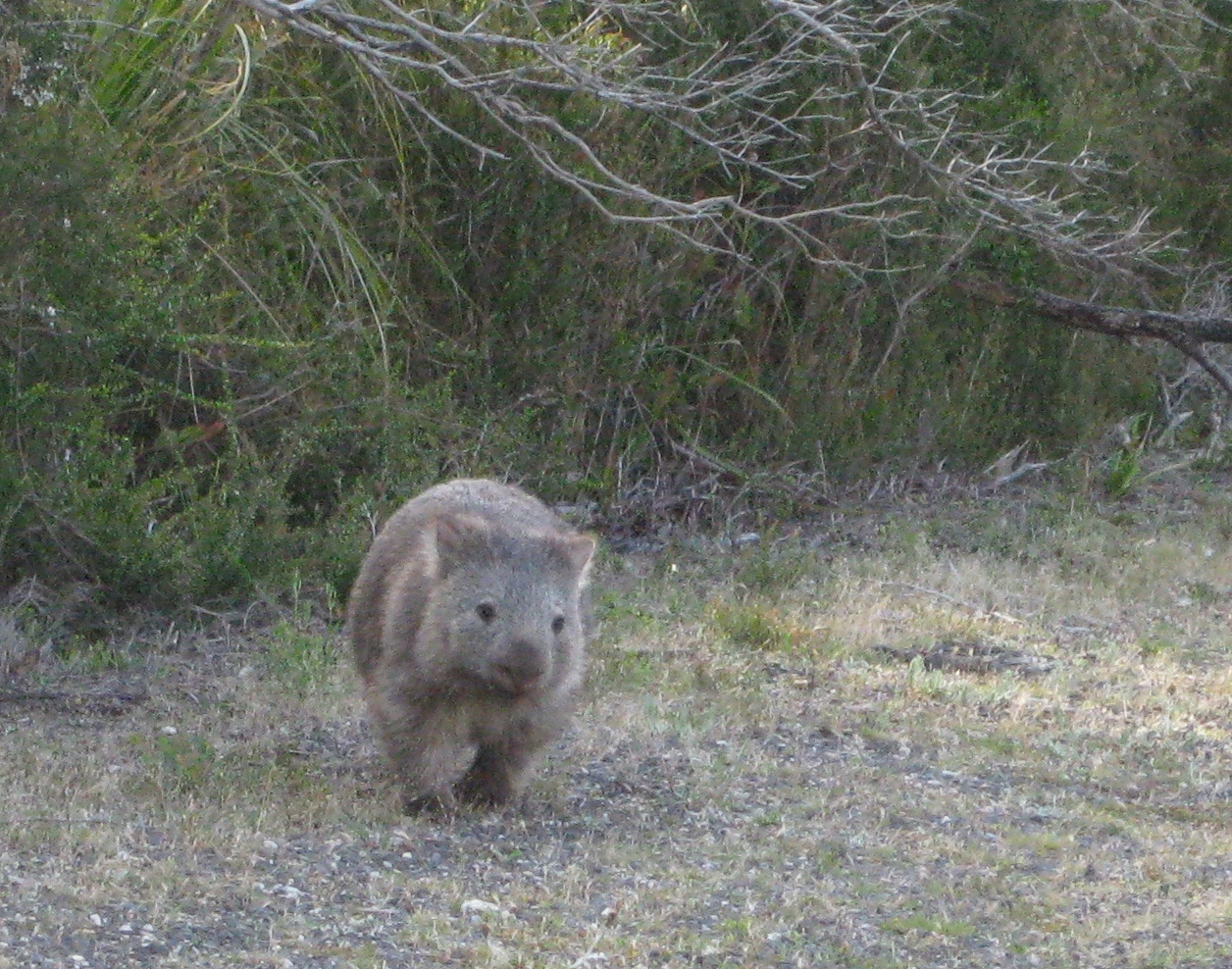
Wombat

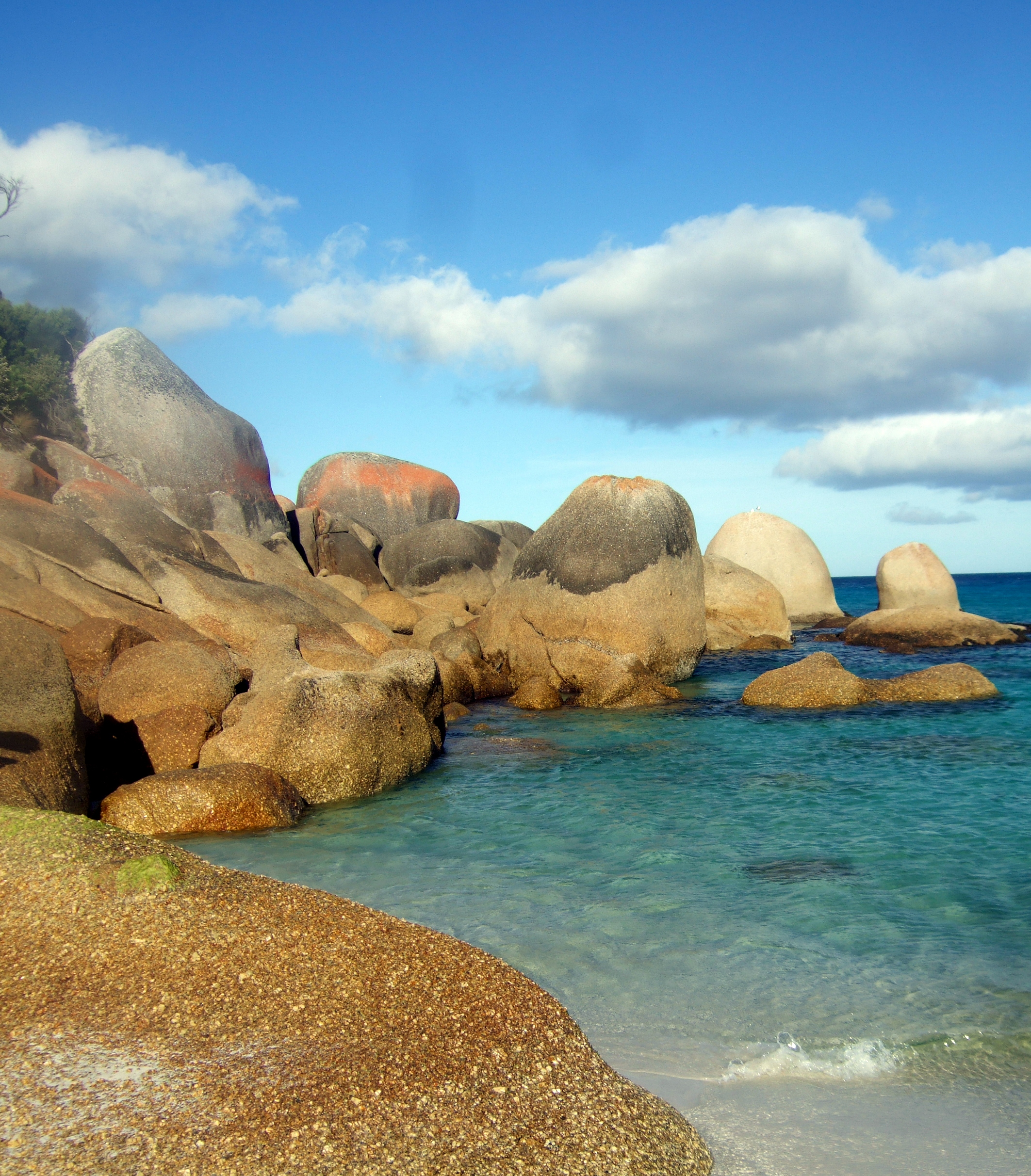
Rocks at Waterloo Bay.

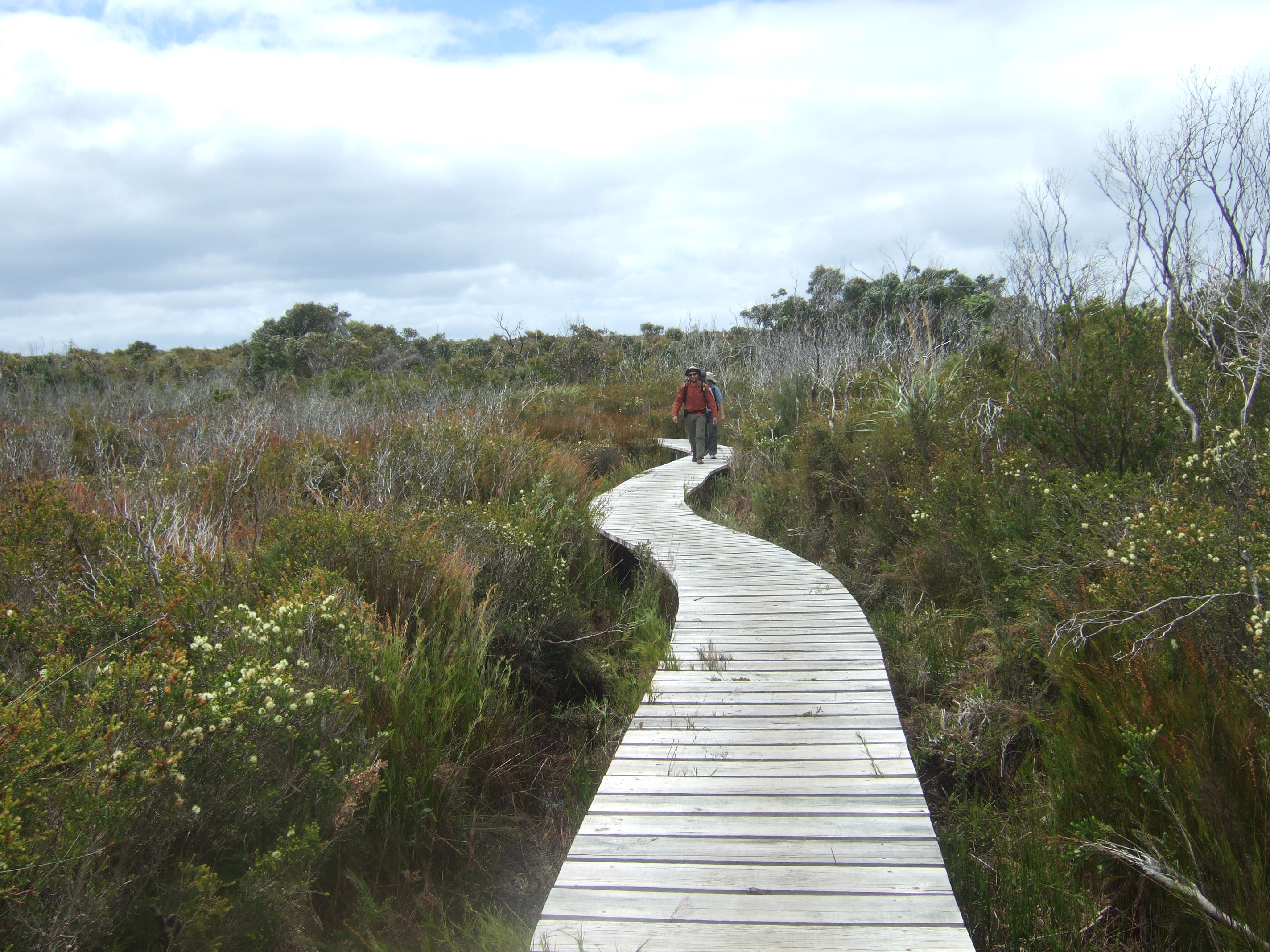
Hiking track to the southeast.

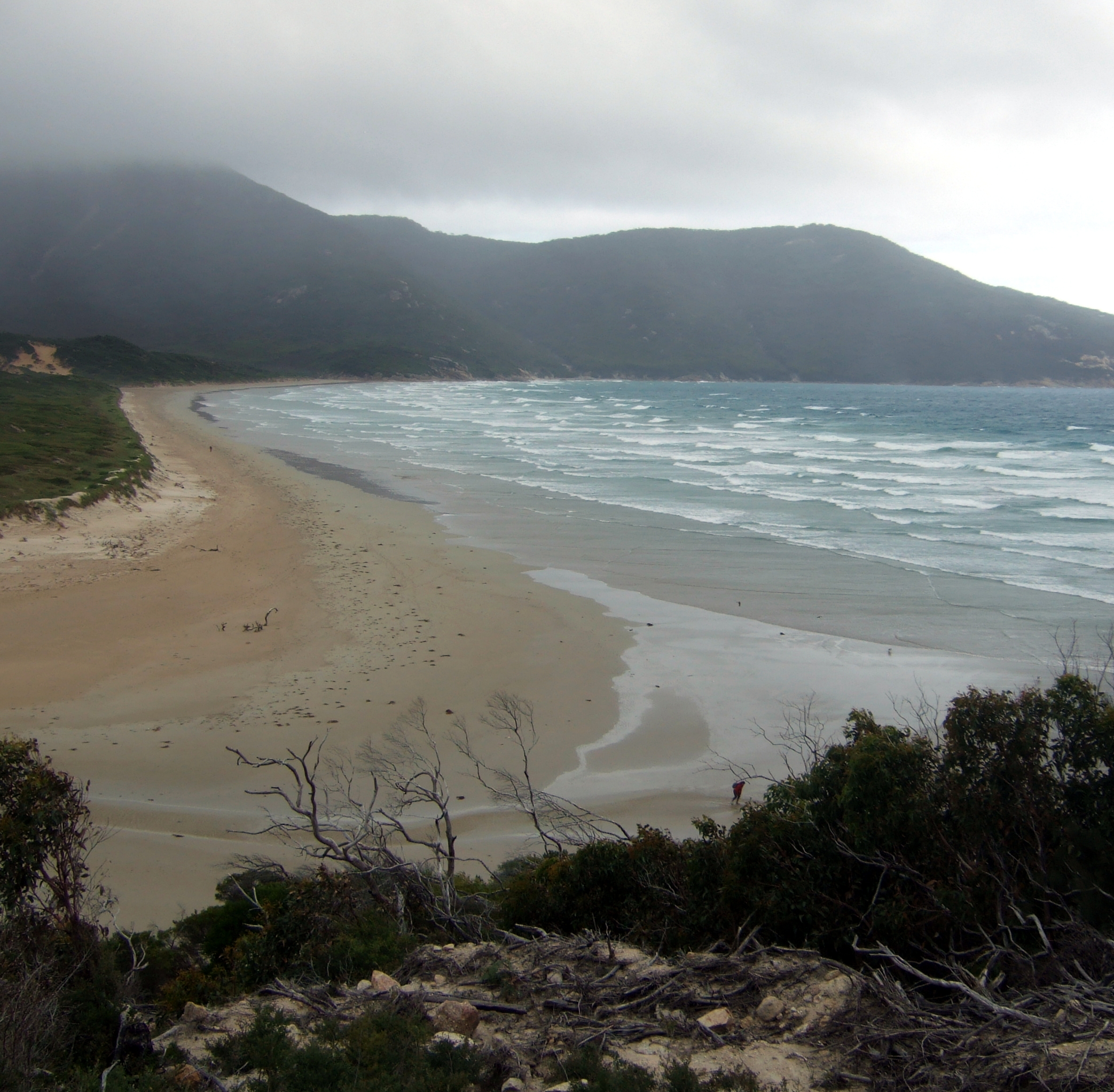
Oberon Beach.

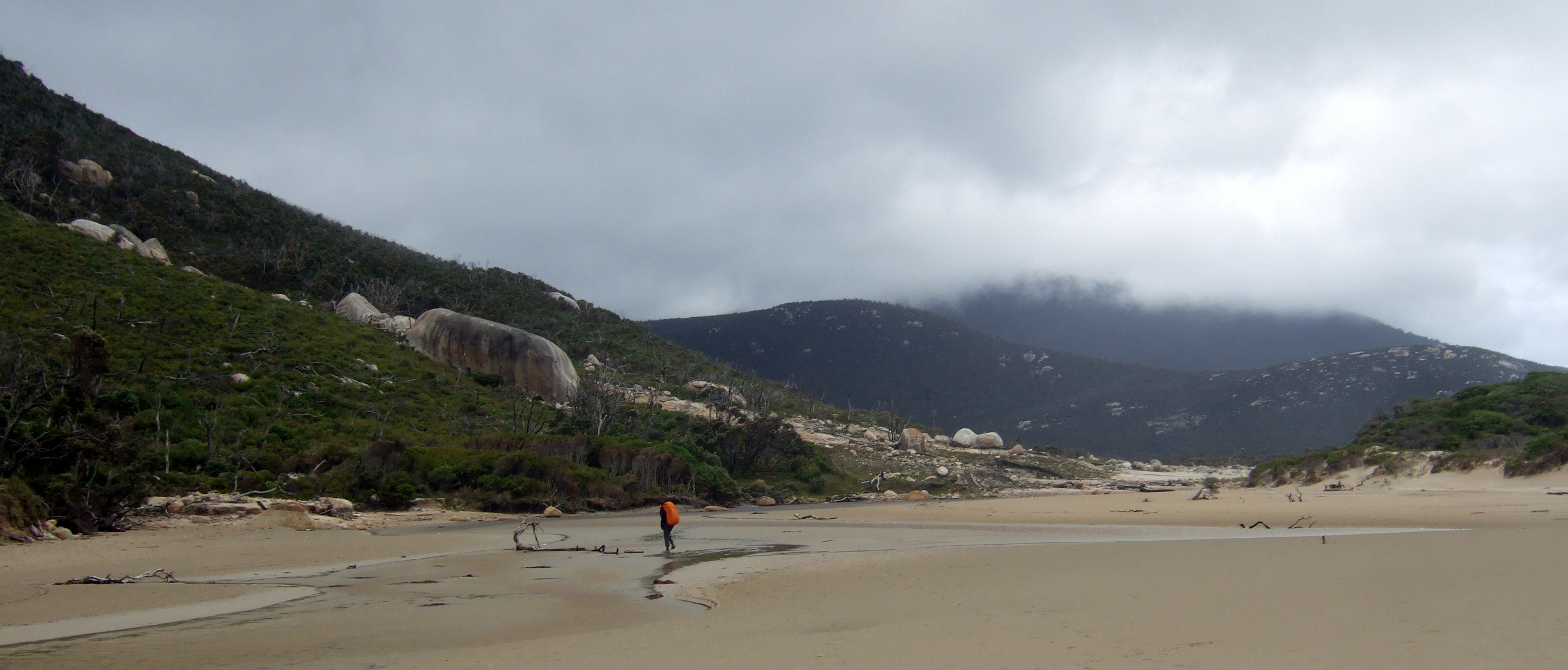
Mt Oberon, seen from Oberon Beach.

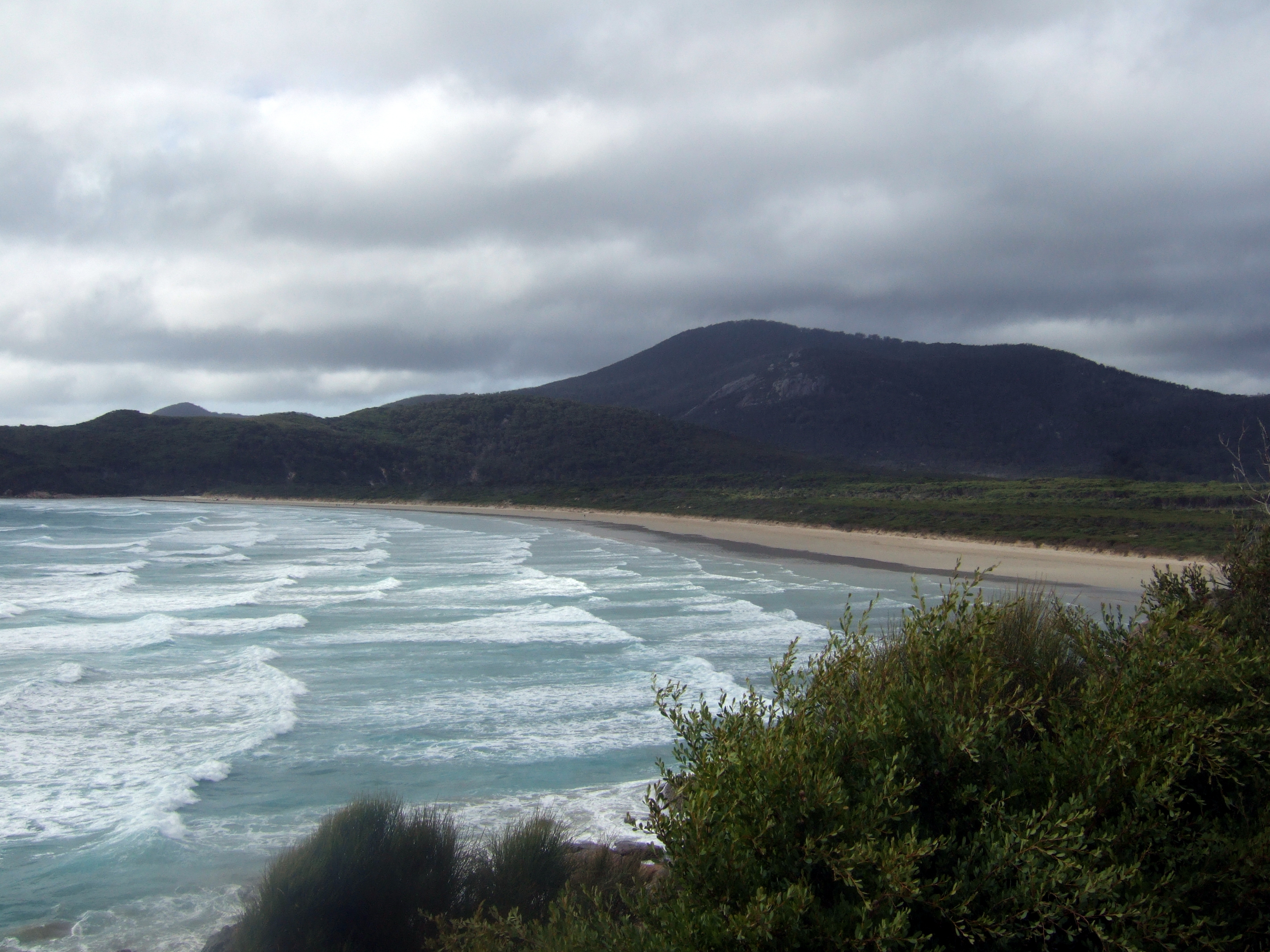
Norman Beach, near Tidal River.

== See also ==
- Protected areas of Victoria
- List of biosphere reserves in Australia
- List of national parks of Australia
