= Tidal River, Victoria =

Tidal River
- Town
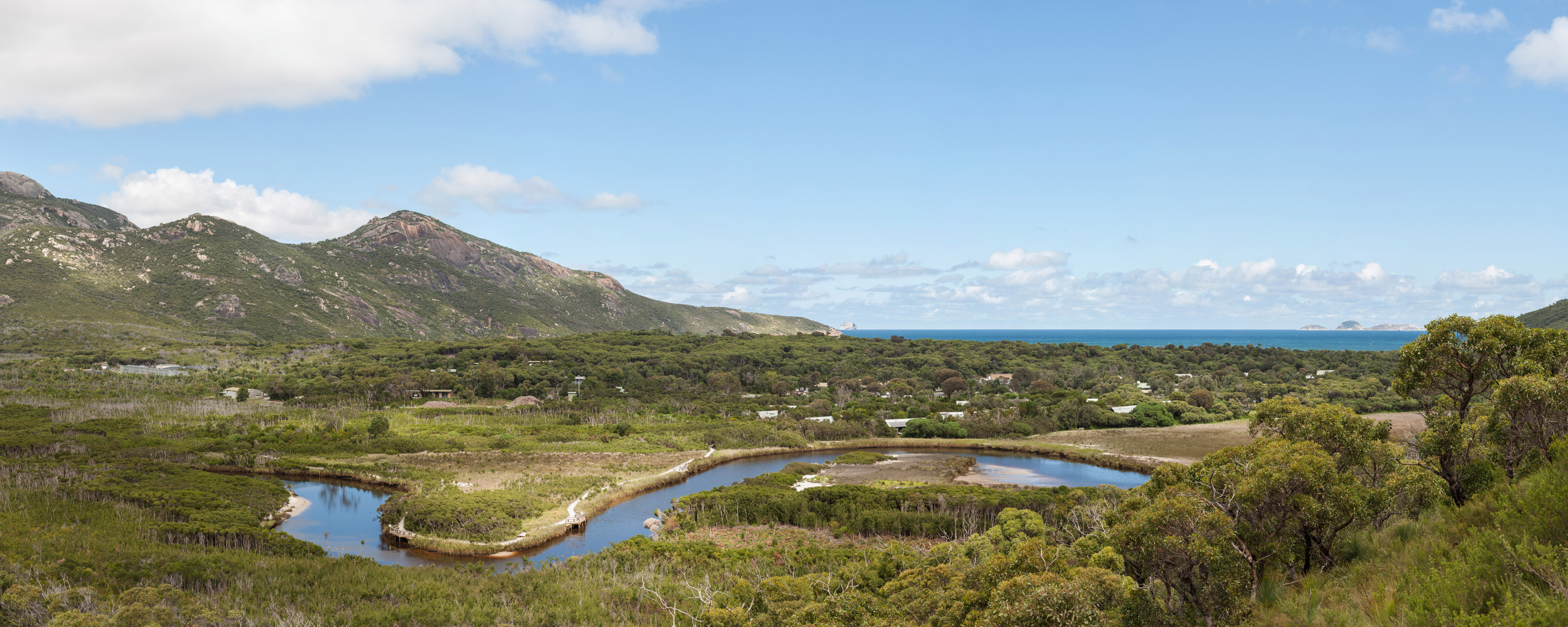
- Tidal River and the camp ground looking south

- Coordinates: 39°01′50″S 146°19′17″E
- Country: Australia
- State: Victoria
- LGA: South Gippsland Shire
- Location: 240 km (150 mi) SE of Melbourne; 59 km (37 mi) SE of Foster

Government
  - State electorate: Gippsland South
  - Federal division: Monash
- Elevation: 5 m (16 ft)
- Postcode: 3959

Tidal River is a locality in Wilsons Promontory National Park, Wilsons Promontory, Victoria, Australia. It contains the main park administration and service centres as well as a permanent camping ground that takes its name from the Tidal River, which flows past the camping ground to the north.

== History ==
Tidal River was originally established as an army commando training base during World War Two, operating from 1940 to 1942. At the end of the war, the previous National Park ranger station, chalet and camping area at Darby River was in such poor condition that it was not returned to use, but instead, remaining army buildings at Tidal River were adapted and reused for staff and visitor accommodation. In about 1950 the former Darby River ranger's cottage was relocated to Tidal River, leaving the Tidal River and Wilsons Promontory Lighthouse the only permanently inhabited parts of the park.

== The campground and facilities ==
Tidal River is the main location for accommodation and camping in Wilsons Promontory National Park. Tidal River Campground has 484 camping and caravan sites (including 20 powered sites) situated near the beach and river. There are also 11 remote walk-in sites located within the park.

Tidal River campground is nestled in sand dunes behind Norman Bay, on the western side of the peninsula. The only access road open to visitors leads from Yanakie at the park entrance to Tidal River, a distance of 32 km.

When fully occupied, the settlement of Tidal River swells to over 2,000 people. There is a visitor centre open daily, a general store with an extensive range of products, fish and chippery and café. The outdoor cinema, established in the late 1940s, is a nostalgic favourite amongst summer campers who will sometimes line up for over an hour before tickets can be bought so they can save a seat in the front row with a blanket. There is no service station or fuel available at the campsite.

During summer a ballot is held to allocate sites from Christmas until late January. Regardless of the time of year, all accommodation must be pre-booked.

== Gallery ==
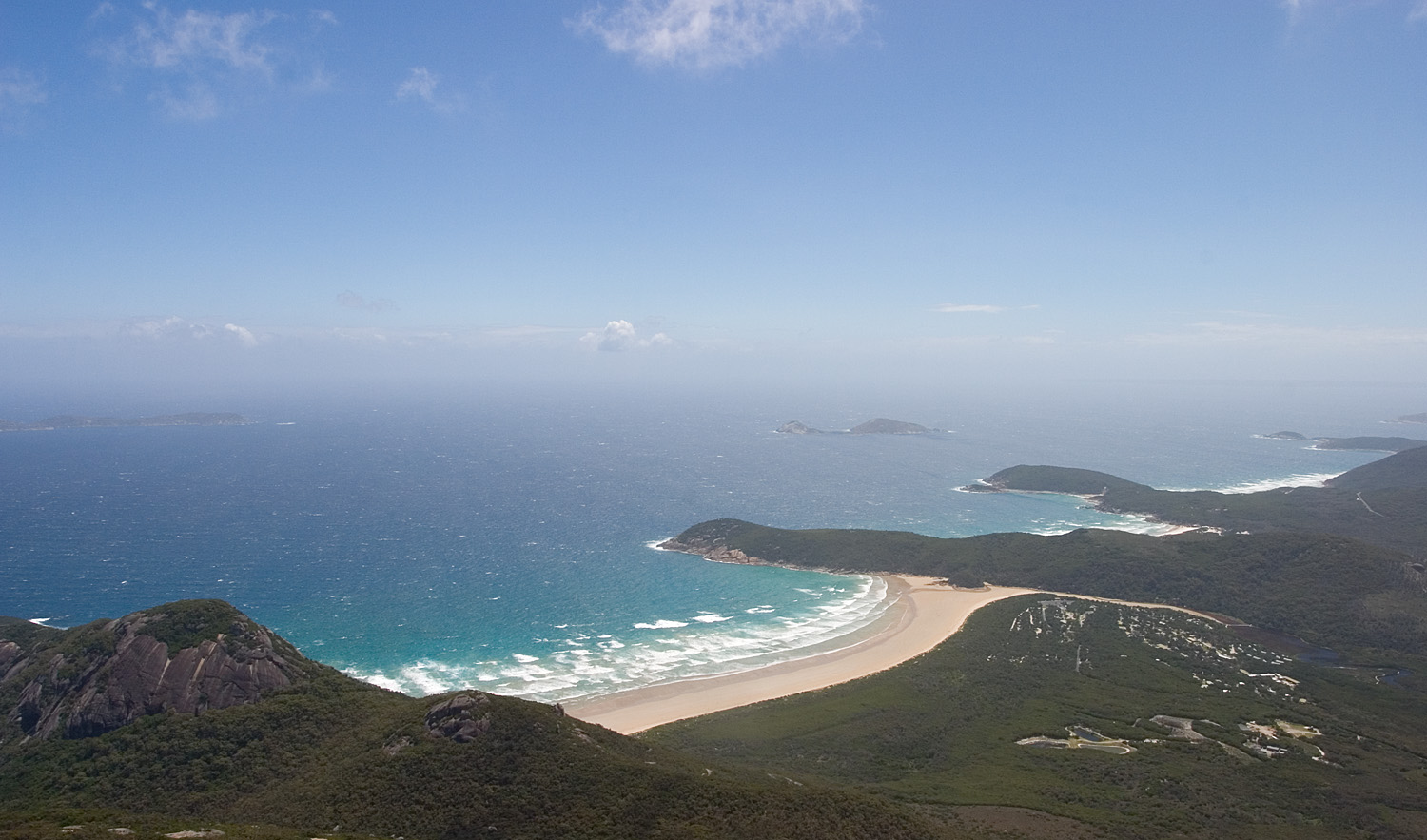
Tidal River as viewed from the summit of Mount Oberon.

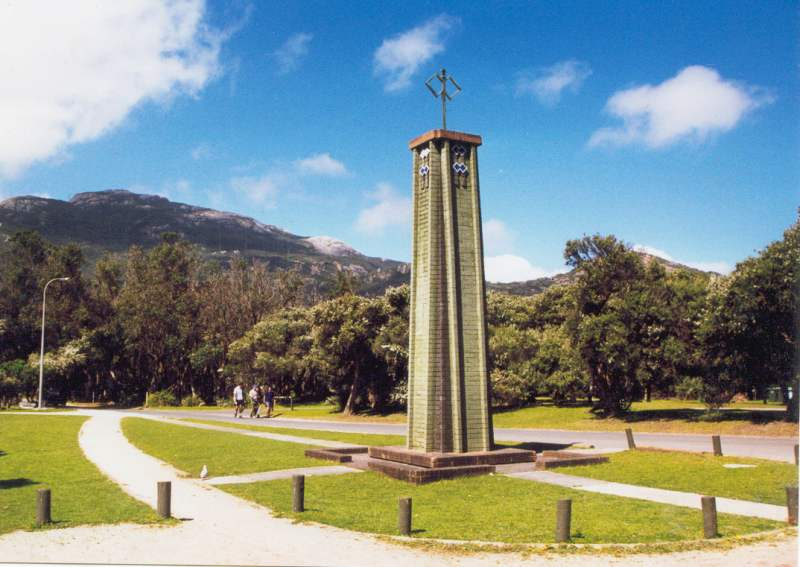
The Independent Companies Memorial with Mount Oberon in the background.

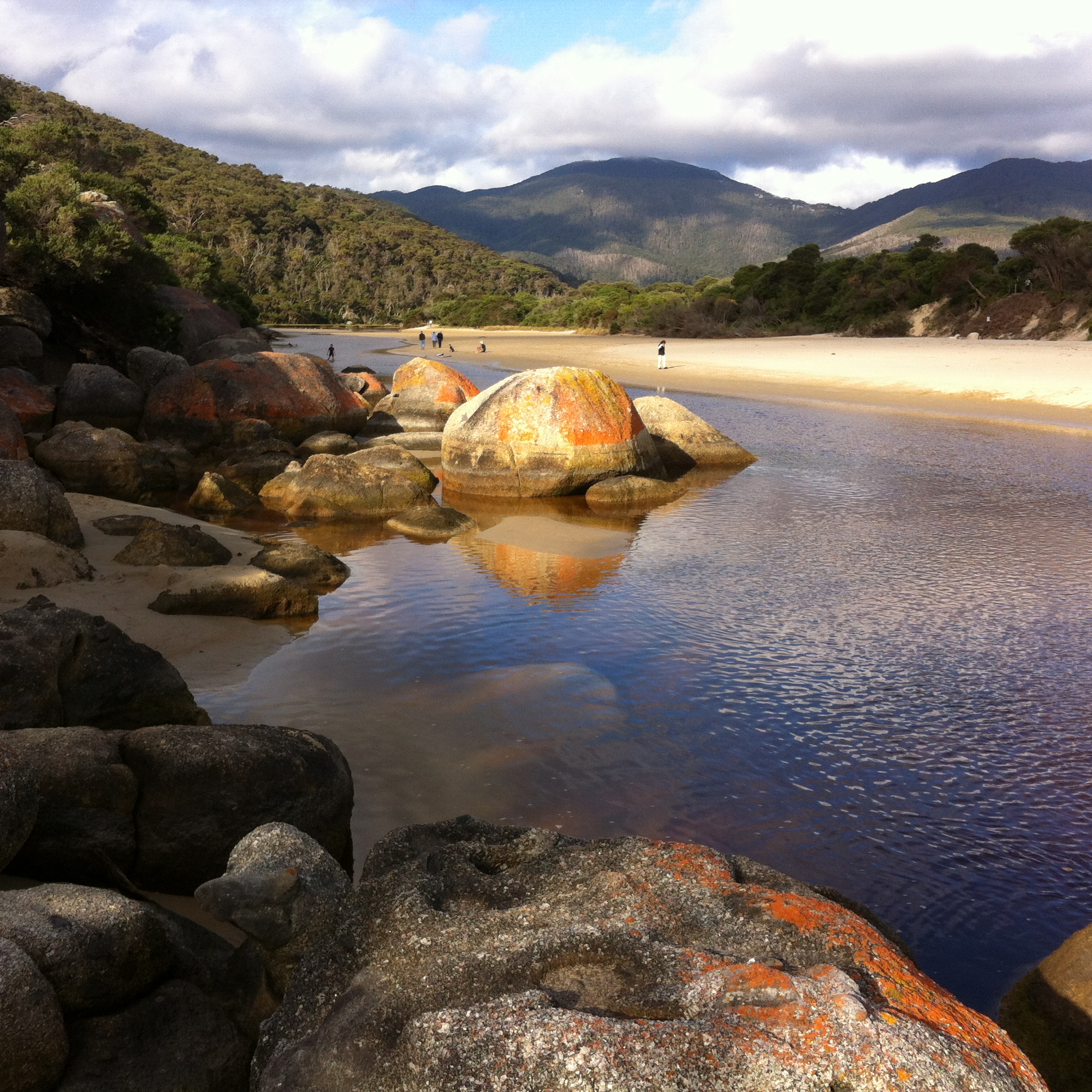
View of the river looking upstream
