= Crystal Cove =

Crystal Cove can refer to:

- Crystal Cove State Park
  - Crystal Cove Historic District, which is part of Crystal Cove State Park
- Crystal Cove State Marine Conservation Area
- Crystal Cove, a fictional town from the series Scooby-Doo! Mystery Incorporated and Velma
- Crystal Cove, the codename for a revised version of the Oculus Rift developer kit
