= Laguna Beach, California =

City in the United States

- City
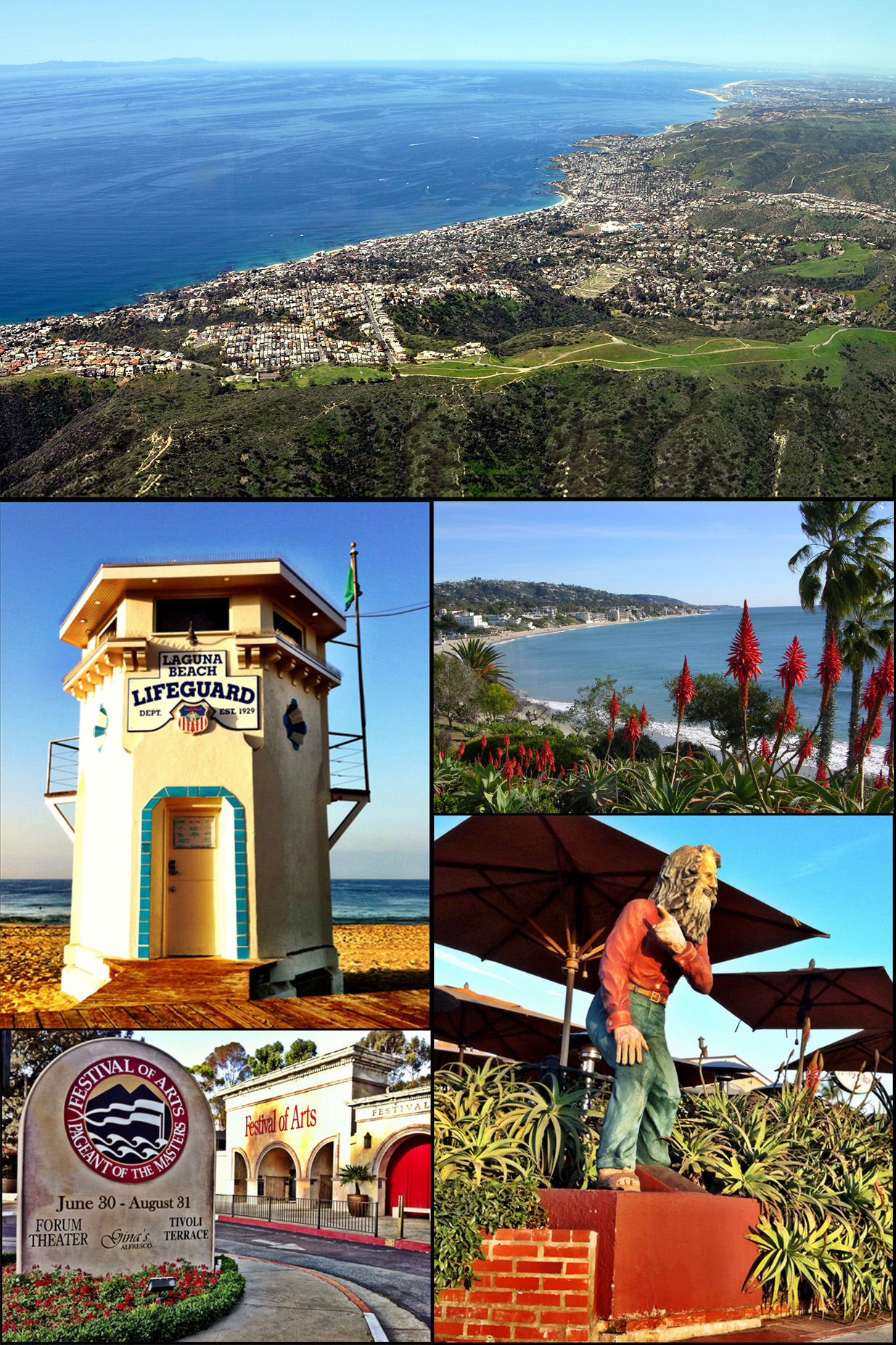
- Images from top, left to right: Aerial Photo of Laguna Beach, Lifeguard Tower, Three Arch Bay, Festival of Arts, and statue of Town Greeter Eiler Larsen

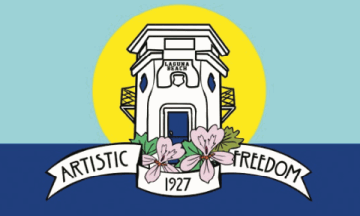
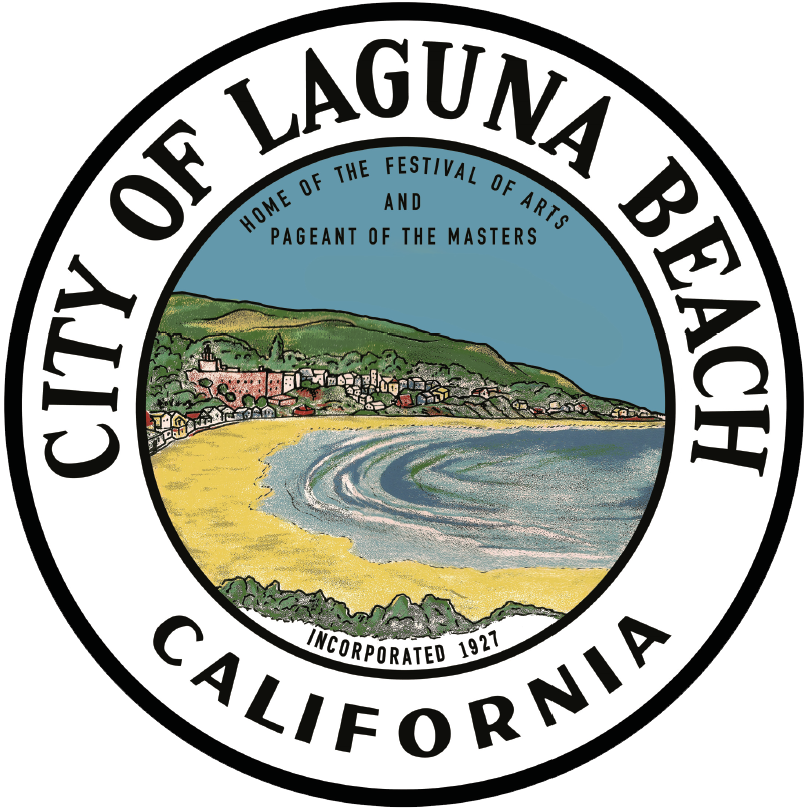
- Flag Seal
- Interactive map of Laguna Beach, California
- Location in the Los Angeles Metropolitan Area Location in California Location in the United States Location in North America
- Coordinates: 33°31′53″N 117°46′9″W
- Country: United States
- State: California
- County: Orange
- Founded (post office): 1887
- Incorporated (city): June 29, 1927

Government
  - Type: Council–manager
  - Mayor: Mark Orgill
  - Mayor Pro Tem: Hallie Jones
  - City Manager: Dave Kiff
  - Assistant City Manager: Gavin Curran

Area
  - Total: 9.86 sq mi (25.55 km^{2})
  - Land: 8.90 sq mi (23.04 km^{2})
  - Water: 0.97 sq mi (2.51 km^{2}) 9.89%
- Elevation: 20 ft (6 m)

Population (2020)
  - Total: 23,032
  - Density: 2,589/sq mi (999.7/km^{2})
- Time zone: UTC−8 (Pacific)
  - Summer (DST): UTC−7 (PDT)
- ZIP Codes: 92651–92652
- Area code: 949
- FIPS code: 06-39178
- GNIS feature IDs: 1660874, 2411595
- Website: lagunabeachcity.net

Laguna Beach (/ləˈɡuːnə/ lə-GOO-nə; laguna, Spanish for "lagoon") is a city in Orange County, California, United States. Located in Southern California along the Pacific Ocean, this seaside resort city has a mild year-round climate, scenic coves, and environmental preservation efforts. The population in the 2020 census was 23,032.

Historically settled by Paleoindians, the Tongva people, and then Mexico, the location became part of the United States following the Mexican–American War. Laguna Beach was settled in the 1870s, officially founded in 1887, and in 1927 its current government was incorporated as a city. The city adopted the council–manager form of government in 1944. The city has remained relatively isolated from urban encroachment by its surrounding hills, limited highway access, and dedicated greenbelt. The Laguna Beach coastline is protected by 5.88 miles (9.46 km) of state marine reserve and an additional 1.21 miles (1.95 km) of state conservation area.

Tourism is the primary industry with an estimated six million people visiting the community annually. Large annual events include the Pageant of the Masters, Festival of Arts, Sawdust Art Festival, Art-A-Fair, Bluewater Music Festival, and Kelpfest.

== History ==
=== Tongva Era ===
Laguna Beach was the site of a prehistoric paleoindian civilization. In 1933, the first fossilized skull of a paleoindian found in California was uncovered during construction on St. Ann's Drive. Known as "Laguna Woman", the skull originally was radiocarbon dated to more than 17,000 BP, but revised measurements suggest it originated during the Holocene era, 11,700 years BP. Subsequent research has found several prehistoric encampment sites in the area.

The indigenous people of the Laguna Beach area were the Tongva. Aliso Creek served as a territorial boundary between Gabrieleno and Acjachemen groups, or Juaneños, named by Spanish missionaries who first encountered them in the 1500s. The area of Laguna Canyon was named on an 1841 Mexican land grant map as Cañada de las Lagunas (English: Glen of the Lagoons).

=== American Era ===
After the Mexican–American War ended in 1848, the area of Alta California was ceded to the United States pursuant to the Treaty of Guadalupe Hidalgo. The treaty provided that Mexican land grants be honored and Rancho San Joaquin, which included north Laguna Beach, was granted to José Antonio Andres Sepúlveda prior to the war. Following a drought in 1864, Sepúlveda sold the property to James Irvine. The majority of Laguna Beach was one of the few parcels of coastal land in Southern California that never was included in any Mexican land grant.

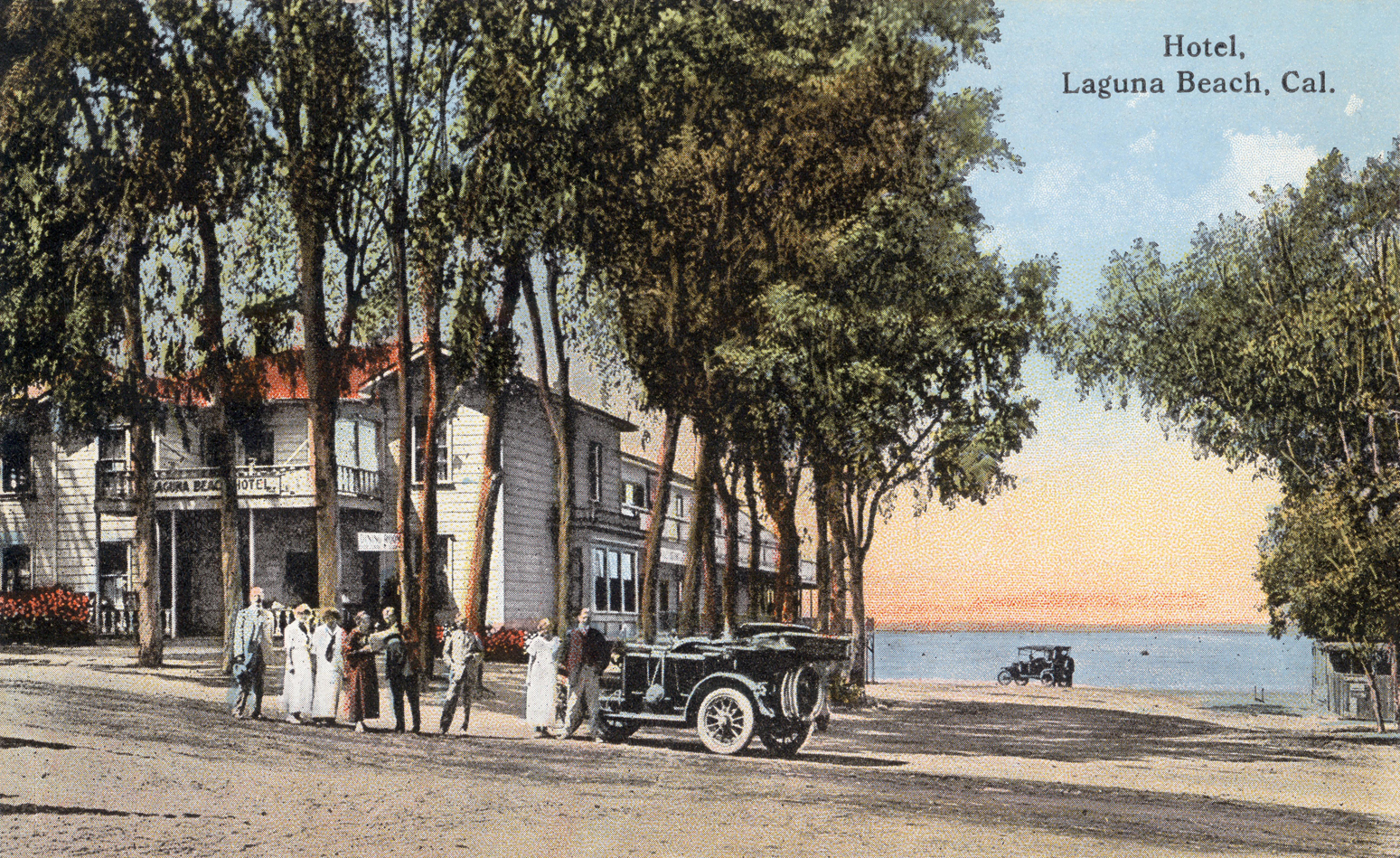
Pre-1917 postcard of Joseph Yoch's original Hotel Laguna, built in 1888 and replaced in 1930

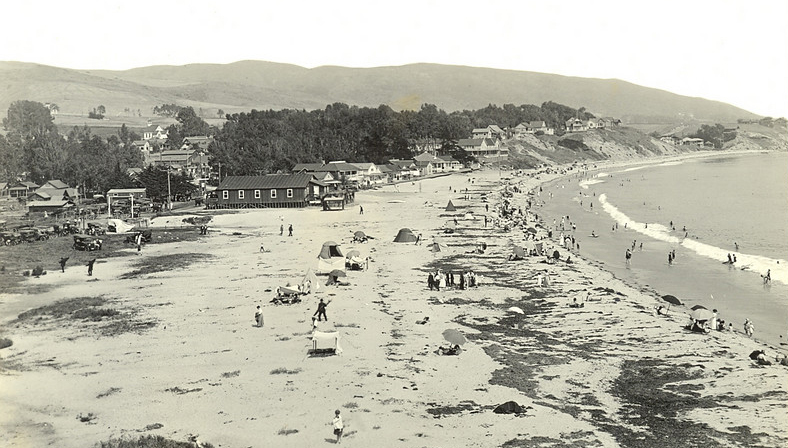
View of the Main Beach c. 1915

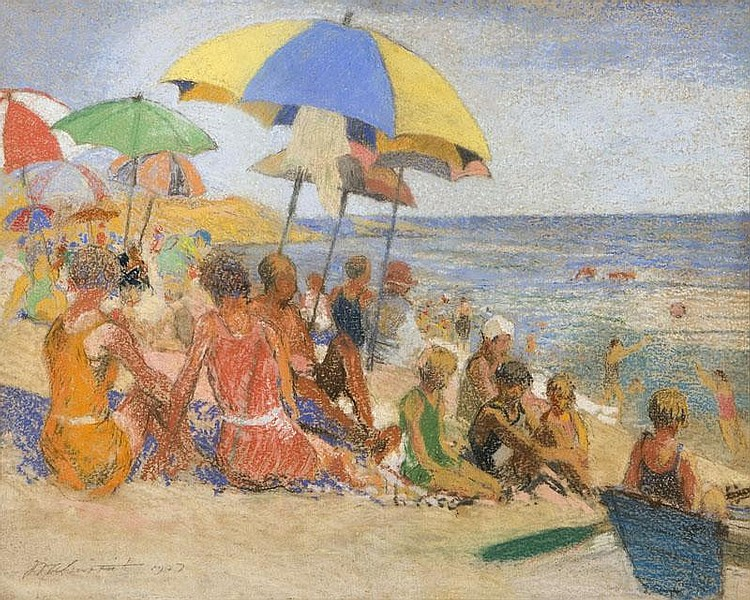
Painting of Laguna Beach around 1920; William Alexander Griffith.

Settlers arrived after the American Civil War. They were encouraged by the Homestead Act and Timber Culture Act, which granted up to 160 acres (65 ha) of land to a homesteader who would plant at least 40 acres (16 ha) of trees. In Laguna Beach, settlers planted groves of eucalyptus trees. In 1871, the first permanent homestead in the area was occupied by the George and Sarah Thurston family of Utah on 152 acres (62 ha) of Aliso Creek Canyon. In 1876, the brothers William and Lorenzo Nathan "Nate" Brooks purchased tracts of land in Bluebird Canyon at present-day Diamond Street. They subdivided their land, built homes and initiated the small community of Arch Beach. In his book, History of Orange County, California (1921), Samuel Armor cited the permanent homestead of Nate Brooks as the beginning of the modern day town and described Brooks as the "Father of Laguna Beach".

The community in Laguna Canyon and around the main beach expanded during the 1880s. The city officially founded a post office in 1887 under the name Lagona, but the postmaster in 1904, Nicholas Isch, successfully petitioned for a name correction to Laguna Beach. By then Laguna Beach already had developed into a tourist destination. Hubbard Goff built a large hotel at Arch Beach in 1886, which later was moved and added to Joseph Yoch's Laguna Beach Hotel built in 1888 on the main beach. Visitors from local cities pitched tents on the beaches for vacation during the warm summers.

=== 20th century ===
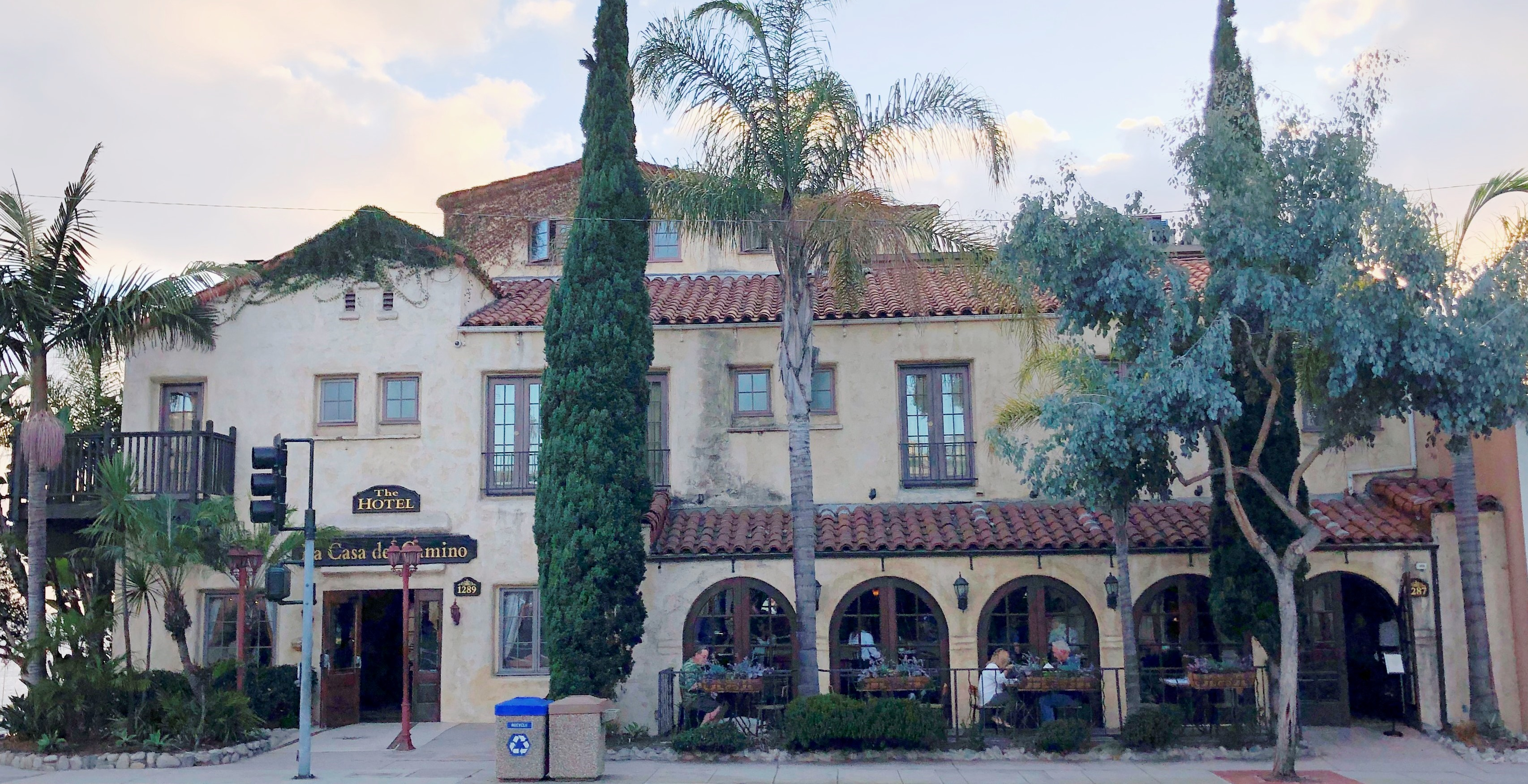
Casa del Camino, built in 1929

The scenic beauty of the isolated coastline and hills attracted plein-air painters in the early 1900s. William Wendt, Frank Cuprien, and Edgar Payne among others settled there and formed the Laguna Beach Art Association. The first art gallery opened in 1918 and later became the Laguna Beach Art Museum. Precursors to The Festival of Arts and the Pageant of the Masters began in 1921, and eventually were established in their present-day form by Roy Ropp in 1936. Due to its proximity to Hollywood, Laguna also became a favorite filming location. Starting in 1913, dozens of silent films were made at local coves with Harold Lloyd, Mary Pickford, Douglas Fairbanks Jr., and others. Actors and film crews stayed during long production shoots at the Arch Beach Tavern on the hillside above Moss Street.

The arrival of painters, photographers, filmmakers, and writers established Laguna Beach as a noted artist community. Although there only were approximately 300 residents in 1920, a large proportion of them worked in creative fields. The small town remained isolated until 1926 because the long, winding Laguna Canyon road served as the only access. With the completion of the Pacific Coast Highway in 1926, a population boom was expected. To protect the small-town atmosphere of the art colony, residents who called themselves "Lagunatics" pushed for incorporation. The municipal government for Laguna Beach incorporated as a city on June 29, 1927. The city has experienced steady population growth since that time, rising from 1,900 residents in 1927 to more than 10,000 in 1962, and becoming four times larger in area.

Time lapse flight up the Laguna Beach coastline at 1000 feet AGL.

Many creative, bohemian, and wealthy people have made Laguna Beach their home. They have added to the local culture by providing a theme for the small town. Adventurer Richard Halliburton built his Hangover House on the slopes of South Laguna. Hildegarde Hawthorne, granddaughter of the novelist Nathaniel Hawthorne, described Laguna "as a child of that deathless search, particularly by persons who devote their lives to painting or writing, or for some place where beauty and cheapness and a trifle of remoteness hobnob together in a delightful companionship."

Laguna Beach was the Southern California epicenter of the 'alternative' hippie culture in the late 1960s and early 1970s. In early 1967, John Griggs and other founding members of the Brotherhood of Eternal Love relocated from Modjeska Canyon to the Woodland Drive neighborhood of Laguna Beach, which they later renamed "Dodge City". Timothy Leary lived in a beach house on Gaviota Drive. The Utsava Rajneesh Meditation Center was located on Laguna Canyon Road and was the last remaining commune in the United States for followers of the spiritual teacher and guru Osho, Bhagwan Shree Rajneesh.

The city was deemed a smoke-free place by Laguna Beach Council on May 23, 2017. Ordinance 1624 was imposed by the Beach Council to prohibit smoking in all public places in the city.

Since the founding of Laguna Beach Art Association in 1913, the community has been considered an open-minded artist village. The election of Robert F. Gentry in 1982 marked the first openly gay elected official in southern California and the first openly gay mayor in the state. The city has held a sizable LGBTQ population since the 20th century. The Boom Boom Room of the Coast Inn was a nightclub and disco that predominately catered to the gay community until it shut down in 2007.

=== 1993 fire ===
In October 1993, a fire in Laguna Beach destroyed or damaged 441 homes and burned more than 14,000 acres (5,700 ha). The National Fire Protection Association listed it as the seventh-largest loss wildland fire in the United States. To avoid a recurrence of the damage to animals that occurred during the fire, a wildlife corridor is being created between Laguna Beach and the Cleveland National Forest in order to ensure that animals can retreat from fire safely if needed.

== Geography ==
Laguna Main Beach

Laguna Beach is part of the Los Angeles metropolitan area. According to the United States Census Bureau, Laguna Beach has a total area of 25.4 km^{2} (9.8 sq mi), of which 22.9 km^{2} (8.8 sq mi) are land and 2.5 km^{2} (0.97 sq mi) are covered by water. Its coastline is 7 mi (11 km) long and includes 27 beaches and coves. It is bordered by the Pacific Ocean on the southwest, Crystal Cove State Park on the northwest, Laguna Woods on the northeast, Aliso Viejo and Laguna Niguel on the east, and Dana Point on the southeast. It also borders the unincorporated community of Emerald Bay, which divides the northernmost part of its coastline (Irvine Cove) from the rest of the city's coast.

North Laguna Aerial photo

The land in and around Laguna Beach rises quickly from the shoreline into the hills and canyons of the San Joaquin Hills. The town's highest point, at an elevation of 1,007 feet (307 m), is Temple Hill in the Top of the World neighborhood. Because of its hilly topography and surrounding parklands, few roads run into or out of town; only the Coast Highway connecting to Newport Beach to the northwest and to Dana Point to the south, and State Route 133 crossing the hills in a northeastern direction through Laguna Canyon. Parts of Laguna Beach border the Aliso/Wood Canyons Regional Park.

The natural landscape of beaches, rocky bluffs, and craggy canyons have been noted as sources of inspiration for plein air painters and landscape photographers who have settled in the Laguna Beach since the early 1900s. The hills also are known internationally for mountain biking. Laguna Coast Wilderness Park is a 7,000-acre (2,800 ha) wilderness area in the hills surrounding Laguna Beach. This park features coastal canyons, ridgeline views, and the only natural lakes in Orange County. Wildlife that can be found on Laguna Beach includes the Lined Shore Crab, Black Oystercatchers, Barred Sand Bass, Spiny Lobsters and the Great White Egret. Due to the numerous steep cliffs, landslides have occurred in Laguna Beach. One incident occurred on Jan 31, 2025 and resulted in temporary closure of Thousand Steps Beach.

=== Biogeography ===
The most common native species: Red Sand Verbena, Pink Sand Verbena, and Big Leaf Maple.

Laguna Beach, California

Climate chart (precipitation, max. and min. temperature)
J	F	M	A	M	J	J	A	S	O	N	D
0.8 79 59	1.5 78 59	0.7 70 58	0.9 87 59	0 71 61	0 87 70	0 84 70	0 90 70	0 105 76	0 83 70	0 80 58	0 80 55
- █ Average max. and min. temperatures in °F
- █ Precipitation totals in inches
- Source: Weather Underground
Metric conversion
J	F	M	A	M	J	J	A	S	O	N	D
21 26 15	38 26 15	18 21 14	24 31 15	0 22 16	0 31 21	0 29 21	0 32 21	0 41 24	0 28 21	0 27 14	0 27 13
- █ Average max. and min. temperatures in °C
- █ Precipitation totals in mm

=== Climate ===
Under the Köppen climate classification, Laguna Beach has a Cold semi-arid climate classified as BSk. The weather is considered mild with abundant sunshine all year. The average daily high temperature ranges from 68 °F (20 °C) in January to 80 °F (27 °C) in August. Mean annual precipitation is relatively low, at 13.56 inches (344 mm). The average ocean water temperatures range from about 59 °F (15 °C) in February to 68 °F (20 °C) in August, with early to mid-September water temperatures often peaking at about 72 °F (22 °C). However, the ocean surface temperatures along the beaches of Laguna Beach may vary by several degrees from the average, dependent upon offshore winds, air temperature, and sunshine.

Climate data for Laguna Beach, California (1991–2020 normals, extremes 1928–2010)
Month	Jan	Feb	Mar	Apr	May	Jun	Jul	Aug	Sep	Oct	Nov	Dec	Year
Record high °F (°C)	89 (32)	92 (33)	92 (33)	97 (36)	96 (36)	96 (36)	100 (38)	100 (38)	104 (40)	100 (38)	100 (38)	90 (32)	104 (40)
Mean maximum °F (°C)	78.8 (26.0)	78.9 (26.1)	80.0 (26.7)	83.2 (28.4)	80.9 (27.2)	82.3 (27.9)	85.7 (29.8)	88.1 (31.2)	90.3 (32.4)	88.3 (31.3)	82.4 (28.0)	75.6 (24.2)	93.9 (34.4)
Mean daily maximum °F (°C)	68.4 (20.2)	67.8 (19.9)	69.3 (20.7)	72.5 (22.5)	74.5 (23.6)	76.0 (24.4)	79.5 (26.4)	81.2 (27.3)	81.0 (27.2)	77.2 (25.1)	72.2 (22.3)	67.3 (19.6)	73.9 (23.3)
Daily mean °F (°C)	56.3 (13.5)	56.3 (13.5)	58.6 (14.8)	61.3 (16.3)	64.5 (18.1)	66.9 (19.4)	69.8 (21.0)	71.2 (21.8)	69.7 (20.9)	66.2 (19.0)	60.3 (15.7)	55.6 (13.1)	63.1 (17.3)
Mean daily minimum °F (°C)	44.2 (6.8)	44.8 (7.1)	47.9 (8.8)	50.1 (10.1)	54.5 (12.5)	57.8 (14.3)	60.1 (15.6)	61.2 (16.2)	58.5 (14.7)	55.1 (12.8)	48.5 (9.2)	43.8 (6.6)	52.2 (11.2)
Mean minimum °F (°C)	34.7 (1.5)	36.9 (2.7)	38.9 (3.8)	41.7 (5.4)	46.3 (7.9)	49.8 (9.9)	53.2 (11.8)	53.5 (11.9)	51.6 (10.9)	45.8 (7.7)	39.0 (3.9)	34.6 (1.4)	32.4 (0.2)
Record low °F (°C)	21 (−6)	27 (−3)	28 (−2)	31 (−1)	33 (1)	37 (3)	38 (3)	38 (3)	40 (4)	33 (1)	28 (−2)	24 (−4)	21 (−6)
Average precipitation inches (mm)	2.78 (71)	3.39 (86)	1.62 (41)	0.80 (20)	0.20 (5.1)	0.11 (2.8)	0.11 (2.8)	0.02 (0.51)	0.16 (4.1)	0.49 (12)	1.13 (29)	1.87 (47)	12.68 (321.31)
Average precipitation days (≥ 0.01 in)	6.1	6.5	4.3	2.8	1.1	0.8	0.4	0.1	0.6	1.6	2.5	4.3	31.1
Mean daily sunshine hours	7	8	9	10	9	9	11	11	9	8	7	7	9
Mean daily daylight hours	10.2	11.0	12.0	13.0	13.9	14.4	14.1	13.4	12.4	11.3	10.4	10.0	12.2
Average ultraviolet index	3	4	6	8	9	10	10	10	8	6	4	3	7
Source 1: NOAA (mean maxima/minima 1981–2010)
Source 2: Weather Atlas

== Demographics ==
Historical population
Census	Pop.	Note	%±
1930	1,981		—
1940	4,460		125.1%
1950	6,661		49.3%
1960	9,288		39.4%
1970	14,550		56.7%
1980	17,858		22.7%
1990	23,170		29.7%
2000	23,727		2.4%
2010	22,723		−4.2%
2020	23,032		1.4%
U.S. Decennial Census; 1860–1870 1880–1890; 1900 1910 1920; 1930 1940 1950; 1960 1970 1980; 1990 2000 2010; 2020

After incorporation in 1927, Laguna Beach appeared as a city in the 1930 U.S. Census as part of Laguna Beach Township.

=== Racial and ethnic composition ===
Laguna Beach city, California – Racial and ethnic composition Note: the US Census treats Hispanic/Latino as an ethnic category. This table excludes Latinos from the racial categories and assigns them to a separate category. Hispanics/Latinos may be of any race.
Race / Ethnicity (NH = Non-Hispanic)	Pop 1980	Pop 1990	Pop 2000	Pop 2010	Pop 2020	% 1980	% 1990	% 2000	% 2010	% 2020
White alone (NH)	16,767	20,984	20,921	19,472	18,328	93.67%	90.57%	88.17%	85.69%	79.58%
Black or African American alone (NH)	35	156	183	158	181	0.20%	0.67%	0.77%	0.70%	0.79%
Native American or Alaska Native alone (NH)	81	50	59	34	25	0.42%	0.22%	0.25%	0.15%	0.11%
Asian alone (NH)	181	379	486	797	961	1.01%	1.64%	2.05%	3.51%	4.17%
Native Hawaiian or Pacific Islander alone (NH)	181	379	19	13	18	1.01%	1.64%	0.08%	0.06%	0.08%
Other race alone (NH)	32	11	36	52	130	0.18%	0.11%	0.15%	0.23%	0.56%
Mixed race or Multiracial (NH)	x	x	453	547	1,234	x	x	1.91%	2.41%	5.36%
Hispanic or Latino (any race)	805	1,590	1,570	1,650	2,155	4.50%	6.86%	6.62%	7.26%	9.36%
Total	17,901	23,170	23,727	22,723	23,032	100.00%	100.00%	100.00%	100.00%	100.00%

=== 2020 census ===
As of the 2020 census, Laguna Beach had a population of 23,032 and a population density of 2,589.6 inhabitants per square mile (999.9/km^{2}).

The census reported that 99.4% of the population lived in households, 0.6% lived in non-institutionalized group quarters, and no one was institutionalized.

There were 10,758 households, out of which 18.9% included children under the age of 18. Of all households, 44.8% were married-couple households, 6.8% were cohabiting couple households, 27.2% had a female householder with no spouse or partner present, and 21.2% had a male householder with no spouse or partner present. About 34.0% of households were one person, and 14.2% were one person aged 65 or older. The average household size was 2.13, and 6,097 families made up 56.7% of all households.

The age distribution was 14.3% under the age of 18, 7.1% aged 18 to 24, 18.7% aged 25 to 44, 33.7% aged 45 to 64, and 26.3% who were 65 years of age or older. The median age was 52.0 years. For every 100 females, there were 98.8 males, and for every 100 females age 18 and over there were 97.6 males.

There were 12,973 housing units, of which 10,758 (82.9%) were occupied and 17.1% were vacant. Of occupied units, 59.8% were owner-occupied and 40.2% were occupied by renters. The homeowner vacancy rate was 1.7%, and the rental vacancy rate was 7.6%.

=== 2010 census ===
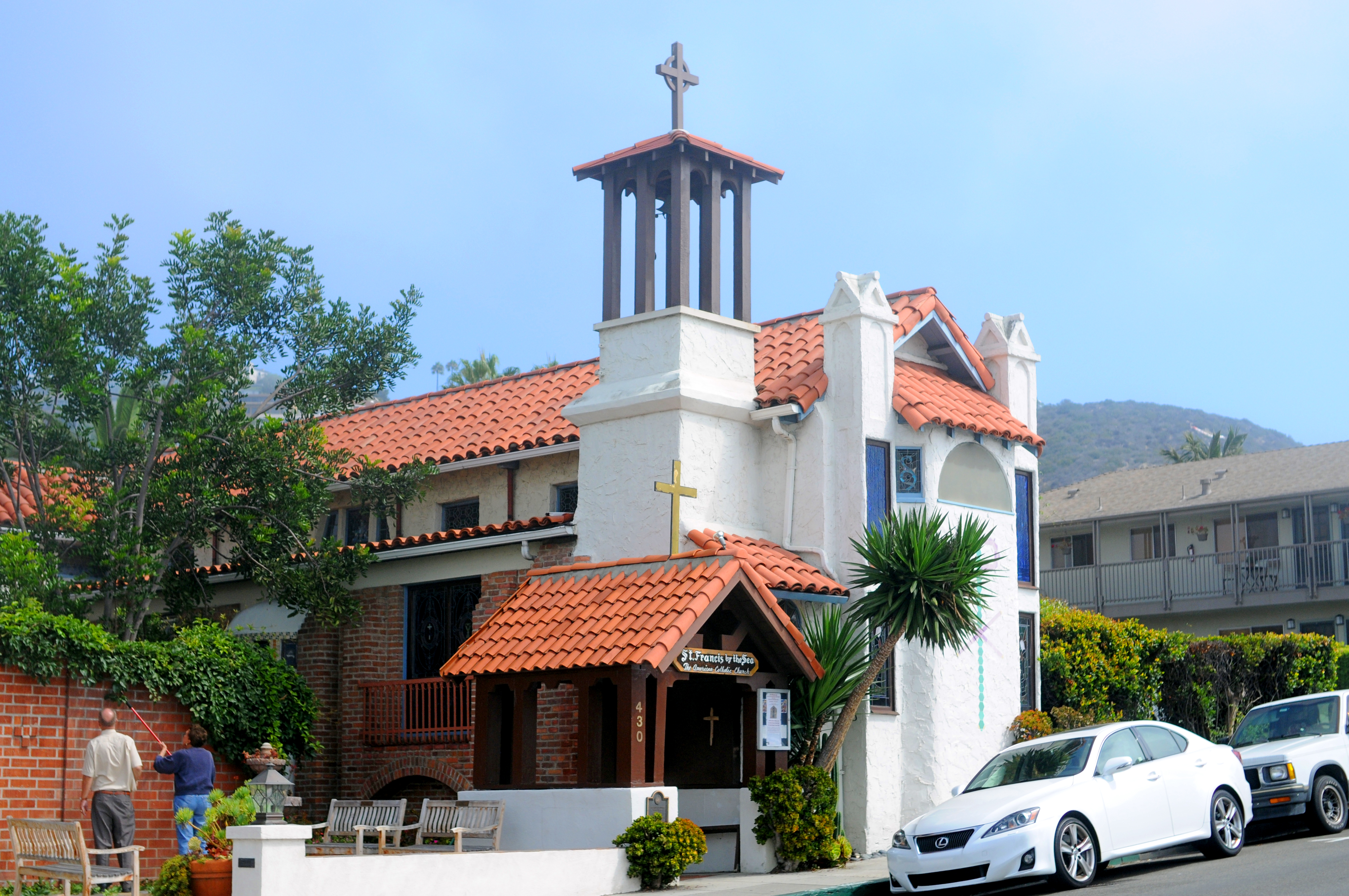
St. Francis by-the-Sea American Catholic Church

The 2010 United States census reported that 22,723 people, 10,821 households, and 5,791 families resided in the city. The population density was 2,313.8 inhabitants per square mile (893.4/km^{2}). The 12,923 housing units averaged 1,315.9 units per square mile (508.1 units/km^{2}). The racial makeup of Laguna Beach was 90.9% White (85.7% non-Hispanic White), 0.8% African American, 0.3% Native American, 3.6% Asian, 1.51% from other races, and 2.9% from two or more races. About 7.3% of the population was Hispanic or Latino of any race.

The census reported that 99.6% of the population lived in households, and 0.4% lived in noninstitutionalized group quarters. Of the 10,821 households, 20.1% had children under the age of 18 living in them, 43.6% were opposite-sex married couples living together, 6.3% had a female householder with no husband present, and 3.6% had a male householder with no wife present. 5.2% of households were unmarried opposite-sex partnerships, and 2.8% were same-sex married couples or partnerships. About 35.2% of households were made up of individuals, and 10.4% had someone living alone who was 65 years of age or older. The average household size was 2.09. The average family size was 2.72.

The population was distributed as 16.1% under the age of 18, 4.8% aged 18 to 24, 23.4% aged 25 to 44, 37.4% aged 45 to 64, and 18.3% who were 65 years of age or older. The median age was 50.6. For every 100 females, there were 100.6 males. For every 100 females age 18 and over, there were 99.8 males.

Of 12,923 housing units, 60.0% were owner-occupied and 40.0% were occupied by renters. The homeowner vacancy rate was 1.7%; the rental vacancy rate was 7.7%, and 64.6% of the population lived in owner-occupied housing units and 35.0% lived in rental housing units.

=== Income and poverty ===
During 2009–2013, Laguna Beach had a median household income of $94,325, with 6.3% of the population living below the federal poverty line.

In 2023, the US Census Bureau estimated that the median household income was $140,508, and the per capita income was $110,736. About 2.1% of families and 5.8% of the population were below the poverty line.

=== Crime ===
The Uniform Crime Report (UCR), collected annually by the FBI, compiles police statistics from local and state law enforcement agencies across the nation. The UCR records Part I and Part II crimes. Part I crimes become known to law enforcement and are considered the most serious crimes including homicide, rape, robbery, aggravated assault, burglary, larceny, motor vehicle theft, and arson. Part II crimes only include arrest data. The 2023 UCR Data for Laguna Beach is listed below:

2023 UCR Data
	Aggravated Assault	Homicide	Rape	Robbery	Burglary	Larceny Theft	Motor Vehicle Theft	Arson
Laguna Beach	88	1	10	15	61	243	43	1

== Arts and culture ==
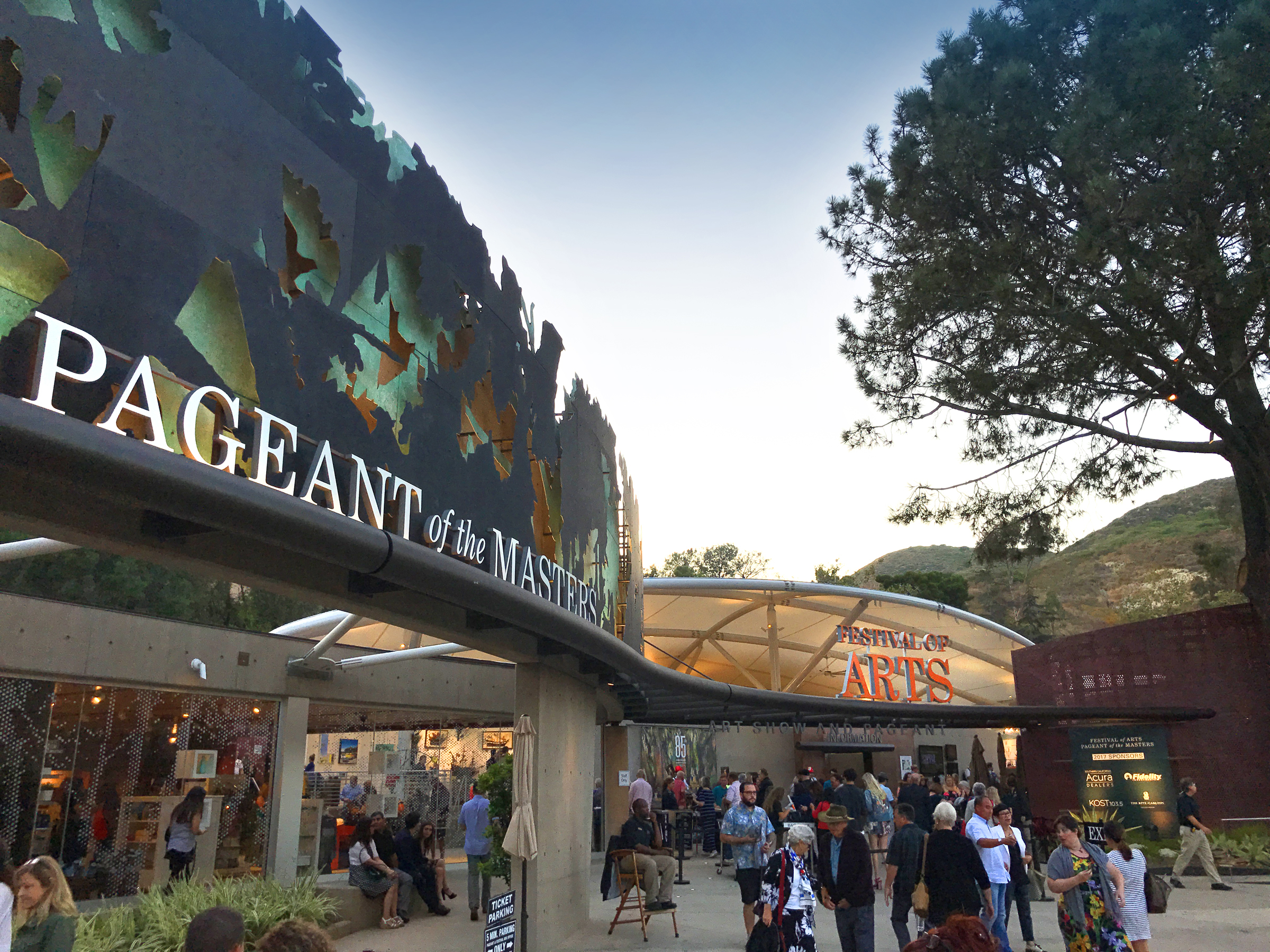
Entrance to Festival of Arts and Pageant of the Masters

The Laguna Art Museum is rooted in the development of Laguna Beach as an art community with the creation of the Laguna Beach Art Association in 1918. Located beside the main beach, the museum focuses on the art of California. The Pageant of the Masters, founded in 1933, is held annually during the summer months. The unique show presents recreations of famous artworks using real people as models. Community organizations also host several long-running art festivals during the summer season.

The Festival of Arts Fine Art Show, which underwent a major renovation in 2017, originated in the 1930s. It showcases juried works by 140 Orange County artists, and its stage provides a venue for daily musical performances in July and August of each year. The Sawdust Art Festival was founded in 1965 as a counterculture alternative to the Festival of Arts. It exhibits non-juried crafts and arts on a dedicated 3-acre (1.2-hectare) site. The Art-A-Fair began in 1966, built an exhibition site in 1977 and exhibits juried works of 125 artists from outside the area.

The Laguna Playhouse, founded in 1920, is noted as the "oldest continuously running theatre on the west coast". The playhouse provides professional stage productions in its 420-seat Moulton Theater, as well as performances by the Laguna Playhouse Youth Theatre program. The Irvine Bowl is a 2600-seat amphitheater used for the Pageant of the Masters program and for occasional concerts.

The Laguna Beach Plein Air Painting Invitational is held annually in October. Some of North America's plein air landscape painters are invited to participate in the week-long events including public paint outs, artist meet and greets, and educational activities.

The Laguna Beach Arts Commission sponsors a weekly Summer Concert in the Park series at Bluebird Park and Heisler Park. The Laguna Beach Chamber Music Society holds an annual chamber music festival during the winter season. Laguna is also home to the annual Bluewater Music Festival, and Kelpfest held on Earth Day, to raise awareness of the importance that kelp plays in ocean habitat.

== Registered Historic Places ==
- Crystal Cove Historic District
- Mariona
- St. Francis by-the-sea American Catholic Church

== Sports ==
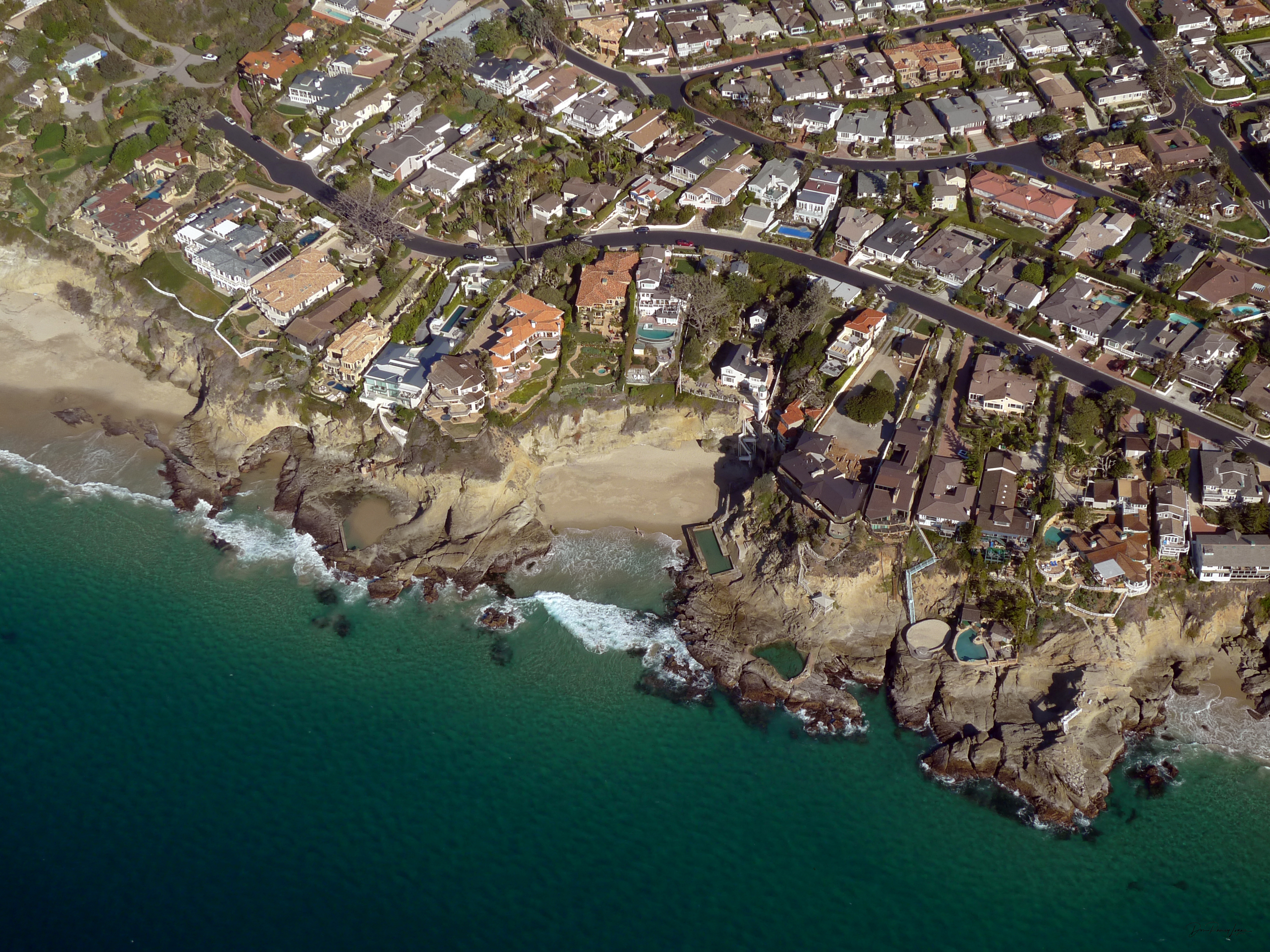
Private Pools line Three Arch Bay, Laguna Beach, CA

Laguna Beach has a surfing history centered on a five-block stretch of rocky reefs between Brooks and St. Ann's streets. The Brooks Street Surfing Classic, begun in 1955, is a "contender for the world's longest running surf competition," according to the Encyclopedia of Surfing. The competition is held only when peak swell conditions occur during a four-month-long window in the summer and has been held 52 times from 1955 to 2015. Participation is open only to Laguna Beach residents. Notable participants have included Hobie Alter, Mickey Munoz, and Tom Morey.

Started in 1976, the 'Vic' Skimboarding World Championship is held at Aliso Beach in Laguna Beach and is the longest running skim boarding contest on the pro circuit.

The Laguna Open Volleyball Tournament began in 1955 and, according to tournament directors, it is the second oldest volleyball tournament in the United States. Participants have included several Olympic gold medalists, including Chris Marlowe, Dusty Dvorak, Scott Fortune, Dain Blanton and Gene Selznick, who won the first seven competitions.

== Parks and recreation ==
Laguna's foothill trails are known internationally for mountain biking. Mountain bike hall of fame legend Hans Rey makes his home in Laguna Beach, as do the Rads, pioneers of mountain biking going back to the 1970s.

The U.S. Open for Lawnbowling is held annually at the lawn bowling field at Heisler Park. There is a historic tower, built in 1926, at Victoria Beach.

== Government ==
Laguna Beach was first settled in the 1870s, but was founded officially in 1887 and, in 1927 it incorporated as a city. Beginning in 1944, a council-manager form of government was adopted. Residents of Laguna Beach elect five non-partisan council members who serve four-year staggered terms, with elections occurring every two years. The position of mayor is non-elected and chosen annually among the members of the city council. The council serves to pass ordinances, approve a budget, and hire the city manager and city attorney. The city manager oversees administrative operations and the appointment of department heads. In 2011 Ken Frank retired after 31 years, one of the longest-serving city managers in Orange County history.

The city clerk and city treasurer are elected by popular vote and serve four-year terms.

=== County, state, and federal representation ===
Laguna Beach is located in the fifth district of the Orange County Board of Supervisors and is currently represented by Democrat Katrina Foley since 2023.

In the California State Legislature, the city is in the 36th senatorial district, represented by Republican Tony Strickland, and in the 72nd Assembly district, represented by Republican Diane Dixon.

In the United States House of Representatives, Laguna Beach is in California's 47th congressional district, represented by Democrat Dave Min.

According to the Orange County Registrar of Voters, as of May 12, 2025, Laguna Beach has 18,082 registered voters. Of those, 6,509 (38.12%) are registered Democrats, 5,042 (29.55%) are registered Republicans, and 4,620 (27.07%) have declined to state a political party/are independents.

Laguna Beach is a Democratic stronghold in presidential elections due to its cultural liberalism and LGBTQ+ community, as no Republican has won the city since George H. W. Bush in 1988. In 2008, Laguna Beach was one of only four incorporated cities in Orange County (along with Aliso Viejo, Costa Mesa, and Irvine) to reject Proposition 8, the ballot initiative that revoked marriage rights for same-sex couples in California. That same year during the Democratic presidential preference primary, Laguna Beach was one of three cities in Orange County where Democrats favored Barack Obama over Hillary Rodham Clinton.

== Education ==
=== Primary and secondary ===
The Laguna Beach Unified School District manages public education for city residents. The district includes one high school (Laguna Beach High School), one middle school (Thurston Middle School), and two elementary schools (El Morro Elementary School and Top of the World Elementary School). Students who live in the sall portion of Laguna Beach that borders Aliso Viejo, although contracted to the city's schools, may choose to attend the Capistrano Unified School District, as the schools are closer and much more accessible to their homes.

=== Higher education ===
The Laguna College of Art & Design (LCAD) is a small private college located in Laguna Canyon. It was founded in 1961 by the Festival of Arts and Laguna Art Museum as the Laguna Beach School of Art. LCAD offers Bachelor of Arts degrees in drawing and painting, illustration, animation, graphic design, and game art, and master of fine arts degrees in painting and drawing. In 2013, enrollment was approximately 450 students. The nearest public college is Saddleback College in Mission Viejo.

== Media ==
Laguna Beach is part of the Los Angeles media market. Laguna Beach also has its own FM community radio station, KXRN-LP. The community is served by an online newspaper, Stu News Laguna, and one weekly print newspaper, the Laguna Beach Independent.

== Infrastructure ==
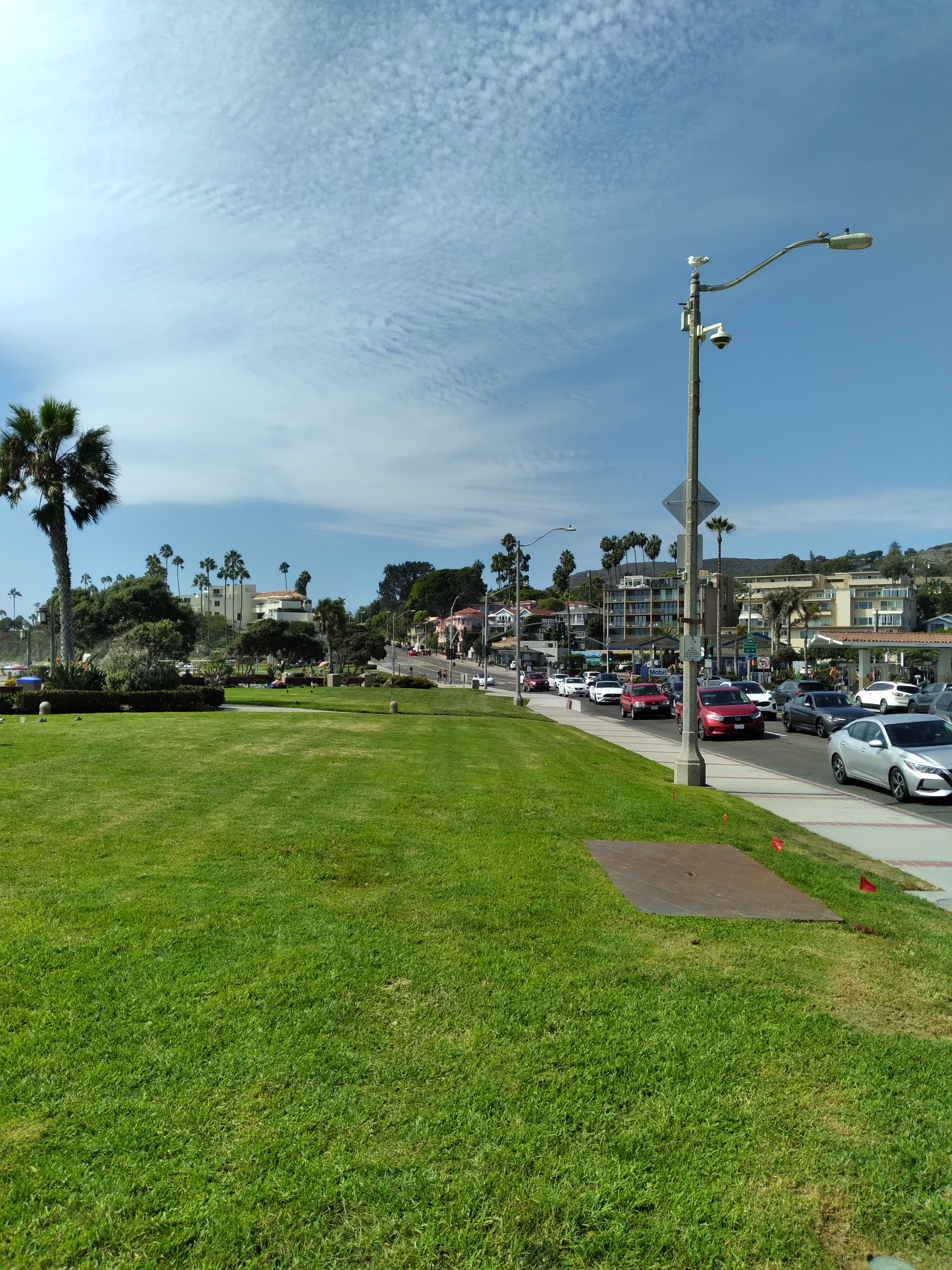
Laguna Beach along Pacific Coast Highway

=== Transportation ===
Orange County Transportation Authority operates two bus routes in Laguna Beach.

The major roads in Laguna Beach are: CA1, CA133, CA73 and S18.

=== Emergency services ===
Fire protection in Laguna Beach is provided by the Laguna Beach Fire Department, and law enforcement by the Laguna Beach Police Department. Marine safety services are provided by Laguna Beach City Lifeguards.

Laguna Beach has used goats for its fuel reduction and vegetation management program since the early 1990s.

=== Health care ===
Laguna Beach is served by one health care facility:

- Providence Mission Hospital Laguna Beach (Hospital)

=== Water services ===
A majority of the water in Laguna Beach is supplied by the Laguna Beach County Water District (LBCWD), with a small portion of South Laguna being supplied by South Coast Water District. Laguna Beach County Water District receives surface water from the Metropolitan Water District of Southern California (MWDSC), sourced from the Colorado River and the California State Water Project. LBCWD also obtains groundwater from a natural underground aquifer beneath the Santa Ana Basin.

== Conservation and environment ==
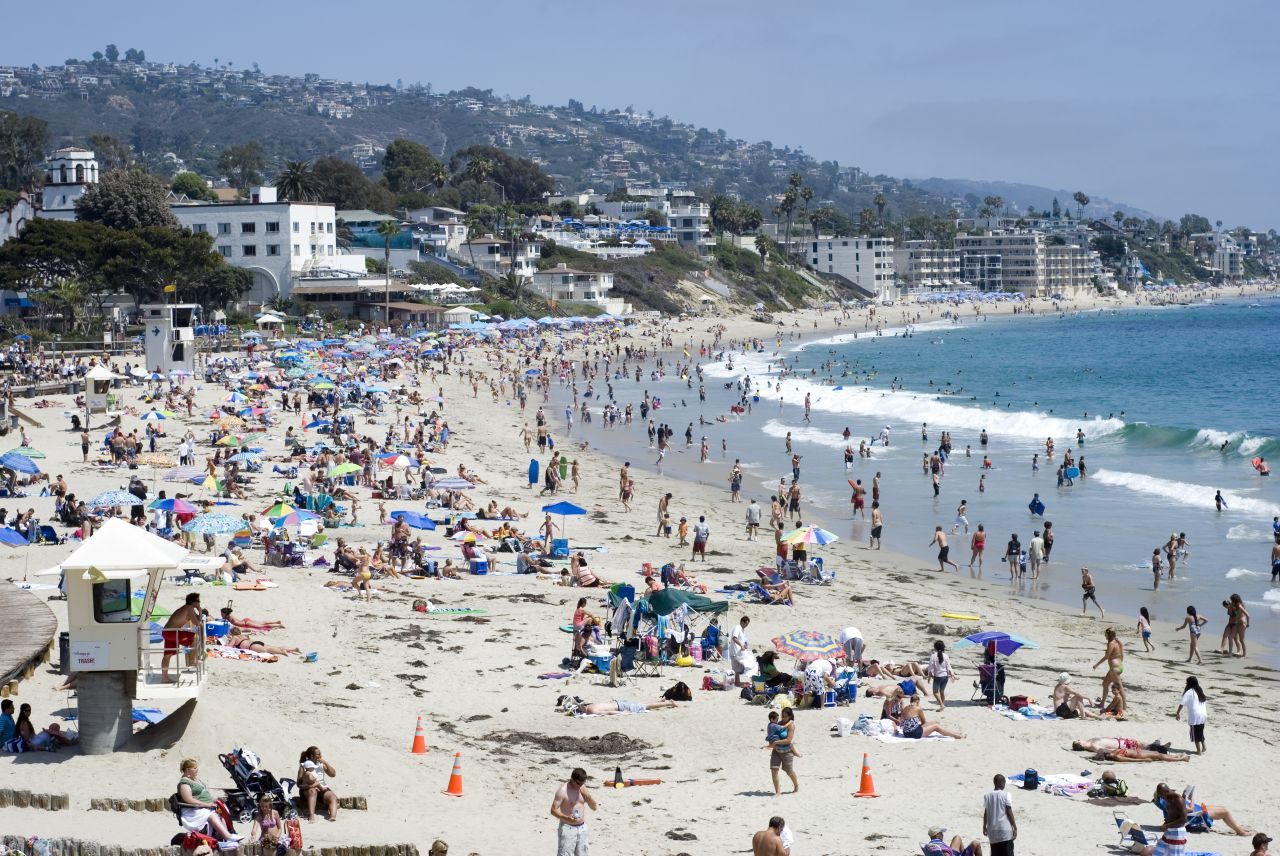
Main Beach in Laguna Beach

Laguna Beach is the only Orange County city protected by a dedicated greenbelt inland and bluebelt seaward. In 1968, local conservationists founded Laguna Greenbelt and began a drive to conserve a horseshoe of hills and canyons surrounding Laguna Beach. As of 2011, more than 20,000 acres (8,100 ha) of contiguous wildlands constituted The Laguna Coast Wilderness Park, Jim Dilley Preserve, Crystal Cove State Park, and the Aliso-Wood Canyons Wilderness Park.

The creation of the 7,000-acre (2,800 ha) Laguna Coast Wilderness Park as a protected area began in the late 1980s and early 1990s when local artists, activists and politicians rallied to preserve Laguna Canyon. With the environmentally focused Laguna Canyon Project and its photographic mural, "The Tell," as backdrop and stimulus, Laguna citizens forged a partnership to prevent construction of a 3,200-acre (1,300 ha) housing project in the canyon. An exhibition on the Laguna Canyon Project, titled "The Canyon Project: Artivism," was held at Laguna Art Museum in 2015–16. Today the Wilderness Park and Laguna Canyon within it are designated as open space in perpetuity.

The Laguna Beach State Marine Reserve (LBSMR), which extends from Irvine Cove to Treasure Island Beach, was established in 2012, to make most of the coastal area a no-take zone. Docents of the Laguna Ocean Foundation provide monitoring and education at tidepools within the LBSMR. In addition, the 3.2-mile-long (5.1 km) Crystal Cove State Park abuts the northern border of Laguna Beach.

As a result of Laguna's Marine Protected Area "no-take zones" the local waters teem with fish, including sheepshead and large calico bass.

American Craftsman Bungalows from the early 1900s dot the downtown and South Laguna areas. Between 1980 and 1981, the city conducted the Laguna Beach Historic Survey, a citywide block-by-block study which noted the location of pre-1940 buildings and determined which had historic significance. 706 homes and structures in Laguna Beach were classified as historically significant.

Laguna Beach is the tenth official Transition Town in the U.S. In February 2007, Laguna's city council unanimously voted to join the U.S. Mayors Climate Initiative, and in April 2013 became the first Orange County city to make a formal request that the San Onofre Nuclear Reactor not be restarted after its January 2012 shutdown. The Aliso Creek Water Reclamation Facility went into operation in 2014. The facility removes polluted runoff in Aliso Creek, improves ocean water quality, and creates locally recycled water. With a grant from Cal Trans, the city is undertaking a transition plan to implement Complete Streets for all users. A north–south bicycle route with signs and sharrows was completed through town in 2014.

== In popular culture ==
The 1972 instrumental by Black Sabbath "Laguna Sunrise" was inspired by a sunrise guitarist Tony Iommi witnessed after a night of partying. In 2004, MTV created a reality television show entitled Laguna Beach: The Real Orange County, which aired for three seasons.

Laguna Beach is the setting for the Netflix television series Dead to Me.

== Sister cities ==
Laguna Beach has three sister cities:

- Menton, France
- San José del Cabo, Mexico
- St Ives, United Kingdom

== See also ==
- List of beaches in California
