= Victoria Beach Pirate Tower =

Historic tower in California

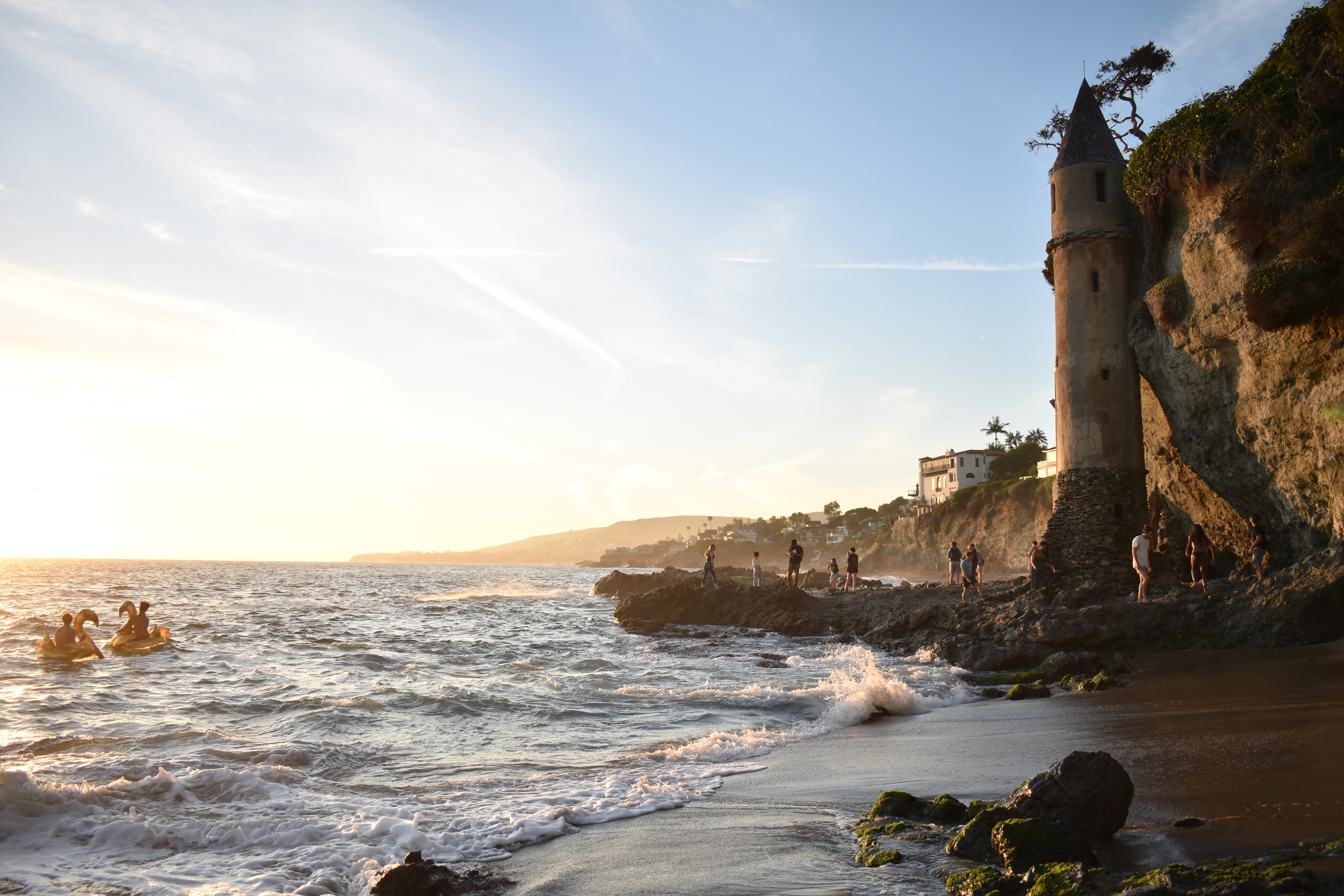
- The tower (right) in 2019

- Location within the Los Angeles metropolitan area Victoria Beach Pirate Tower (California) Victoria Beach Pirate Tower (the United States)

General information
- Architectural style: Norman
- Location: Victoria Beach, Laguna Beach, CA
- Coordinates: 33.5206°N 117.7645°W
- Year built: 1926

Height
- Height: 60 ft (18 m)

Technical details
- Material: Concrete and stone

The Victoria Beach Pirate Tower is a historic 60 ft (18 m) tower in Victoria Beach in Laguna Beach, California. It was built in 1926 and is currently locked from entry. It is inaccessible during high tide.

== History ==
The building was constructed in 1926 and was originally used as a staircase to the beach by William Edward Brown. He was a representative of California's 37th district in the state senate and had his vacation home in Laguna Beach. The tower was inspired by the castles Brown and his wife, Eleanor, had encountered during a trip to France.

Brown sold the house to a retired naval captain, Harold Kendrick, in the early 1940s. Kendrick was a pirate fanatic and invited children over for games and sea stories while dressed in pirate clothing. He held scavenger hunts and puzzles in which the winner would receive "cold cash" — a handful of refrigerated change. The house has changed owners a few times since, being bought at one point by actress Bette Midler. In 2012, a city inspector found that the tower's shingle roof was degrading and was starting to crack the exterior plaster.

== Features ==
The tower is primarily made from concrete, with its base being constructed from ocean stones. The roof is conical and shingled. There are a few rectangular window openings dispersed irregularly. The staircase inside the tower is wooden. The tower can be accessed through a staircase to the beach from the road.
