= St. Francis by-the-Sea American Catholic Church =

Historic church in California, US

- U.S. National Register of Historic Places
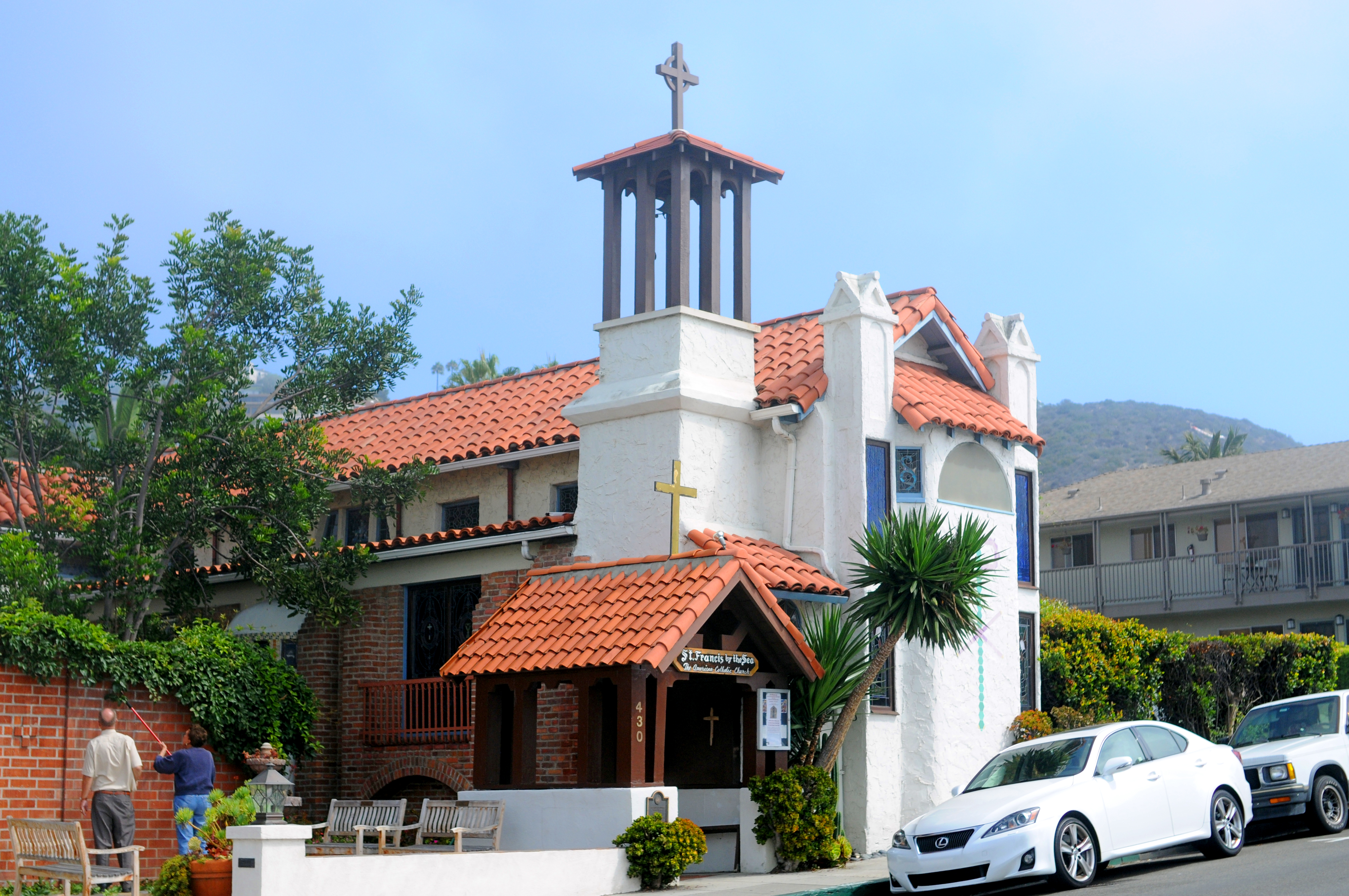

- Location within California Location within the United States
- Location: 430 Park Ave., Laguna Beach, California
- Coordinates: 33°32′31″N 117°46′55″W
- Area: 0.3 acres (0.12 ha)
- Built: 1934
- Architect: Percy Wise Clarkson
- Architectural style: Bungalow/American craftsman, Romanesque, Mediterranean Revival
- NRHP reference No.: 88000978
- Added to NRHP: June 30, 1988

St. Francis by-the-Sea American Catholic Church (St. Francis Cathedral Chapel; American Catholic Church) is a historic church in Laguna Beach, California, United States. It was built in 1934 and was added to the National Register of Historic Places in 1988. It now houses the National Sick Call Set Museum.

It was designed by English-born Percy Wise Clarkson (1875-1942), who was also the founder and first bishop of the church. He was an Episcopal priest but left the priesthood in 1928. He became a bishop in the American Catholic Church in 1933.

He also built the first Episcopal church in Laguna Beach, a small chapel which served as a summer chapel in the 1920s, also named St. Francis by-the-Sea.

== See also ==
- National Register of Historic Places listings in Orange County, California
