= Crystal Cove State Marine Conservation Area =

Marine protected area

Crystal Cove State Marine Conservation Area (SMCA) is one of a cluster of four adjoining marine protected areas that extend offshore of Newport Beach in Orange County on California’s south coast. The SMCA covers 3.45 square miles of near shore waters. Crystal Cove protects marine life by limiting the removal of marine wildlife from within its borders, including tide pools. Take of all living marine resources is prohibited except: recreational take of finfish by hook-and-line or by spearfishing, and lobster and sea urchin is allowed. Commercial take of coastal pelagic species by round haul net, spiny lobster by trap, and sea urchin is allowed.

Take pursuant to beach nourishment and other sediment management activities, and operation and maintenance of artificial structures inside the conservation area is allowed per any required federal, state and local permits, or as otherwise authorized by the department.

Take of all living marine resources from inside tidepools is prohibited. For purposes of this section, tidepools are defined as the area encompassing the rocky pools that are filled with seawater due to retracting tides between the mean higher high tide line and the mean lower low tide line.

Please see the for official details on boundaries, regulations and other information.

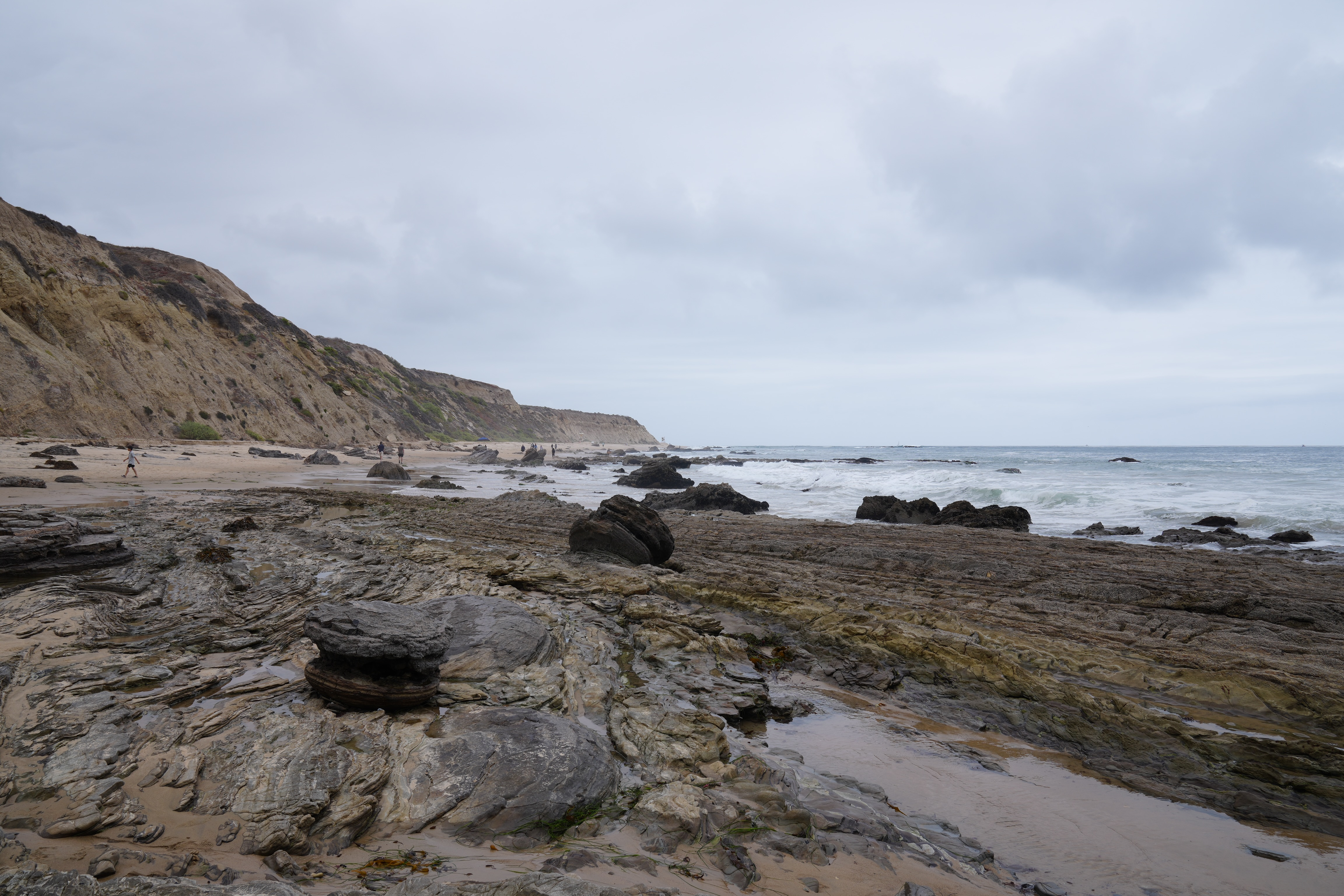
The tide pools and beach of the Crystal Cove State Marine Conservation area.

== History ==
Dana Point SMCA and its adjoining MPAs are among 36 new marine protected areas adopted by the California Fish and Game Commission in December, 2010 during the third phase of the Marine Life Protection Act Initiative. The MLPAI is a collaborative public process to create a statewide network of protected areas along California’s coastline.

The south coast’s new marine protected areas were designed by local divers, fishermen, conservationists and scientists who comprised the South Coast Regional Stakeholder Group. Their job was to design a network of protected areas that would preserve sensitive sea life and habitats while enhancing recreation, study and education opportunities.

The south coast marine protected areas went into effect in 2012.

== Geography and natural features ==
Laguna Beach SMR Boundary: This area is bounded by the mean high tide line and straight lines connecting the following points in the order listed:

1. 33°33.233′N 117°49.200′W
2. 33°30.800′N 117°49.200′W and
3. 33°30.800′N 117°45.631′W.

Laguna SMCA Boundary: This area is bounded by the mean high tide line and straight lines connecting the following points in the order listed:

1. 33°30.800′N 117°45.631′W
2. 33°30.800′N 117°49.200′W
3. 33°30.050′N 117°49.200′W and
4. 33°30.050′N 117°44.771′W.

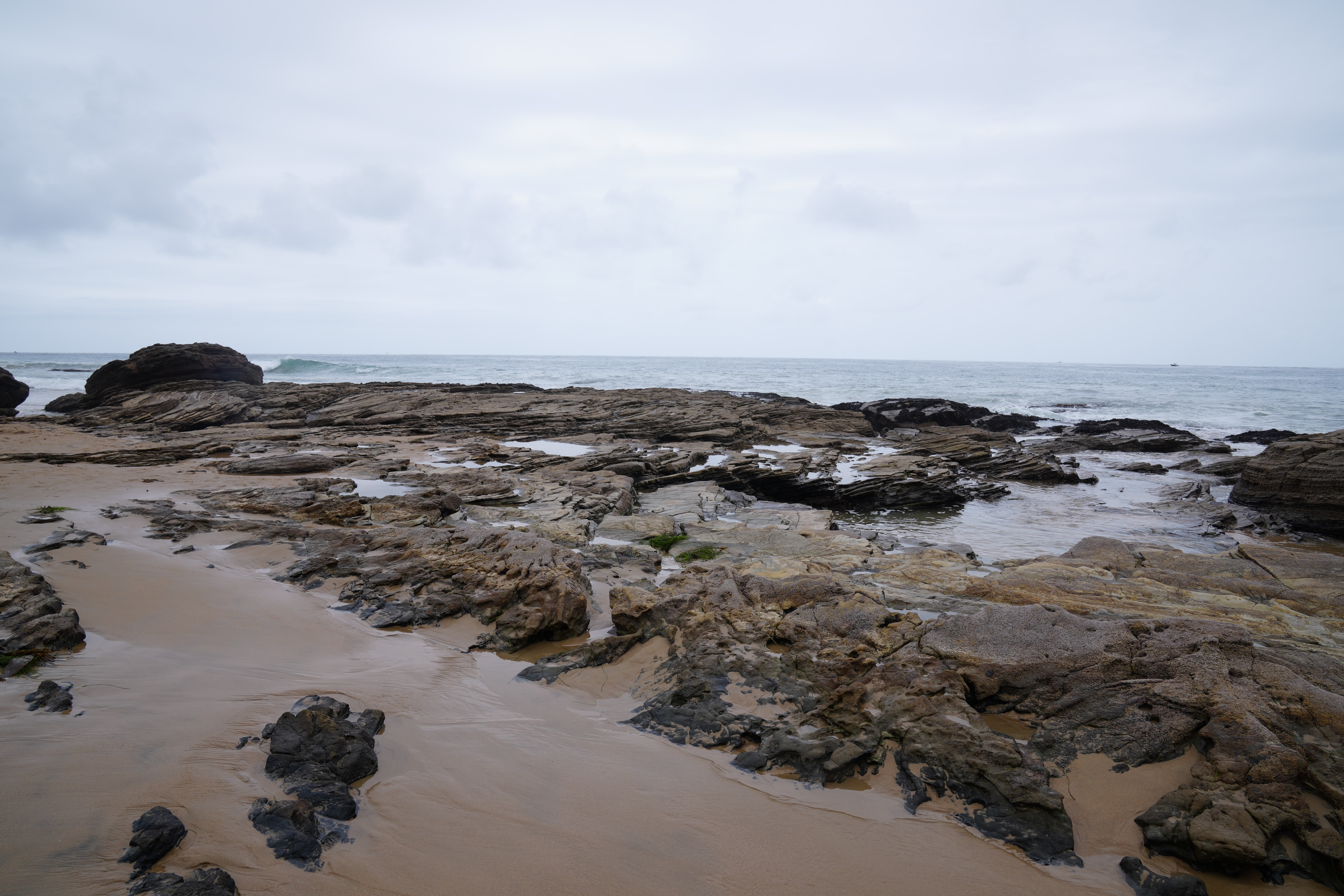
The rocky tide pools of the Crystal Cove State Marine Conservation Area.

== Habitat and wildlife ==
This MPA cluster includes examples of southern California’s world class variety of rocky and sandy habitats, including diverse rocky intertidal, shallow kelp reefs. This is an area of outstanding marine biodiversity, featuring outstanding diving, tide pooling and wildlife viewing.

== Recreation and nearby attractions ==
Nearby is Crystal Cove State Park, including Crystal Cove beach.

Tourists are often attracted to the area for its beach, hiking trails, and tide pools.

== Scientific monitoring ==
As specified by the Marine Life Protection Act, select marine protected areas along California’s south coast are being monitored by scientists to track their effectiveness and learn more about ocean health. Similar studies in marine protected areas located off of the Santa Barbara Channel Islands have already detected gradual improvements in fish size and number.

== See also ==
- Crystal Cove State Park
- Newport Beach, California
- List of marine protected areas of California
