= Crystal Cove State Park =

State park in California, United States

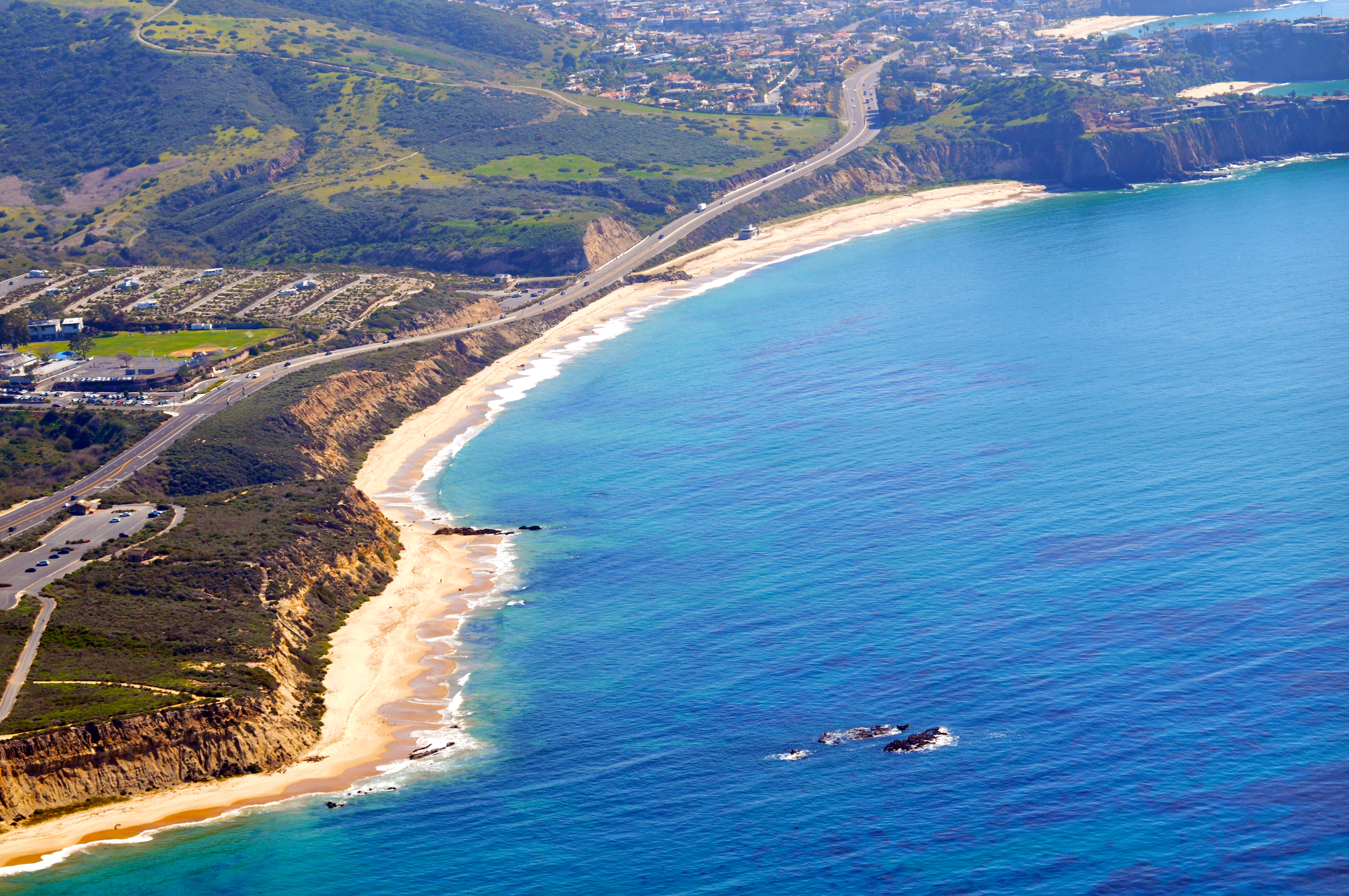
- The beach in Crystal Cove State Park

- Location within the Los Angeles metropolitan area Location within California Location within the United States
- Interactive map of Crystal Cove State Park
- Location: Orange County, California, United States
- Nearest city: Newport Beach, California
- Coordinates: 33°34′26″N 117°50′24″W
- Area: 3,936 acres (15.93 km^{2})
- Established: 1979
- Governing body: California Department of Parks and Recreation
- Website: Official website

Crystal Cove State Park is a state park of California, United States, encompassing 3.2 miles (5.1 km) of Pacific coastline, inland chaparral canyons, and the Crystal Cove Historic District of beach houses. The park is located partially in Newport Beach and partially in an unincorporated area of Orange County, and is part of the larger South Coast Wilderness area. Crystal Cove is a stretch of coastal cliffs and a beachfront cove situated between the Pacific Coast Highway and the Pacific Ocean, southeast of Newport Beach and northwest of Laguna Beach. The 3,936-acre (1,593 ha) park was established in 1979. The entire park hosts a total of three miles (4.8 km) of beaches and tide pools, a 1,400-acre marine Conservation Area (570 ha) as well as underwater park, 400 acres (160 ha) of bluffs, and 2,400 acres (970 ha) of canyons.

== History ==
Up until the arrival of the Spanish Missionaries, the region was a series of native villages built around two different natural springs. The natives were then drafted to Mission San Gabriel and Mission San Juan Capistrano, which was later known as "Rancho San Joaquin", until it went into debt and was sold in 1864 to James Irvine, a financier from San Francisco, along with three other ranchers, however in 1876, when their sheep stock began to fail from drought, poor wool, and the increasingly competitive marketplace, James Irvine bought out his partners prior to his death. His son, James Irvine II, then inherited the ranch and began to expand the production of the land by leasing it to agriculturally diverse farmers, and formed "The Irvine Company" in 1894. Being a favorite spot to James Irvine II, he allowed his friends and family as well as employees to build cottages on the area that we now refer to as Crystal Cove. As cottages began to undergo renovations and become more permanent residences, the owners were offered a choice by the Irvine Company to either move the cottages elsewhere or to hand over ownership and allow them to be leased by the company. These cottages were developed by the Irvine Company and the location was called the Crystal Cove Community. In 1927, the Irvine Company leased a portion of the area to a businessman who sold propane to coastal farmers and became a camping site named "Tyrone's Camp". Trailers replaced tent camping in the 1940s and in 1954, it was renamed El Morro. About 290 mobile home trailers on the beachfront and inland area were primary homes for some families up to four generations. In 2006, after 26 years of litigation, the California Coastal Commission, who purchased the property in 1979, evicted the tenants and demolished the El Morro Village mobile home park converting the private community into a day-use and overnight campground. The area was renovated to also include a visitors center for tourist information, dining areas along the beachfront, cultural center, museums and the Park and Marine Research Facility. The Crystal Cove Historic District, a National Register of Historic Places site, inside the park contains 46 beach cottages from the 1920s and 1930s, of which 29 have been restored. 21 of these cottages are available for rent. The house from the Bette Midler movie Beaches is located in Crystal Cove.

Crystal Cove has long been a source of inspiration for plein air painters, a type of landscape painting that originated in France. Early plein air painters documented Orange County's coastline, and Crystal Cove, in particular, with their paintings. In homage to the movement, one of the cottages at Crystal Cove is called "Painter's Cottage."

== Recreation ==
Crystal Cove is used by mountain bikers inland and scuba and skin divers underwater. The beach is popular with swimmers and surfers. Lifeguard services at Crystal Cove are provided by the California State Parks Lifeguard Service. Lifeguards patrol the beach year-round while lifeguard towers are staffed roughly Memorial Day weekend through Labor Day weekend. The offshore waters are designated as a Marine Conservation area as well as a 1,140-acre (460 ha) underwater park. Visitors can explore tidepools and sandy coves.

In addition to the beach, the park has 2,400 acres (970 ha) of undeveloped woodland inland of the coast highway, which is popular for hiking and horseback riding. The park has a total of 17 different trails.

The grounds are also available for camping. There are 34 different lots spread across the 3 designated backpacking camping areas, including the Upper Morro, Lower Moro & Deer Canyon campsites. None are accessible by car, only by hike, and are for up to 4 people per site. No pets are allowed. No fires are allowed in the backcountry campsites.

== Wildlife of Crystal Cove State Park ==
Crystal Cove State Park has a registered 180 different species of birds that can be observed throughout the entire year, seasonally, or a few times per year. Some of the birds seen regularly include the Turkey vulture, Mourning dove, Ring-billed gull, the Common raven, the Greater roadrunner, Quail and the House sparrow. Along with registered birds, there are roughly 26 registered reptiles of Crystal Cove State Park, and 10 of which are commonly seen by visitors. These include the California legless lizard, Arboreal salamander, Pacific tree frog, Red diamond rattlesnake, Pacific gopher snake, Southern Pacific rattlesnake, California kingsnake, Side-blotched lizard, Western fence lizard, and the Coast horned lizard.

== Gallery ==
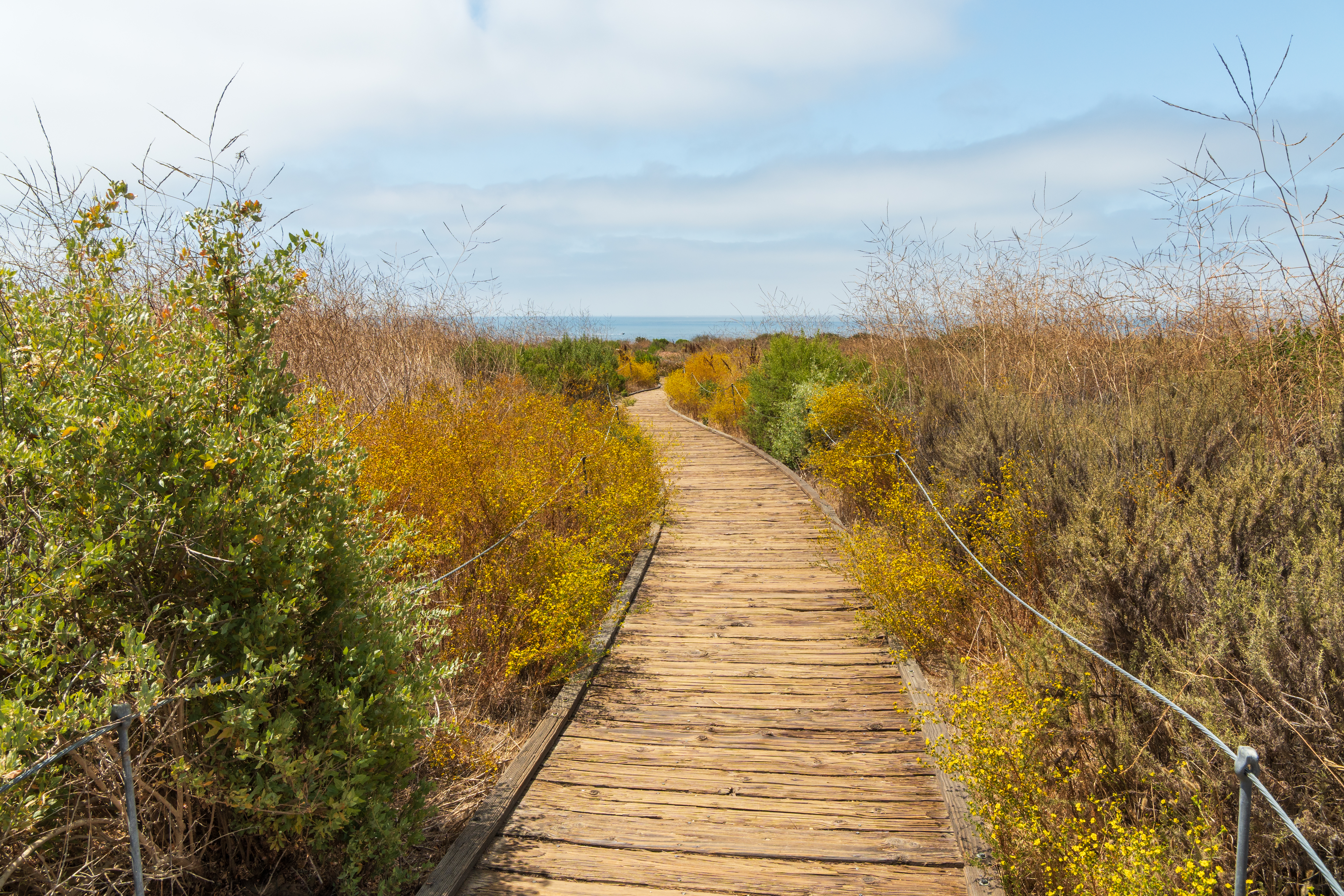

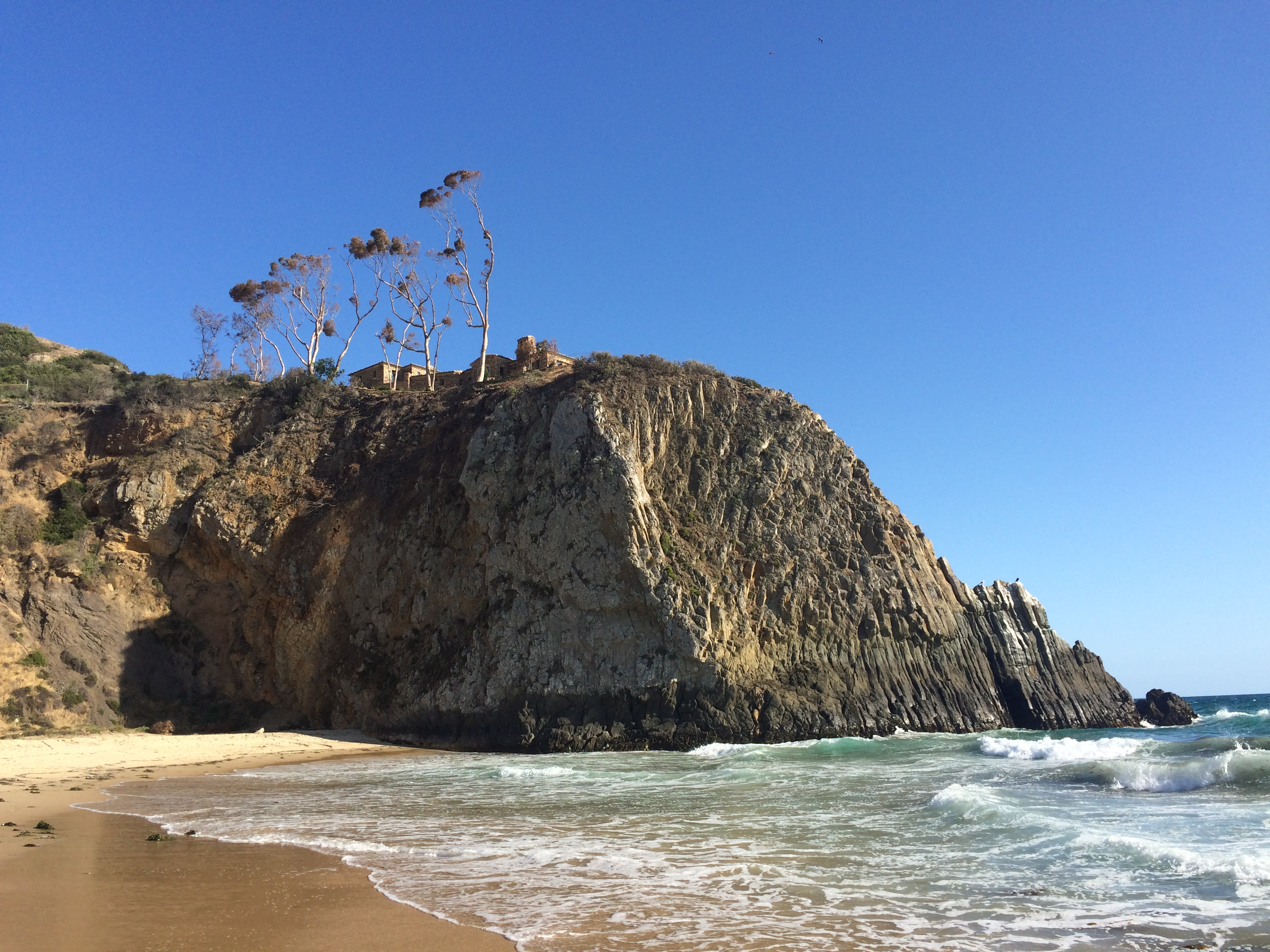

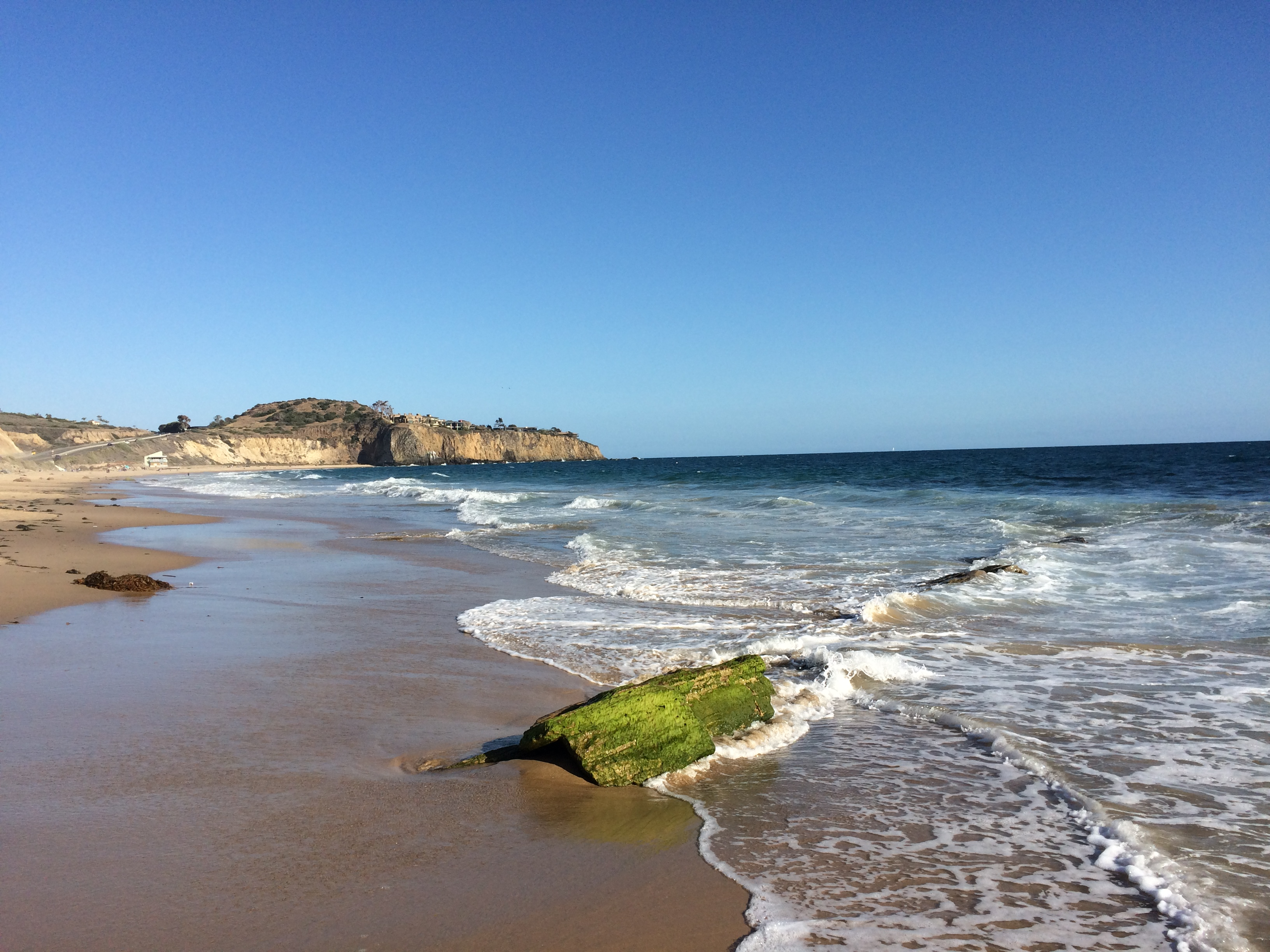

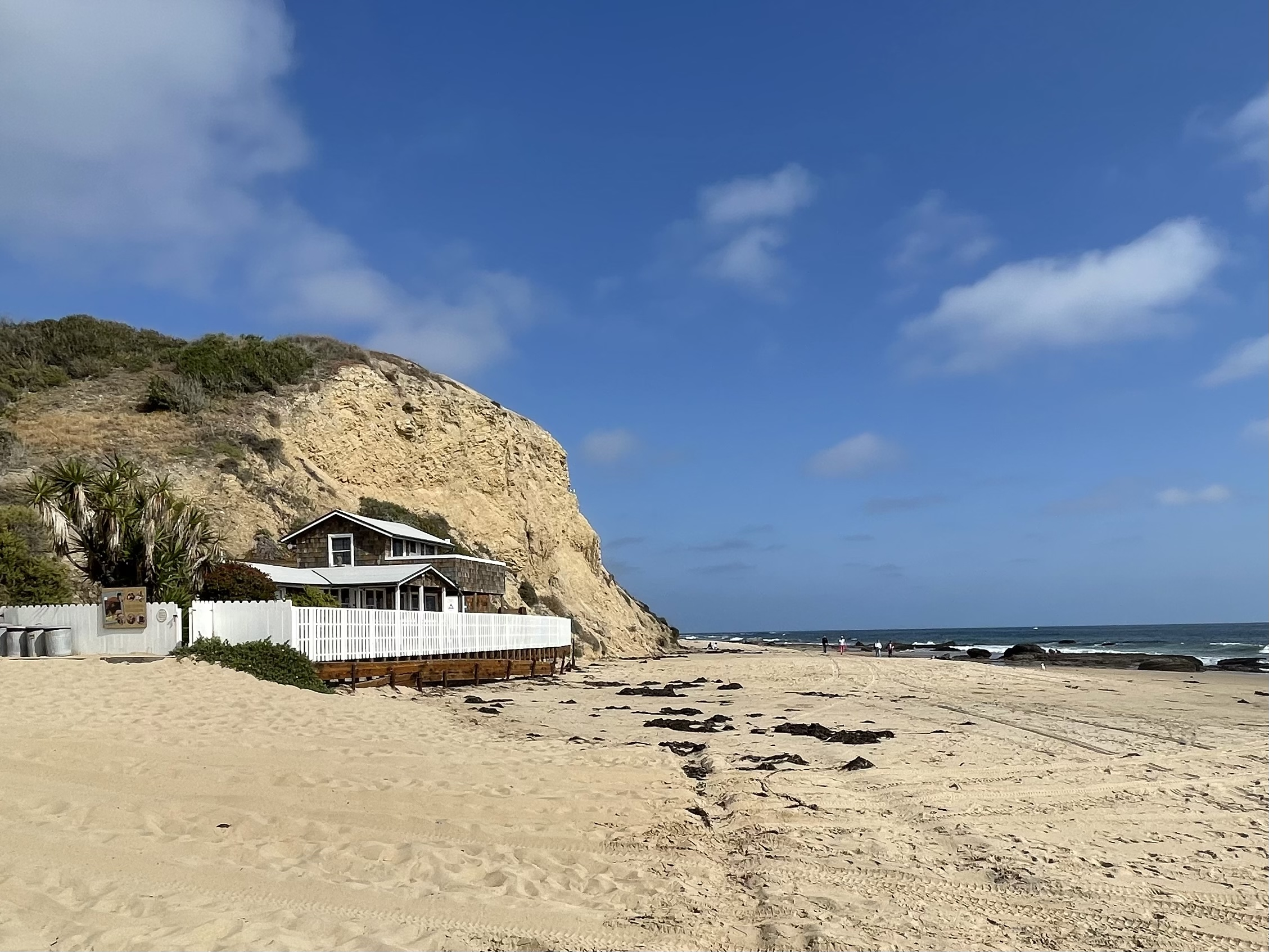

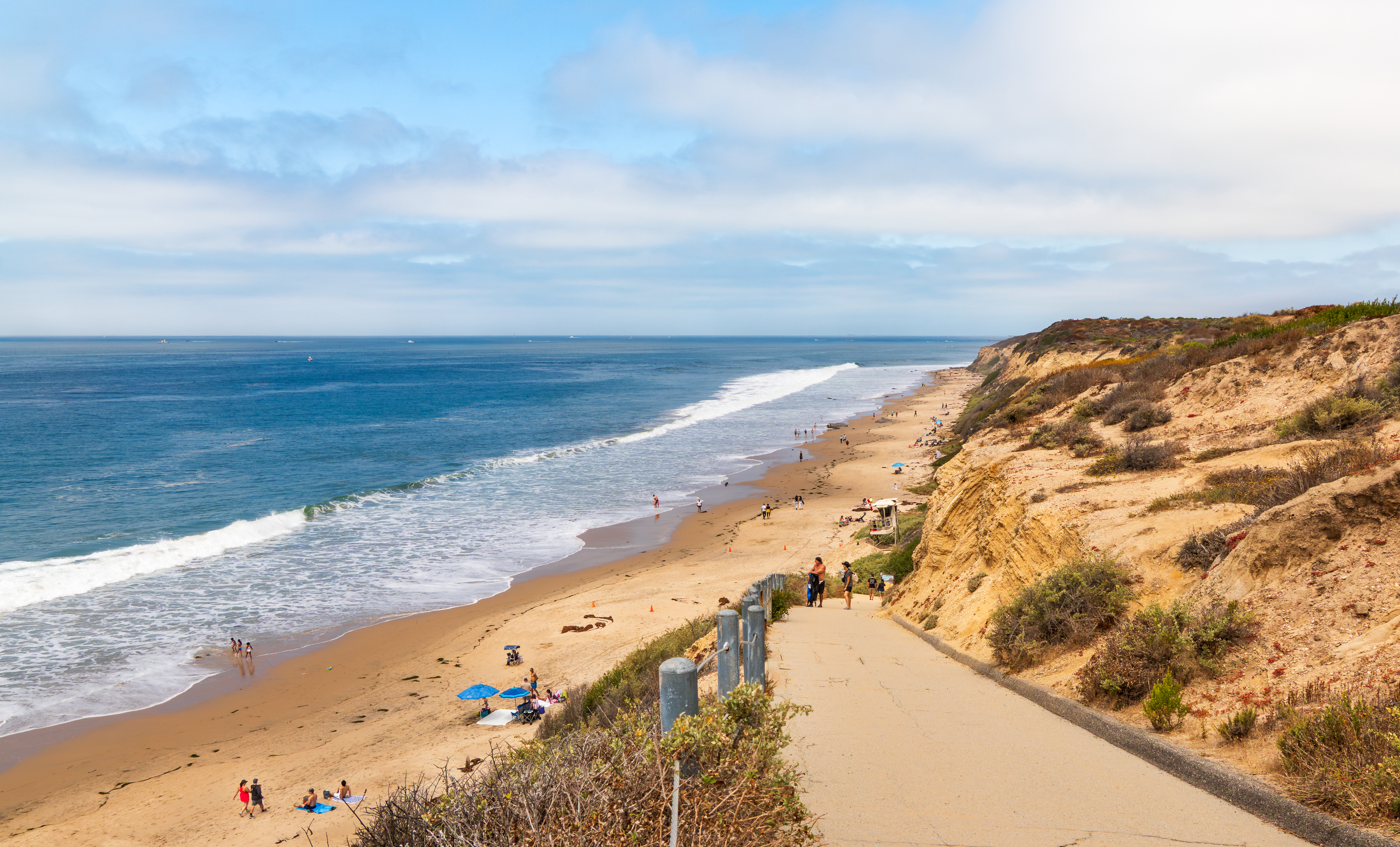

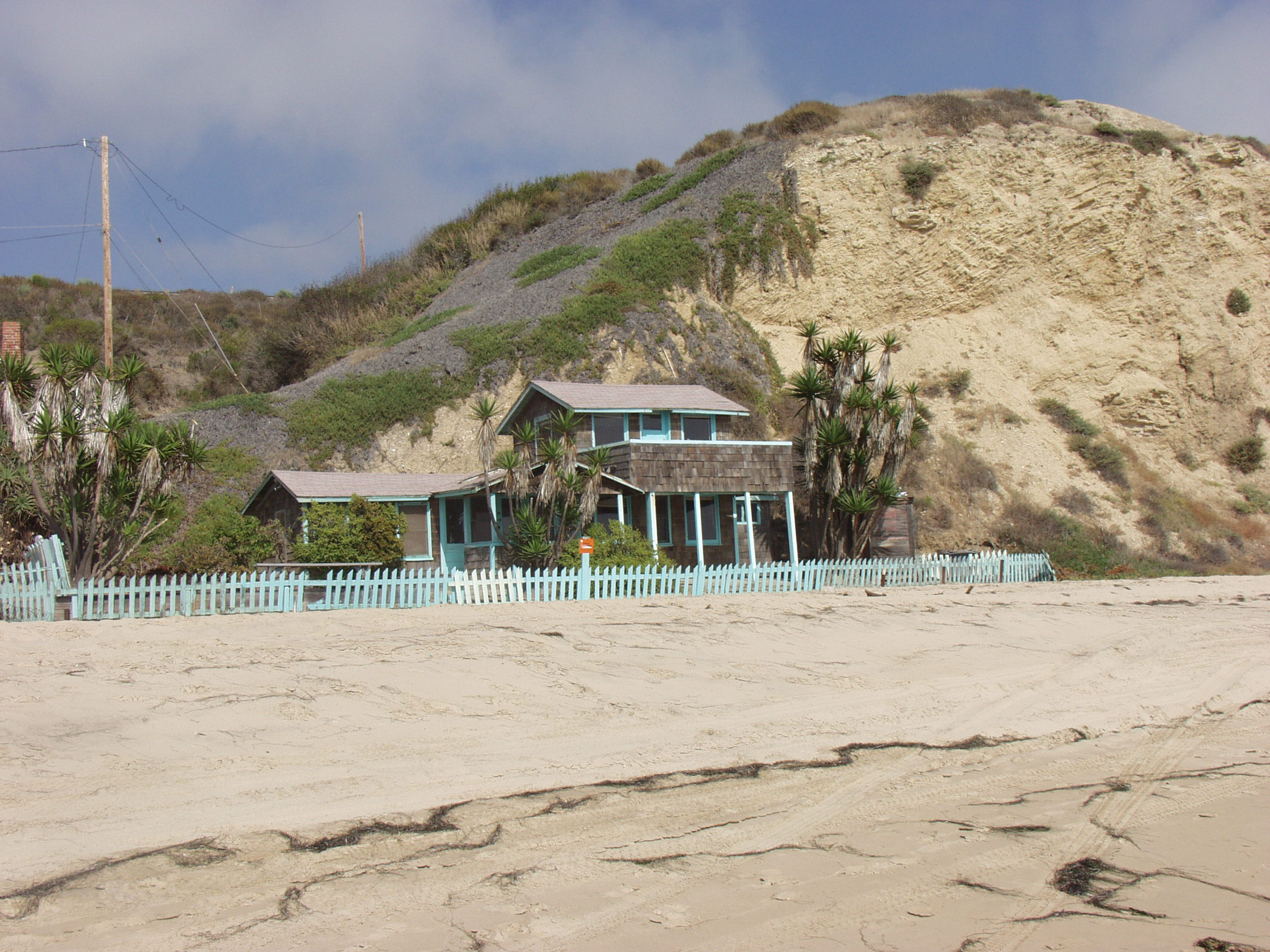

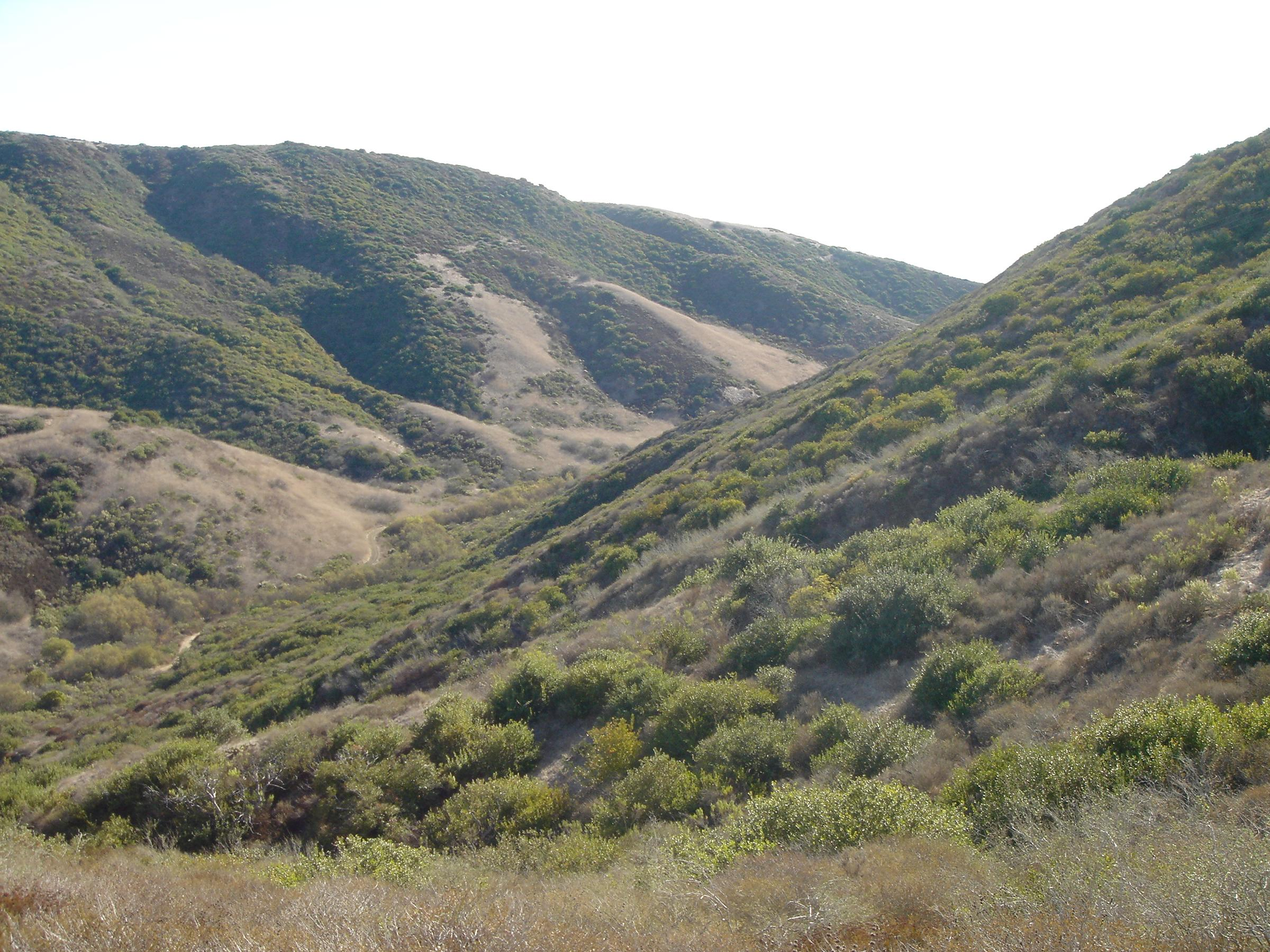

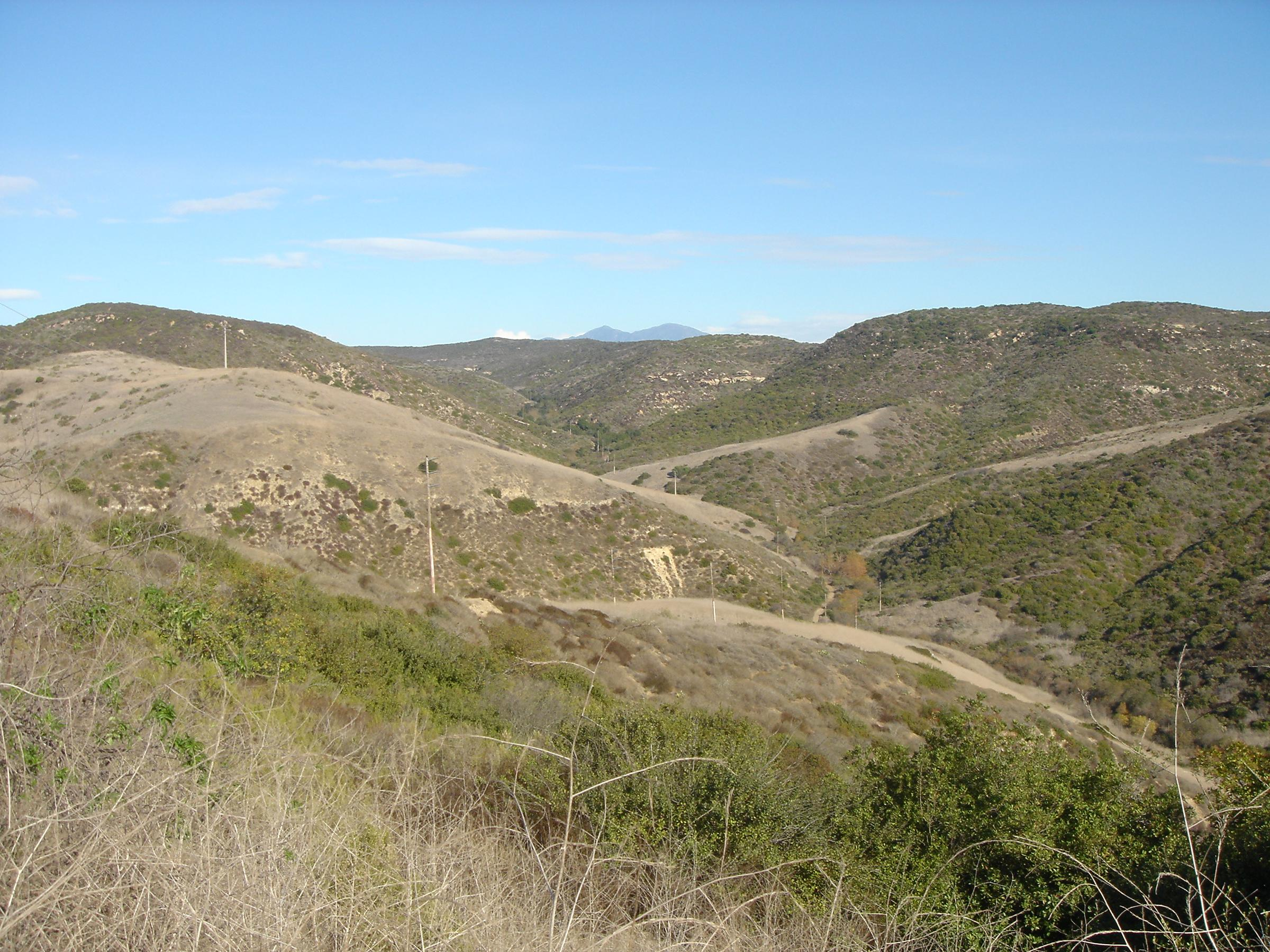

== See also ==
- Crystal Cove State Marine Conservation Area
- List of beaches in California
- List of California state parks
