= Crystal Cove Historic District =

Historic district in California, United States

- U.S. National Register of Historic Places
- U.S. Historic district
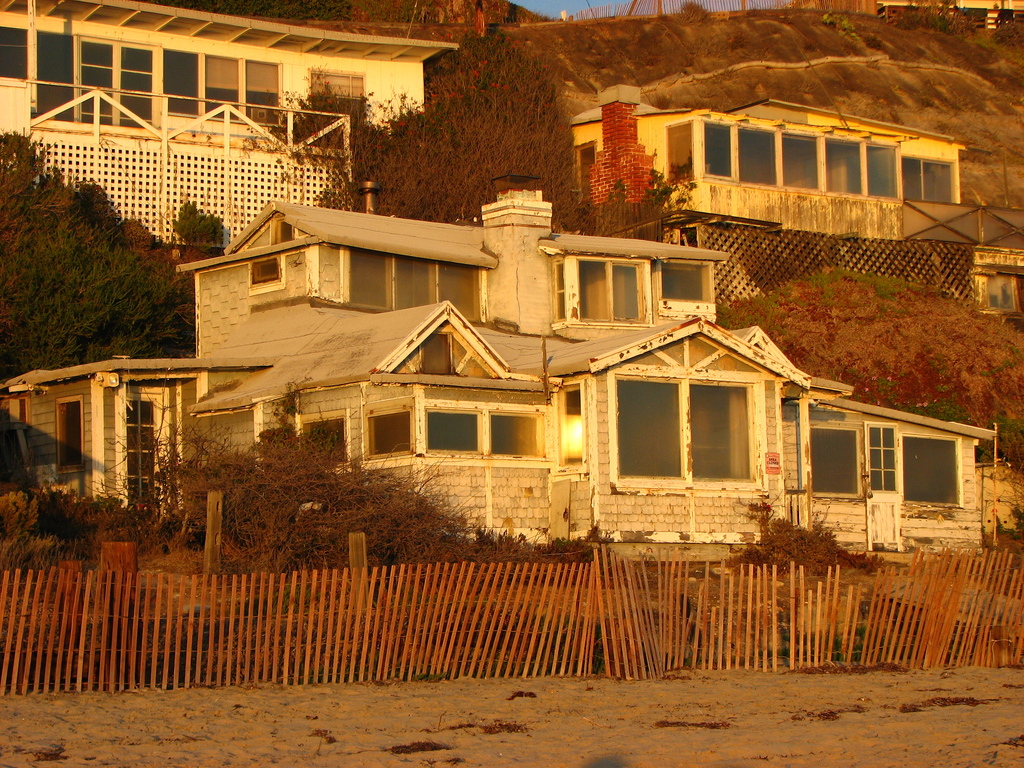

- Location within California Location within the United States
- Nearest city: Newport Beach, CA
- Built: 1924
- NRHP reference No.: 79000514

California Historical Landmark
- Reference no.: 1050
- Added to NRHP: June 15, 1979

The Crystal Cove Historic District is a part of the Crystal Cove State Park located in Newport Beach, California. It is listed on the National Register of Historic Places encompassing 12.3 acres (50,000 m^{2}) along the Southern California coast. It was listed on the National Register not only because of its significance but also because of the 46 cottages located there which were built in the 1920s and 1930s. These cottages are perfect examples of Southern California coastal development in the early 20th century and were preserved by the Crystal Cove Conservancy Alliance. Since the restoration, the cottages have been open to the public for overnight stays.

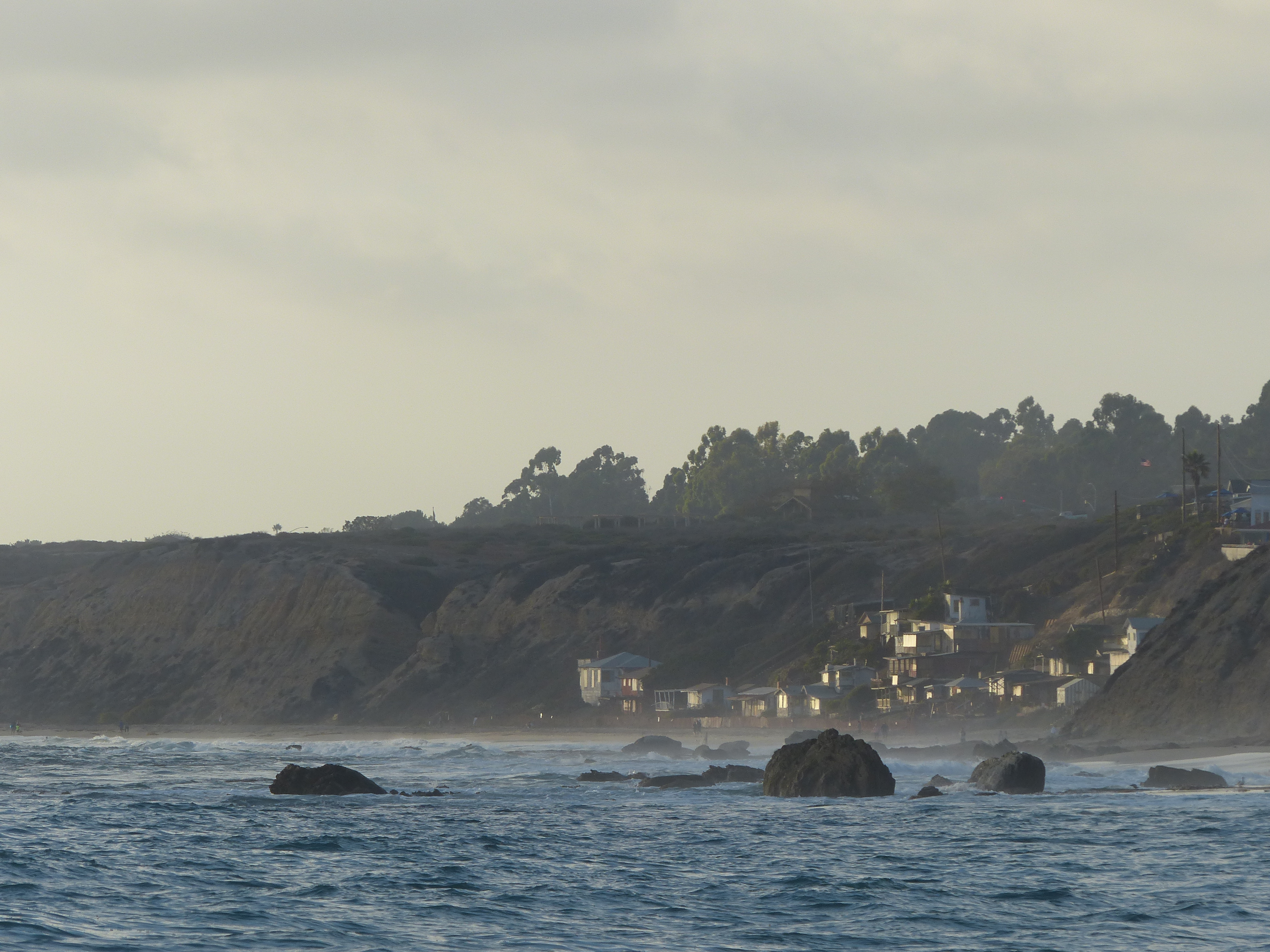
Historic wooden house in the countryside

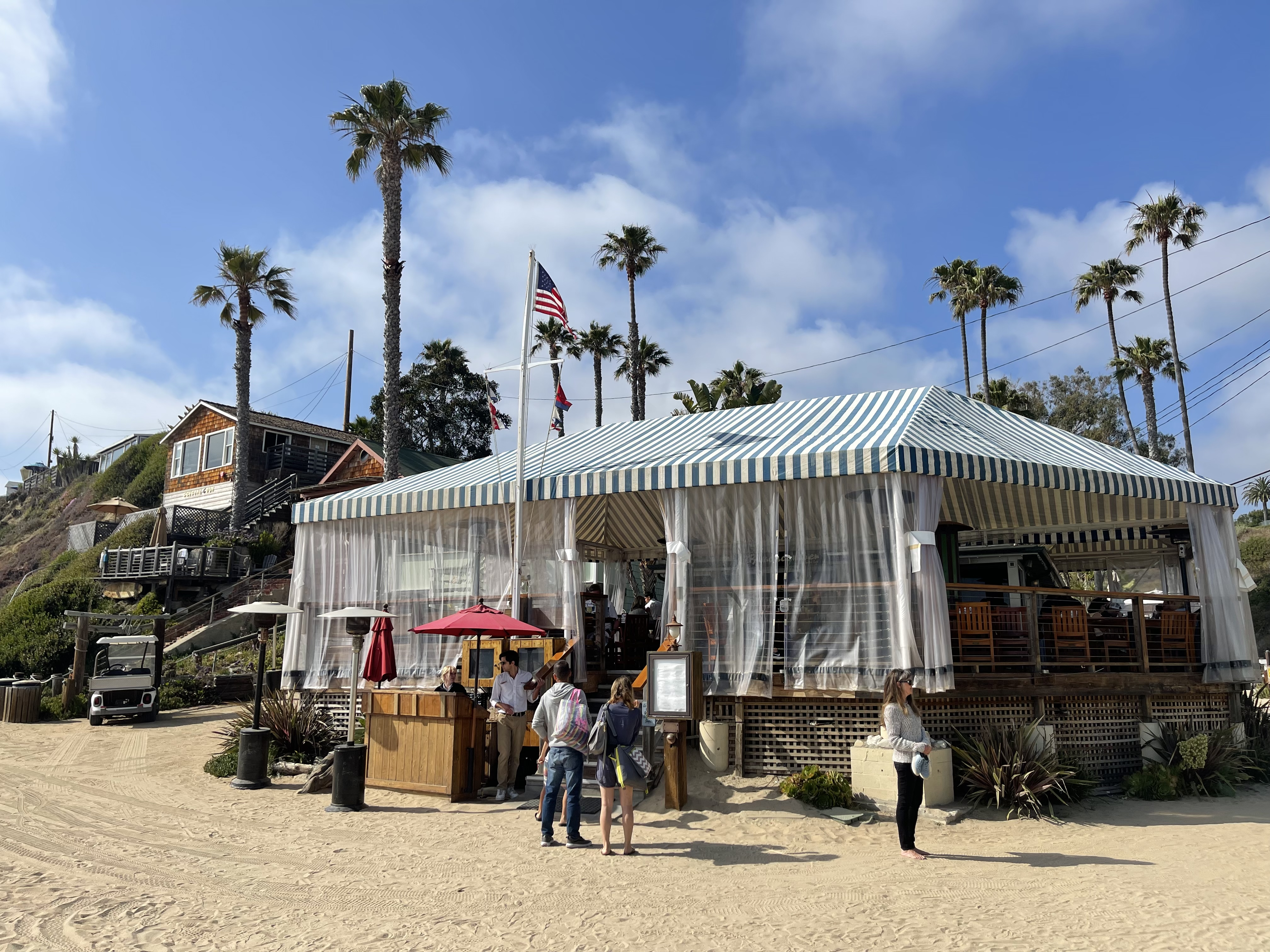
The Crystal Cove Historic District Beachcomber Cafe.

The historic district features the Crystal Cove Shake Shack and the Beachcomber at Crystal Cove restaurants. The Crystal Cove Conservancy is now working on restoring the North Beach cottages.

A resident of the cottages, Martha Padve, was highly involved in a long-running case to list Crystal Cove on the National Register and to fight the State of California over tenancy matters.

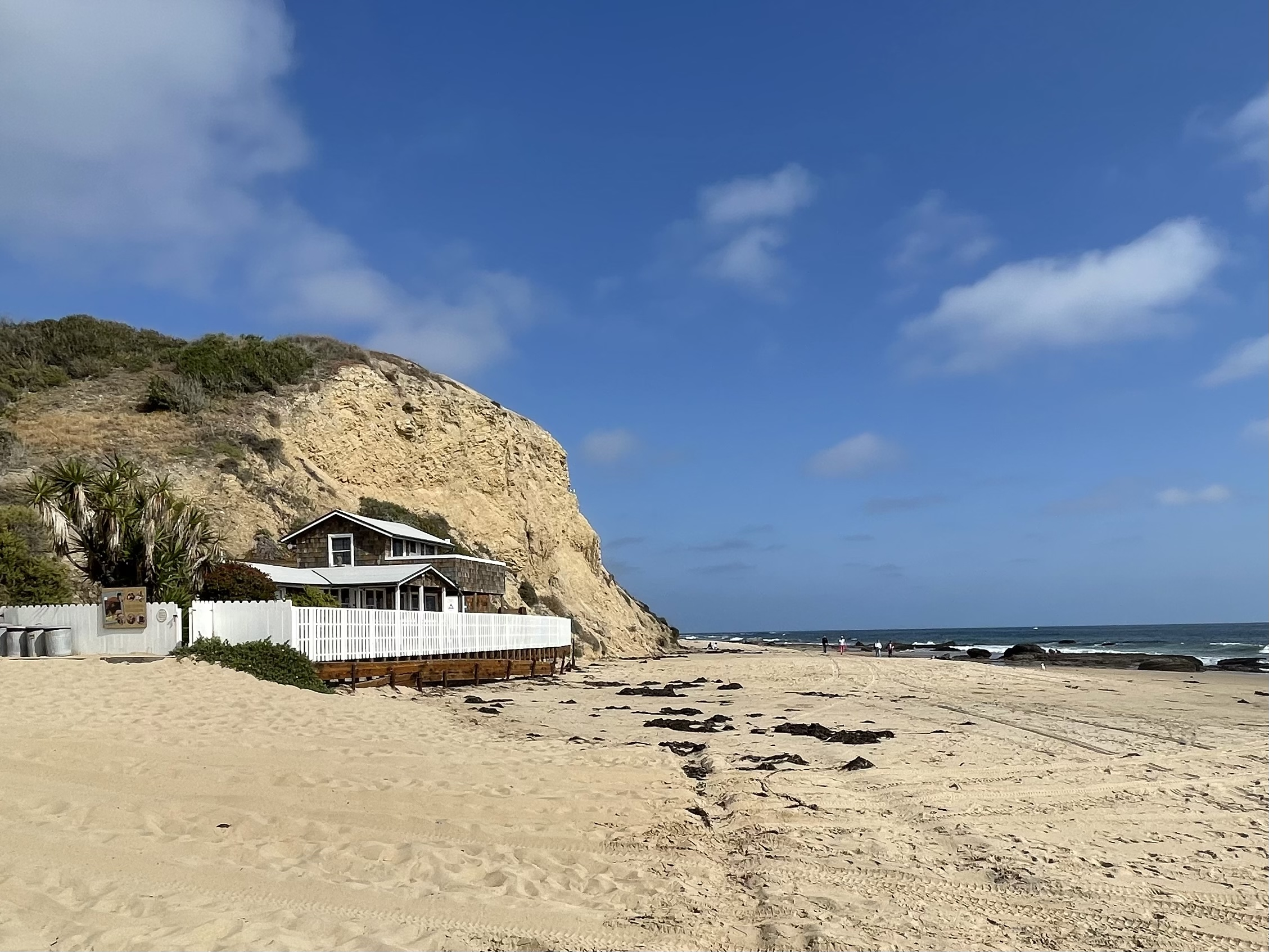
The southern Crystal Cove Historic District beach cottage number 13.

The cottages at Crystal Cove were first built by the Irvine Company and were owned by movie directors and producers. Many movies have been filmed here, including Treasure Island (1918) and Beaches (1988). Many of the cottages are currently available for public vacation rentals. The district also remains a popular location for the film industry. The main cottage featured in Beaches is currently being used as a homage to Crystal Cove's Hollywood past where visitors can learn about the different movies filmed in Crystal Cove.

In 2015, Crystal Cove Alliance was featured, along with other organizations, in Laguna Beach Eco Heroes, a 30-minute documentary by The My Hero Project. The efforts of the Laguna Canyon Foundation, ECO Warrior, Laguna Bluebelt, Nancy Caruso, One World One Ocean, Pacific Marine Mammal Center, Wyland, and Zero Trash Laguna were also highlighted in the documentary.

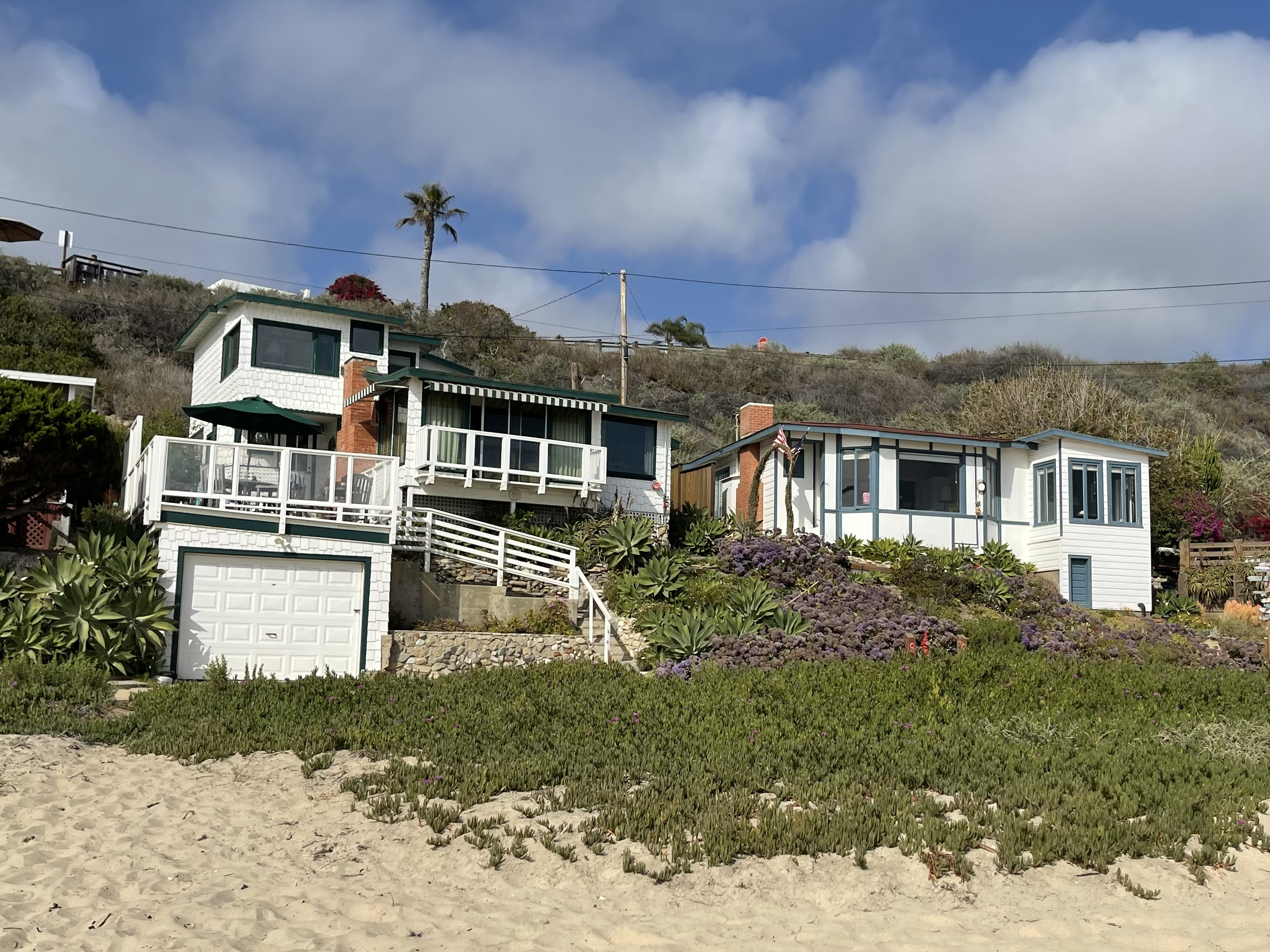
Crystal Cove Historic Beach Cottages.

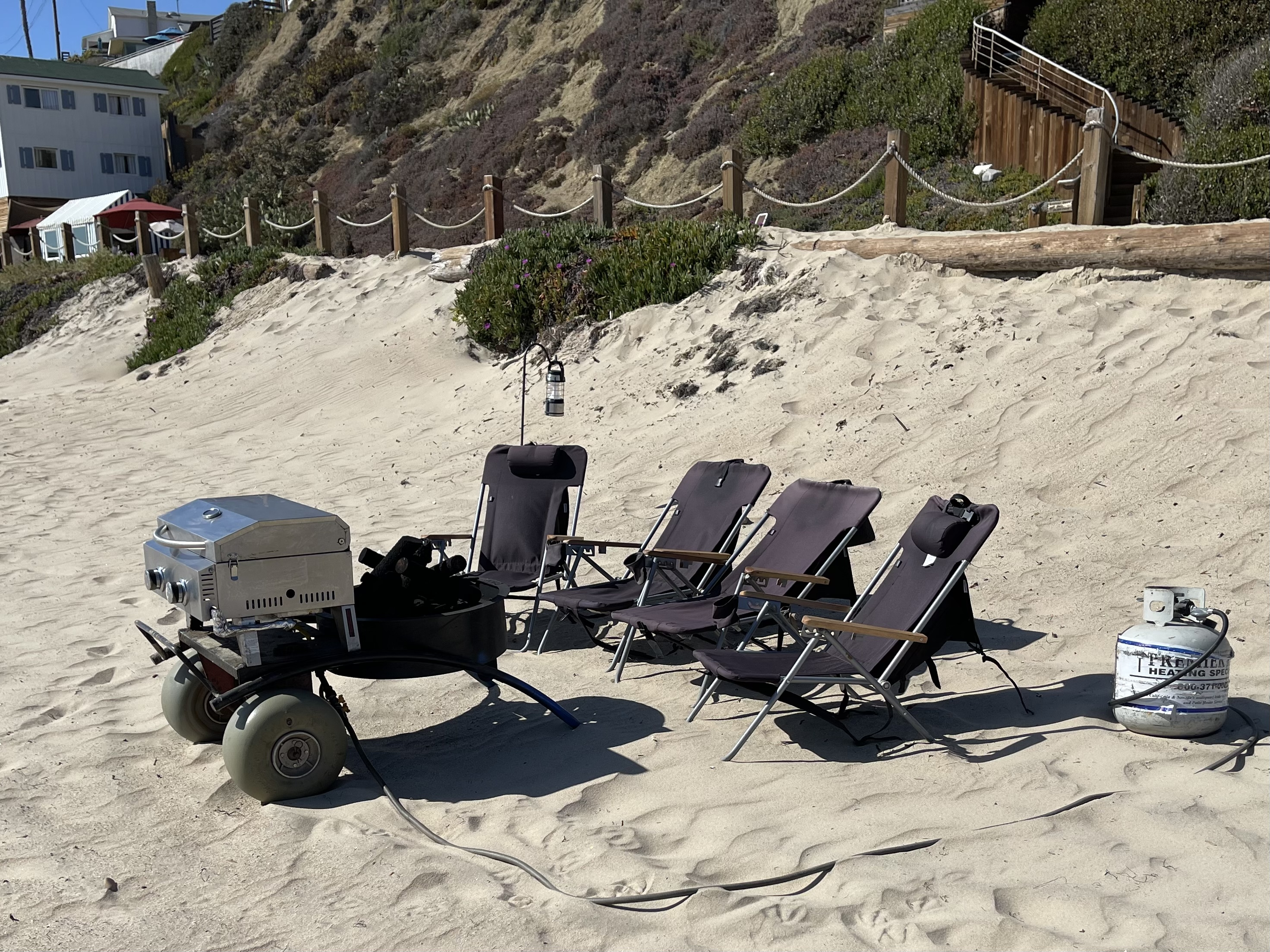
A gas canister powered campfire with beach chairs available for rent at the Crystal Cove Historic District.
