= Cape Liptrap =

Point in Victoria, Australia

Coordinates: 38.900°S 145.922°E

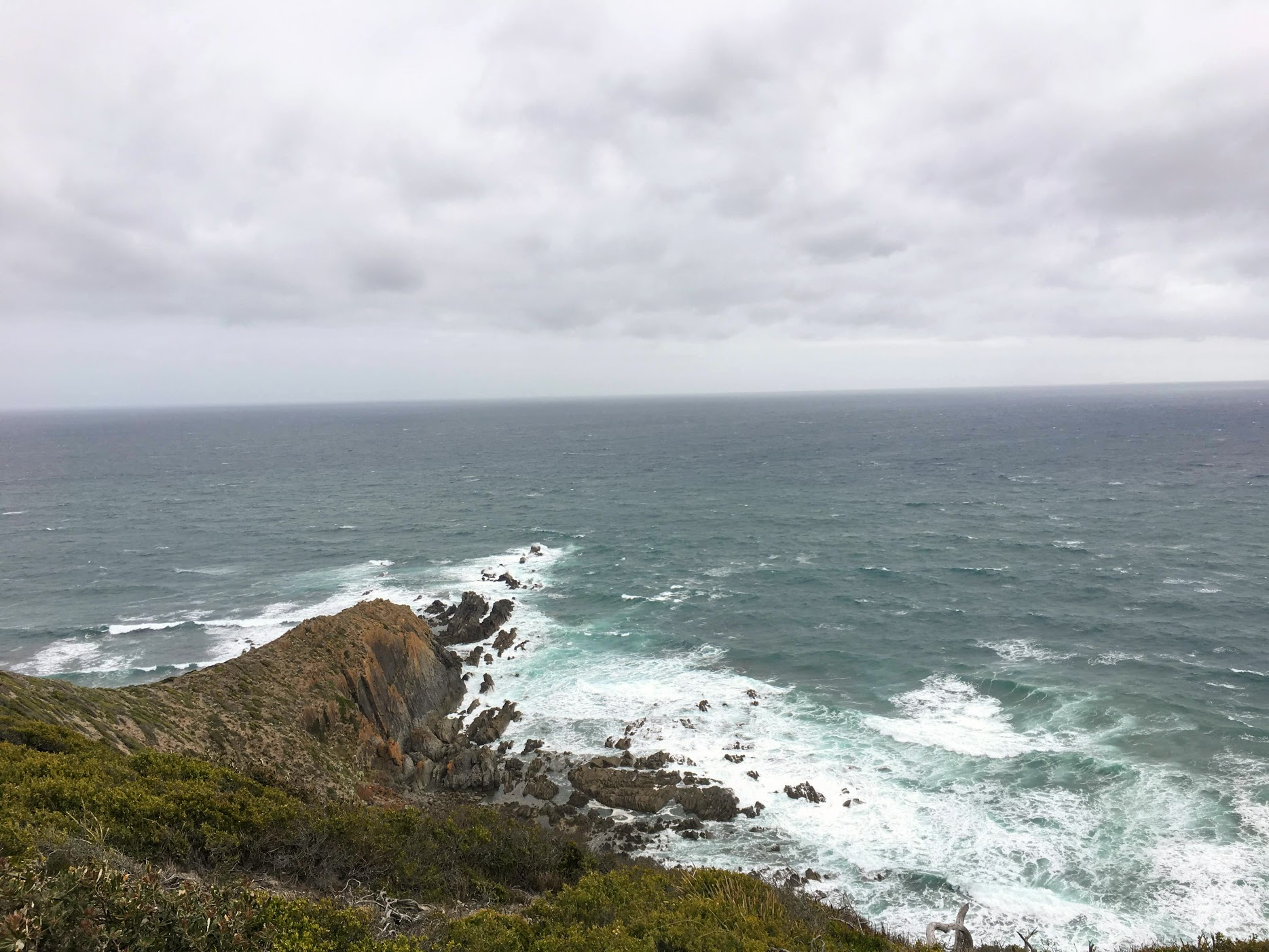
Cape Liptrap, Victoria looking over Bass Strait.The lighthouse is to the near south.

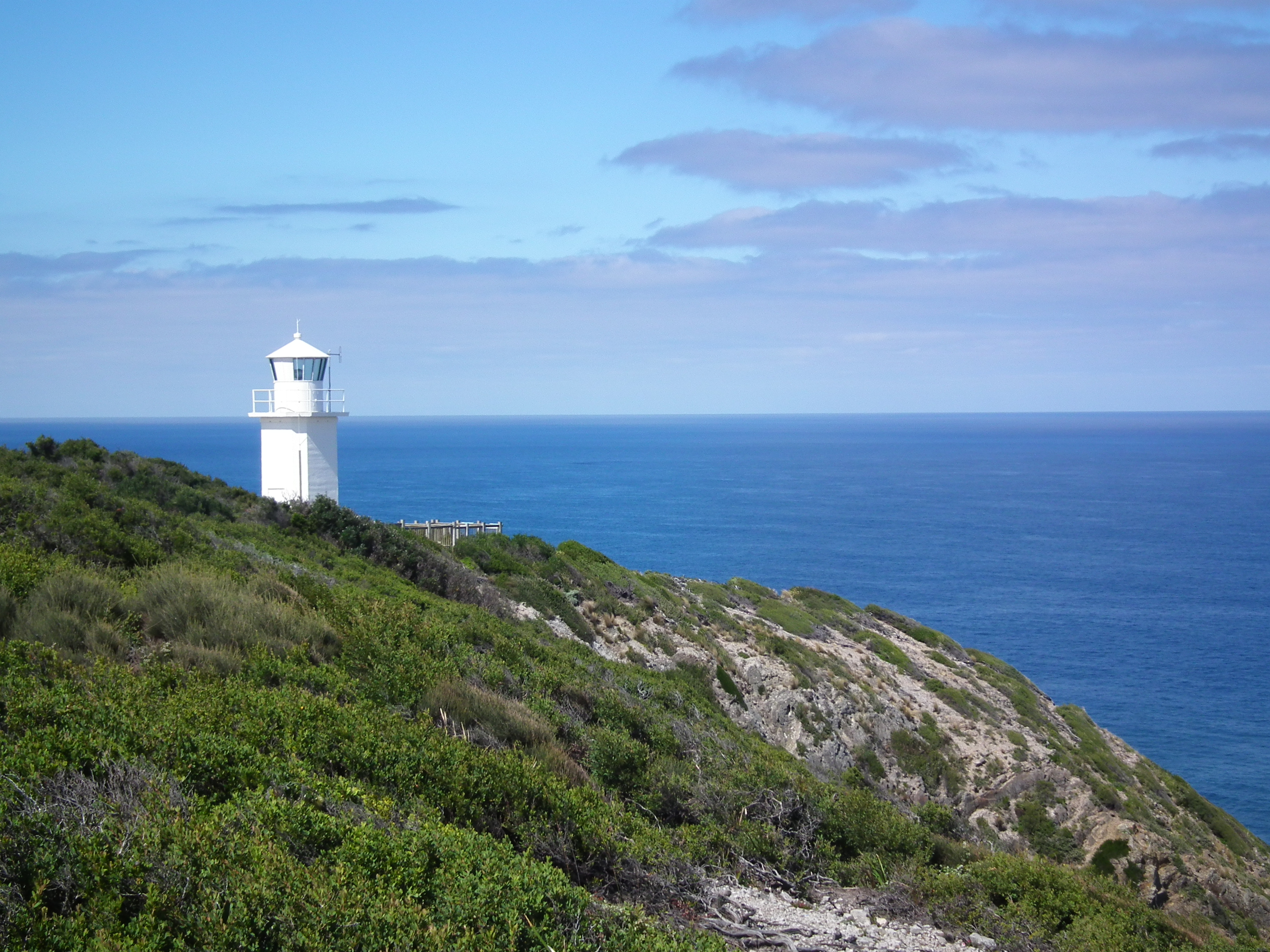
Cape Liptrap Lighthouse

Cape Liptrap is located in south Gippsland, Victoria, and is a peninsula that is the extension of the Hoddle Range that runs out to sea in a southwesterly direction. With a latitude of 38° 53' 60" S it the second most southerly point on the Australian mainland, just south of Cape Otway which lies to the west. Wilsons Promontory, the most southerly point, sits to the southeast separated from Cape Liptrap by Waratah Bay.

It was sighted by Lieutenant James Grant on 9 December 1800 from the survey brig HMS Lady Nelson and named after Grant's friend John Liptrap.

Cape Liptrap sits high above Bass Strait with steep slopes and cliffs of folded marine sediments flanked by rock pinnacles and wave cut platforms. At the end of the peninsula is Cape Liptrap Lighthouse, which was built in 1951 in cast concrete, and is octagonal in shape.

== Nearby townships ==
To the east of Cape Liptrap are the townships of Walkerville, Sandy Point and Waratah Bay.

To the northwest are Venus Bay, the Tarwin River and the townships of Tarwin Lower, Inverloch and Wonthaggi.

== Geography ==
Waratah Bay is located approximately 200 km south east of Melbourne, Latitude 38° 54' 5" S, Longitude 145° 55' 4" E
