= Waratah (disambiguation) =

The Waratah is the genus Telopea, of shrubs native to southeastern Australia.

Waratah may also refer to:

- The plant genus Alloxylon, the tree waratahs
- Waratah, New South Wales, a suburb of Newcastle
- Waratah, Tasmania, a town in northwest Tasmania
- Waratah Bay, a bay in Victoria, Australia
- SS Waratah, a steamer that mysteriously disappeared in 1909
- The Warratahs, a country-rock band from New Zealand
- New South Wales Waratahs, a Super Rugby team
- Waratah motorcycles manufactured in Sydney
- Sydney Trains A & B sets, a type of multiple unit electric train in Sydney branded as Waratah
- Waratah (steam tug), part of the Sydney Heritage Fleet
- A type of steel fence post in New Zealand and Australia

== See also ==
- Waratah West, New South Wales, another suburb of Newcastle
- Waratah-Wynyard Council, a Local Government Area in northwest Tasmania
- Waratah Bay, Victoria, a town is southeast Victoria (Australia)
- Waratah Australian Basketball League in New South Wales
- Waratah National Park, the fictional setting for "Skippy the Bush Kangaroo"
