= Yanakie =

Yanakie may refer to:

- Yanakie Isthmus in south Gippsland, Victoria, Australia, connecting Wilsons Promontory to the mainland
- Yanakie, Victoria, a town on the isthmus
