= Frank Hill (Australian footballer) =

Australian rules footballer

Personal information
- Full name: Francis Charles Hill
- Born: 5 March 1914; Myrtleford, Victoria
- Died: 12 December 1976 (aged 62); Shallow Inlet, Victoria
- Original team: Myrtleford
- Height: 182 cm (6 ft 0 in)
- Weight: 80 kg (176 lb)
- Position: centre half back

Playing career^{1}
Years	Club	Games (Goals)
1940, 1945	South Melbourne	5 (0)
- ^{1} Playing statistics correct to the end of 1945.

Francis Charles Hill (5 March 1914 – 12 December 1976) was an Australian rules footballer who played with South Melbourne in the Victorian Football League (VFL).

== Family ==
The son of Francis Charles Hill, and Daisy Jane Hill, née Dean, Francis Charles Hill was born at Myrtleford, Victoria on 5 March 1914.

He married Adeline Mavis Garoni (1920–1965), in Myrtelford, on 10 January 1942.

== Football ==
Hill played in Myrtleford's 1936 Ovens & King Football League's premiership win and was runner up in the 1936 O&KFL best and fairest award, the Butler Medal.

Hill shared Myrtleford's senior football best and fairest award with Len Ablett in 1936.

Hill was signed by the Richmond Football Club in August, 1936 and played in the Reserves with them in 1937.

Hill returned and played in Myrtleford's losing 1938 O&KFL grand final team and he finished 4th in the O&KFL Butler Medal, with 12 votes.

Hill then played with Buffalo River Football Club in the Myrtleford Bright Football League in 1939, winning both the club and league best and fairest awards.

Hill enlisted with the Air Force in late 1939 and was playing football with the RAAF in early 1940.

Hill made his debut VFL against St. Kilda in round eight at the Lakeside Oval in 1940 and was their second best player on debut.

== Death ==
He died at Shallow Inlet, Victoria, on 12 December 1976.
