= List of places on the Victorian Heritage Register in South Gippsland Shire =

This is a list of places on the Victorian Heritage Register in the Shire of South Gippsland in Victoria, Australia. The Victorian Heritage Register is maintained by the Heritage Council of Victoria.

The Victorian Heritage Register, as of 2021, lists the following nine state-registered places within the Shire of South Gippsland:

Place name	Place #	Location	Suburb or Town	Co-ordinates	Built	State registered	Photo
Bell Point Lime Kiln	H2068	Walkerville South Road	Tarwin Lower	38.872000°S 146.003639°E	1880	13 October 2005	
Korumburra Railway Station Complex	H1571	Station Street	Korumburra	38.431000°S 145.824139°E	1907	20 August 1982	
Leongatha Secondary College	H0949	1-47 Horn Street	Leongatha	38.479083°S 145.957389°E	1914	5 June 2008	
Mirboo on Tarwin Hall	H1973	285 Mirboo South Road	Mirboo	38.468111°S 146.203000°E	1928	14 February 2002	
Notched Log Cottage	H1987	920 Nyora-Poowong Road	Poowong	38.339778°S 145.728167°E	1870	9 May 2002	
Refuge Cove	H1729		Wilsons Promontory	39.039694°S 146.468333°E	N/A	9 August 2007	
Sealers Cove Saw Mill	H2019		Wilsons Promontory	39.018722°S 146.433861°E	1853	20 March 2003	
Walkerville Lime Kilns	H2043	Bayside Drive	Walkerville South	38.858222°S 145.997139°E	1870	13 October 2005	
Wilsons Promontory Lightstation	H1842		Wilsons Promontory	39.129355°S 146.424410°E	1857	18 November 1999	
