= Mick Anthony =

Australian rules footballer

Personal information
- Full name: Michael Henry Anthony
- Born: 8 August 1894; Foster, Victoria
- Died: 3 May 1966 (aged 71); Parkville, Victoria
- Original team: Port Adelaide

Playing career^{1}
| Years | Club | Games (Goals) |
| 1920–24 | Melbourne | 52 (4) |
| 1926 | St Kilda | 2 (0) |
| Total | | 54 (4) |
- ^{1} Playing statistics correct to the end of 1926.

Michael Henry Anthony (8 August 1894 – 3 May 1966) was an Australian rules footballer who played with Melbourne and St Kilda in the Victorian Football League (VFL).

He enlisted for service in World War I in 1915, but was discharged on medical grounds after completing two months of training at Seymour.
