= List of shipwrecks in February 1853 =

The list of shipwrecks in February 1853 includes ships sunk, foundered, wrecked, grounded, or otherwise lost during February 1853.

== 1 February ==
List of shipwrecks: 1 February 1853
Ship	State	Description
Blessing	United Kingdom	The paddle tug struck a sunken wreck and sank at South Shields, County Durham.
Margaret and Grace	United Kingdom	The schooner was run down and sunk off Rathmullan, County Donegal by the steamship HMRC Seamew ( Board of Customs). Her crew were rescued by HMRC Seamew. Margaret and Grace was on a voyage from Liverpool, Lancashire to Sligo.
Mark Breeds	United Kingdom	The schooner was damaged by fire at Whitstable, Kent.
Union	United Kingdom	The ship ran aground on the Quicksands. She was on a voyage from New Orleans, Louisiana, United States to Liverpool, Lancashire. She was refloated the next day.

== 2 February ==
List of shipwrecks: 2 February 1853
Ship	State	Description
Atlantic	United Kingdom	The brig was in collision with the steamship Hunwick and sank between the West Rocks and the Gunfleet Sand, in the North Sea off the coast of Essex. Her crew were rescued. She was on a voyage from London to Hartlepool, County Durham.
Colony	United Kingdom	The ship was wrecked on the Collins Patches Reef. She was on a voyage from New Orleans, Louisiana, United States to Liverpool, Lancashire.
Jason	(United Kingdom of Great Britain and Ireland) British North America	The schooner was driven ashore on Cuttyhunk Island, Massachusetts, United States. She was on a voyage from Savannah, Georgia, United States to Saint John, New Brunswick.
Margaret	United Kingdom	The ship was driven ashore and wrecked at Malamocco, Kingdom of Lombardy–Venetia. She was on a voyage from South Shields, County Durham to Venice, Kingdom of Lombardy–Venetia.
Ocean	United Kingdom	The smack was driven ashore and wrecked at Plymouth, Devon. Her crew were rescued. She was on a voyage from Shoreham-by-Sea, Sussex to Plymouth.
Rapid	Prussia	The schooner was in collision with Symmetry (United Kingdom) and sank in Liverpool Bay off the North West Lightship ( Trinity House). Her crew were rescued. She was on a voyage from Pillau to Liverpool, Lancashire, United Kingdom.
San Nicolo	Greece	The brig ran aground on the Duncaney Reef, in the Irish Sea. She was on a voyage from Liverpool to Gibraltar. She was refloated on 4 February and taken in tow.
Sirius	United Kingdom	The ship was driven ashore at Balbriggan, County Dublin. She was on a voyage from Liverpool to Pará, Brazil.

== 3 February ==
List of shipwrecks: February 1853
Ship	State	Description
Leipzig	United Kingdom	The ship ran aground on the Long Island Sand, in the Indian Ocean. She was on a voyage from Moulmein, Burma to a British port.
Providence	United Kingdom	The schooner was wrecked on the Doom Bar. Her five crew were rescued. She was on a voyage from Neath, Glamorgan to Plymouth, Devon.
Sir Richard Jackson	United Kingdom	The ship ran aground at Bogamy Point, Isle of Bute. She was on a voyage from Greenock, Renfrewshire to Valparaíso, Chile.
William	United Kingdom	The schooner was in collision with the galiot Promethus (Netherlands) and sank in the English Channel 10 nautical miles (19 km) east of Falmouth, Cornwall. Her crew were rescued. William was on a voyage from Newport, Monmouthshire to Truro, Cornwall.

== 4 February ==
List of shipwrecks: 4 February 1853
Ship	State	Description
Alnwick Packet	United Kingdom	The ship was driven ashore at Walberswick, Suffolk. She was on a voyage from Dieppe, Seine-Inférieure, France to Blyth, Northumberland. She was refloated on 8 April and taken in to Southwold, Suffolk.
Concord	United Kingdom	The ship was driven ashore at Harwich, Essex. She was on a voyage from Alicante, Spain to Aberdeen. She was refloated and taken in to Harwich.
Emma	United Kingdom	The schooner was wrecked at Beaufort, United States. She was on a voyage from Barbados to New York, United States.
Hope	United Kingdom	The barque ran aground in Crow Sound, Isles of Scilly and became hogged. She was on a voyage from Cardiff, Glamorgan to New York, United States. She was refloated the next day and taken in to St. Mary's, Isles of Scilly.
Requin	France	The ship ran aground off Dunkirk, Nord. She was refloated.
Sadak	Ottoman Empire	The ship ran aground on the Goodwin Sands, Kent. She was on a voyage from Smyrna to London, United Kingdom. She was towed off and beached at Dumpton Gap, Kent. Sadak later floated off and sank. The wreck was subsequently dispersed by explosives.

== 5 February ==
List of shipwrecks: 5 February 1853
Ship	State	Description
Fanny Truss, and William and Richard	United Kingdom	The smack Fanny Truss was in collision with the smack William and Richard and was abandoned off St. Govan's Head, Pembrokeshire. Her crew were rescued by Georgina Jane (United Kingdom). Fanny Truss was on a voyage from Chester, Cheshire to Cardiff, Glamorgan. William and Richard was on a voyage from Gloucester to Cork. Her crew survived. One of the vessels was subsequently towed in to Milford Haven, Pembrokeshire by the steamship Trinity (United Kingdom).
Victoria	United Kingdom	The ship was wrecked on the north coast of Cuba. Her crew were rescued. She was on a voyage from Vigo, Spain to Havana, Cuba.
Zelima	France	The schooner caught fire and was beached between Dungeness, Kent and Rye, Sussex, United Kingdom, where she burnt out. Her crew were rescued. She was on a voyage from Nantes, Loire-Inférieure to London, United Kingdom.

== 6 February ==
List of shipwrecks: 6 February 1853
Ship	State	Description
Anne Sinclair	United Kingdom	The schooner ran aground on the Goodwin Sands, Kent.
Aries	United Kingdom	The full-rigged ship was destroyed by fire in the West India Docks, London. She was ready to sail for Ceylon.
Barrowgate	United Kingdom	The ship was driven ashore and damaged at Soldier's Point, near Dundalk, County Louth. She was refloated on 12 February and towed in to Dundalk.
Jane Sinclair	United Kingdom	The schooner ran aground on the Goodwin Sands, Kent.
Jane White	United Kingdom	The ship ran aground on the Brake Sand, off the coast of Kent. She was on a voyage from Hartlepool, County Durham to Dieppe, Seine-Inférieure, France. She was refloated and resumed her voyage.
Masonic	United States	The ship ran aground on the Shipwash Sand, in the North Sea off the coast of Essex, United Kingdom. She was on a voyage from Newcastle upon Tyne, Northumberland, United Kingdom to New York. She was refloated and put in to Ramsgate, Kent in a leaky condition.
Naomi	United Kingdom	The ship ran aground on the Horse Shoe Bank, in Chesapeake Bay. She was on a voyage from Liverpool, Lancashire to Baltimore, Maryland, United States. She was later refloated and taken in to Baltimore in a leaky condition.

== 7 February ==
List of shipwrecks: 7 February 1853
Ship	State	Description
Baron Haynau	Austrian Empire	The brig was driven ashore at Portstewart, County Londonderry, United Kingdom. Her crew were rescued. She was on a voyage from Londonderry to Constantinople, Ottoman Empire.
Eberdina Scherenza	Netherlands	The schooner was in collision with a British vessel and sank off Mallorca, Spain with the loss of a crew member.
Helen	United Kingdom	The sloop was driven ashore and wrecked at Bamburgh, Northumberland. Her crew were rescued. She was on a voyage from Newcastle upon Tyne, Northumberland to Leith, Lothian.
Hope	United Kingdom	The brig was destroyed by fire 30 nautical miles (56 km) north of Demerara, British Guiana. Her crew survived. She was on a voyage from Demerara to Liverpool, Lancashire.
James	United Kingdom	The ship struck the Whitby Rock and was damaged. She consequently put in to Scarborough, Yorkshire in a leaky condition.

== 8 February ==
List of shipwrecks: 8 February 1853
Ship	State	Description
Britannia	United Kingdom	The ship was driven ashore near Cape Greco, Cyprus. She was on a voyage from Genoa, Kingdom of Sardinia to Constantinople, Ottoman Empire. Britannia was consequently condemned.
Caroline Schenk	Netherlands	The ship was driven ashore on Terschelling, Friesland. She was on a voyage from Pernambuco, Brazil to Amsterdam, North Holland. She was refloated the next day.
Combinazione	Wallachia	The brig ran aground at Marsala, Sicily. Her crew were rescued. She was on a voyage from Constantinople, Ottoman Empire to Falmouth, Cornwall, United Kingdom. Combinazione broke up on 11 February.
HMS Pandora	Royal Navy	The Pandora-class brig ran aground at Manukau, New Zealand. She was on a voyage from Manukau to Onehunga.
Stormont	United Kingdom	The sloop was in collision with another vessel and was then driven ashore and wrecked on the Seaton Rocks, Northumberland.
Vrouw Wilhelmina	Netherlands	The ship was abandoned in the Dogger Bank. All on board were rescued by Haabet (Denmark). Vrouw Wilhelmina was on a voyage from Christiania, Norway to hull, Yorkshire, United Kingdom.
Vyf Gebroeders	Kingdom of Hanover	The ship was driven ashore and wrecked south of Seaham, County Durham, United Kingdom. Her crew were rescued. She was on a voyage from Bremen to Seaham.

== 9 February ==
List of shipwrecks: 9 February 1853
Ship	State	Description
Aurora	United Kingdom	The ship departed from Seville, Spain for London. No further trace, presumed foundered with the loss of all hands.
Caspian	United States	The full-rigged ship was driven ashore and wrecked in Torbay. Her crew were rescued. She was on a voyage from Charleston, South Carolina to Plymouth, Devon, United Kingdom at Havre de Grâce, Seine-Inférieure, France.
Chase	United Kingdom	The ship ran aground on the Burbo Bank, in Liverpool Bay. She was on a voyage from Liverpool, Lancashire to Greenock, Renfrewshire and Demerara, British Guiana. She was later refloated and put back to Liverpool.
Colony	United Kingdom	The ship was wrecked on the Collins Patches. She was on a voyage from New Orleans, Louisiana, United States to London.
Frances	United Kingdom	The sloop was driven ashore at Sunderland, County Durham.
Goede Vertrowen	Netherlands	The ship was driven ashore near Zandvoort, North Holland. she was on a voyage from Batavia, Netherlands East Indies to Amsterdam, North Holland.
Hazard	United Kingdom	The ship was driven ashore near Ilfracombe, Devon. She was refloated and taken in to Bideford.
Hero	United Kingdom	The ship was run into by Fellowship (United Kingdom) and foundered in the North Sea off the coast of Yorkshire. Her crew were rescued by Fellowship.
Jessie	United Kingdom	The ship foundered off Luanco, Spain. Her crew were rescued. She was on a voyage from Newcastle upon Tyne, Northumberland to Gijón, Spain.
Sardinian	Kingdom of Sardinia	The bombard was wrecked near "Torre Island". She was on a voyage from Nova Scotia, British North America to "Della Guardia".
St. Thomas	Denmark	The ship was driven ashore and wrecked at Helsingør. She was on a voyage from Messina, Sicily to Helsingør.
Susannah	United Kingdom	The ship was driven ashore and wrecked at Seaham, County Durham. Her crew were rescued.

== 10 February ==
List of shipwrecks: 10 February 1853
Ship	State	Description
Adelaide	(United Kingdom of Great Britain and Ireland) Jersey	The ship was driven ashore and wrecked at Tynemouth, Northumberland. Her crew were rescued.
Anna Catharina	Denmark	The ship ran aground and capsized at Hartlepool, County Durham, United Kingdom. Her crew were rescued.
Anna Christina	Denmark	The ship ran aground and was wrecked at Hartlepool.
Cambridge	United Kingdom	The ship was driven ashore south of West Hartlepool, County Durham.
Charlotte	United Kingdom	The brig was in collision with a brigantine and foundered in the North Sea off Flamborough Head, Yorkshire with the loss of a crew member. Survivors were rescued by the brig Jane and Catherine (United Kingdom). Charlotte was on a voyage from South Shields, County Durham to London.
Claudius	Denmark	The schooner ran aground on the Steilsand, in the North Sea. She was on a voyage from Sunderland, County Durham, United Kingdom to Hamburg. She floated off on 14 February and was taken in to Cuxhaven.
Heron	United Kingdom	The ship was wrecked on the Heaps Sandbank. Her crew survived.
Ida Gezina	Netherlands	The galiot was wrecked in Donegal Bay with the loss of two of her crew. She was on a voyage from Calais, France to Sligo, United Kingdom.
Jane White	United Kingdom	The ship ran aground on the Brake Sand, off the coast of Kent. She was on a voyage from Hartlepool, County Durham to Dieppe, Seine-Inférieure, France.
John	United Kingdom	The sloop struck the Bull Float, in the Humber and sank. Her crew were rescued. She was on a voyage from Newcastle upon Tyne, Northumberland to Dunkirk, Nord, France.
Maria	United Kingdom	The galiot was driven ashore and wrecked near Huttoft, Lincolnshire. Her crew were rescued. She was on a voyage from South Shields to Spalding, Lincolnshire.
Susannah	United Kingdom	The ship was driven ashore and wrecked at Seaham, County Durham. Her crew were rescued.
Wilhelmina Jeltina	Netherlands	The schooner was wrecked 2 nautical miles (3.7 km) from Sanlúcar de Barrameda, Spain. She was on a voyage from Liverpool, Lancashire, United Kingdom to Seville, Spain.
William	United Kingdom	The schooner was in collision with the galiot Anna Metta (Hamburg) and sank off Falmouth, Cornwall. Her crew were rescued by Anna Metta. William was on a voyage from Truro, Cornwall to a Welsh port.

== 11 February ==
List of shipwrecks: 11 February 1853
Ship	State	Description
Antelope	Norway	The ship was driven ashore and wrecked on Papa Westray, Orkney Islands, United Kingdom with the loss of four of her nine crew. She was on a voyage from Dublin, United Kingdom to Bergen.
Caroline Schink	Netherlands	The ship was driven ashore. She was on a voyage from Pernambuco, Brazil to Amsterdam, North Holland.
Frederick and Elvine	Denmark	The ship was driven ashore near Fredrikshavn. She was on a voyage from Odense to Hull, Yorkshire, United Kingdom. She was refloated and taken in to Fredrikshavn.
Perle	France	The ship was wrecked on the Hogsty Reef. She was on a voyage from Port-au-Prince, Haiti to Havre de Grâce, Seine-Inférieure.
Return	United Kingdom	The brig struck a sunken wreck in the Swin, off the coast of Essex and foundered. Her crew were rescued by the Barking Smack Eliner (United Kingdom).
St. Andrew	United Kingdom	The sloop was driven ashore in Deer Sound, Orkney Islands. She was on a voyage from Kirkwall, Orkney Islands to Newcastle upon Tyne, Northumberland.

== 12 February ==
List of shipwrecks: 12 February 1853
Ship	State	Description
Anna Dorothea	Norway	The derelict ship was towed in to A Coruña, Spain.
Betsey	United Kingdom	The ship was driven ashore on Salt Island, Anglesey. She was on a voyage from Holyhead, Anglesey to Cardiff, Glamorgan. She was refloated on 23 February and towed in to Holyhead.
Britannia	United Kingdom	The ship was driven ashore and wrecked at Constantinople, Ottoman Empire.
Hester	United Kingdom	The ship struck the Cleopatra Rock. She was on a voyage from Cardiff to Liverpool, Lancashire. She put in to Holyhead in a leaky condition.
John	United Kingdom	The ship was in collision with the Bull Float and sank in the Humber. Her crew were rescued. She was on a voyage from Newcastle upon Tyne, Northumberland to Dunkirk, Nord, France.
Premier	United Kingdom	The ship ran aground at Youghal, County Cork. She was on a voyage from Messina, Sicily to Liverpool.

== 13 February ==
List of shipwrecks: 13 February 1853
Ship	State	Description
Eclipse	United Kingdom	The schooner was abandoned off Cape Finisterre, Spain. Her crew were rescued by the steamship Genova (United Kingdom). Eclipse was on a voyage from Ancona, Papal States to Amsterdam, North Holland, Netherlands. She was towed in to Lisbon, Portugal on 28 February by Estrella (Portugal).
Esther	United Kingdom	The ship struck rocks and was damaged. She was on a voyage from Cardiff, Glamorgan to Liverpool, Lancashire. She put in to Holyhead, Anglesey in a leaky condition.
Frances and Ann	(United Kingdom of Great Britain and Ireland) Jersey	The schooner was severely damaged by fire at Jersey.
Mary	United Kingdom	The ship was wrecked on Inchcolm. Her three crew were rescued. She was on a voyage from Wisbech, Cambridgeshire to Port Dundas, Renfrewshire.
Marys	United Kingdom	The ship ran aground on the Black Tail Sand, in the Thames Estuary. She was refloated and taken in to Gravesend, Kent.
Nouvelle Marie	France	The ship was driven ashore at the mouth of the Gironde. Her crew were rescued. She was on a voyage from Bordeaux, Gironde to Bayonne, Basses-Pyrénées.
Venus	United Kingdom	The ship ran aground on the Black Tail Sand. She was refloated.

== 14 February ==
List of shipwrecks: 14 February 1853
Ship	State	Description
Adelaide	United Kingdom	The ship arrived at Mauritius on fire and was scuttled. She was on a voyage from Adelaide, Victoria to London.
Humboldt	United States	The paddle steamer ran aground at Havre de Grâce, Seine-Inférieure, France. She was on a voyage from Havre de Grâce to New York. She was refloated and put back to Havre de Grâce.
Lady of the Lake	United Kingdom	The sloop was driven ashore and severely damaged at North Berwick, Lothian. Her crew were rescued.
Maitre Jacques	France	The ship was driven ashore at Port-en-Bessin, Calvados. Her crew were rescued. She was on a voyage from Courcelles to Port-en-Bessin.
Oberon	United Kingdom	The ship struck the Skerries, off Start Point, Devon. She was on a voyage from Hartlepool, County Durham to Naples, Kingdom of the Two Sicilies. She put in to Plymouth, Devon in a leaky condition.

== 15 February ==
List of shipwrecks: 15 February 1853
Ship	State	Description
Courier	United Kingdom	The ship capsized at Liverpool, Lancashire. She was righted the next day.
Queen Victoria	United Kingdom	Queen Victoria. The paddle steamer was wrecked at Howth Head, County Dublin with the loss of about 83 lives. There were seventeen survivors. She was on a voyage from Liverpool to Dublin.
Samuel Whitbread	United Kingdom	The brig was driven ashore at Burntisland, Fife. She was on a voyage from Charlestown, Cornwall to Hartlepool, County Durham. She was refloated on 18 February and taken in to Burntisland in a leaky condition.
Susannah and Elizabeth	United Kingdom	The flat sank in Abergele Bay. Her crew were rescued.

== 16 February ==
List of shipwrecks: 16 February 1853
Ship	State	Description
Blossom	United Kingdom	The ship ran aground at King's Lynn, Norfolk. She was on a voyage from Seaham, County Durham to King's Lynn. She was refloated.
Boerhave	Netherlands	The ship was wrecked on "Chelluba Island", Burma. Her crew were rescued.
Economy	United Kingdom	The sloop sprang a leak off Cromer, Norfolk. Her crew were rescued by the schooner Richards (United Kingdom). Economy was on a voyage from Goole, Yorkshire to London. She was subsequently discovered derelict in the North Sea 2 nautical miles (3.7 km) north east of Happisburgh, Norfolk.
Gleam	United Kingdom	The ship was damaged by fire at Dartmouth, Devon.
Independence	United States	The steamship, under Captain Sampson, struck a rock at the southernmost point of the Island of Margarita, off the coast of Lower California, while en route San Juan del Sud, Nicaragua to San Francisco, California. Although she backed off the rock she was making too much water so was deliberately beached in a small cove, grounding just outside the breakers. The rising water level caused a fire and the vessel burned to the water line. Of the 418 crew and passengers on board, 129 died and 289 were rescued from the Island a few days later after attracting the attention of the whaling ships Omega, Meteor, James Maury and the barque Clement (all United States). Captain Sampson had meanwhile rowed North in an open boat to find rescue and after 30 hours rowing reached the schooner A. Emory (United States), though this arrived shortly after the rescue by the whalers.
Malpas	United Kingdom	The sloop was in collision with the schooner Ono (United Kingdom) and foundered 6 nautical miles (11 km) off Trevose Head, Cornwall with the loss of a crew member. She was on a voyage from Rouen, Seine-Inférieure to Swansea, Glamorgan.
Mary	United Kingdom	The brig was driven ashore at White Head, Maine, United States. She was on a voyage from Boston, Massachusetts, United States to Saint John, New Brunswick, British North America. She was later refloated and put in to Rockland, Maine, where she was condemned.
Mary	United Kingdom	The ship was driven ashore and wrecked in Mossel Bay with the loss of a crew member.
Secret	United Kingdom	The ship was driven ashore at Koepang, Netherlands East Indies. Her crew were rescued.
Simeon	United Kingdom	The flat ran aground and sank at Liverpool, Lancashire. She was refloated the next day.

== 17 February ==
List of shipwrecks: 1853
Ship	State	Description
Agnes	United Kingdom	The ship was driven ashore at Grimsby, Lincolnshire. She was on a voyage from London to Hartlepool, County Durham. She had broken in two by 25 February.
Amelia	Portugal	The brigantine was driven ashore and wrecked on Faial Island, Azores.
Edinburgh Castle	United Kingdom	The schooner ran aground at Sunderland, County Durham. She was on a voyage from Aberdeen to Sunderland. She was refloated and taken in to Sunderland in a leaky condition.
Eglantine	France	The schooner was destroyed by fire in the Atlantic Ocean. Her crew survived. She was on a voyage from Porto to St. Ubes, Portugal.
Ellen Gillman	United Kingdom	The ship was driven ashore and wrecked on Faial Island. She was on a voyage from Buenos Aires, Argentina to Liverpool, Lancashire. The wreck was broken up in situ.
Kingsbridge	United Kingdom	The smack was wrecked on Terceira Island, Azores. Her crew survived.
Lady Elizabeth	United Kingdom	The ship was driven ashore and wrecked on Terceira Island, Azores. Her crew were rescued.
Ludovico	Kingdom of the Two Sicilies	The ship was wrecked near Messina.
Masonic	United States	The ship ran aground on the Goodwin Sands, Kent, United Kingdom. She was on a voyage from Newcastle upon Tyne, Northumberland, United Kingdom to New York.
Merope	(United Kingdom of Great Britain and Ireland) Victoria	The ship was driven ashore and wrecked at Port Fairy. She was on a voyage from Melbourne to Adelaide, South Australia.
Rival	Portugal	The brig was driven ashore and wrecked on Terceira Island. Her crew were rescued.
Ringsbridge	United Kingdom	The ship was driven ashore and wrecked on Terceira Island. Her crew were rescued.
Salamandre	France	The ship was driven ashore and wrecked on Faial Island.
Seine	France	The schooner was driven ashore at "Superaging", Brazil and was plundered by 200 local inhabitants. She was on a voyage from Liverpool to "Paranagua", Brazil
Seraphina	United Kingdom	The ship was driven ashore and severely damaged at St. Ives.
South Esk	United States	The ship ran aground in the River Mersey.
Thetis	Portugal	The schooner was driven ashore and wrecked on Faial Island.

== 18 February ==
List of shipwrecks: 18 February 1853
Ship	State	Description
Cassandra	United Kingdom	The ship was lost off Terceira Island, Azores.
Ludovico	Trieste	The ship was driven ashore 2 nautical miles (3.7 km) north of Messina, Sicily. She was on a voyage from Trieste to Marseille, Bouches-du-Rhône, France.
Robert and Catherine	United Kingdom	The ship ran aground at Wells-next-the-Sea, Norfolk. She was on a voyage from Hartlepool, County Durham to Wells-next-the-Sea. She was refloated with assistance from the tug Economy (United Kingdom) and taken in to Wells-next-the-Sea in a leaky condition.
William and Mary	United Kingdom	The ship was abandoned in the Mediterranean Sea 30 nautical miles (56 km) east north east of Cape Bon, Beylik of Tunis. Her crew were rescued. She was on a voyage from Galaţi, Ottoman Empire to Queenstown, County Cork.

== 19 February ==
List of shipwrecks: 19 February 1853
Ship	State	Description
Antares	(United Kingdom of Great Britain and Ireland) Victoria	The ship was wrecked off Flinders Island, Van Diemen's Land with the loss of all but two of those on board. She was on a voyage from Port Phillip to Launceston, Van Diemen's Land.
Bidston	United Kingdom	The ship was abandoned in the Atlantic Ocean. Her crew were rescued by Mattoo Primeiro (Flag unknown). Bidston was on a voyage from Liverpool, Lancashire to Masulipatam, India.
Fairy	United Kingdom	The yacht was driven ashore at Corfu, United States of the Ionian Islands.
Hertelling	Netherlands	The galiot sank at Corfu. She was refloated the next day.
J. Swazey	United States	The steamship was destroyed by fire at New Orleans, Louisiana.
St, Charles	United States	The steamship was damaged by fire at New Orleans.
Wanderer	United Kingdom	The barque was driven ashore and wrecked on Vido, United States of the Ionian Islands.

== 20 February ==
List of shipwrecks: 20 February 1853
Ship	State	Description
Valiant	United Kingdom	The brig sprang a leak and was abandoned in the Atlantic Ocean. Her crew were rescued by Ellenborough (United Kingdom).

== 21 February ==
List of shipwrecks: 21 February 1853
Ship	State	Description
Arsene	France	The ship was driven ashore near Dieppe, Seine-Inférieure. She was on a voyage from Sunderland, County Durham, United Kingdom to Dieppe.
Harmony	United Kingdom	The ship was driven ashore at Bayonne, Basses-Pyrénées, France.
Jeune Anyse	France	The schooner was driven ashore and wrecked near Gravelines, Nord. Her crew were rescued. She was on a voyage from Hartlepool, County Durham to Calais. She was refloated on 26 April.
Middleton	United Kingdom	The ship foundered off Cartagena, Spain. Her crew were rescued by RMS Parana (United Kingdom).
Resolution	United Kingdom	The ship was driven ashore and wrecked at Bayonne.

== 22 February ==
List of shipwrecks: 22 February 1853
Ship	State	Description
Cybele	United Kingdom	The ship ran aground off Berbice, British Guiana. She was on a voyage from London to Berbice. She was refloated and taken in to Berbice.
Golden Light	United States	The medium clipper was struck by lightning and set afire in the Atlantic Ocean. Her crew took to five boats. Some of her crew in three boats were rescued by Shand (United Kingdom). One boat with seven crew reached Antigua. The fifth boat, with eight crew, was not heard from again. Golden Light was on a voyage from New York to San Francisco, California.
Middleton	United Kingdom	The ship sank off "Galera Zamba". Her crew survived. She was on a voyage from Liverpool, Lancashire to "Santa Martha" and Cartagena, Republic of New Granada.
Thomas and Nancy	United Kingdom	The polacca was run into by the barque Bolton (United Kingdom) and sank 5 nautical miles (9.3 km) north north east of the Eddystone Lighthouse. Her crew were rescued by Bolton. Thomas and Nancy was on a voyage from Plymouth, Devon to Newport, Monmouthshire.
Trois Soeurs	France	The ship was driven ashore at the mouth of the Palmones. She was on a voyage from Cherbourg, Manche to Marseille, Bouches-du-Rhône. She was later refloated.

== 23 February ==
List of shipwrecks: 23 February 1853
Ship	State	Description
Dame Dorothy	United Kingdom	The ship was driven ashore and wrecked near Warkworth, Northumberland. Her crew were rescued.
Glory	United Kingdom	The flat was driven ashore on the coast of Pembrokeshire. She was on a voyage from Runcorn, Cheshire to Cardiff, Glamorgan. She was subsequently taken in to Porthclais, Pembrokeshire.
Janet Johnston	United Kingdom	The sloop was wrecked off Lindisfarne, Northumberland with the loss of two of her three crew. She was on a voyage from St. Andrews, Fife to Goole, Yorkshire.
Robert	United Kingdom	The ship ran aground on the West Hoyle Bank, in Liverpool Bay. Her crew were rescued by the Rhyl Lifeboat. She was on a voyage from Dublin to Chester, Cheshire. She was refloated the next day and beached at the Point of Ayr, Cheshire.
Sir William Wallace	United Kingdom	The schooner ran aground on the Herd Sand, in the North Sea off the coast of County Durham and capsized with the loss of all hands. She was on a voyage from South Shields, County Durham to Fraserburgh, Aberdeenshire.
Walthron	United Kingdom	The schooner was driven against the quayside and sank at Grimsby, Lincolnshire. She was on a voyage from South Shields to Grimsby.

== 24 February ==
List of shipwrecks: 24 February 1853
Ship	State	Description
Aboyne	United Kingdom	The brig was driven ashore and wrecked at Tetney, Lincolnshire. She was on a voyage from King's Lynn, Norfolk to Hartlepool, County Durham. She was refloated on 29 March and towed in to Grimsby, Lincolnshire by the tug Endeavour (United Kingdom).
Candiar	United Kingdom	The schooner was driven ashore and wrecked at Ramsey, Isle of Man. She was on a voyage from Maryport, Cumberland to Belfast, County Antrim.
Dolphin	United Kingdom	The ship was driven ashore near Dieppe, Seine-Inférieure, France. Her crew were rescued.
Elizabeth	United Kingdom	The brig was driven ashore at Tetney. She was on a voyage from London to South Shields, County Durham. She was refloated on 11 March and towed in to Grimsby, Lincolnshire by the tug Endeavour (United Kingdom).
Jane and Dorothy	United Kingdom	The schooner was driven ashore and wrecked south of Warkworth, Northumberland. Her crew were rescued. She was on a voyage from Saint Andrews, Fife to Hartlepool.
Reaper	United Kingdom	The ship was driven ashore at Great Yarmouth, Norfolk. Her crew were rescued. She was on a voyage from London to Arbroath. Forfarshire.
Sarah Ann	United Kingdom	The ship ran aground at Archerstown, County Waterford. She was on a voyage from Waterford to Portsmouth, Hampshire. She was refloated and resumed her voyage.
Success	United Kingdom	The ship sank at Port Mooar, Isle of Man. Her crew were rescued.

== 25 February ==
List of shipwrecks: 25 February 1853
Ship	State	Description
Anna Rich	United States	The ship was in collision with Atlas (United Kingdom and/or Constitution (United States) and was driven ashore near Liverpool, Lancashire, United Kingdom. She was on a voyage from Liverpool to Boston, Massachusetts. Anna Rich was refloated on 8 March and beached.
Dolphin	United Kingdom	The ship was driven ashore 3 nautical miles (5.6 km) from Dieppe, Seine-Inférieure, France. She was on a voyage from Guernsey, Channel Islands to London.
Don	United Kingdom	The ship passed Cuxhaven whilst on a voyage from Hamburg to Leith, Lothian. No further trace, presumed foundered with the loss of all hands.
Gefion	Norway	The brig sprang a leak and sank off the Barbary Coast. Her crew were rescued by the brig Washburn (United Kingdom). Gefion was on a voyage from Constantinople, Ottoman Empire to Queenstown, County Cork, United Kingdom.
L'Independant	France	The ship was driven ashore at Penzance, Cornwall, United Kingdom. She was refloated and taken in to Penzance in a leaky condition.
Orono	United States	The barque was driven ashore and wrecked at Naples, Kingdom of the Two Sicilies.
Rappahannock	United States	The ship ran aground in the Mississippi River. She was on a voyage from New Orleans, Louisiana to Liverpool.
Robert Moffat	United Kingdom	The ship was driven ashore at "Porto Paglia", on the west coast of Sardinia with the loss of all but one of her crew. She was on a voyage from Newcastle upon Tyne, Northumberland to Calvi, Corsica, France.
St. Privat	France	The ship was driven ashore at Carloforte, Sardinia. Her crew were rescued.
Union	United Kingdom	The ship was lost in the Bay of Authie with the loss of all hands. She was on a voyage from South Shields, County Durham to Dieppe, Seine-Inférieure, France.

== 26 February ==
List of shipwrecks: 26 February 1853
Ship	State	Description
Amherst	United Kingdom	The brig was driven ashore at Bridlington, Yorkshire. She was on a voyage from Sunderland, County Durham to Aberdeen. She was refloated on 7 March and taken in to Bridlington.
Anna Birch	United Kingdom	The full-rigged ship was driven ashore at Dingle, Lancashire. She was on a voyage from Liverpool, Lancashire to Boston, Massachusetts, United States. She later broke in two.
Atlas	United Kingdom	The ship ran aground at Liverpool. She was on a voyage from Liverpool to New Orleans, Louisiana. She was refloated and taken in to Liverpool in a severely damaged condition.
Britannia	United Kingdom	The ship was driven ashore at Redcar, Yorkshire. Her crew were rescued. She was on a voyage from London to Hartlepool, County Durham. Britannia was refloated on 11 March and towed in to Whitby, Yorkshire.
Caliban	United Kingdom	The ship sank at Flint.
Camelia	United Kingdom	The full-rigged ship ran aground in the Rock Channel. She was refloated and taken in to Liverpool in a leaky condition.
Cassino	Netherlands	The galiot was driven ashore at Bacton, Norfolk, United Kingdom. Her crew were rescued. She was on a voyage from London to Sunderland, County Durham.
City	United Kingdom	The ship sank at Flint.
Cheshire	United States	The ship was driven ashore at Knott's Hole, Liverpool. She was on a voyage from Liverpool to Boston, Massachusetts. She was refloated and taken in to Liverpool.
Comet	United Kingdom	The schooner was driven ashore and wrecked at Crantock, Cornwall. Her crew were rescued by Dennett's rocket apparatus. She was on a voyage from Cardiff, Glamorgan to Hayle Cornwall.
Cornelia	United Kingdom	The ship ran aground in the Rock Channel. She was on a voyage from Liverpool to Boston, Massachusetts. She was refloated and put back to Liverpool.
Cumberland	United Kingdom	The ship was abandoned in the Mediterranean Sea 100 nautical miles (190 km) south west of Sardinia. Her crew were rescued by Christina (United Kingdom). Cumberland was on a voyage from Alexandria, Egypt Eyalet to Queenstown, County Cork.
Elizabeth	United Kingdom	The ship was driven ashore near Redcar. Her crew were rescued. She was on a voyage from London to Seaham, County Durham.
Ellen Glynne	United Kingdom	The sloop struck a sunken rock and was wrecked in the River Dee. Her two crew were rescued.
Frodsham	United Kingdom	The ship was run into by another vessel and sank at Morecambe, Lancashire. Her crew were rescued.
Iresus	United Kingdom	The ship was wrecked on Coquet Island, Northumberland with the loss of three of her crew.
Jane	United Kingdom	The barque ran aground and capsized in the River Mersey with the loss of eleven of the twenty people on board. She was on a voyage from Liverpool to Valparaíso, Chile.
John Ingo	United Kingdom	The ship ran aground on the Scroby Sands, Norfolk. She was refloated and taken in to Great Yarmouth, Norfolk in a leaky condition.
Kirtons	United Kingdom	The brig was in collision with another vessel and was abandoned in the North Sea off Cromer, Norfolk. Her crew were rescued by the brig Arab (United Kingdom). Kirtons was driven ashore at Winterton-on-Sea, Norfolk on 28 February in a derelict condition. She was refloated on 7 March and taken in to Great Yarmouth.
May Queen	United Kingdom	The ship was wrecked on the Herd Sand, in the North Sea off the coast of County Durham. Her crew were rescued by the South Shields Lifeboat. She was on a voyage from Bo'ness, Lothian to South Shields. May Queen was refloated on 7 March.
Nisus	United Kingdom	The schooner was driven ashore and wrecked at North Sunderland, County Durham with the loss of all three of her crew.
Prince Leopold	United Kingdom	The ship was wrecked at the mouth of the Somme with the loss of all hands. She was on a voyage from Newcastle upon Tyne, Northumberland to Abbeville, Somme.
Prompt	United Kingdom	The ship was wrecked on the coast of County Durham. Her crew were rescued by the South Shields Lifeboat. She was on a voyage from Kincardine to the River Tyne. She was refloated on 7 March.
Richardson	United Kingdom	The brig was driven ashore on the Duddon Sands, Cumberland. She was on a voyage from Whitehaven, Cumberland to London. She was repaired in situ and refloated on 23 April and taken in tow for Whitehaven but sprang a leak and sank on that date.
Rosetta	United States	The ship was driven ashore at Knott's Hole. She was on a voyage from Liverpool to Boston. She had been refloated by 28 February and taken in to Liverpool.
Seaforth	United Kingdom	The steamship was destroyed by fire off Quilon, India. She was on a voyage from Cochin, India to Adelaide, South Australia.
Vigo	United Kingdom	The schooner was driven ashore and wrecked on Walney Island, Lancashire with the loss of all four of her crew.
White	United Kingdom	The ship was driven ashore and damaged at Flint.

== 27 February ==
List of shipwrecks: 27 February 1853
Ship	State	Description
Abbotsford	United Kingdom	The ship ran aground on the Platters. She was on a voyage from London to Whitby, Yorkshire. She was refloated and taken in to Harwich, Essex.
Amy	United Kingdom	The ship ran aground at Maranhão, Brazil. She was on a voyage from Maranhão to Liverpool, Lancashire. She was refloated and taken in to Maranhão for repairs.
Catharina	Kingdom of Hanover	The koff was driven ashore and wrecked on Rottumeroog, Groningen, Netherlands. Her crew were rescued. She was on a voyage from Hull, Yorkshire to Leer.
City of Glasgow	United Kingdom	The steamship was driven ashore near Rock Ferry, Cheshire. She was on a voyage from Philadelphia, Pennsylvania, United States to Liverpool. City of Glasgow was refloated and taken in to Liverpool in a leaky condition.
Eliza	United Kingdom	The ship was driven ashore and severely damaged by fire near Le Touquet, Pas-de-Calais, France. She was on a voyage from the River Tyne to "Italy".
Irene	United Kingdom	The barque capsized in the River Medway with the loss of eleven of the twenty people on board. Survivors were rescued by the paddle tug Powerful (United Kingdom). Irene was on a voyage from Liverpool to Valparaíso, Chile. She was righted on 27 March.
John	United Kingdom	The flat was in collision with the paddle steamer Prince of Wales (United Kingdom) at Liverpool with the loss of one of the four people on board. She was on a voyage from Prestatyn, Denbighshire to Liverpool. John was taken in to Liverpool in a severely damaged condition.
John Fox	United Kingdom	The ship was wrecked in the Bay of Authie with the loss of all hands, eight or ten lives.
John Ingo	United Kingdom	The ship ran aground on the Scroby Sands, Norfolk. She was refloated and taken in to Great Yarmouth, Norfolk.
Linnet	United Kingdom	The ship foundered at Porthdinllaen, Caernarfonshire.
Mary Anne	United Kingdom	The ship was driven ashore at Blakeney, Norfolk. She was on a voyage from London to Sunderland. She was refloated and taken in to Cley-next-the-Sea, Norfolk.
New Gift	United Kingdom	The ship was holed by an anchor and foundered at Porthdinllaen.

== 28 February ==
List of shipwrecks: 28 February 1853
Ship	State	Description
Alderman Thompson	United Kingdom	The ship was driven ashore at Hartlepool, County Durham.
Amherst	United Kingdom	The ship was wrecked at Bridlington, Yorkshire. Her crew were rescued by the Bridlington Lifeboat. She was on a voyage from Sunderland, County Durham to Aberdeen.
Apollo	Sweden	The brig was abandoned in the Mediterranean Sea. She was on a voyage from Alexandria, Egypt to an English port. She came ashore on Malta on 12 March. She was driven ashore and wrecked on the west coast of Malta on 3 March.
Comet	United Kingdom	The ship was wrecked at Padstow, Cornwall.
Forest Queen	United States	During a voyage from London, United Kingdom, to Boston, Massachusetts, with general cargo including 12 tons of silver ingots, the cargo ship — a 158-foot (48 m), three-masted full-rigged ship — was driven ashore just off Second Cliff Beach at Scituate, Massachusetts. All on board were rescued. She had become a wreck by 4 March, and broke up and sank in 20 to 30 feet (6.1 to 9.1 m) of water.
Peggy	United Kingdom	The ship was driven ashore at Connah's Quay, Flintshire.
Pink	United Kingdom	The ship was driven ashore at Connah's Quauy.
Sirius	United Kingdom	The ship was driven ashore near "Grenfield", Cheshire. Her crew were rescued.

== Unknown date ==
List of shipwrecks: Unknown date in February 1853
Ship	State	Description
Active	United Kingdom	The smack ran aground on the Halliday Flats, in the North Sea off the coast of Essex. She was refloated and taken in to Harwich, Essex in a waterlogged condition.
Amazon	United Kingdom	The ship was driven ashore. She was on a voyage from South Shields, County Durham to New York, United States. She was refloated and put in to Hull, Yorkshire, where she arrived on 28 February.
Anna Dorothea	Sweden	The ship foundered in the Atlantic Ocean before 8 February. her crew were rescued by Matanzas ( (Spain) Cuba). Anna Dorothea was on a voyage from Stockholm to Messina, Sicily.
Beranger	France	The ship was driven ashore on the coast of Uruguay. She was on a voyage from Montevideo to Falmouth, Cornwall, United Kingdom. She was refloated and put back to Montevideo, where she arrived on 26 February.
Bidston	United Kingdom	The ship was abandoned at sea. Her crew were rescued. She was on a voyage from Liverpool, Lancashire to "Callingapatam".
Brant	United Kingdom	The full-rigged ship was destroyed by fire before 10 February. She was on a voyage from Pisco to Callao, Peru.
Cadiz Packet	United Kingdom	The ship foundered in the Atlantic Ocean before 21 February. Her crew were rescued by Eliza (United Kingdom).
Connecticut	United States	The ship ran aground at Pass a Loutre, Louisiana before 4 February. She was on a voyage from New Orleans, Louisiana to Liverpool. She was refloated on 14 February.
Consbrook	United Kingdom	The ship was abandoned in the Atlantic Ocean 300 nautical miles (560 km) west of Cape Clear Island, County Cork. Her crew were rescued by Nicholas Biddle (United Kingdom. Consbrook was on a voyage from Liverpool to Savannah, Georgia, United States.
Countess of Eglintoun	United Kingdom	The ship departed from Genoa, Kingdom of Sardinia for an English port on 13 or 17 February. No further trace, presumed foundered with the loss of all hands.
Dervant	United Kingdom	The brig ran aground on the Whiting Sand, in the North Sea off the coast of Suffolk. She was refloated but was consequently beached at Orford Haven. Later refloated and taken in to Harwich, Essex.
Eglantine	France	The ship was destroyed by fire off Aveiro, Portugal before 19 February. Her crew were rescued. She was on a voyage from Porto, Portugal to Havre de Grâce, Seine-Inférieure.
Ernest	France	The ship was driven ashore near Royan, Charente-Inférieure before 22 February. Her crew were rescued.
Fanny	France	The ship was wrecked before 18 February. Her crew were rescued.
Florida	United Kingdom	The ship was wrecked in the Black Sea before 19 February. She was on a voyage from Odesa to a British port.
Forager	United Kingdom	The barque was abandoned in the Atlantic Ocean before 27 February. Two of her crew were rescued by Emerald (United Kingdom); twelve had previously been taken off by the brig Clementine (France) at 34°47′N 13°21′W.
General Guilleminot	France	The ship was abandoned at sea before 28 February. Her crew were rescued by Carl (Prussia).
Henry Pratt	United States	The ship sank at Philadelphia, Pennsylvania. She was refloated on 22 February.
John Hutchinson	United Kingdom	The ship was wrecked near Buena Ventura. She was on a voyage from Liverpool to Panama City, Republic of New Grenada.
Markland	United Kingdom	The brig was in collision with another vessel and was abandoned in the Atlantic Ocean before 20 February.
Mary Ann	United Kingdom	The ship was driven ashore at Wells-next-the-Sea, Norfolk. She was refloated on 28 February.
Masonic	United Kingdom	The ship was driven ashore. She was on a voyage from South Shields, County Durham to New York. She was refloated and taken in to Ramsgate, Kent in a leaky condition. She arrived on 4 February.
Metta Catharina	Hamburg	The ship was driven ashore at Cuxhaven. She was refloated on 24 February.
Napoleon	Spain	The brig foundered whilst on a voyage from Nassau, Bahamas to Charleston, South Carolina United States. Her crew were rescued.
Olympe	France	The ship sank at Cherbourg, Manche.
Outlaw	United Kingdom	The schooner was driven ashore at Barrington, Nova Scotia, British North America. She was on a voyage from Halifax, Nova Scotia to New York. She was refloated and put in to Boston, Massachusetts, where she arrived on 6 February.
Rambler	United Kingdom	The ship foundered in the North Sea in early February. Her crew were rescued by Charles (France).
Sally	United Kingdom	The ship was driven ashore in the Bay of Biscay. She was on a voyage from Bayonne, Basses-Pyrénées, France to an Irish port.
Sweetheart	United Kingdom	The schooner ran aground on the Dutchman's Bank, off Beaumaris, Anglesey. She was on a voyage from Liverpool to Glasgow, Renfrewshire. She had become a wreck by 5 February.
Sylph	United Kingdom	The brig was driven ashore and wrecked at Wells-next-the-Sea. She was on a voyage from London to Brancaster, Norfolk.
Thistle	United Kingdom	The ship was driven ashore and sank at Fort Augustus, Inverness-shire before 23 February.
Tola Cazine	Flag unknown	The ship was wreck at "Milk Harbour", County Sligo with the loss of two of her crew.
Vrouw Wilhelmina	Netherlands	The ship was abandoned in the Dogger Bank. Her crew were rescued. She was on a voyage from "Chushanie" to Hull, Yorkshire, United Kingdom.
Wave	United Kingdom	The ship was abandoned at sea. She was on a voyage from Falmouth, Cornwall to the Isles of Scilly.
Woodside	United States	The full-rigged ship was wrecked on the Carysfort Reef before 16 February.
