= Cape Liptrap Lighthouse =

Lighthouse in Victoria, Australia

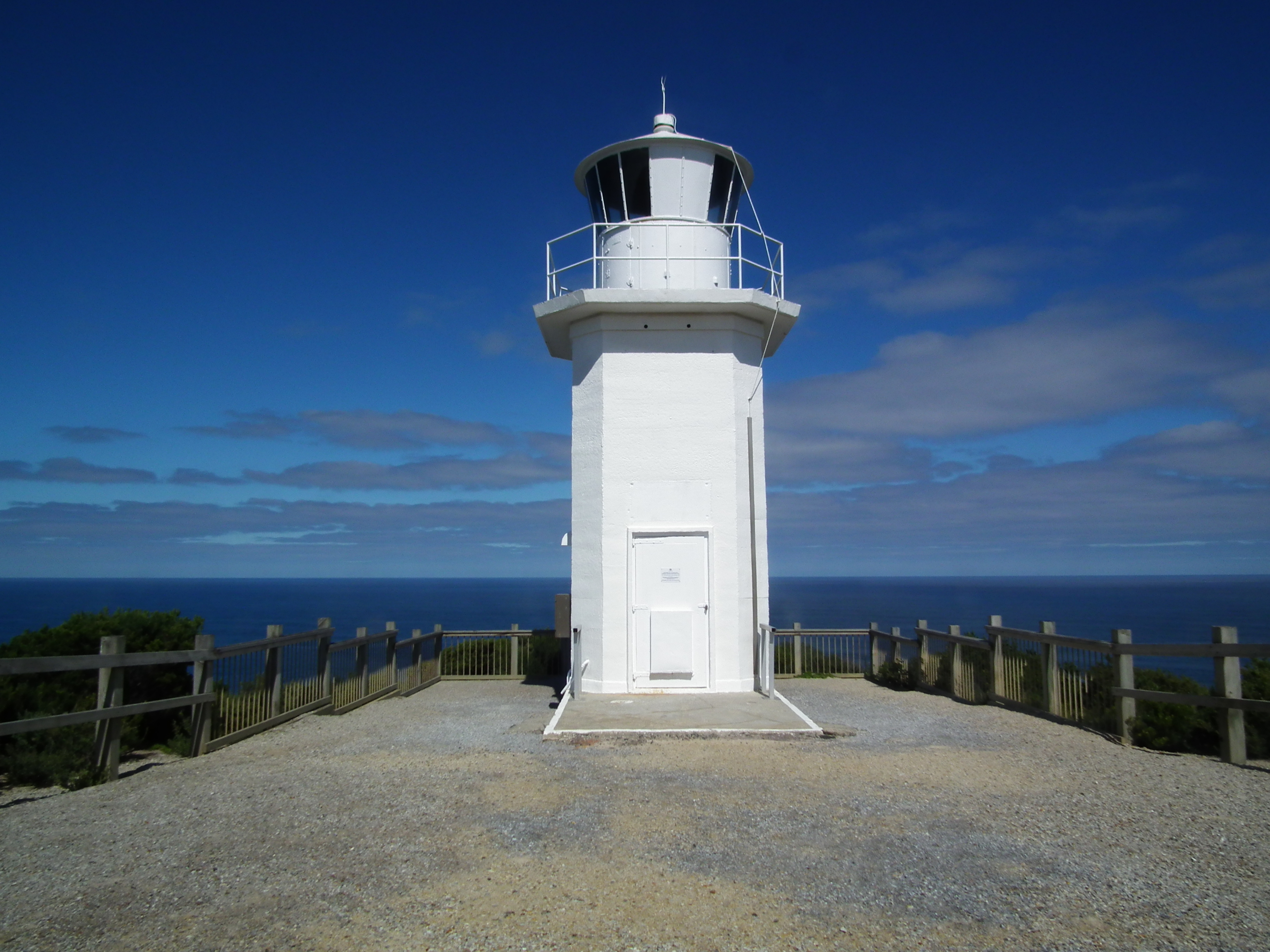
- Cape Liptrap Lighthouse
- Location: Cape Liptrap; Victoria; Australia
- Coordinates: 38°54′25.8″S 145°55′21.2″E

Tower
- Constructed: 1913 (first)
- Construction: concrete tower
- Automated: 1951
- Height: 9.75 metres (32.0 ft)
- Shape: square tower with balcony and lantern
- Markings: white tower and lantern
- Operator: Australian Maritime Safety Authority

Light
- First lit: 1951 (current)
- Focal height: 93.6 metres (307 ft)
- Intensity: 40,000 cd
- Range: 18 nautical miles (33 km; 21 mi)
- Characteristic: Fl W 12s.

Cape Liptrap Lighthouse stands upon the rocky cliff top of Cape Liptrap peninsula, on a solitary part of the South Gippsland coastline. The lighthouse warns ships of the rocks in treacherous Bass Strait.

== History ==
The first Cape Liptrap lighthouse was established in 1913. It was a 2.1 metre steel tower with an acetylene light. As a lighthouse keeper was never stationed at Cape Liptrap, it is really the first automatic Commonwealth funded light to be put into service.

The current lighthouse was built in 1951 in cast concrete and is devised in a square shape with flattened edges. The light characteristic is one flash every 12 seconds, emitted from a height of 93.6 m above sea level. The lighthouse was converted to electrical power in 1970.

== See also ==
- List of lighthouses in Australia
