= List of shipwrecks in April 1853 =

The list of shipwrecks in April 1853 includes ships sunk, foundered, wrecked, grounded, or otherwise lost during April 1853.

== 1 April ==
List of shipwrecks: April 1853
Ship	State	Description
Acor	United Kingdom	The brigantine was driven ashore and wrecked at Kilmore, County Wexford. Her crew were rescued. She was on a voyage from São Miguel Island, Azores to Liverpool, Lancashire.
Alcides	United Kingdom	The ship was driven ashore in the Humber. She was on a voyage from Hull, Yorkshire to Sunderland, County Durham. She was refloated the next day and resumed her voyage.
Ariel	United Kingdom	The ship was driven ashore and wrecked 5 nautical miles (9.3 km) east of Dunbar, Lothian with the loss of all hands. She was on a voyage from Newcastle upon Tyne, Northumberland to Port Dundas, Renfrewshire.
Celerity	United Kingdom	The ship was taken in to Dover, Kent in a derelict condition.
Duke of Sutherland	United Kingdom	The paddle steamer was wrecked at Aberdeen with the loss of sixteen lives. Five rescuers were drowned when their coble capsized. Survivors were rescued by Dennett's rocket apparatus and boats. Duke of Sutherland was on a voyage from London to Aberdeen.
Ebba	United Kingdom	The ship ran aground on the East Mouse Sand, in Liverpool Bay. She was on a voyage from Liverpool, Lancashire to Melbourne, Victoria. She was refloated and put in to the River Mersey.
Friends	United Kingdom	The ship was driven ashore and damaged in the Isles of Scilly.
Hope	United Kingdom	The sloop was run into by the schooner Jules (France) and sank in the North Sea off the coast of Yorkshire with the loss of one of her three crew. Survivors were rescued by Jules.
J. C.	United Kingdom	The ship ran aground on the Woolseners, in the English Channel off the coast of Hampshire. She was later refloated and towed in to Portsmouth, Hampshire.
Jersey	United Kingdom	The ship was driven ashore at Kingsdown, Kent. She was on a voyage from London to Berbice, British Guiana. She was refloated on 3 April and taken in to Sandwich, Kent for repairs.
Liberator	United Kingdom	The schooner was driven ashore and wrecked at Great Castle Head, Pembrokeshire with the loss of a crew member. She was on a voyage from Neath, Glamorgan to Liverpool.
Neptunus	Kingdom of Hanover	The ship ran aground on the Gunfleet Sand, in the North Sea off the coast of Essex, United Kingdom. She was on a voyage from Emden to London. She was refloated with assistance from a smack and taken in to Harwich, Essex.
Platina	United Kingdom	The sloop sank off Puffin Island, Anglesey. Her crew were rescued by a lifeboat.

== 2 April ==
List of shipwrecks: 2 April 1853
Ship	State	Description
Africa	United Kingdom	The ship was in collision with Mogador (French Navy) and sank off Sardinia. Her crew were rescued. She was on a voyage from Odesa to an English port.
Emerald	United Kingdom	The ship was driven ashore in Arklow Bay.
Garonne	United Kingdom	The brig was abandoned in the Atlantic Ocean. All on board were rescued by Standard (United Kingdom). Garonne was on a voyage from Cardiff, Glamorgan to New York, United States.
Généroux	France	The ship was driven ashore at Havre de Grâce, Seine-Inférieure. She was on a voyage from Havre de Grâce to Sunderland, County Durham, United Kingdom.
Greyhound	(United Kingdom of Great Britain and Ireland) Isle of Man	The smack was driven ashore and severely damaged at Port St. Mary. The sole crew member on board was rescued.
Industry	United Kingdom	The ship was driven ashore in Arklow Bay.
John	United Kingdom	The ship was driven ashore at Southport, Lancashire. She was on a voyage from Bangor to Birkenhead, Cheshire.
Letitia	United Kingdom	The ship was driven ashore in Arklow Bay.
Marie et Pascaline	France	The ship foundered 4 nautical miles (7.4 km) off the Tour du Four. Her crew were rescued. She was on a voyage from Bayonne, Basses-Pyrénées to Rouen, Seine-Inférieure.
Martin Luther	United Kingdom	The ship was driven ashore at Kelso Point, New South Wales. She was on a voyage from Sydney, New South Wales to Liverpool, Lancashire. She had been refloated by 9 April and resumed her voyage.
Provider	United Kingdom	The schooner was wrecked at Langness, Isle of Man with the loss of four of her five crew. She was on a voyage from Liverpool, Lancashire to Glasgow, Renfrewshire.
Success	United Kingdom	The schooner was driven ashore at Fleetwood, Lancashire with the loss of a crew member. She was on a voyage from Fowey, Cornwall to Runcorn, Cheshire.
William and Henry	United Kingdom	The schooner was driven ashore and severely damaged in Derbyhaven Bay, Isle of Man with the loss of a crew member. She was on a voyage from Preston, Lancashire to Ardrossan, Ayrshire. William and Henry was refloated on 9 April and sailed for Preston.

== 3 April ==
List of shipwrecks: 3 April 1853
Ship	State	Description
Duchess of Kent, or Duchess of Sutherland	United Kingdom	The ship ran aground on Scroby Sands, Norfolk. She was refloated and taken in to Great Yarmouth, Norfolk in a leaky condition.
Duke of Wellington	United Kingdom	The barque was wrecked at Cape Liptrap, Victoria. Her passengers were rescued.
Liberator	United Kingdom	The ship was driven ashore and wrecked at Milford Haven, Pembrokeshire with the loss of one life.
Osprey	United Kingdom	The ship was in collision with Ann and Mary (United Kingdom) and sank off Anglesey with the loss of three of her crew.
Osprey	(United Kingdom of Great Britain and Ireland) Isle of Man	The smack was beached at Maryport, Cumberland. She broke up on 6 April.
Richardson	United Kingdom	The ship was driven ashore in the Duddon Estuary. She was on a voyage from Whitehaven, Cumberland to Liverpool, Lancashire. She was refloated on 23 April and taken in tow for Whitehaven, but consequently foundered with the loss of twelve of the eighteen people on board.
Trio	United Kingdom	The ship ran aground and was severely damaged at King's Lynn, Norfolk.

== 4 April ==
List of shipwrecks: 4 April 1853
Ship	State	Description
John Kerr	United Kingdom	The ship was abandoned in the Atlantic Ocean. All on board were rescued. She was on a voyage from Glasgow, Renfrewshire to New York, United States.
Lady Newborough	United Kingdom	The ship was driven ashore at Porthdinllaen, Caernarfonshire. Her crew were rescued.
Seaflower	United Kingdom	The ship was abandoned in the Atlantic Ocean. Her crew were rescued. She was on a voyage from Cardiff, Glamorgan to New York, United States.
Storm Queen	United Kingdom	The brig was wrecked at Sulina, Ottoman Empire.

== 5 April ==
List of shipwrecks: 5 April 1853
Ship	State	Description
Marthas Vineyard	United States	The ship ran aground in New York Bay. She was on a voyage from New York to Liverpool, Lancashire, United Kingdom. She was refloated in June and towed in to New York.

== 6 April ==
List of shipwrecks: 6 April 1853
Ship	State	Description
Groningen	Netherlands	The galiot was wrecked in Saint Ouens Bay, Jersey, Channel Islands with the loss of eight of her nine crew. She was on a voyage from "Micari", Dutch Guiana to Rotterdam, South Holland.
Harmonie	Sweden	The ship ran aground off "Kaudestereden". Her crew were rescued. She was on a voyage from Hartlepool, County Durham, United Kingdom to Malmö.
Hercules	United Kingdom	The barque was abandoned in the Atlantic Ocean (35°00′N 72°30′W). Her crew were rescued by the barque Montauk (United States). Hercules was on a voyage from Fleetwood, Lancashire to Charleston, South Carolina, United States.
Huskisson	United Kingdom	The barque was driven ashore and wrecked in Carmarthen Bay. Her crew were rescued. She was on a voyage from Liverpool, Lancashire to Africa or vice versa.
Isabella	United Kingdom	The sloop was driven ashore near Berck, Pas-de-Calais, France. All on board were rescued. She was on a voyage from Portland, Dorset to Lowestoft, Suffolk.
Junior	United Kingdom	The ship was driven ashore near Étaples, Pas-de-Calais, France. Her crew survived. She was on a voyage from Callao, Peru to Aberdeen. She was refloated on 22 May and taken in to Boulogne, Pas-de-Calais.
Navarino	(United Kingdom of Great Britain and Ireland) Guernsey	The schooner ran ashore and was wrecked at Rocken End, Isle of Wight. Her crew were rescued by the Coast Guard using Dennett's rocket apparaus. She was on a voyage from Guernsey to London. She was refloated on 24 May and towed in to Cowes, Isle of Wight.
Trois Susannes	France	The coaster was wrecked on a reef west of Roguin Castle, Guernsey with the loss of three of her six crew. She was subsequently towed in to "Rocquaine", Guernsey.
Welcome	United Kingdom	The schooner was driven ashore 3 nautical miles (5.6 km) south of St. Bees Head, Cumberland.

== 7 April ==
List of shipwrecks: 7 April 1853
Ship	State	Description
Anton	Kingdom of Hanover	The ship ran aground off Alt Skagen, Denmark and was wrecked. Her crew were rescued. She was on a voyage from Liverpool, Lancashire, United Kingdom to Libava, Courland Governorate.
HMS Basilisk	Royal Navy	The paddle sloop ran aground off Southsea, Hampshire. She was refloated and taken in to Portsmouth.
Isabella	United Kingdom	The ship was driven ashore near Étaples, Pas-de-Calais, France. Her crew were rescued. She was on a voyage from Portland, Dorset to Lowestoft, Suffolk.
John Shelly	United Kingdom	The schooner was driven against the quayside and damaged at Runcorn, Cheshire. She was on a voyage from Poole, Dorset to Runcorn.
Mermaid	United Kingdom	The sloop was wrecked at Macduff, Aberdeenshire. Her crew were rescued. She was on a voyage from Portsoy, Aberdeenshire to Inverness.
Mocha	France	The full-rigged ship was destroyed by fire between Saint Croix Island and Bird Island, off the coast of the Cape Colony. Her sixteen crew survived.
Prince Albert	United Kingdom	The ship ran aground in the Hooghly River. She was on a voyage from Sydney, New South Wales to Calcutta, India.
William	United Kingdom	The ship ran aground off "Kjersgaard", Denmark. Her crew were rescued. She was on a voyage from Grangemouth, Stirlingshire to Stettin.
William	United Kingdom	The ship ran aground off "Gronhoi", Denmark. Her crew were rescued. She was on a voyage from Portmadoc, Caernarfonshire to Copenhagen, Denmark.

== 8 April ==
List of shipwrecks: 8 April 1853
Ship	State	Description
Neptuno	Spain	The brigantine was in collision with the barque John Sugars (United Kingdom) and sank in the Thames Estuary off Southend-on-Sea, Essex, United Kingdom. Her crew were rescued by John Sugars. Neptuno was on a voyage from London, United Kingdom to Bilbao.

== 9 April ==
List of shipwrecks: 9 April 1853
Ship	State	Description
Alciope	United Kingdom	The ship was struck by lightning and destroyed by fire in the Indian Ocean. Her crew were rescued. She was on a voyage from calcutta, India to Liverpool, Lancashire.
Moka	France	The ship caught fire off Cape Padrone, Cape Colony. She was abandoned the next day. She was on a voyage from Akyab, Burma to Havre de Grâce, Seine-Inférieure.
Willy	United Kingdom	The flat struck a sunken rock and sank in the Irish Sea off the coast of Lancashire. Her crew were rescued. She was on a voyage from Barrow-in-Furness, Lancashire to Saltney, Cheshire.

== 10 April ==
List of shipwrecks: 10 April 1853
Ship	State	Description
Albatross	United States	The steamship was wrecked. All on board were rescued. She was on a voyage from Key West, Florida to Veracruz, Mexico.
Bee	United Kingdom	The schooner struck a sunken object and was run ashore at Fleetwood, Lancashire. Her crew were rescued. She was on a voyage from Barrow-in-Furness, Lancashire to Saltney, Cheshire.
Dido	United Kingdom	The ship was wrecked at "Moullie Point", Cape Colony. She was on a voyage from the Swan River Colony to London.
Haiti	United States	The brig was wrecked on a coral reef off the Caicos Islands. All on board were rescued the next day by small boats. She was on a voyage from New York to Port-au-Prince, Haiti.
Virginia	United Kingdom	The ship was in collision with a barque and was beached at Rye, Sussex. She was on a voyage from London to Naples, Kingdom of the Two Sicilies. She was refloated the next day and taken in to Rye.

== 11 April ==
List of shipwrecks: 11 April 1853
Ship	State	Description
Argonaut	United Kingdom	The ship ran aground on Saltholm, Denmark. She was on a voyage from Newcastle upon Tyne, Northumberland to Swinemünde, Prussia. She was refloated and resumed her voyage.
Charlotte	Prussia	The barque was driven ashore near Helsingør, Denmark. She was on a voyage from Memel to London, United Kingdom. She was refloated the next day and resumed her voyage.
Emilie	Danzig	The ship wasdriven ashore near Helsingør. She was on a voyage from Hartlepool, County Durham to Danzig. She was refloated.
Jenny Lind	United States	The steamboat suffered a boiler explosion whilst on a voyage from Alviso, California to San Francisco, California, killing at least 31 people.
Thomas	Danzig	The schooner was driven ashore near Helsingør. She was on a voyage from Danzig to Goole, Yorkshire, United Kingdom. She was refloated the next day and put in to Helsingør.
William Shepherd	United Kingdom	The brig was driven ashore by ice and wrecked on Saltholm. She was on a voyage from Newcastle upon Tyne, Northumberland to Danzig. She was refloated on 18 April and towed in to Helsingør for repairs.

== 12 April ==
List of shipwrecks: 12 April 1853
Ship	State	Description
Barbara	United Kingdom	The schooner was driven ashore at Boulmer, Northumberland. She was refloated and taken in to Warkworth, Northumberland.
Charles Edward	(United Kingdom of Great Britain and Ireland) Van Diemen's Land	The whaler ran aground at "Papita". She was refloated and taken into port in a sinking condition.
Good Luck	(United Kingdom of Great Britain and Ireland) Jersey	The ship was wrecked on the Fakeer Rocks, off the coast of Burma. Her crew were rescued. She was on a voyage from Rio de Janeiro, Brazil to Akyab, Burma.

== 13 April ==
List of shipwrecks: 13 April 1853
Ship	State	Description
Ann and Eliza	United Kingdom	The ship ran aground at Pettycur, Fife. She was on a voyage from Newcastle upon Tyne, Northumberland to Pettycur.
Ann Mills	United Kingdom	The ship was driven ashore at Lowestoft, Suffolk. She was refloated and taken in to Lowestoft.
Clorinde, and Jeune Felix	France	The lugger Clorinde was in collision with Jeune Felix (France and sank in the Atlantic Ocean off Audierne, Finistère. Her crew were rescued by Jeune Felix, which was consequently beached at Paimbœuf, Loire-Inférieure.
Isabella	United Kingdom	The ship was driven ashore on Sandhamn Sweden. She was on a voyage from London to Memel, Prussia. She was refloated on 16 April and resumed her voyage.

== 14 April ==
List of shipwrecks: 14 April 1853
Ship	State	Description
Elizabeth	United Kingdom	The ship was driven ashore at Ballyferris Point, County Down. She was on a voyage from Glasgow, Renfrewshire to Melbourne, Victoria. She was refloated and towed in to Belfast, County Antrim.
Flora	Prussia	The ship ran aground near Memel. She was on a voyage from Torrevieja, Spain to Memel. She was refloated and taken in to Memel, where she arrived the next day.
Placid	United Kingdom	The brig was driven ashore 7 nautical miles (13 km) south of Cape Spartel, Morocco and was abandoned. She was on a voyage from Sunderland, County Durham to Gibraltar HMS Antelope (Royal Navy) was sent to her assistance but she was found to be a total wreck.
Weaver	United Kingdom	The schooner was driven ashore at Ballyferris Point. She was on a voyage from Ayr to Dublin. She was refloated and resumed her voyage.
William Shepherd	United Kingdom	The ship was driven ashore and damaged on Saltholm, Denmark. She was refloated on 18 April and towed in to Helsingør, Denmark for repairs.

== 15 April ==
List of shipwrecks: 15 April 1853
Ship	State	Description
Cathcart	United Kingdom	The ship ran aground on the Pluckington Bank, in Liverpool Bay. She was on a voyage from Liverpool, Lancashire to Coquimbo, Chile. She was refloated and put back to Liverpool.
Chesapeake	United States	The ship was in collision with the barque Templar (United Kingdom) in the Atlantic Ocean of Pernambuco, Brazil. She was on a voyage from Rio de Janeiro, Brazil to New Orleans, Louisiana. She put in to Bahia, Brazil, where she was condemned.
Duilius	(United Kingdom of Great Britain and Ireland) New South Wales	The barque was wrecked in a hurricane in Guichen Bay. Her crew survived.

== 16 April ==
List of shipwrecks: 16 April 1853
Ship	State	Description
Winchester	United Kingdom	The full-rigged ship was destroyed by fire at Port Phillip, Victoria.
Elizabeth	United Kingdom	The ship was driven ashore south of Donaghadee, County Donegal. She was on a voyage from Glasgow, Renfrewshire to Melbourne, Victoria.
Friends	United Kingdom	The ship was driven ashore in the Isles of Scilly. She was on a voyage from Newport, Monmouthshire to Southampton, Hampshire.
Helen	United Kingdom	The ship ran aground on the Outcarr Rock, off the coast of Northumberland. Her crew were rescued.
Nimrod	United Kingdom	The steamship sprang a leak and was beached at Crosby, Lancashire. She was on a voyage from Cork to Liverpool, Lancashire. She was refloated and taken in to Liverpool for repairs.
Robert	United Kingdom	The schooner was run down and sunk in the Victoria Channel by Trafalgar (United Kingdom). Her crew were rescued. Robert was on a voyage from Par, Cornwall to Liverpool.

== 17 April ==
List of shipwrecks: 17 April 1853
Ship	State	Description
Eothen	United Kingdom	The ship departed from Hong Kong for Valparaíso, Chile. No further trace, presumed foundered with the loss of all hands.
Jersey Tar	(United Kingdom of Great Britain and Ireland) Jersey	The ship was severely damaged by fire at Port Talbot, Glamorgan.
Nimrod	United Kingdom	The steamship sprang a leak and was beached at Crosby Point, Lancashire. She was on a voyage from Cork to Liverpool, Lancashire.

== 18 April ==
List of shipwrecks: 18 April 1853
Ship	State	Description
Camerton	United Kingdom	The steamship ran ashore at Skitter Point, Yorkshire. She was on a voyage from Hull, Yorkshire to Rotterdam, South Holland, Netherlands.

== 19 April ==
List of shipwrecks: 19 April 1853
Ship	State	Description
Bertha	Stralsund	The ship was driven ashore at Stralsund. She was on a voyage from Newcastle upon Tyne, Northumberland, United Kingdom to Stralsund. She was refloated on 23 April.<rev name=MP250453/>
George and Mary	United Kingdom	The ship was driven ashore in the Elbe. She was on a voyage from Newcastle upon Tyne to Hamburg. She was refloated the next day.
Mahomed Shah	United Kingdom	The ship was destroyed by fire in the Pacific Ocean. All 48 people on board were rescued by the brig Ellen (United Kingdom). Mahomed Shah was on a voyage from London to New Zealand.
Mary A. Taylor	United States	The fishing schooner was lost in the harbor at Chatham, Massachusetts.

== 20 April ==
List of shipwrecks: 20 April 1853
Ship	State	Description
Defiance	United Kingdom	The schooner was destroyed by fire at Harbour Island, United States with the loss of her captain.
Fairy	Bremen	The lugger was driven ashore at Sand Hale, Lincolnshire, United Kingdom. She was on a voyage from Bremen to Hull, East Riding of Yorkshire, United Kingdom. She was refloated.

== 21 April ==
List of shipwrecks: 21 April 1853
Ship	State	Description
Active	Norway	The ship ran aground on the Foreness Rock, Margate, Kent, United Kingdom and was wrecked. She was on a voyage from Egersud to Cowes, Isle of Wight, United Kingdom.
Britannia	United Kingdom	The ship foundered in the English Channel. Her crew were rescued by Circonstance (France). Britannia was on a voyage from Caen, Calvados, France to London.
David and John	United Kingdom	The flat was in collision with Boscius (United Kingdom) and sank in the River Mersey. Her crew were rescued. David and John was on a voyage from Liverpool, Lancashire to Runcorn, Cheshire.
Esther and Sophia	Hamburg	The ship ran aground on the Kish Bank, in the Irish Sea and was wrecked. with the loss of her captain. Survivors were rescued by Hope (United Kingdom. She was on a voyage from Liverpool to Saint Thomas, Virgin Islands. Esther and Sophia subsequently floated off in a capsized condition.
Kossuth	United States	The ship ran aground and capsized in the River Mersey. She was on a voyage from New York to Liverpool.
Mary Anne	United Kingdom	The schooner struck a rock and sank at Ardglass, County Down. Her crew survived. She was on a voyage from Glasgow, Renfrewshire to Newry, County Antrim.
Standard	United Kingdom	The ship was abandoned in the Atlantic Ocean. Her crew were rescued by Melissa (United Kingdom). Standard was on a voyage from Sunderland, County Durham to Quebec City, Province of Canada, British North America.

== 22 April ==
List of shipwrecks: 22 April 1853
Ship	State	Description
Garronne	United Kingdom	The brig was abandoned in the Atlantic Ocean. All on board were rescued by Standard (United Kingdom). Garronne was on a voyage from Cardiff, Glamorgan to New York, United States.
Stag	United Kingdom	The ship was driven ashore at Mardyck, Nord, France. She was refloated on 8 May and taken in to Dunkirk, Nord.

== 23 April ==
List of shipwrecks: 23 April 1853
Ship	State	Description
Britannia	United Kingdom	The ship sank off the Heve, in the English Channel. Her crew were rescued. She was on a voyage from Caen, Calvados to an English port.
Richardson	United Kingdom	The brig foundered in the Irish Sea off Black Combe, Cumberland with the loss of twelve of the eighteen people on board. She was being towed from the Duddon Sands to Whitehaven, Cumberland.
Speculation	United Kingdom	The flat was wrecked on the Burbo Bank, in Liverpool Bay with the loss of one of her three crew. Survivors were rescued by the tug Athens (United Kingdom).
Stag	United Kingdom	The ship was driven ashore at Dunkirk, Nord, France. She was refloated on 10 May and taken in to Dunkirk.

== 24 April ==
List of shipwrecks: 24 April 1853
Ship	State	Description
Agnes	United Kingdom	The ship ran aground on the Sloop Shoal, off the coast of Jamaica. She was on a voyage from Saint Thomas, Virgin Islands to British Honduras.
Hope	United Kingdom	The ship was driven ashore and severely damaged at Dumfries.
James and Emma	United Kingdom	The ship ran aground on the Kentish Knock and sank. Her crew were rescued. She was on a voyage from Antwerp, Belgium to London.
Providence	United Kingdom	The ship ran aground at Burnham Overy Staithe, Norfolk. She was on a voyage from Wisbech, Cambridgeshire to Rochester, Kent. She had been refloated by 10 May.
Seaflower	(United Kingdom of Great Britain and Ireland) Jersey	The brig was wrecked on the Goodwin Sands, Kent. Her crew were rescued.
Whitby	United Kingdom	The barque was wrecked on the Tory Shoal, off Kaipara Harbour, New Zealand. Her crew survived.

== 25 April ==
List of shipwrecks: 25 April 1853
Ship	State	Description
Carl Johans	Sweden	The barque ran aground and was wrecked on the Longsand, in the North Sea off the coast of Essex, United Kingdom with the loss of four of her crew. Survivors were rescued by the full-rigged ship City of Carlisle (United Kingdom). Carl Johans was on a voyage from Danzig to London, United Kingdom.
Ceres	United Kingdom	The ship was driven ashore at Cleethorpes, Lincolnshire. She was refloated and taken in to Grimsby, Lincolnshire.
Commodore	(United Kingdom of Great Britain and Ireland) Jersey	The ship ran aground on the Goodwin Sands, Kent. She was refloated with the assistance of a lugger and taken in to The Downs.
Eliza	United Kingdom	The brig was wrecked on the Newcombe Sand, in the North Sea off the coast of Suffolk. Her ten crew survived. She was on a voyage from South Shields, County Durham to London.
Eliza, and Lily	United Kingdom	The brig Eliza was in collision with Lily and sank off Pakefield, Suffolk. Lily was damaged and put in to Lowestoft, Suffolk.
James and Emma	United Kingdom	The ship ran aground on the Kentish Knock. She was refloated but consequently sank. Her crew were rescued. She was on a voyage from London to Antwerp, Belgium.
Maria	Kingdom of Hanover	The galiot ran aground on the Corton Sand, in the North Sea off the coast of Suffolk, United Kingdom. She was on a voyage from Norden to London. She was refloated but was consequently beached at Corton, Suffolk. Her crew were rescued.
Mitten Hill	United Kingdom	The sloop was driven ashore on the Terrington Marshes, Norfolk.
Olive Branch	United Kingdom	The brig was wrecked on the Haisborough Sands, in the North Sea off the coast of Norfolk with the loss of all hands.
Republican	United Kingdom	The ship was driven ashore 6 nautical miles (11 km) east of Dunkirk, Nord, France. She was on a voyage from South Shields, County Durham to Great Yarmouth, Norfolk. She was refloated on 27 May and taken in to Dunkirk.
Ripley	United Kingdom	The brig ran aground on the Orr Sand, in the North Sea. She was on a voyage from Middlesbrough, Yorkshire to Caldera, Chile. She was refloated on 27 April and taken in to Lowestoft, Suffolk.
St. André	France	The ship was driven ashore and wrecked at Kingsdown, Kent. Her crew were rescued.
Telemacho	United Kingdom	The ship was driven ashore in the Black Sea at "Carabournou", Ottoman Empire. She was on a voyage from Brăila, Ottoman Empire to an English port.

== 26 April ==
List of shipwrecks: 26 April 1853
Ship	State	Description
Agnes	United Kingdom	The ship ran aground on the Sicop Shoal.
Cesera	Kingdom of the Two Sicilies	The ship was driven ashore at Whitstable, Kent, United Kingdom. She had been refloated by 29 April and take in to Whitstable in a severely leaky condition.
Erneming	Belgium	The ship was wrecked at Ostend, West Flanders with the loss of two of her crew.
Juno	Sweden	The ship struck a sunken rock and was damaged. She was on a voyage from Newcastle upon Tyne, Northumberland, United Kingdom to Gothenburg. She put in to Egvaag, Norway in a leaky condition.
Letitia	France	brig was wrecked in the Bay of Authie with the loss of seven of her eight crew.
Mary Young	United Kingdom	The ship ran aground on the Newcombe Sand, in the North Sea off the coast of Suffolk. Her crew were rescued.
Mattos II	Portugal	The ship was driven ashore at Egremont, Lancashire, United Kingdom. She was on a voyage from Liverpool, Lancashire to Porto. She was refloated the next day and taken in to Birkenhead, Cheshire, where she capsized.
Sacramento	United States	The ship was wrecked at Port Phillip Heads, Victoria. All on board, 220 passengers and her crew, were rescued. She was on a voyage from London to Port Phillip, Victoria.
Three Friends	United Kingdom	The ship was wrecked on the Gunfleet Sand, in the North Sea off the coast of Essex. All on board were rescued. She was on a voyage from Southwold, Suffolk to London.
Tonton Pierre	France	The ship was driven ashore at Bideford, Devon, United Kingdom. Her crew were rescued. She was on a voyage from Nantes, Loire-Inférieure to Cardiff, Glamorgan, United Kingdom.
William	United Kingdom	The brig was driven ashore at Dunkirk. She was on a voyage from South Shields, County Durham to Portsmouth, Hampshire. She was refloated on 22 May.

== 27 April ==
List of shipwrecks: 27 April 1853
Ship	State	Description
Adolphe et Marie	France	The ship was in collision with Aldebaran (United Kingdom) and sank with the loss of three of her seven crew. She was on a voyage from Marseille, Bouches-du-Rhône to Dieppe, Seine-Inférieure and/or Saint-Valery-sur-Somme, Somme.
Canton	France	The ship was driven ashore at Bideford, Devon, United Kingdom. She was on a voyage from Nantes, Loire-Inférieure to Bristol, Gloucestershire, United Kingdom.
Cesira	United Kingdom	The ship was driven ashore at Whitstable, Kent.{
Harriet	United Kingdom	The brig was wrecked on the Goodwin Sands, Kent with the loss of all hands.
Lina	Kingdom of Hanover	The ship sank off the Sunk Lightship ( Trinity House). Her crew were rescued. She was on a voyage from Rustringersiel to London, United Kingdom.
Republican	(United Kingdom of Great Britain and Ireland) British North America	The ship was driven ashore at Dunkirk, Nord, France. Her crew were rescued.

== 28 April ==
List of shipwrecks: 28 April 1853
Ship	State	Description
John and Mary	United Kingdom	The ship was in collision with Ardwell (United Kingdom) and foundered in the North Sea off Flamborough Head, Yorkshire. Her crew were rescued.
Maryflower	(United Kingdom of Great Britain and Ireland) Guernsey	The ship was wrecked on the Goodwin Sands, Kent.
Susan	United States	The ship was stove by ice while attempting to enter the Sea of Okhotsk via Bussol Strait. The cargo of 350 barrels of sperm oil and 50 barrels of whale oil were lost as well as two men. The surviving crew spent over a week on nearby Urup before being rescued by the barque Black Warrior (United States).

== 29 April ==
List of shipwrecks: 29 April 1853
Ship	State	Description
Madras	India	The steamship struck a rock at Point de Galle, Ceylon and was damaged. She was on a voyage from Calcutta to Suez, Egypt. She was taken in to Bombay for repairs.
Pelham	United Kingdom	The tug struck a buoy and sank in the Zebra Channel. Her crew were rescued.
Rebecca	United Kingdom	The ship was wrecked on the west coast of Van Diemen's Land with the loss of twenty of the 31 people on board. She was on a voyage from London to Sydney, New South Wales.
Sea Nymph	United Kingdom	The ship was damaged by fire at Liverpool, Lancashire.
Vivandiere	United Kingdom	The ship was driven ashore at Rye, Sussex. She was refloated.

== 30 April ==
List of shipwrecks: 30 April 1853
Ship	State	Description
Ariel	Kingdom of Hanover	The ship exploded in the Bristol Channel with the loss of a crew member. She was on a voyage from Cardiff, Glamorgan, United Kingdom to Eslfleth.
Helen and George	United Kingdom	The schooner was driven ashore at Cramond, Lothian. She was on a voyage from Morrison's Haven, Lothian to Charleston, South Carolina, United States.
Rob the Ranter	United Kingdom	The schooner ran aground on Mutton Island, County Galway and was damaged. She was on a voyage from Bayonne, Basses-Pyrénées to Galway. She was refloated with assistance from HMS Advice (Royal Navy).

== Unknown date ==
List of shipwrecks: Unknown date in April 1853
Ship	State	Description
Acheen	United Kingdom	The ship was driven ashore and damaged on the coast of Yorkshire before 26 April.
Aurora	United Kingdom	The brig was driven ashore at Soldier's Point, County Louth before 19 April.
Barbara	United Kingdom	The ship was driven ashore on or after 15 April. She was on a voyage from Greenock, Renfrewshire to Demerara, British Guiana. She was refloated and put back to Greenock, where she arrived on 19 April.
Boadicea	United Kingdom	The schooner was abandoned in the Atlantic Ocean before 19 April. Her crew were rescued by Thames (United Kingdom). Boadicea was on a voyage from Cardiff, Glamorgan to Nantes, Loire-Inférieure, France.
Carl Otto	Flag unknown	The ship sank in the Atlantic Ocean before 20 April. Her crew were rescued by Artemisia (Flag unknown). Carl Otto was on a voyage from Newcastle upon Tyne, Northumberland, United Kingdom to Constantinople, Ottoman Empire.
Carolina	Kingdom of Sardinia	The brig was lost 23 leagues (69 nautical miles (128 km)) south of Pernambuco, Brazil. She was on a voyage from Rio de Janeiro to Pernambuco.
Emma Tully	United Kingdom	The ship struck the Passage Rock and was beached on the coast of Burma. She was on a voyage from Akyab, Burma to Ceylon.
Glory	Prussia	The ship ran aground on the Falsterbo Reef, in the Baltic Sea before 11 April.
Launceston	United Kingdom	The ship ran aground on the Long Nose, off the coast of Kent before 26 April. She was refloated.
Mattos	Portugal	The ship was driven ashore at Egremont, Lancashire, United Kingdom. She subsequently floated off and capsized off Birkenhead, Cheshire.
Mobile	United Kingdom	The ship was lost in the Black Sea before 25 April with some loss of life. She was on a voyage from Odesa to a British port.
Neptune	United Kingdom	The ship was in collision with another vessel and sank off Southend, Essex. She was on a voyage from London to Bilbao, Spain. She was refloated on 26 April.
New Minerva	United Kingdom	The brig was driven ashore at Soldier's Point before 19 April.
Susan	United Kingdom	The ship was wrecked in an icefield off Company's Island.
