= Foster, Victoria =

Foster
- Town

- Coordinates: 38°39′S 146°12′E
- Country: Australia
- State: Victoria
- LGA: South Gippsland Shire
- Location: 174 km (108 mi) SE of Melbourne; 39 km (24 mi) SE of Leongatha; 13 km (8.1 mi) W of Toora

Government
  - State electorate: Gippsland South
  - Federal division: Monash
- Elevation: 47 m (154 ft)

Population
  - Total: 1,164 (2016 census)
- Postcode: 3960

Foster is a dairying and grazing town 174 kilometres (108 mi) south-east of Melbourne on the South Gippsland Highway in Victoria, Australia. At the 2016 census Foster had a population of 1,164. It is about 20 kilometres (12 mi) north of the Gippsland coastline which includes Shallow Inlet, Corner Inlet, Waratah Bay, Yanakie and Wilsons Promontory.

== History ==
Originally called Stockyard Creek, after the stream which still flows through the centre of the town, Foster was initially just a resting place for drovers travelling from Port Albert to Western Port. This changed with the discovery of gold in the 1880s, leading to a (modest) gold rush. The post office opened on 20 February 1871 as Stockyard Creek and was renamed Foster in 1879 when the township was established. In 1870 a gold rush along Stockyard Creek resulted in the township of that name and in late 1884 following comments by the Police Magistrate from Sale (Mr William H Foster) that he couldn't hold court in a creek the town suddenly became 'Foster'. Previously a stockyard for drovers had been established along the creek but several miles from the ultimate township. The story of Foster is in a publication available at the Foster & District Historical Society Inc. The railway was extended to Foster in 1892. When the gold ran out, Foster became a service centre of the burgeoning South Gippsland dairy industry. Today it is a rural town that links Wilsons Promontory with the rest of Victoria.

== Amenities ==
Foster has one hotel and several dining options. Because of the scenery of surrounding area and its proximity to Wilsons Promontory and mountain areas inland, Foster is a destination for international visitors as well as Melbourne residents. In summer, the town's temporary population can increase by as much as two and a half fold due to tourism.

Foster has markets from November to April. The markets do not run from May through to October, during the Victorian winter.

The discovery of gold is commemorated by a bronze statue of a gold panner by artist, Kim Devenish.

== Sport and recreation ==
The football club is the Foster Tigers which is part of the Alberton Football League. Foster won the 1914 South Gippsland Shire Football Association premiership.

Foster Golf Club course is on Reserve Road.

The Great Southern Rail Trail links Foster to Leongatha in the west and Yarram in the east. The trail is used by horseriders, cyclists, runners and walkers.

== See also ==
- Foster railway station, Victoria
