= Sandy Point, Victoria =

Sandy Point
- Town
- Coordinates: 38°49′S 146°06′E
- Country: Australia
- State: Victoria
- LGA: South Gippsland Shire
- Location: 187 km (116 mi) SE of Melbourne; 52 km (32 mi) S of Leongatha; 25 km (16 mi) S of Foster

Government
  - State electorate: Gippsland South
  - Federal division: Monash

Population
  - Total: 270 (2016 census)
- Postcode: 3959

Sandy Point is a township in south Gippsland, Victoria near Wilsons Promontory, as well as the southernmost town in mainland Australia. At the 2016 census, Sandy Point had a population of 270, growing to several thousand during the holiday period. It is surrounded by areas of significant natural heritage.

Sandy Point is one of the few coastal towns in the region to remain relatively unaffected by the housing boom along the coast. This is partly due to its distance from Melbourne (around 2 hours), and the fact that a lack of town sewerage has meant a ban on further sub-division.

== History ==
The Bratowooloong people of the Gunai nation lived in the area before European settlement. The first Europeans to visit the area were three shipwrecked sailors in 1797. Irish convicts escaped south from Sydney and landed on Seal Island where several men were stranded and found by George Bass who put them ashore near Shallow Inlet to walk back to Sydney. No more was ever heard of them.

Sealers and whalers visited the area in the first half of the nineteenth century. However, it wasn't until the 1860s that the area was settled by cattle farmers. The arrival of the Gippsland railway line improved the viability of local farms and made dairy farming in the area. The Post Office opened on 2 September 1926, and was closed in 1994.

The development of the town as a tourist location started in earnest in the 1960s, but has been restricted by its natural heritage values.

== Surrounding areas ==
The Sandy Point area has a large spit system, and its shoreline, on Waratah Bay, is considered of high heritage value. Sandy Point's surf beach is patrolled during the summer months and is considered good for surfing. The beach on Waratah Bay is 18 kilometres (11 mi) long, running between Walkerville at its north-western end and Wilsons Promontory at its south-eastern end.

Three kilometres east of Sandy Point lies a river inlet known as Shallow Inlet. This sandy, tidal inlet is a popular fishing spot and a good area for windsurfing and kitesurfing. Speed sailing records have been set there on several occasions, and in 2009, the yacht "Macquarie Innovation" broke the 50-knot (93 km/h) speed barrier there.

The site is being prepared as the landfall for the 750 MW Marinus Link subsea power cable to Tasmania.

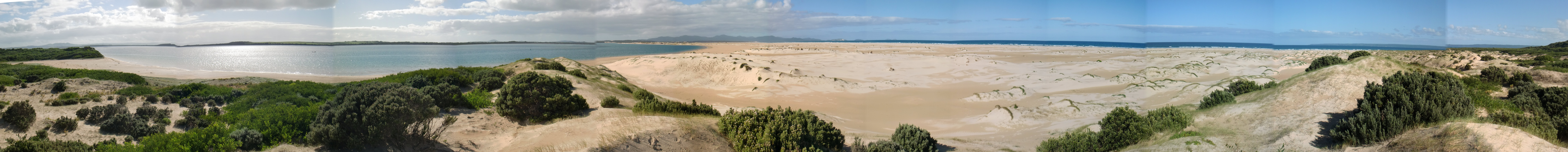
Sandy Point and Shallow Inlet Panorama, April 2011

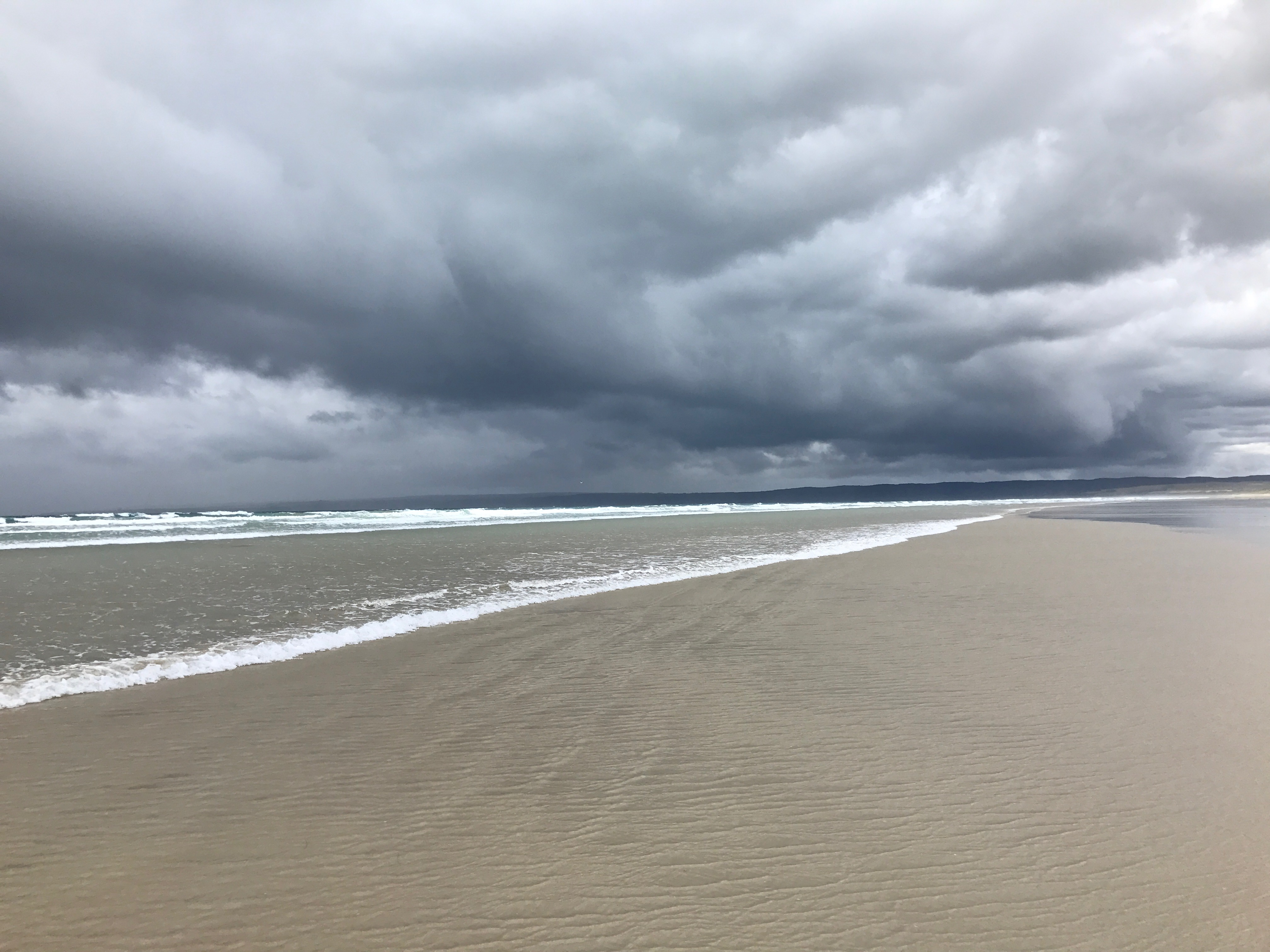
A summer storm rolls in over Waratah Bay, Sandy Point

== Natural habitats ==
The area near Sandy Point contains a diverse range of habitats including mangroves, extensive stands of coastal heathland, as well as remnant coastal grassy forest. It features a wide range of invertebrate species. There are large populations of white-footed dunnarts and koalas living in the region. It is also a significant location for the threatened eastern hooded plover.

Until 10,000 years ago, Sandy Point was on a slope leading to plains now lying underneath Bass Strait.
