= Waratah Bay, Victoria =

Waratah Bay
- Town
- Waratah Bay town centre

- Coordinates: 38°48′40″S 146°02′19″E
- Country: Australia
- State: Victoria
- LGA: South Gippsland Shire
- Location: 180 km (110 mi) SE of Melbourne; 45 km (28 mi) S of Leongatha; 25 km (16 mi) SW of Foster

Government
  - State electorate: Gippsland South
  - Federal division: Monash

Population
  - Total: 56 (2016 census)
- Postcode: 3959

Waratah Bay is a town in the South Gippsland region of Victoria, Australia, on the shore of Waratah Bay. It is home to around 300 people, of whom 56 are permanent residents. 2016 Census

The town is named after the bay which was named after a ship the Waratah which anchored here for repairs when damaged.

A Post Office named Waratah Bay opened on 10 August 1885, but was at nearby Walkerville and was renamed as such in 1892.
