= Shallow Inlet =

- Location in Victoria
- Location: Wilsons Promontory, South Gippsland, Victoria
- Coordinates: 38°48′28″S 146°08′56″E
- Primary outflows: Waratah Bay
- Basin countries: Australia
- Frozen: never
- Settlements: Sandy Point; Yanakie

Shallow Inlet is a marine inlet, opening onto Waratah Bay on the western side of the Yanakie Isthmus in South Gippsland, Victoria, south-eastern Australia. It lies close to the small holiday communities of Sandy Point and Yanakie, as well as to Wilsons Promontory and the Wilsons Promontory National Park.

== Description ==
The inlet is a shallow, curving, 18 km^{2} tidal embayment with a single channel to the sea. On the seaward side it is enclosed by a barrier of sandy spits, bars and mobile dunes. The extensive intertidal mudflats and areas of sand provide habitat for waders, or shorebirds. Fringing the mudflats are areas of saltmarsh.

== Birds ==
The inlet has been identified by BirdLife International as an Important Bird Area (IBA) because it supports over 1% of the world populations of double-banded plovers and red-necked stints, and has supported the critically endangered orange-bellied parrot. Other birds recorded as using the site in significant numbers include eastern curlews, Pacific golden plovers, curlew sandpipers and sanderlings.

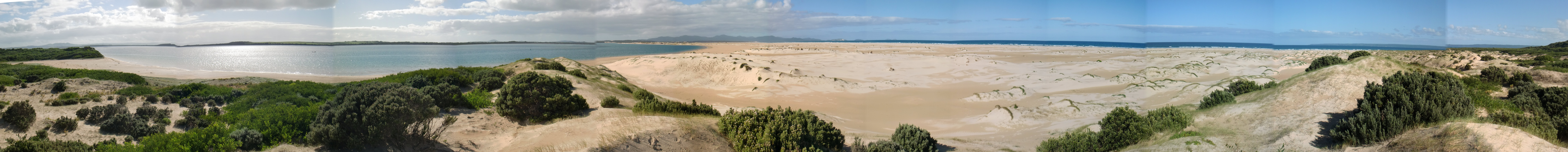
Panorama of Shallow Inlet, looking south-east with the hills of Wilsons Promontory in the distance
