= Yanakie Isthmus =

Coordinates: 38°53′S 146°14′E

Yanakie Isthmus is a sandy isthmus that connects Wilsons Promontory to mainland Victoria, south-eastern Australia. The small holiday town of Sandy Point and nearby Shallow Inlet lie on the western side of the isthmus.

Yanakie is a Koori name from the Gunai language interpreted as meaning "between waters".
