= Yanakie, Victoria =

Yanakie
- Town
- Coordinates: 38°49′47″S 146°14′17″E
- Country: Australia
- State: Victoria
- LGA: South Gippsland Shire

Government
  - State electorate: Gippsland South
  - Federal division: Monash
- Elevation: 13 m (43 ft)

Population
  - Total: 283 (SAL 2021)
- Postcode: 3960
- County: Buln Buln
- Mean max temp: 18.9 °C (66.0 °F)
- Mean min temp: 10.2 °C (50.4 °F)
- Annual rainfall: 763.9 mm (30.07 in)

Yanakie is a small, coastal township and district on the Yanakie Isthmus in South Gippsland, in the state of Victoria, south-eastern Australia. Yanakie lies between Corner Inlet on the eastern side of the isthmus and Shallow Inlet on the western side. It is on Meeniyan-Promontory Road. At the 2021 census, Yanakie had a population of 283.

Yanakie is a Koori name from the Gunai language interpreted as meaning "between waters".

== History ==
The area was one of the last to be settled in rural Victoria.

Just south of the township, one can see the Yanakie drain, which was built to drain water from a large swamp prior to settlement and runs from near the national park boundary to empty into Shallow Inlet.

The Post Office opened on 5 December 1892 and closed in 1952.

== Geography ==
=== Today ===
As the nearest town to Wilsons Promontory National Park, Yanakie has several accommodation and retail outlets. There are public toilets, a children's playground, tourist information boards, and bush and coastal walks.

Yanakie hosts regional Camp Drafts (features horse and cattle skills) at a purpose-built arena.

The main activity in the surrounding area is dairy farming, mainly because of its good and reliable rainfall. The second main occupations relate to tourism, with beef and sheep farming numbers increasing. The area also has views towards the northern end of the Promontory, and towards the Toora Hills and Toora Wind Farm across Corner Inlet.

=== Climate ===
Yanakie experiences an oceanic climate (Köppen: Cfb) with warm, drier summers and relatively mild, wetter winters. The wettest recorded day was 27 December 2023 with 61.0 mm (2.40 in) of rainfall. Extreme temperatures ranged from 43.7 °C (110.7 °F) on 25 January 2019 to −1.7 °C (28.9 °F) on 19 July 2015.

Climate data for Yanakie (38.81°S 146.19°E) (13 m (43 ft) AMSL) (2013-2025)
Month	Jan	Feb	Mar	Apr	May	Jun	Jul	Aug	Sep	Oct	Nov	Dec	Year
Record high °C (°F)	43.7 (110.7)	40.2 (104.4)	37.2 (99.0)	32.7 (90.9)	26.4 (79.5)	19.7 (67.5)	20.5 (68.9)	23.1 (73.6)	26.6 (79.9)	32.2 (90.0)	36.8 (98.2)	40.7 (105.3)	43.7 (110.7)
Mean daily maximum °C (°F)	24.0 (75.2)	23.7 (74.7)	23.0 (73.4)	19.8 (67.6)	16.9 (62.4)	14.3 (57.7)	13.8 (56.8)	14.6 (58.3)	16.4 (61.5)	18.1 (64.6)	19.8 (67.6)	22.2 (72.0)	18.9 (66.0)
Mean daily minimum °C (°F)	14.5 (58.1)	14.3 (57.7)	13.6 (56.5)	10.9 (51.6)	8.5 (47.3)	6.8 (44.2)	6.5 (43.7)	6.8 (44.2)	7.8 (46.0)	9.3 (48.7)	10.8 (51.4)	12.8 (55.0)	10.2 (50.4)
Record low °C (°F)	4.0 (39.2)	4.9 (40.8)	3.5 (38.3)	2.5 (36.5)	−0.3 (31.5)	−1.6 (29.1)	−1.7 (28.9)	−0.8 (30.6)	0.6 (33.1)	1.4 (34.5)	1.8 (35.2)	3.2 (37.8)	−1.7 (28.9)
Average precipitation mm (inches)	43.7 (1.72)	32.6 (1.28)	38.4 (1.51)	52.4 (2.06)	83.2 (3.28)	79.0 (3.11)	74.6 (2.94)	86.2 (3.39)	78.8 (3.10)	78.4 (3.09)	59.9 (2.36)	59.8 (2.35)	763.9 (30.07)
Average precipitation days (≥ 0.2 mm)	8.2	8.7	10.2	15.2	17.5	18.7	18.8	21.4	17.6	17.3	12.8	12.1	178.5
Source: Bureau of Meteorology (2013-2025)
