= Waratah Bay =

Bay in Victoria, Australia

- Location in Victoria
- Location: Gippsland, Victoria
- Coordinates: 38°50′35″S 146°01′59″E
- Primary outflows: Bass Strait
- Basin countries: Australia
- Max. depth: ~50 m (160 ft)
- Frozen: never
- Settlements: Sandy Point, Waratah Bay, Walkerville

The Waratah Bay is located in south Gippsland, Victoria. The bay is an arc of almost 20 kilometres of flat sandy beach framed by Cape Liptrap to the west and Wilsons Promontory in the east.

== History ==
Prior to the last glacial maximum, 20,000 years ago, Waratah bay and the rest of bass strait, between mainland Australia and Tasmania were exposed above sea level, and consisted of low-lying grassy fields, steppes, dunes, and tidal flats. It was along this land bridge that early humans first settled Tasmania. Sea levels rose to present levels roughly 7,000 years ago, flooding the land bridge and forming the present day bay and strait.

== Surrounding townships ==
Waratah Bay is approximately 200 kilometres (120 mi) south east of Melbourne.

The townships of Sandy Point, Waratah Bay and Walkerville are all located on the bay. Because of its proximity to Wilsons Promontory, a wide variety of sealife can be found in the rockpools along the shoreline. Some of these include sea urchins, crabs and octopuses.

== Attractions ==
There are resorts around the coast. In recent years, humpbacks, southern right whales and others are increasingly visiting the bay areas as whale numbers increase and re-colonize into their former habitat of Waratah Bay. Especially the right whales will be a big feature in winter to spring seasons as areas adjacent to Melbourne was used to be historical wintering/calving grounds. Endemic Burrunan dolphins and common dolphins that are resident in Port Phillip Bay may swim close to shores as well. The township of Walkerville, on the western side of the bay, contains historic lime kiln ruins dating back to the 19th century.
