= Walkerville, Victoria =

Walkerville
- Town
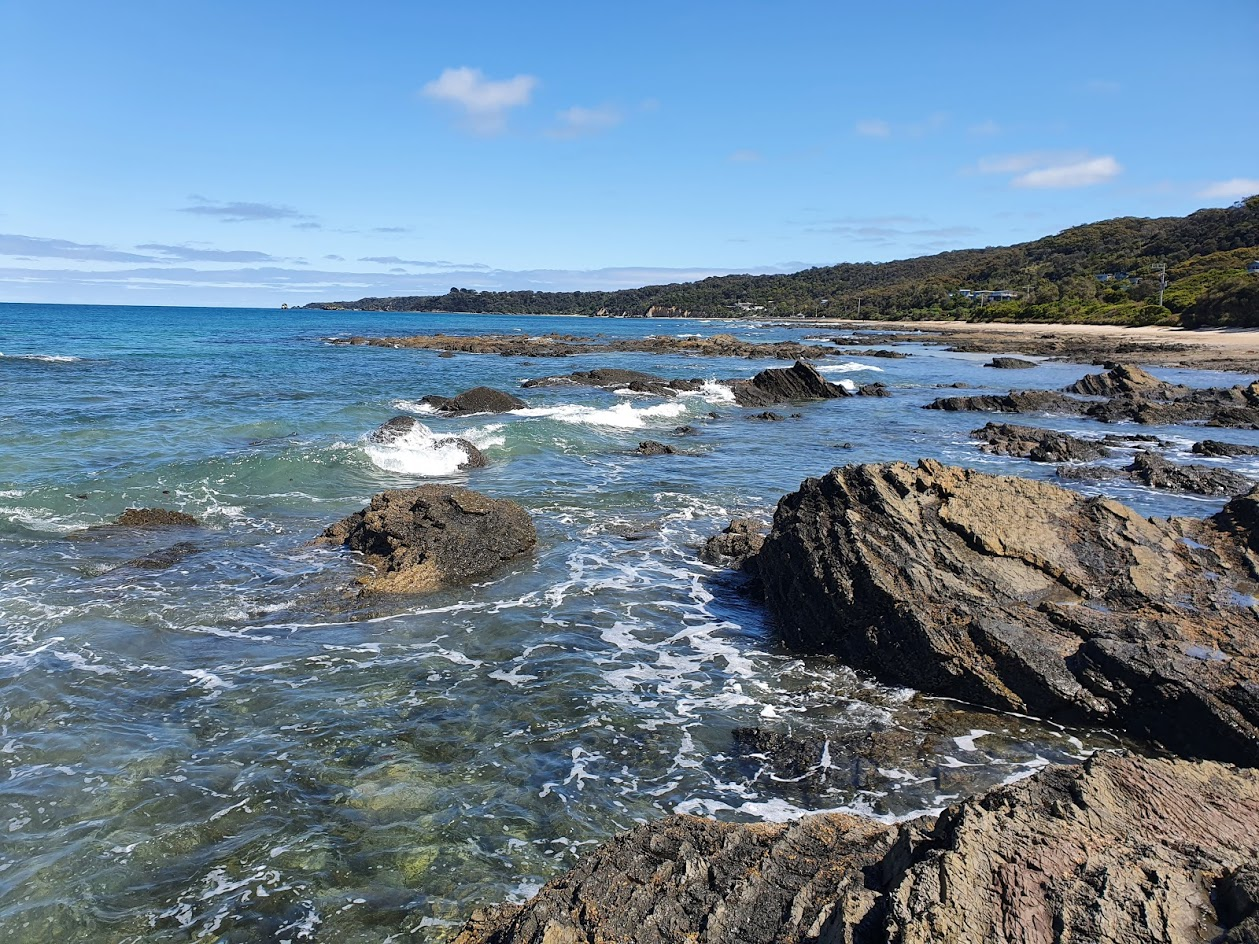
- Walkerville North coast looking towards Walkerville South

- Coordinates: 38°51′S 145°59′E
- Country: Australia
- State: Victoria
- LGA: South Gippsland Shire

Government
  - State electorate: Gippsland South
  - Federal division: Nicholls

Population
  - Total: 84 (2016 census)
- Postcode: 3956

Walkerville is a village on Waratah Bay in southwest Gippsland, Victoria, approximately 190 km southeast of Melbourne. The town comprises three sections: Walkerville North, Walkerville South, and the Walkerville Promontory View Estate. At the 2016 census, it had a population of 84, down from 262 in 2006.

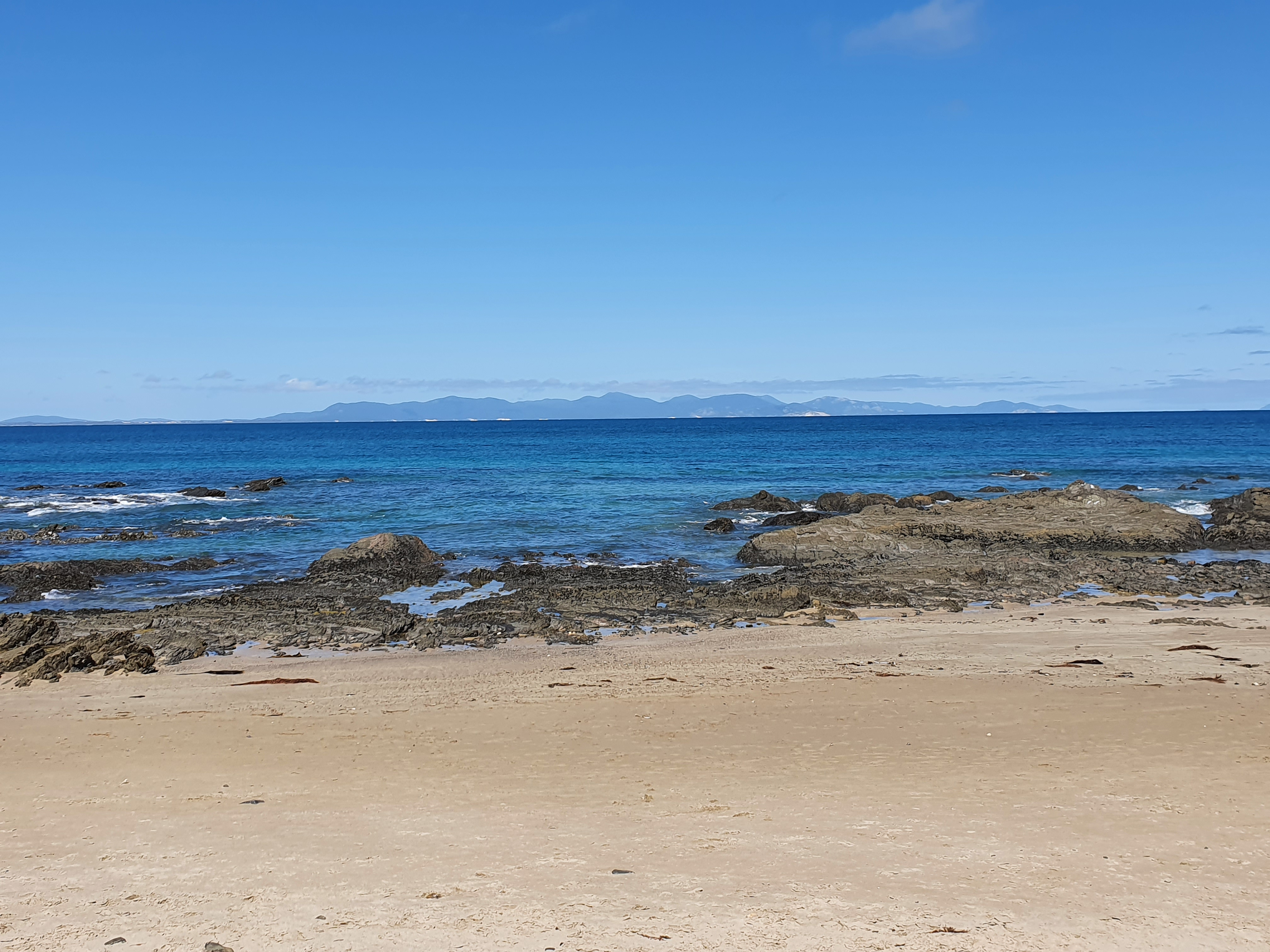
Wilsons Promontory viewed from Walkerville North beach

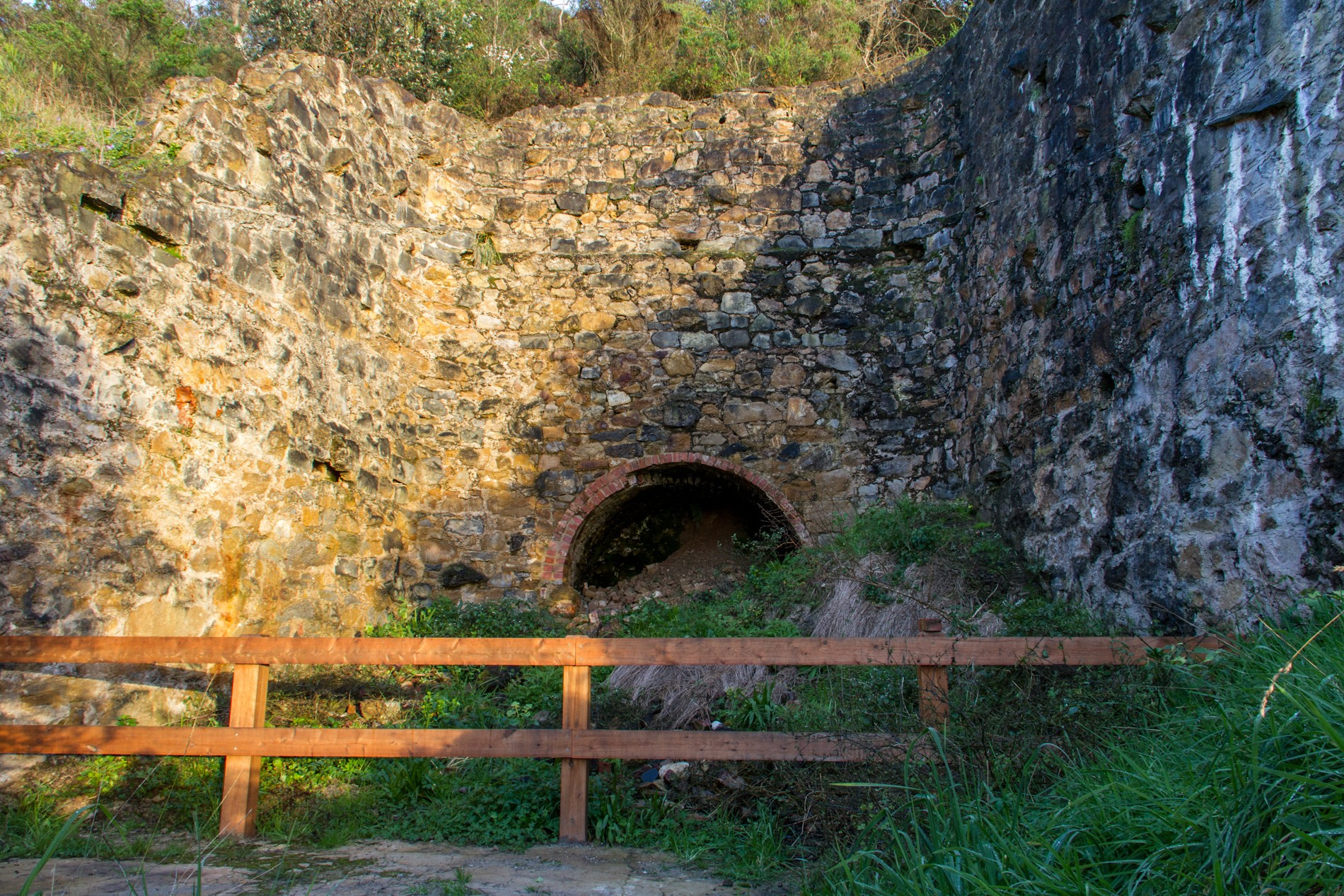
Ruins of limestone kilns at Walkerville, formerly known as Waratah

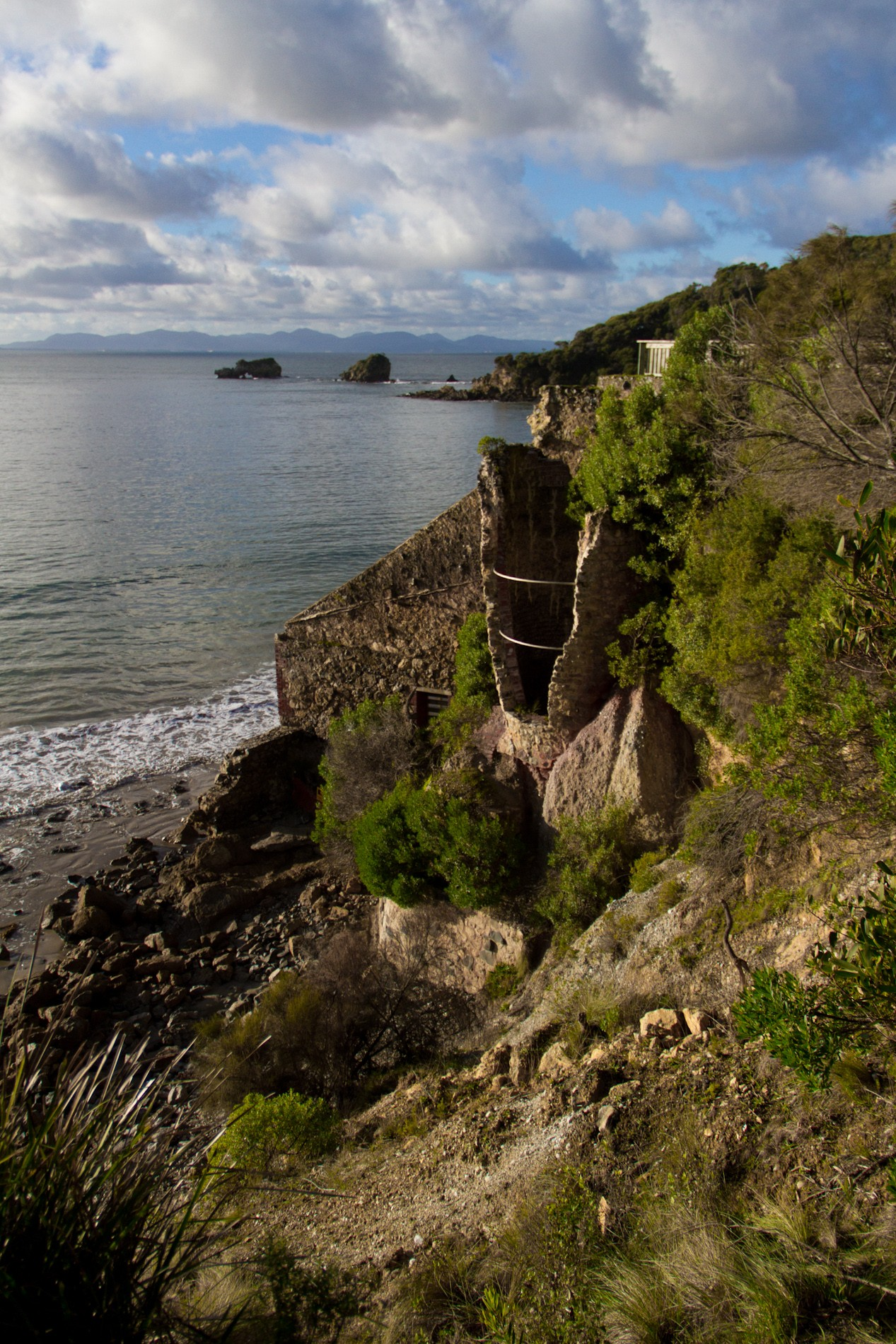
Ruins of limestone kilns viewed from the Limeburners Track

== History ==
Walkerville is situated on the traditional lands of the Brataualung people, a clan of the Gunai/Kurnai nation.

The settlement was originally named Waratah but changed to Walkerville in 1892 to avoid confusion with mail directed to Tasmania. The name honored the recently dead William Froggatt Walker, the former Victorian Customs Commissioner.

During the late 19th and early 20th centuries, Walkerville was a thriving industrial hub due to its lime production. Limestone mined from local cliffs was processed in six kilns and transported by horse-drawn trams to a 300-meter jetty for shipping. However, transportation difficulties, such as bad weather preventing ships from docking and lime spoiling in moist air, caused the industry to decline. Rising shipping costs led to the closure of operations in 1926.

A Post Office operated from 10 August 1885 until its closure in 1972.

Walkerville was a lively settlement during its peak, hosting horse races, sports, and annual balls in the old hall, which served as the center of community life. However, by 1940, Walkerville was described as a "ghost township," omitted from tourist guides and treated as if it "was not on the map" by railway and road services.

A legend associated with the town involves a ship's carpenter accused of stealing bullion in the 19th century. The gold was allegedly hidden near Walkerville, but its location was never discovered.

Today, remnants of Walkerville's history remain, including lime kiln ruins, jetty pilings, and stonework from former buildings. The old hall and other structures reflect the town's transition from an industrial hub to a tourist destination.

== Geography and Features ==
Walkerville is divided into two coastal sections and one inland section:

- Walkerville South: Features a sheltered bay with a sandy beach with access for launching boats. Access is via the Walkerville South Road.
- Walkerville North: Includes the Walkerville Foreshore Camping Reserve. There is beach access for launching boats at the end of Bayside Drive.
- Walkerville Promontory View Estate situated inland on the Walkerville Road 2.3 km north of Walkerville North. There is a CFA fire station in Panoramic Drive. The estate has no sewerage system or town water supply.

Limeburner's Walk is a track between Walkerville North and Walkerville South in Cape Liptrap Coastal Park with interpretive signage about the area's geology, mining history and a historic cemetery. The section of the walk from the cemetery to Walkerville South is currently closed due to landslips.

== Popular culture ==
Alison Lester's children's book Magic Beach, was inspired by her childhood summers in the area.

Walkerville by Weddings Parties Anything, from their 1996 album River'esque is written from the perspective of a resident of the town at the closure of limestone mining.
