= Wattle Island =

Wattle Island may refer to:

- Wattle Island (Antarctica)
- Wattle Island (Victoria)
