= Kanowna Island =

Island in Victoria, Australia

- Location within South Gippsland Shire
- Etymology: TSS Kanowna, wrecked nearby in 1929

Geography
- Location: Bass Strait
- Coordinates: 39°09′17″S 146°18′39″E

Administration
- Australia
- State: Victoria

Kanowna Island, an oceanic island, is located off the southern tip of Wilsons Promontory in Victoria, Australia. It is home to a significant breeding colonies of Australian fur seal, with an estimated 15000 seals (13.3% of the population) in 2010.

The island is within Wilsons Promontory National Park. The surrounding waters to the mean high-water mark are within Wilsons Promontory Marine National Park. It is part of the Wilsons Promontory Islands Important Bird Area, identified as such by BirdLife International because of its importance for breeding seabirds.
