= Rabbit Island =

Rabbit Island may refer to:

== Places ==
=== Australia ===
==== New South Wales ====
- Rabbit Island (New South Wales), also known as Peat Island
- Rabbit Island, Lord Howe Island group - alternate name for Blackburn Island

==== Queensland ====
- Rabbit Island (Queensland), Newry Islands National Park

==== South Australia ====
- Rabbit Island (South Australia), a small island in Louth Bay
- Rabbit Island (Jussieau Peninsula), also known as Owen Island

==== Victoria ====
- Rabbit Island, a small island in Mallacoota Inlet
- Rabbit Island, a small island in Swan Bay near Queenscliff
- Rabbit Island (Bass Strait), a small island off Wilsons Promontory
- Rabbit Rock (Bass Strait), a small island off Wilsons Promontory

==== Western Australia ====
- Rabbit Island (Western Australia), a small island near Denmark
- Rabbit Island (Albany), an historical, colloquial name for Mistaken Island

=== Canada ===
- Rabbit Island (British Columbia), in the South Thompson River, Kamloops, British Columbia
- Naniruaq formerly Rabbit Island (Qikiqtaaluk Region)

=== New Zealand ===
- Moturoa / Rabbit Island, Tasman Region, New Zealand
- Rabbit Island (Chatham Islands), New Zealand

=== Turkey ===
- Rabbit Islands (Çanakkale), a group of small islands near Tenedos (Bozcaada)
- Rabbit Island (Gümüşlük), a small island near Gümüşlük

=== United Kingdom ===
- Rabbit Island, County Fermanagh, a townland in County Fermanagh, Northern Ireland
- Rabbit Islands, Scotland

=== United States ===
- Nickname of Mānana Island in the U.S. state of Hawaii
- Rabbit Island (Michigan), in Lake Superior straight east of the Houghton/Hancock area.
- Rabbit Island (Rhode Island), in the U.S. state of Rhode Island
- Ford Island (Rabbit Island), in the U.S. state of Hawaii

=== Other places ===
- Rabbit Island, Bermuda
- Rabbit Island (Cambodia)
- Rabbit Island, Falkland Islands is located north of West Falkland in the Falkland Islands
- Rabbit Island, Lebanon
- Zayachy (Rabbit) Island, Saint Petersburg, Russia
- Ōkunoshima, Japan, often called Usagi Shima, or Rabbit Island
