= Shellback =

Shellback may refer to:

- Shellback (record producer), from Karlshamn, Sweden
- Shellback Wilderness, White Pine County, Nevada, U.S., wilderness area
- Shellback Island, Victoria, Australia
- a sailor who has participated in a line-crossing ceremony
