= Anser Island =

Island in Victoria, Australia

- Location within South Gippsland Shire
- Etymology: Anserinae, Cape Barren goose

Geography
- Location: Bass Strait
- Coordinates: 39°8′26.69″S 146°19′20.25″E
- Area: 74 ha (180 acres)
- Length: 1.8 km (1.12 mi)
- Width: 1.0 km (0.62 mi)
- Highest elevation: 152 m (499 ft)

Administration
- Australia
- State: Victoria

Anser Island lies off the southern tip of Wilsons Promontory in Victoria, Australia.

The island is within Wilsons Promontory National Park. The surrounding waters to the mean high-water mark are within Wilsons Promontory Marine National Park. It is part of the Wilsons Promontory Islands Important Bird Area, identified as such by BirdLife International because of its importance for breeding seabirds.

The island was named by Lieutenant H. J. Stanley, who surveyed the islands west and south of Wilsons Promontory in 1868, probably after the Cape Barren goose (subfamily Anserinae).
