= List of shipwrecks in September 1853 =

The list of shipwrecks in September 1853 includes ships sunk, foundered, wrecked, grounded, or otherwise lost during September 1853.

== 1 September ==
List of shipwrecks: 1 September 1853
Ship	State	Description
Express	United Kingdom	The ship ran aground on the Middle Ground Shoal, off Helsingør, Denmark. She was on a voyage from Danzig to Liverpool, Lancashire. She was refloated and resumed her voyage.
Martaban	United Kingdom	The barque ran aground on the Arklow Bank, in the Irish Sea off the coast of County Wicklow. Twenty-eight of her passengers were taken on board Crescent (United Kingdom). Martaban was on a voyage from Liverpool to Melbourne, Victoria. She was refloated and returned to Liverpool.

== 2 September ==
List of shipwrecks: 2 September 1853
Ship	State	Description
Benevolent	United Kingdom	The brig was in collision with another brig and sank in the English Channel 7 nautical miles (13 km) south east of Beachy Head, Sussex. Her six crew took to a boat; they were rescued by the lugger Hope (United Kingdom). Benevolent was on a voyage from Cardiff, Glamorgan to Hamburg.
Collins	United Kingdom	The Yorkshire Billyboy sank in the North Sea off St. Abbs Head, Berwickshire. Her crew were rescued. She was on a voyage from Grangemouth, Stirlingshire to London.
Despina	Greece	The barque was in collision with the full-rigged ship Cambridge (United Kingdom) and sank in the English Channel 6 nautical miles (11 km) south east of Dungeness, Kent, United Kingdom. Her crew were rescued by Cambridge. Despina was on a voyage from "Marianople" to Antwerp, Belgium.
Dolphin	Sweden	The brig ran aground on the Shipwash Sand, in the North Sea off the coast of Essex, United Kingdom. She was on a voyage from Hull, East Riding of Yorkshire, United Kingdom to Constantinople, Ottoman Empire.
Elizabeth	United Kingdom	The ship was wrecked in the Elbe. Her crew were rescued. She was on a voyage from Sunderland, County Durham to Hamburg.
Martaban	United Kingdom	The ship ran aground off the coast of County Dublin. Eight women were taken off by a barque. Martaban was on a voyage from Liverpool, Lancashire to Melbourne, Victoria. She subsequently became a wreck.
Nova Scotia	United Kingdom	The ship was driven ashore and wrecked on Mud Island, Province of Canada, British North America. She was on a voyage from Saint John, New Brunswick, British North America to the Clyde. She was later refloated. Nova Scotia was towed in to Saint John on 26 September by HMS Columbia (Royal Navy).
Rapid	United Kingdom	The ship was in collision with a collier brig and sank in the River Thames at Holehaven Creek. Her crew survived. She was on a voyage from Harwich, Essex to London.
Sarah Swan	United Kingdom	The barque was wrecked on Tanyong Barron Point, Borneo, Netherlands East Indies.
Tigre	United Kingdom	The ship sank in the King's Dock, Liverpool.

== 3 September ==
List of shipwrecks: 3 September 1853
Ship	State	Description
Auckland	(United Kingdom of Great Britain and Ireland) New Zealand	The cutter was wrecked on Moakan Island, off Cape Colville. Her crew were rescued.
Falcon	United Kingdom	The ship ran aground on the Burbo Bank, in Liverpool Bay. She was on a voyage from Liverpool, Lancashire to Jersey, Channel Islands. She was refloated and resumed her voyage.
Freedom	United Kingdom	The fishing smack ran aground on the Stoney Binks, in the North Sea off the mouth of the Humber with the loss of all hands. The wreck came ashore at Cleethorpes, Lincolnshire on 9 September.
Juniata	United States	The barque ran aground and sank on the Longsand, in the North Sea off the coast of Essex, United Kingdom. Her crew were rescued. She was on a voyage from South Shields, County Durham, United Kingdom to Boston, Massachusetts. Juniata was refloated and taken in to Whitstable, Kent, United Kingdom on 5 September in a derelict condition.
Susan	United Kingdom	The ship struck a sunken rock off the Blaskets, County Kerry and sank. Her crew were rescued by the schooner Eliza (United Kingdom). Susan was on a voyage from Liverpool to Galway.

== 4 September ==
List of shipwrecks: 4 September 1853
Ship	State	Description
RMS Africa	United Kingdom	The steamship ran aground at Liverpool, Lancashire. She was on a voyage from New York, United States to Liverpool. She was refloated and taken in to Liverpool.
Anenome	United Kingdom	The ship struck a sunken rock and was damaged at Porto, Portugal. She was on a voyage from Porto to London. She put back to Porto for repairs.
Betsey	United Kingdom	The schooner ran aground on the West Rocks, in the North Sea off the coast of Essex. She was on a voyage from Sunderland, County Durham to Barking, Essex. She was refloated with assistance from the smack Beaulah (United Kingdom) and resumed her voyage.
Bom Fim	Portugal	The brig ran aground at Porto. She was on a voyage from Porto to London. She was refloated and resumed her voyage.
Glendower	United Kingdom	The steamship struck the Crow Rock, off the coast of Pembrokeshire and was wrecked. She was beached at Freshwater Creek. All on board were rescued. She was on a voyage from Liverpool to Bristol, Gloucestershire. Glendower was refloated on 6 September with assistance from HMS Asp, HMS Quail and HMS Widgeon (all Royal Navy) and towed in to Milford Haven, Pembrokeshire.
Hunswick	United Kingdom	The steamship ran aground off Falkenberg, Sweden. She was on a voyage from Kronstadt, Russia to London. She was refloated and resumed her voyage.
Jeanette	United Kingdom	The ship ran aground off Margate, Kent. She was on a voyage from Arichat, Nova Scotia, British North America to London. She was refloated and taken in tow for the River Thames.
Joseph	Belgium	The abandoned ship was driven ashore and wrecked at Scarborough, Yorkshire, United Kingdom. Her crew were subsequently landed at Dover, Kent.
Marie Louise	United Kingdom	The ship was wrecked on the Nayland Rock, Kent. Her crew were rescued.
Pennie	United Kingdom	The ship was driven ashore at Little Arichat Head, Nova Scotia, British North America. She was on a voyage from Prince Edward Island, British North America to Dublin. She had been refloated by 7 September and towed in to Arichat, Nova Scotia.
Prince of Wales	United Kingdom	The ship was wrecked at Whitehead, Nova Scotia. She was on a voyage from Boston, Massachusetts to Richibucto, New Brunswick, British North America.
Sarepta	United Kingdom	The ship ran aground at Cuxhaven. She was on a voyage from Hamburg to Hartlepool, County Durham.

== 5 September ==
List of shipwrecks: 5 September 1853
Ship	State	Description
E. A. Cochrane	United States	The barque was driven ashore at Yarmouth, Isle of Wight, United Kingdom. She was on a voyage from Trinidad de Cuba, Cuba to Cowes, Isle of Wight.
Flandre	France	The ship struck a sunken rock off Algeciras, Spain and was damaged. She put in to Gibraltar. She was on a voyage from Tarragona, Spain to Sydney, New South Wales.
Jules Armand	France	The ship ran aground at the mouth of the River Thames. She was on a voyage from Blyth, Northumberland, United Kingdom to Étaples, Pas-de-Calais. She was refloated and continued her voyage but drove ashore at her destination. She was again refloated and taken in to Étaples.
Liberty	(United Kingdom of Great Britain and Ireland) Victoria	The schooner was driven ashore at Port Maquarrie. She was on a voyage from Port Maquarrie to Melbourne.
William Kerry	United Kingdom	The barque ran aground and was wrecked at Sulina, Ottoman Empire.

== 6 September ==
List of shipwrecks: 6 September 1853
Ship	State	Description
Argiro	United States	The ship was driven ashore at New York. She was on a voyage from New York to Baltimore, Maryland. She was later refloated and resumed her voyage.
Ariel	(United Kingdom of Great Britain and Ireland) New South Wales	The schooner was wrecked in Emu Bay.
Lee	United Kingdom	The ship ran aground on the Beacon Rock, off the coast of Forfarshire. She was on a voyage from Königsberg, Prussia to Dundee, Forfarshire. She was refloated and found to be leaky.
Queen	United Kingdom	The ship ran aground at Calcutta, India. She was on a voyage from Calcutta to Port Phillip, Victoria to Sydney, New South Wales. She was refloated and put back to Calcutta in a leaky condition.
Swansea Packet	United Kingdom	The ship was wrecked on a reef off Rabbit Island, Van Diemen's Land. Her crew were rescued.

== 7 September ==
List of shipwrecks: 7 September 1853
Ship	State	Description
Cairo	United Kingdom	The barque was abandoned in the Atlantic Ocean. Her crew were rescued by Waldron Holmes (United States).
Earl Stradbroke	United Kingdom	The ship was abandoned at sea. Her crew were rescued. She was on a voyage from Arkhangelsk, Russia to Dordrecht, South Holland.
Good Intent	United Kingdom	The ship was driven on to the Cock Point Rocks, near Folkestone, Kent. She was refloated the next day and taken in to Folkestone.
Jantina	Netherlands	The ship ran aground at Kronslot, Russia. She was on a voyage from Málaga, Spain to Liverpool, Lancashire, United Kingdom and Kronslot. She was refloated and put in to Saint Petersburg.

== 8 September ==
List of shipwrecks: 8 September 1853
Ship	State	Description
Haabet	Norway	The ship was abandoned at sea. She was on a voyage from New York to Hull, Yorkshire, Ireland.
Martaban	United Kingdom	The barque sank at Liverpool, Lancashire, having struck the quayside on her return, pushing the fluke of her anchor through her bow. She was refloated the next day.
William Penn	United States	The ship ran aground in the Hooghly River. She was on a voyage from Calcutta, India to Boston, Massachusetts. She was refloated and put back to Calcutta for repairs.

== 9 September ==
List of shipwrecks: 9 September 1853
Ship	State	Description
Auguste	Stralsund	The brig ran aground on the Long Sand, in the North Sea off the coast of Essex, United Kingdom. She floated off and sank. Her crew took to the boats and reached the Sunk Lightship ( Trinity House), from where they were rescued by the smack Rose in June (United Kingdom). Auguste was on a voyage from Stettin to Havre de Grâce, Seine-Inférieure, France.
Charlotte	United Kingdom	The schooner sank off Portland, Dorset. Her crew were rescued.
Frances Anne	United Kingdom	The brig ran aground on the Gunfleet Sand, in the North Sea off the coast of Essex. She was refloated and taken in to the River Thames.
Rose	United Kingdom	The brig ran aground on the Gunfleet Sand. She was refloated and taken in to the River Thames.

== 10 September ==
List of shipwrecks: 10 September 1853
Ship	State	Description
Eole	(flag) France	The ship foundered in the English Channel off Cherbourg, Manche. Her crew were rescued.
Protector	United Kingdom	The barque was destroyed by fire at Melbourne, Victoria. Her crew survived.
Southerner	United States	The ship foundered in the Atlantic Ocean. Her crew took to a boat; they were rescued on 18 September by Marshfield (United Kingdom). Southerner was on a voyage from Glasgow, Renfrewshire, United Kingdom to New York.
Vesta	United Kingdom	The ship was abandoned off the coast of Nova Scotia, British North America. She was on a voyage from Nova Scotia to Liverpool, Lancashire. She came ashore on 12 September.

== 11 September ==
List of shipwrecks: 11 September 1853
Ship	State	Description
Douglas	United Kingdom	The ship was destroyed by fire at "King's Harbour", Newfoundland, British North America. All on board were rescued. She was on a voyage from Leith, Lothian to Quebec City. Province of Canada, British North America.
Solway	United Kingdom	The ship was abandoned in the Atlantic Ocean (48°30′N 24°30′W). Her nine crew were rescued by Curlew (United Kingdom). Solway was on a voyage from Quebec City, Province of Canada to Ipswich, Suffolk.
Willia Ray	United Kingdom	The ship was abandoned in the Atlantic Ocean. Her crew were rescued by Curlew (United Kingdom).
Zaroni	(United Kingdom of Great Britain and Ireland) British North America	The ship foundered in the Atlantic Ocean. Her crew were rescued by Julius (United Kingdom). Zaroni was on a voyage from the Clyde to Boston, Massachusetts, United States.

== 12 September ==
List of shipwrecks: 12 September 1853
Ship	State	Description
Anthracite	United Kingdom	The ship ran aground near Williamstown, Victoria. She was on a voyage from Grimsby, Lincolnshire to Melbourne, Victoria.
Asa Pack	(United Kingdom of Great Britain and Ireland) New South Wales	The ship was driven ashore at Point Henry, Victoria.
Ceres	United Kingdom	The sloop was driven ashore at Trebetherick Point, Cornwall with the loss of all hands. She was on a voyage from Padstow to New Quay.
Hannah Maria	United Kingdom	The ship driven ashore 15 nautical miles (28 km) west of Cape Jaffa, South Australia. All on board were rescued. She was on a voyage from Plymouth, Devon to Adelaide, South Australia and Melbourne, Melbourne.
Hornet	United Kingdom	The ship was wrecked in the Strait of Belle Isle. She was on a voyage from Quebec City, Province of Canada, British North America to Limerick.
Royalist	United Kingdom	The brig was abandoned in the Atlantic Ocean. Her crew were rescued. She was on a voyage from Quebec City, Province of Canada, British North America to Conway, Caernarfonshire.
Victoria	United Kingdom	The ship was abandoned in the Atlantic Ocean. Her crew were rescued by Warbler (United Kingdom). Victoria was on a voyage from Quebec City to London.

== 13 September ==
List of shipwrecks: 13 September 1853
Ship	State	Description
Charles Hammerton	United Kingdom	The ship was abandoned in the Atlantic Ocean. Her crew were rescued by New Orleans (United States). Charles Hammerton was on a voyage from Saint Andrews, New Brunswick, British North America to Liverpool, Lancashire.
Familiens Haab	Norway	The barque was abandoned in the Atlantic Ocean. Her crew were rescued by Saratoga (United States). Familiens Haab was on a voyage from Quebec City, Province of Canada, British North America to London, United Kingdom.
Hendon	United Kingdom	The brig ran aground on the Haisborough Sands, in the North Sea off the coast of Norfolk. She was refloated with assistance from the yawl Dart (United Kingdom).
Henry Horbeck	United States	The barque foundered in the Atlantic Ocean. Ten survivors were rescued by the steamship Velasco (Spain). Henry Herbeck was on a voyage from New York to Cardiff, Glamorgan, United Kingdom.
Intrepide	France	The lugger was driven ashore at Staithes, Yorkshire, United Kingdom and was abandoned by her crew. She was later refloated and towed in to Whitby, Yorkshire.
Julia	(United Kingdom of Great Britain and Ireland) Victoria	The ship caught fire and was beached at Point Nepean.
Punch	United Kingdom	The brig ran aground in Holdfast Bay. She was on a voyage from Calcutta, India to Adelaide, South Australia.

== 14 September ==
List of shipwrecks: 14 September 1853
Ship	State	Description
Brenda	United Kingdom	The brig was driven ashore and wrecked at Villaricos, Spain. Her crew were rescued.
Torridge	United Kingdom	The schooner was wrecked on the North Tail, in the Bristol Channel. She was on a voyage from Appledore, Devon to Newport, Monmouthshire.

== 15 September ==
List of shipwrecks: 15 September 1853
Ship	State	Description
Cambria	United Kingdom	The ship ran aground on the Pluckington Bank, in Liverpool Bay. She was on a voyage from Saint John, New Brunswick, British North America to Liverpool, Lancashire. She was refloated and taken in to Liverpool.

== 16 September ==
List of shipwrecks: 16 September 1853
Ship	State	Description
Brown	United Kingdom	The ship was abandoned in the Atlantic Ocean with the loss of two of her crew. Survivors were rescued by Stadacona (United Kingdom). Brown was on a voyage from Quebec City, Province of Canada, British North America to Sunderland, County Durham.
Helena	(United Kingdom of Great Britain and Ireland) New South Wales	The barque was wrecked at Waitakere Bay (possibly Bethells Beach) in New Zealand during a heavy westerly gale, with the loss of seven of her eleven crew. She was en route from Melbourne, Victoria to Hokianga, New Zealand.
Undaunted	United Kingdom	The schooner was driven ashore and wrecked at Point Miscow, New York, United States. She was on a voyage from Bathurst, Gambia Colony and Protectorate to Boston, Massachusetts, United States.
Wellington	United Kingdom	The ship was wrecked in Exeter Bay, Davis Straits.

== 17 September ==
List of shipwrecks: 17 September 1853
Ship	State	Description
Primrose	United Kingdom	The ship was driven ashore on the Hendon Rocks, on the coast of County Durham. She was refloated.
Rover	United Kingdom	The fishing smack was driven ashore at Redcar, Yorkshire. She was refloated.
Sovereign	United Kingdom	The barque sank in the Atlantic Ocean off the Falkland Islands with the loss of four of her crew. Survivors were rescued by the brig Anna Cecilia (Denmark). Sovereign was on a voyage from London to San Francisco, California.

== 18 September ==
List of shipwrecks: 18 September 1853
Ship	State	Description
Aid	United Kingdom	The sloop was wrecked in the Farne Islands, Northumberland. Her crew were rescued. She was on a voyage from Newcastle upon Tyne, Northumberland to Port Dundas, Renfrewshire.
Albatross	United Kingdom	The ship was wrecked at "Houstrop". Her crew were rescued. She was on a voyage from Jersey, Channel Islands to Kronstadt, Russia.
Edward	United Kingdom	The ship was abandoned in the Atlantic Ocean. Her crew were rescued by Mortimer Livingstone (United States). Edward was on a voyage from Cardenas to the Clyde.
Jessie	United Kingdom	The ship was driven ashore on Bornholm, Denmark. She was on a voyage from London to Danzig. She was refloated on 20 September and taken in to Rønne.
Maid of Marshland	United Kingdom	The ship was sighted in the Øresund whilst on a voyage from Königsberg, Prussia to Hull, Yorkshire. No further trace, presumed foundered with the loss of all hands.

== 19 September ==
List of shipwrecks: 19 September 1853
Ship	State	Description
Numa	United Kingdom	The ship, which had sprung a leak on 8 September, was beached at Ereceira, Portugal, where she became a wreck. Her crew were rescued. She was on a voyage from Cádiz, Spain to Halifax, Nova Scotia, British North America.
Pillau	Prussia	The ship ran aground and capsized at Sunderland, County Durham, United Kingdom.

== 20 September ==
List of shipwrecks: 20 September 1853
Ship	State	Description
Ada	United Kingdom	The ship was wrecked on Scharhörn. Her crew were rescued. She was on a voyage from Newport, Monmouthshire to Harburg.
Annie	(United Kingdom of Great Britain and Ireland) Cape Colony	The ship was lost in the Torres Straits. Her crew were rescued.
Cecilia	United Kingdom	The barque foundered off "Moyapore", India. She was on a voyage from Calcutta, India to Rangoon, Burma.
Commerce	United Kingdom	The flat was driven ashore at Maryport, Cumberland. She was on a voyage from Ramsey, Isle of Man to Maryport.
Dauntless	United Kingdom	The ship ran aground on Neckman's Ground, in the Baltic Sea. She was on a voyage from Newcastle upon Tyne, Northumberland to Kronstadt, Russia.
Druid	United Kingdom	The ship was lost in the Torres Strait before 5 November. She was on a voyage from Hobart, Van Diemen's Land to Singapore, Straits Settlements.
Louise	Norway	The ship ran aground at "Gallstrom's Bruk". She was on a voyage from Sundsvall to "Gallstrom's Bruk". She was later refloated.
Una	United Kingdom	The ship was wrecked on Bornholm, Denmark. Her crew were rescued. She was on a voyage from Leith, Lothian to Riga, Russia.

== 21 September ==
List of shipwrecks: 21 September 1853
Ship	State	Description
Gladiator	United Kingdom	The brigantine was driven ashore at Point-des-Monts, Province of Canada, British North America. She was on a voyage from Hartlepool, County Durham to Montreal, Province of Canada. She was later refloated and taken in to Quebec City, Province of Canada, where she arrived on 28 September.
Posthumus	(United Kingdom of Great Britain and Ireland) Victoria	The barque was wrecked at Kaipara Harbour, New Zealand while attempting to take shelter from a heavy gale.
Priscilla	United Kingdom	The barque was driven ashore at Point-des-Monts.
Richard Cobden	United Kingdom	The ship capsized in the Albert Dock, Liverpool, Lancashire. She was righted.
Satellite	United Kingdom	The ship was driven ashore on the coast of South Australia. She was on a voyage from London to Adelaide, South Australia.
Thetis	United Kingdom	The ship ran aground on the Manicougan Shoals. She was on a voyage from Newport, Monmouthshire to Quebec City.

== 22 September ==
List of shipwrecks: 22 September 1853
Ship	State	Description
City of Rochester	United Kingdom	The ship was wrecked on Anholt, Denmark. Six crew survived, the remainder took to a boat and were listed as missing. She was on a voyage from Danzig to Rochester, Kent. City of Rochester floated off on 27 September. She drove ashore at Halmstad, Sweden the next day and was wrecked.
Dorothea	Duchy of Holstein	The ship ran aground on a reef off Skagen, Denmark. She was on a voyage from Dundee, Forfarshire, United Kingdom to Flensburg She was refloated and resumed her voyage.
Isabella	United Kingdom	The ship was in collision with the steamship Cambria (United Kingdom) and was abandoned in the Baltic Sea. She was on a voyage from Newcastle upon Tyne, Northumberland to Saint Petersburg, Russia.
Penelope	United Kingdom	The ship was sighted off Plymouth, Devon whilst on a voyage from Cardiff, Glamorgan to Bremen. Subsequently foundered with the loss of all hands. wreckage from the ship washed up at Harlingen, Friesland in October.
Prince of Wales	United Kingdom	The sloop ran aground at Lindesfarne, Northumberland. She was on a voyage from Sunderland, County Durham to Londonderry. She was refloated and taken in to Lindesfarne.
Pledge	United Kingdom	The schooner was in collision with Donan (Hamburg) and sank with the loss of five of her crew. Survivors were rescued by Donan.
Wilberforce	United Kingdom	The ship ran aground off Skagen, Denmark. Her crew were rescued. She was on a voyage from Cardiff, Glamorgan to Kronstadt, Russia. She subsequently became a wreck.

== 23 September ==
List of shipwrecks: 23 September 1853
Ship	State	Description
Bertha	Prussia	The brig was wrecked on the Goodwin Sands, Kent, United Kingdom. Her crew were rescued by a Deal lugger. She was on a voyage from Havre de Grâce, Seine-Inférieure to Königsberg.
Rapid	United Kingdom	The brig was driven ashore at Folkestone, Kent. She was refloated and taken in to Folkestone.

== 24 September ==
List of shipwrecks: 24 September 1853
Ship	State	Description
HMS Banshee	United Kingdom	The ship ran aground at Cork. She was refloated.
Eude Orodre	Norway	The ship was driven ashore and wrecked at Stavanger.
Francis	United States	The barque was destroyed by fire at Kronstadt, Russia.
Lady Mill	United Kingdom	The ship departed from The Downs for Amsterdam, North Holland, Netherlands. No further trace, presumed foundered with the loss of all hands.
Louise	Norway	The ship ran aground at Sundsvall. She was refloated.
Maria	United Kingdom	The fishing smack was driven ashore at Redcar, Yorkshire. She was on a voyage from Grimsby, Lincolnshire to Hartlepool, County Durham. She was refloated and resumed her voyage.
Sea Nymph	United Kingdom	The barque was driven ashore on the north point of Hogland, Russia. Her crew were rescued. She subsequently became a wreck.
Thomas and Mary	United Kingdom	The brig ran aground off Anholt, Denmark. She floated off but consequently capsized 20 nautical miles (37 km) north of Anholt with the loss of a crew member. She was on a voyage from Danzig to Blyth, Northumberland.
Twende Brodre	Norway	The ship was wrecked on the Tadder Reef. She was on a voyage from Bergen to Newcastle upon Tyne, Northumberland, United Kingdom.

== 25 September ==
List of shipwrecks: 25 September 1853
Ship	State	Description
Allen Brown	United Kingdom	The ship was driven ashore on Gore's Island, in Strangford Lough.
American	United Kingdom	The full-rigged ship was driven ashore near Southport, Lancashire. She was on a voyage from Liverpool, Lancashire to San Francisco, California, United States. She was refloated on 30 September and towed in to Liverpool by the tugs Express and Victoria (both United Kingdom).
Ann and Eliza	United Kingdom	The ship departed from North Berwick, Lothian for Newcastle upon Tyne, Northumberland. No further trace, presumed foundered with the loss of all three crew.
Barnard	United Kingdom	The ship was driven on to the Goodwin Sands, Kent. She was on a voyage from the Saint Lawrence River to London. She was refloated and taken in to Margate, Kent.
Chieftain	United Kingdom	The ship was driven ashore in the River Lune. Her crew were rescued. She was on a voyage from Quebec City, Province of Canada, British North America to Lancaster, Lancashire. She had been refloated by 1 October and taken in to Glasson Dock, Lancashire.
Citizen	United States	The whaler, a full-rigged ship, was wrecked in the Pacific Ocean at latitude 67° north with the loss of five of her crew.
Clyde	United Kingdom	The ship was driven ashore at the Black Cape, Newfoundland, British North America. She was on a voyage from Liverpool to Quebec City.
Daniel Weld	(United Kingdom of Great Britain and Ireland) British North America	The ship ran aground and sank at Saint John, New Brunswick. Her crew were rescued. She was on a voyage from Windsor, Nova Scotia to an American port.
Felicity	United Kingdom	The ship ran aground in the River Mersey. She was on a voyage from Jamaica to Liverpool. She was refloated.
Gazelle	United Kingdom	The sloop was driven ashore and wrecked at Padstow, Cornwall. Her crew were rescued. She was on a voyage from Portrush, County Antrim to Penzance, Cornwall.
Helen Hughes	United Kingdom	The ship capsized off Folkestone, Kent. She was on a voyage from London to Havre de Grâce, Seine-Inférieure, France. She was subsequently driven ashore at Dover.
Intrinsic	United Kingdom	The ship was driven ashore at Liverpool. She was on a voyage from Quebec City to Liverpool. She was refloated on 29 September and taken in to Liverpool.
Janets and Margarets	United Kingdom	The ship was driven ashore on the Isle of May, Fife with the loss of a crew member.
John	United Kingdom	The ship was driven ashore at Fleetwood, Lancashire. Her crew were rescued. She was on a voyage from Quebec City to Lancaster.
John Laverack	United Kingdom	The ship was wrecked on Islay, Outer Hebrides. Her crew were either lost, or rescued. She was on a voyage from Glasgow, Renfrewshire to Stettin.
Joseph Walker	United Kingdom	The full-rigged ship was driven ashore and severely damaged at Liverpool. She was on a voyage from New York, United States to Liverpool. She was refloated the next day and taken in to Liverpool.
London	United Kingdom	The schooner ran aground on the Holme Sand, in the North Sea off the coast of Suffolk. She was refloated and resumed her voyage.
Maria	United Kingdom	The brig was driven ashore at Liverpool. All on board were rescued. She floated off and ran aground on the Pluckington Bank, in Liverpool Bay. Caroline was on a voyage from Prince Edward Islands, British North America to Liverpool. She was refloated on 28 September and taken in to Liverpool.
Neva	United States	The ship was driven ashore at Liverpool with some loss of life. She was on a voyage from Liverpool to an American port. She was refloated the next day and taken in to Liverpool.
Pauline	Netherlands	The schooner was driven into Jean Bart (French Navy in The Downs and severely damaged.
Penrhyn	United Kingdom	The sloop sank in the River Mersey.
Primrose	United Kingdom	The schooner departed from London for a Baltic port. No further trace, presumed foundered with the loss of all hands.
Rhuddlan Trader	United Kingdom	The flat was driven ashore in Rhos Bay. Her crew were rescued.
Robert and Isabella	United Kingdom	The snow was driven ashore and wrecked on Stoneskar, Russia. She was on a voyage from Kronstadt, Russia to the River Tyne.
Wanderer	United Kingdom	The ship ran aground at King's Lynn, Norfolk. She was on a voyage from South Shields, County Durham to King's Lynn.
William Ward	United Kingdom	The ship was driven ashore at New Ferry, Cheshire. She was on a voyage from Richibucto, New Brunswick, British North America to Liverpool. She was refloated on 30 September and taken in to Liverpool.

== 26 September ==
List of shipwrecks: 26 September 1853
Ship	State	Description
Alexander	United Kingdom	The ship ran aground off Maryport, Cumberland. She was on a voyage from Quebec City, Province of Canada, British North America to Maryport.
Camerton	United Kingdom	The steamship foundered in the North Sea 14 nautical miles (26 km) north west by north of Goeree, Zealand, Netherlands. Fifteen people were rescued by the steamship Natal (United Kingdom). Three people were reported missing, presumed drowned. Camerton was on a voyage from Rotterdam, South Holland, Netherlands to Hull, Yorkshire.
Donnington	United Kingdom	The sloop departed from London for Dunkirk, Nord. No further trace, presumed foundered with the loss of all hands.
Ellen Hughes	United Kingdom	The ship was driven ashore at Dover, Kent. She was on a voyage from London to Havre de Grâce, Seine-Inférieure, France. She was refloated on 2 October.
Fanny Heron	(United Kingdom of Great Britain and Ireland) British North America	The ship was wrecked on a reef off Eleuthera. Her crew were rescued. She was on a voyage from Halifax, Nova Scotia to Matanzas, Cuba.
Flint Castle	United Kingdom	The ship ran aground at Waterford. She was on a voyage from Waterfor to Arklow, County Wicklow. She was refloated the next day and resumed her voyage.
Fredioch Lycka	Sweden	The ship was wrecked betweed Skagen and Frederikshavn, Denmark. She was on a voyage from Stettin to Sunderland, County Durham, United Kingdom.
Friends	United Kingdom	The brig was driven onto the Carr Bank, in the North Sea off the coast of Northumberland and sank. She was refloated on 28 November and taken in to Berwick upon Tweed, Northumberland.
Harriet and Phœbe	United Kingdom	The ship was driven ashore at Porthdinllaen, Caernarvonshire. She was on a voyage from the Bristol Channel to Holyhead, Anglesey.
Johan Emil	Rostock	The ship was wrecked on Skagen. Her crew were rescued. She was on a voyage from Hartlepool, County Durham to Stettin.
John and Hannah's Endeavour	United Kingdom	The sloop was driven ashore and wrecked at Blakeney, Norfolk with the loss of all three people on board.
Joven Nicolao	Portugal	The ship was driven ashore on Terschelling, Friesland, Netherlands with the loss of four of her crew. She was on a voyage from Newcastle upon Tyne to Lisbon.
Liberté	France	The ship was driven ashore on Terschelling. Her crew were rescued. She was on a voyage from Goole, Yorkshire, United Kingdom to Langesund, Norway.
Maria	United Kingdom	The ship was driven ashore in the River Mersey. She was on a voyage from Prince Edward Island, British North America to Liverpool, Lancashire. She was refloated the next day and taken in to Liverpool.
Mariner's Hope	United Kingdom	The ship was driven ashore at Kronstadt, Russia. She was refloated the next day.
Martha Andrea	Norway	The full-rigged ship was abandoned off Warden Point, Isle of Sheppey, Kent, United Kingdom. She was on a voyage from London, United Kingdom to Tønsberg, Duchy of Schleswig. She was taken in to Whitstable, Kent the next day by the smack Sydney (United Kingdom).
Mary Ann	United Kingdom	The schooner was driven ashore at Blakeney. Her crew were rescued. She was on a voyage from Stockton-on-Tees, County Durham to London.
Mary Ann	United Kingdom	The brig was abandoned off the Kentish Knock. Her crew were rescued by a smack. She was on a voyage from Sunderland, County Durham to Newhaven, Sussex. Mary Ann was taken in to Great Yarmouth, Norfolk in a derelict condition on 28 September.
Odin	(flag) Denmark	The steamship was driven ashore and sank at Thisted.
Peter and Anna	Flag unknown	The abandoned schooner was driven ashore near "Oxoe", Norway. She was on a voyage from London to Middlesbrough. Yorkshire, United Kingdom.
Rover	United Kingdom	The smack was driven ashore and wrecked on the coast of Norfolk with the loss of all hands.
Success	United Kingdom	The sloop was wrecked on Big Harker Rock, in the Farne Islands, Northumberland with the loss of a crew member.
Vine	United Kingdom	The sloop caught fire and foundered in the North Sea off Huntcliff Foot, Yorkshire due to her cargo of quicklime getting wet. Her crew were rescued by Ebenezer (United Kingdom). She was on a voyage from Sunderland to Arbroath, Forfarshire.
Wanskapen	Russia	The barque was driven ashore at Egmond aan Zee, North Holland, Netherlands. Her crew were rescued. She was on a voyage from St. Ubes, Portugal to a Finnish port.

== 27 September ==
List of shipwrecks: 27 September 1853
Ship	State	Description
Admiral	Russia	The schooner was driven ashore on the Kattendyk. She was on a voyage from Antwerp, Belgium to Hartlepool, County Durham, United Kingdom. She was refloated and resumed her voyage.
Augustus	Sweden	The brig was driven ashore at Hook of Holland, South Holland, Netherlands. Her crew were rescued. She was on a voyage from Karlskrona to an English port.
Blanche Margarite	France	The ship was wrecked on the Tadder Reef. She was on a voyage from Sarzeau, Morbihan to Gothenburg, Sweden.
Dart	United Kingdom	The ship was driven ashore at Wijk aan Zee, North Holland, Netherlands and was abandoned. Her crew were rescued. She may have been on a voyage from Arbroath, Forfarshire to Seaham, County Durham with a crew of four.
Haabet	Denmark	The ship was wrecked off "Harbover". Her crew were rescued. She was on a voyage from Hull, Yorkshire to Thisted.
Isaac Wright	United Kingdom	The ship was struck a sunken rock and was severely damaged 40 nautical miles (74 km) south of Cork. Ten of her 600 passengers were taken off by Oucanasta (United States). Isaac Wright was on a voyage from Liverpool, Lancashire to New York, United States.
Jane	United Kingdom	The ship was driven ashore in the Köhlbrand. She was on a voyage from Cardiff, Glamorgan to Harburg.
Janet and Margaret	United Kingdom	The ship was driven ashore on the Isle of May with the loss of a crew member.
Jeans	United Kingdom	The schooner was driven ashore 4 nautical miles (7.4 km) north of North Berwick, Lothian. Her crew were rescued. She was on a voyage from Cullen, Moray to Newcastle upon Tyne, Northumberland. She was refloated on 4 October and towed in to Leith, Lothian.
Johanna Maria	Netherlands	The ship was driven ashore and wrecked on Goeree, Zeeland. Her crew were rescued. She was on a voyage from Middlesbrough, Yorkshire, United Kingdom to Galaţi, Ottoman Empire.
Minerva	Belgium	The ship was driven ashore at Ellewoutsdijk, Zeeland. She was on a voyage from Havana, Cuba to Antwerp. She was refloated on 3 October and completed her voyage.
Regina Elizabeth	United Kingdom	The ship was driven ashore at Brielle, South Holland, Netherlands. She was on a voyage from Brielle to Port Dundas, Renfrewshire.
Sabrina	United Kingdom	The steamship ran aground in the River Lee at Blackrock Castle, Cork. She was on a voyage from Cork to Bristol, Gloucestershire.
Warrior	United Kingdom	The brig was driven ashore on Walney Island, Lancashire. She was on a voyage from Drogheda, County Louth to Barrow-in-Furness, Lancashire. She was refloated on 1 October and taken in to Barrow-in-Furness.
Wilhelmina	Sweden	The ship was wrecked on a reef off the south east point of Gotland. She was on a voyage from Soderhamn to London, United Kingdom.

== 28 September ==
List of shipwrecks: 28 September 1853
Ship	State	Description
Annabel	United Kingdom	The brig was driven into a bridge at Cocagne, New Brunswick, British North America and damaged.
Annie Jane	United Kingdom	The brig struck rocks off Vatersay, Outer Hebrides and sank with the loss of 360 of the 491 people on board. She was on her maiden voyage, from Liverpool, Lancashire to Montreal, Province of Canada, British North America.
Boindie	United Kingdom	The ship sprang a leak and was beached in Loch Ryan. She was on a voyage from Glasgow, Renfrewshire to Liverpool.
Evergreen	United Kingdom	The ship was driven ashore at Shediac, New Brunswick.
Jeune Emile	United Kingdom	The ship was wrecked on the Longsand, in the North Sea off the coast of Essex, United Kingdom. Her crew were rescued. She was on a voyage from Seaham, County Durham, United Kingdom to Fécamp, Seine-Inférieure.
Louisiana	France	The ship ran aground at the mouth of the Gambia River and was wrecked. She was on a voyage from Bathurst, Gambia Colony and Protectorate to Marseille, Bouches-du-Rhône.
Maria	United Kingdom	The ship was driven ashore on Goeree, Zeeland, Netherlands. She was on a voyage from Middlesbrough, North Riding of Yorkshire to Galaţi, Ottoman Empire.
Recovery	United Kingdom	The ship was driven ashore in the "Scodoie River", New Brunswick.

== 29 September ==
List of shipwrecks: 29 September 1853
Ship	State	Description
Adelaide	United Kingdom	The ship was driven ashore at Richibucto, New Brunswick, British North America. She had become a wreck by 4 October.
Albion	United Kingdom	The full-rigged ship was driven ashore at Richibucto. She had become a wreck by 4 October.
Cupid	United Kingdom	The ship was abandoned in the North Sea (54°42′N 3°22′E). Her crew were rescued by Royal William (United Kingdom). Cupid was on a voyage from Lowestoft, Suffolk to Seaham, County Durham.
Doctor	United Kingdom	The brig was driven ashore at Richibucto.
Elizabeth Grange	United States	The ship was driven ashore and wrecked at Richibucto, New Brunswick, British North America.
Fadrenes Minde	Norway	The ship was driven ashore at Richibucto. She had become a wreck by 4 October.
Florence	(United Kingdom of Great Britain and Ireland) British North America	The ship was driven ashore on Beard Island, in the Gut of Canso.
Fortune	United Kingdom	The ship was driven ashore at Maryport, Cumberland. She was on a voyage from Dublin to Maryport. She was refloated on 1 October and taken in to Whitehaven, Cumberland.
Hannah Maria	United Kingdom	The ship was driven ashore at Cape Jaffa, South Australia. All on board were rescued. She was on a voyage from London to Adelaide, South Australia.
Harmony	United Kingdom	The brig was driven ashore at Ryde, Isle of Wight. She was on a voyage from Southampton, Hampshire to London.
Lovewell	United Kingdom	The schooner was abandoned off the Lemon and Ower Sand, in the North Sea. Her crew were rescued by Lively (United Kingdom) before she foundered off Flamborough Head, Yorkshire.
Metoka	United Kingdom	The ship was driven ashore on Fairy Island, New Brunswick. She was refloated and resumed her voyage to Liverpool.
Mountaineer	United Kingdom	The barque was driven ashore at Richibucto. She had become a wreck by 4 October.
Ploughboy	United Kingdom	The ship was driven ashore at Richibucto.
Recovery	United Kingdom	The barque was driven ashore at Richibucto.
Rival	(United Kingdom of Great Britain and Ireland) British North America	The packet ship was driven ashore at Richibucto.
Surprise	United Kingdom	The schooner was driven ashore and wrecked at Newhaven, Sussex. She was refloated on 30 September and taken in to Newhaven.
Victory	United Kingdom	The paddle steamer ran aground on The Barrells, off the coast of County Waterford and sank with the loss of a crew member. She was on a voyage from Waterford to Liverpool, Lancashire.
Wasp	(United Kingdom of Great Britain and Ireland) British North America	The schooner was driven ashore at Richibucto.

== 30 September ==
List of shipwrecks: 30 September 1853
Ship	State	Description
Annie Marie	United Kingdom	The schooner was driven ashore on Ile Madame, Nova Scotia, British North America. She was on a voyage from Quebec City, Province of Canada, British North America to Liverpool, Lancashire.
Belgique	Belgium	The ship was wrecked on the English Bank, in the River Plate. She was on a voyage from Rio de Janeiro, Brazil to Antwerp.
Box	Prussia	The ship was wrecked at "Slette". Her crew were rescued. She was on a voyage from Swinemünde to an English port.
Guysborough Packet	United Kingdom	The ship was wrecked on Little Arichat Head, Nova Scotia, British North America.
Hebe	United Kingdom	The ship was driven ashore at Pärnu, Russia.
Matura	United Kingdom	The ship was wrecked on Neckman's Ground, in the Baltic Sea. She was on a voyage from Sunderland, County Durham to Kronstadt, Russia.
Plymouth	United States	The barque foundered in the Atlantic Ocean. Her crew were rescued. She was on a voyage from Pictou, Nova Scotia to Boston, Massachusetts.

== Unknown date ==
List of shipwrecks: Unknown date in September 1853
Ship	State	Description
Algonia	(United Kingdom of Great Britain and Ireland) British North America	The ship was dismasted and abandoned in the Atlantic Ocean. Her crew were rescued by Diligente (France). Algonia was on a voyage from Cardiff, Glamorgan, United Kingdom to City Point, Virginia, United States.
Aurora	United Kingdom	The ship ran aground in the Woosung River. She was on a voyage from Shanghai, China to Port Phillip, Victoria. She was refloated and put in to Hong Kong, where she arrived on 10 September.
Austin Pillon	United Kingdom	The ship ran aground on the Port Tobacco Shoals, off the coast of Virginia, United States. She was on a voyage from Bristol, Gloucestershire to Alexandria, Virginia.
Bengal	United Kingdom	The ship sank at Calcutta, India between 15 and 30 September. She had been refloated by 4 October.
Bess	United Kingdom	The ship ran aground at Piraeus, Greece. She was on a voyage from London to Smyrna, Ottoman Empire. She was refloated on 1 October and taken in to Piraeus.
Brunswick	United Kingdom	The ship was driven ashore and wrecked between Campduin and Egmond aan Zee, North Holland, Netherlands. Her crew were rescued. She was on a voyage from Cardiff, Glamorgan to Hamburg.
Capelan	France	The ship was driven ashore and wrecked near Conil de la Frontera, Spain between 6 and 10 September. She was on a voyage from Cádiz, Spain to Marseille, Bouches-du-Rhône.
Cecilia	United Kingdom	The ship foundered off "Mangapore" before 22 September. She was on a voyage from Rangoon Burma to Moulmein, Burma.
Clara	United States	The brig was wrecked off the coast of Sierra Leone by a tornado.
Clarence	United Kingdom	The brig was abandoned in the Atlantic Ocean before 21 September. Her crew were rescued by Westmoreland (United Kingdom). Clarence was on a voyage from Saint John, New Brunswick, British North America to Dublin.
Conqueror	(United Kingdom of Great Britain and Ireland) British North America	The brig was abandoned in the Atlantic Ocean before 17 September. Her crew were rescued by Corsair (United Kingdom). Conqueror was on a voyage from Yarmouth, Nova Scotia to Antigua.
Corea	United Kingdom	The ship was abandoned in the Atlantic Ocean before 13 September. She was on a voyage from Quebec City, Province of Canada, British North America to Gloucester.
Euphemio	Flag unknown	The schooner capsized in the Weser.
Grief	Prussia	The brig ran aground in the Vlie. She was on a voyage from London to a Baltic port.
Habbet	Norway	The ship was abandoned in the Atlantic Ocean between 8 and 17 September. Her crew were rescued by Corsair (United Kingdom). Habbet was on a voyage from New York, United States to Arendal.
Harmony	United Kingdom	The brig ran aground off Ryde, Isle of Wight. She was refloated on 30 September and resumed her voyage.
Jessie Stephen	United Kingdom	The ship was abandoned in the Atlantic Ocean before 30 September.
Julia	France	The ship was driven ashore at "Calapiombo", Sardinia before 20 September.
Justin	France	The ship was wrecked on the Noorder Haaks Bank, in the North Sea off the Dutch coast before 15 September. She was on a voyage from Havre de Grâce, Seine-Inférieure to Saint Petersburg, Russia.
J. W. Buddecke	Bremen	The ship foundered in the Atlantic Ocean. Her crew were rescued by Eliza (United Kingdom). J. W. Buddecke was on a voyage from Charleston, South Carolina, United States to Bremen.
La Perlita	United Kingdom	The paddle steamer was last sighted in the Smyth Channel, southern Chile, on 2 September 1853, on her maiden voyage from Liverpool to Buenaventura, Colombia, then disappeared. It was presumed that she had foundered with the loss of all hands.
Leonine	United States	The ship was lost.
Liverpool	United Kingdom	The barque foundered in the Atlantic Ocean with the loss of all but five of the 21 people on board. Survivors were rescued by the barque Clara Ann (United States). Liverpool was on a voyage from Liverpool, Lancashire to Jamaica.
Liverpool	Prussia	The barque was wrecked on the Koog, in the North Sea before 26 September with the loss of all but four of her crew. She was on a voyage from Alexandria, Egypt to Cowes, Isle of Wight, United Kingdom.
Louisiana	France	The ship was wrecked on the coast of the Gambia Colony and Protectorate.
Maria	United Kingdom	The ship foundered in the Pacific Ocean before 13 September whilst on a voyage from Callao, Peru to an English port. Her 36 crew were rescued by the barque Maria (Spain).
Mencius	United Kingdom	The ship ran aground in the Yangtze kiang before 14 September. She was on a voyage from Liverpool to Shanghai. She was refloated on 16 September and taken in to Shanghai.
Nesserland	(flag) Kingdom of Hanover	The ship ran aground in the Vlie. She was on a voyage from Cardiff to Leer.
Neva	Russia	The ship ran aground on the Bedgrund, off Falsterbo, Sweden before 19 September. She was refloated and towed in the Copenhagen, Denmark by the steamship Hertha (Denmark).
Palendar	United Kingdom	The ship was driven ashore on Grand Menan. She was on a voyage from Saint John's, Newfoundland to Greenock, Renfrewshire. She was refloated and towed in to Westport, Nova Scotia in a waterlogged condition.
Pumic	United Kingdom	The ship ran aground in the Yangtze kiang before 14 September. She was on a voyage from Liverpool to Shanghai. She was refloated on 21 September and resumed her voyage.
Puma	United Kingdom	The ship was driven ashore south of Woosong, China before 14 September. She was on a voyage from Liverpool to Shanghai. She was refloated on 21 September and resumed her voyage.
Solway	United Kingdom	The ship was abandoned in the Atlantic Ocean.
Swansea Packet	United Kingdom	The ship struck a reef off Rabbit Island, Victoria and foundered. Her crew were rescued.
William and M. Brown	United Kingdom	The ship was wrecked on the Albatross Rock before 16 September. She was on a voyage from Melbourne, Victoria to Singapore.
