= Skull Rock =

Skull Rock may refer to:

- A rock formation located in Joshua Tree National Park
- Skull Rock Pass in the House Range of Utah
- Cleft Island (Victoria), Australia
- A fictional place on the show The Berenstain Bears
- A fictional place in the 1953 film Peter Pan
