= Seal Rock =

Seal Rock, Seal Rocks, or Seal's Rock may refer to:

== Australia ==
- Seal Rocks, New South Wales
- Seal Rocks (Victoria)
  - Seal Rocks Sea Life Centre

== United Kingdom ==
- Seal's Rock, Lundy, Devonshire
- Seal Rock, Isles of Scilly

== United States ==
- Seal Rock, Farallon Islands, San Francisco
- Seal Rock (Laguna Beach)
- Seal Rock, Oregon
  - Seal Rock, nearby archaeological site listed on the National Register of Historic Places in Lincoln County, Oregon
  - Seal Rock State Recreation Site
- Seal Rocks (San Francisco)
- Seal Rock (San Mateo County, California)

== See also ==
- Seal Island (disambiguation)
- Seal rock, in petroleum extraction technology
