= Seal Island =

Seal Island, Seal Islands and similar may refer to:

== Places ==
=== Africa ===
- Seal Island, South Africa, known for predation by great white sharks on the Cape Fur Seal
- Seal Island, one of the Bird Islands in Algoa Bay, South Africa
- Seal Island, Namibia, in Lüderitz Bay

=== Antarctica ===
- Seal Islands (South Shetland Islands)

=== Australia ===
==== South Australia ====
- Seal Island (Encounter Bay), part of the West Island Conservation Park
- Seal Island (Investigator Strait), part of the Althorpe Islands Conservation Park

==== Tasmania ====
- Prime Seal Island, Tasmania

==== Western Australia ====
- Seal Island (Albany, Western Australia), in the Great Southern region
- Seal Island (St Alouarn Islands), in the South West region
- Seal Island (Houtman Abrolhos), in Houtman Abrolhos chain
- Seal Island (Hopetoun, Western Australia), in Goldfields–Esperance region
- Seal Island (Shoalwater, Western Australia), in the Shoalwater Islands Marine Park

==== Victoria ====
- Seal Island (Victoria), off Wilsons Promontory
- Seal Rocks (Victoria), off Phillip Island

=== Europe ===
- Seal Island is a local name for the largest of The Carracks, a small group of islands off Cornwall, United Kingdom

=== North America ===
- Machias Seal Island, in disputed waters in the Gulf of Maine near the US–Canada border

==== Canada ====
- Seal Island (Nova Scotia), off the southwestern tip of Cape Sable Island
- Seal Island Bridge, connecting Boularderie Island with Cape Breton Island in Nova Scotia, Canada

==== Caribbean ====
- Seal Island, Anguilla, in the Seal island Reef System Marine Park

==== United States ====
- Seal Island Historic District, on the islands of St. George and St. Paul in the Bering Sea of Alaska
- Seal Islands (Aleutians East), in the Bering Sea, close to Bristol Bay, Alaska, U.S.
- Seal Islands (California), a pair of islands in Suisun Bay at the mouth of the Sacramento-San Joaquin River Delta
- Seal Island National Wildlife Refuge, an island off the coast of the U.S. state of Maine

== Media ==
- Seal Island (film) (1948), directed by James Algar and produced by Walt Disney
- Seal Island (radio drama), a Scottish radio play by Ewen MacGregor

== See also ==
- East Seal Dog Island, an uninhabited islet of the British Virgin Islands
- Little Seal Dog Island or West Seal Dog Island, an uninhabited islet of the British Virgin Islands
- Ile des Phoques, an island off Tasmania
- Machias Seal Island an island in the Atlantic Ocean claimed by Canada and the United States
- Robben Island, an island in Table Bay, off South Africa
- Seal Bay (disambiguation)
- Seal Rock (disambiguation)
