= Rabbit Rock (Bass Strait) =

Small island of Victoria, Australia

- Location within South Gippsland Shire

Geography
- Location: Bass Strait
- Coordinates: 38°54′52″S 146°29′20″E
- Area: 1.3 ha (3.2 acres)
- Length: 160 m (520 ft)
- Width: 100 m (300 ft)
- Highest elevation: 15 m (49 ft)

Administration
- Australia
- State: Victoria

Rabbit Rock is a small, granite island 200 m off the north-eastern coast of Wilsons Promontory, Victoria, Australia. It is part of the Wilsons Promontory Islands Important Bird Area, identified as such by BirdLife International because of its importance for breeding seabirds.

== See also ==
- Rabbit Island (Bass Strait)
