= Seal Island (Albany, Western Australia) =

Island in Western Australia

Location of Seal Island near Albany, Western Australia (Note: There are five islands in Western Australia named Seal Island; see Seal Island (disambiguation) § Australia.)

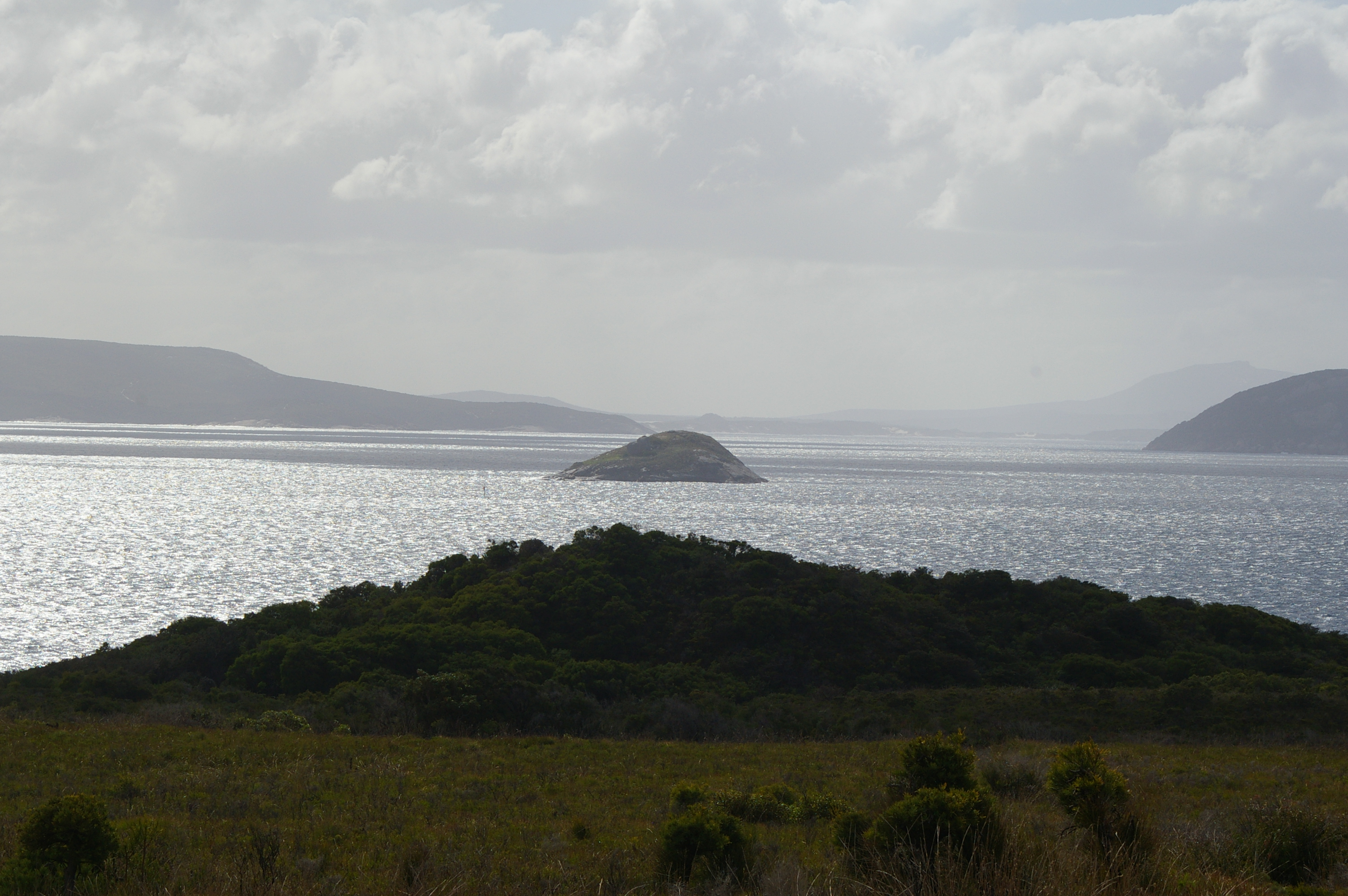
Seal Island from near Goode Beach

Seal Island in the Great Southern region of Western Australia (located at 35°4′31″S 117°58′29″E) is approximately 8.5 kilometres (5 mi) south-east of Albany and approximately 3 kilometres (2 mi) offshore from Frenchman Bay in King George Sound. It has a total area of 2.8 hectares (7 acres). The island is designated as a nature reserve (Reserve Number 32199).

The island is composed entirely of granite and is only accessible at the western end.

== History ==
George Vancouver named Seal Island in 1791 along with Breaksea Island, Michaelmas Island and other features around King George Sound.

Matthew Flinders landed on Seal Island during the voyage of HMS Investigator in 1801, searching for items that were reportedly left by Vancouver and leaving behind a bottle containing a parchment with details of their own arrival and departure.

HMAS Perth was scuttled behind Seal Island in 2001, and is now one of Western Australia's premier dive sites.
