= Seal Rock (Laguna Beach) =

Offshore rock and sea lion haul-out in Laguna Beach, California

- Reef / Islet
- Seal Rock as seen in March 2008
- Interactive map of Seal Rock
- Coordinates: 33°32′38″N 117°48′13″W
- Location: Laguna Beach, California
- Part of: Laguna Beach State Marine Reserve
- Water bodies: Pacific Ocean
- Highest elevation: 15–20 feet (4.6–6.1 m)
- Designation: Protected wildlife sanctuary

Seal Rock is an offshore rocky outcrop and natural marine landmark located approximately 120 yd (110 m) off the coast of Crescent Bay in Laguna Beach, California. Known primarily as a major resting site and haul-out area for California sea lions and harbor seals, the formation is a key feature of the Laguna Beach coastline and a prominent dive location within the Laguna Beach State Marine Reserve.

== Geography and wildlife ==
Seal Rock lies off the northern point of Crescent Bay, a sandy cove about one-quarter mile (0.4 km) long where Cliff Drive meets Pacific Coast Highway at the north end of Laguna Beach. Rather than a single stack, Seal Rock is a tight cluster of reefs that break the surface in several places. The main formation is divided into two rocks. The western rock protrudes 10–15 feet (3.0–4.6 m) above the surface, while the eastern rock sits higher at 15–20 feet (4.6–6.1 m).

In addition to the seals and sea lions that call the rock home, brown pelicans, cormorants and seagulls often can be found atop the rock.

== Protected status ==
The coastline and offshore waters of Laguna Beach were designated marine protected areas in 2012. The Laguna Beach State Marine Reserve, which runs for more than 4 miles (6.4 km), prohibits the taking of any living marine resources. The City of Laguna Beach likewise prohibits taking or collecting rocks, shells or marine life at Crescent Bay and states that swimmers and kayakers are not allowed on Seal Rock and should stay away from marine mammals in the area.

== See also ==
- Laguna Beach State Marine Reserve
- Crystal Cove State Marine Conservation Area
- Seal Rocks (San Francisco)
