= Notch Island =

Island in Victoria, Australia

- Location within Victoria
- Etymology: notched appearance

Geography
- Location: Bass Strait
- Coordinates: 38°56′25″S 146°40′33″E
- Area: 10 ha (25 acres)
- Length: 600 m (2000 ft)
- Width: 260 m (850 ft)
- Highest elevation: 38 m (125 ft)

Administration
- Australia
- State: Victoria

Notch Island is a small granite island in the Seal Islands group approximately 20 km east of Wilsons Promontory, Victoria, Australia. It is part of the Wilsons Promontory Islands Important Bird Area, identified as such by BirdLife International because of its importance for breeding seabirds.
