= Great Glennie Island =

Island in Victoria, Australia

- Location within South Gippsland Shire
- Etymology: George Glennie, by James Grant in Lady Nelson (1800)

Geography
- Location: Bass Strait
- Coordinates: 39°5′6″S 146°13′52″E
- Area: 138 ha (340 acres)
- Length: 3 km (1.9 mi)
- Width: 0.6 km (0.37 mi)
- Highest elevation: 140 m (460 ft)

Administration
- Australia
- State: Victoria

Great Glennie Island is a small, rugged, granite island in the Glennie group of islands off the west coast of Wilsons Promontory, Victoria, Australia. It is part of the Wilsons Promontory Islands Important Bird Area, identified as such by BirdLife International because of its importance for breeding seabirds.

== History ==
The island was sighted by Lieutenant James Grant, in Lady Nelson, on 10 December 1800 and named "after Mr. George Glennie, a particular friend of Captain Schank’s, to whom I was under personal obligations".
