= Wattle Island (Victoria) =

Island in Victoria, Australia

- Location within South Gippsland Shire

Geography
- Location: Wilsons Promontory
- Coordinates: 39°08′25″S 146°21′41″E
- Area: 21.7 ha (54 acres)
- Length: 1,050 m (3440 ft)
- Width: 350 km (217 mi)
- Highest elevation: 82 m (269 ft)

Administration
- Australia
- State: Victoria

Wattle Island, is a small, granite island located approximately 0.5 kilometres (0.31 mi) south of Wilsons Promontory in Victoria, Australia.

The island is within Wilsons Promontory National Park. The surrounding waters to the mean high-water mark are within Wilsons Promontory Marine National Park. It is part of the Wilsons Promontory Islands Important Bird Area, identified as such by BirdLife International because of its importance for breeding seabirds.
