= TSS Kanowna =

Coordinates: 39°18′36″S 146°07′48″E

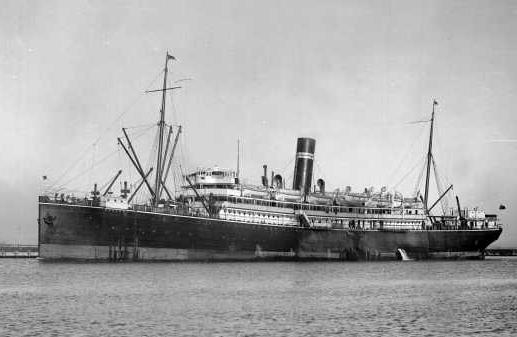
- An undated photograph of Kanowna

History

Australia
- Name: Kanowna
- Operator: Australian United Steam Navigation Company
- Route: Sydney to Fremantle
- Builder: William Denny and Brothers, Dumbarton, Scotland
- Fate: Ran aground and sank, 19 February 1929

General characteristics
- Tonnage: 6,993 tons
- Length: 126 metres (413 ft)

TSS Kanowna, was an Australian steamer built during 1902. The 6,993-ton, 126-metre (413 ft) long Kanowna was constructed by William Denny and Brothers of Dumbarton, Scotland, and had a twin screw design.

== Operational history ==
Kanowna was operated by the Australian United Steam Navigation Company (AUSNC), and it served the Sydney to Fremantle route.

A 1914 photograph of Kanowna in Cairns

During August and September 1914, Kanowna was requisitioned by the Australian military to transport 1,000 soldiers to German New Guinea as part of the Australian Naval and Military Expeditionary Force. Sailing late from Townsville on 8 August, the ship was forced to anchor off Thursday Island until 16 August, and did not arrive off Port Moresby until 6 September. The expeditionary force sailed the next day for Rabaul, but Kanowna fell behind the rest of the convoy, with the ship's master signalling to HMAS Sydney that his crew had mutinied: the boiler stokers and firemen had stopped work. In Arthur Jose's Royal Australian Navy-focused volume of the Official History of Australia in the War of 1914–1918, he claims that the mutiny was because these men refused to leave Australian waters, but Tom Frame and Kevin Baker state in Mutiny! that this is incorrect; the troopship was on short rations of food and water because of the delays sailing north and only minimal resupply in Port Moresby, but the stokers and firemen were requesting more water to remain hydrated in the hot boilerrooms and to wash off coal grime, and refused to work until this demand was met. The workers were taken into the custody of a party of soldiers, and the force's commander ordered Kanowna to return to Townsville, with soldiers volunteering to keep the ship running. The Australian Commonwealth Naval Board conducted an inquiry into the mutiny, even though as a civilian vessel, Kanowna technically wasn't under their jurisdiction. The state of the supplies was seen as a major contributing factor to the sailors' actions. Kanowna was returned to her owners on 21 September.

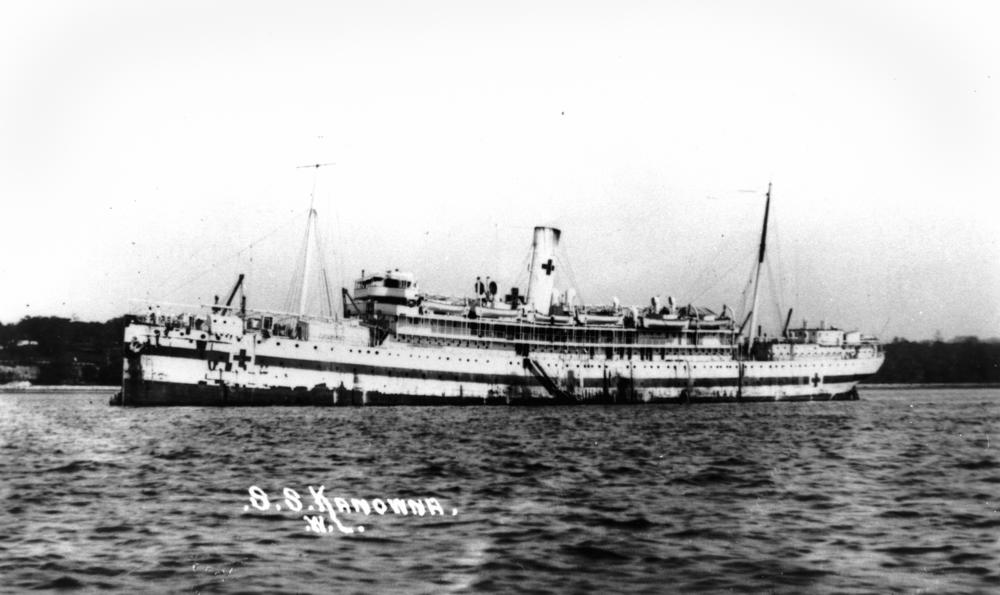
Kanowna in hospital ship livery

On 1 June 1915, the vessel was requisitioned again for military service. Kanowna transported soldiers and supplies to Egypt, then made for England, where she was modified for use as a hospital ship. After completion, Kanowna could carry 452 wounded in cots, along with a medical staff of 88 in addition to her regular crew. Sailing in September, Kanowna was used to transport Royal Army Medical Corps personnel to locations throughout the Mediterranean, then collected wounded Australian personnel and transported them home. She would make a total of 10 voyages between Australia and England in the next three years, although some runs were made to England with British wounded. In May 1917, the unrestricted submarine warfare campaign forced the ship to sail around Africa instead of through the Mediterranean: the nurses and medical staff were transported overland from Durban to London, and used to supplement hospital personnel until Kanowna arrived in July. In October 1918, after the war's end, the hospital ship was sent to collect 900 British and Commonwealth prisoners-of-war that had been interred in Turkey. Kanowna was returned to the AUSNC on 29 July 1919, and she resumed passenger and cargo service.

== Fate ==
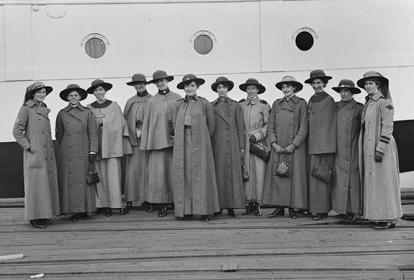
Twelve nurses aboard Kanowna, to service the hospital ship

On 18 February 1929, Kanowna ran into rocks near Cleft Island while on a voyage between Sydney and Melbourne. Passengers were transferred to SS Mackarra. Although it was initially thought that Kanowna could be saved by beaching, the ship's boilers had gone out. The crew were taken aboard SS Dumosa, and Kanowna sank the following morning. A court of inquiry found the ship's master at fault for the loss, as he did not slow his ship or exercise due caution in the foggy conditions.

The exact location of the shipwreck was unknown until 2005. On 23 April, four divers found a shipwreck 50 kilometres (31 mi) into Bass Strait and submerged in approximately 80 metres (260 ft) of water, which was believed to be the former merchant ship. A more detailed inspection of the wreck site on 8 May allowed the divers to match the wreck with drawings of Kanowna.

== See also ==
- List of ships built by William Denny and Brothers

== Other sources ==
- Frame, Tom; Baker, Kevin (2000). Mutiny! Naval Insurrections in Australia and New Zealand. St. Leonards, NSW: Allen & Unwin. ISBN 1-86508-351-8. OCLC 46882022.
- Jose, Arthur W. (1941) [1928]. The Royal Australian Navy 1914–1918. The Official History of Australia in the War of 1914–1918. Vol. IX (9th ed.). Sydney, NSW: Angus and Robertson. OCLC 215763279.
