= McHugh Island (Victoria) =

Island in Victoria, Australia

- Location within South Gippsland Shire

Geography
- Location: Bass Strait
- Coordinates: 39°6′55″S 146°14′32″E
- Area: 9.2 ha (23 acres)
- Length: 425 m (1394 ft)
- Width: 270 m (890 ft)
- Highest elevation: 65 m (213 ft)

Administration
- Australia
- State: Victoria

McHugh Island is a small, rugged, granite island in the Glennie group of islands off the west coast of Wilsons Promontory, Victoria, Australia. It is part of the Wilsons Promontory Islands Important Bird Area, identified as such by BirdLife International because of its importance for breeding seabirds.
