= Harald Kristian Dannevig =

Norwegian-born fisheries expert (1871–1914)

Harald Kristian Dannevig (1871 – December 1914) was a Norwegian-born Australian fisheries expert who disappeared at sea.

== Career ==
In 1902 he was appointed by the government of New South Wales, Australia as superintendent of fisheries investigations and fish hatcheries.

In 1908 he became Commonwealth Director of Fisheries and identified large trawlable fishing grounds around south-eastern Australia.

== Disappearance and aftermath ==
Dannevig was lost at sea on the fisheries investigation ship F.I.S. Endeavour, which left Macquarie Island on 3 December 1914 and was never seen again. The ship was presumed by a marine court of inquiry to have foundered on 5 December 1914.

== Legacy ==
Dannevig Island off Wilsons Promontory is named after him.

== See also ==
- List of people who disappeared mysteriously at sea
