= West Moncoeur Island =

Island in Tasmania, Australia

- Location within Tasmania

Geography
- Location: Bass Strait
- Coordinates: 39°14′0″S 146°30′20″E
- Area: 9 ha (22 acres)

Administration
- Australia
- State: Tasmania

West Moncoeur Island is a granite island, ringed by steep cliffs, with an area of 9.18 ha, in south-eastern Australia. It is part of Tasmania’s Rodondo Group, lying in northern Bass Strait south of Wilsons Promontory in Victoria. It is a nature reserve.

The island was sighted by Lieutenant James Grant on 9 December 1800 from the survey brig HMS Lady Nelson and named after "Captain Moncur of the Royal navy".

== Fauna ==
Recorded breeding seabird and wader species include short-tailed shearwater, fairy prion, common diving-petrel, Pacific gull, and sooty oystercatcher. The island is part of the Wilsons Promontory Islands Important Bird Area, identified as such by BirdLife International because of its importance for breeding seabirds. The metallic skink is present. The island holds an important breeding colony of Australian fur seals, with about 250 pups being born there annually.
