= East Moncoeur Island =

Island in Tasmania, Australia

- Location within Tasmania

Geography
- Location: Bass Strait
- Coordinates: 39°13′S 146°32′E
- Area: 14 ha (35 acres)

Administration
- Australia
- State: Tasmania

East Moncoeur Island is a granite island, with an area of 14 ha.

It is part of Tasmania’s Rodondo Group, lying in northern Bass Strait south of Wilsons Promontory in Victoria, in south-eastern Australia.

The island was sighted by Lieutenant James Grant on 9 December 1800 from the survey brig HMS Lady Nelson and named after "Captain Moncur of the Royal navy".

== Fauna ==
Recorded breeding seabird and wader species include little penguin, short-tailed shearwater, fairy prion, common diving-petrel, Pacific gull, silver gull and sooty oystercatcher. The island is part of the Wilsons Promontory Islands Important Bird Area, identified as such by BirdLife International because of its importance for breeding seabirds. Reptiles present include the metallic skink, Bougainville's skink and White's skink.
