= Cliffy Island =

Island in Victoria, Australia

- Location within Victoria

Geography
- Location: Bass Strait
- Coordinates: 38°57′02″S 146°42′16″E
- Area: 8 ha (20 acres)
- Length: 370 m (1210 ft)
- Width: 260 km (162 mi)
- Highest elevation: 43 m (141 ft)

Administration
- Australia
- State: Victoria

Cliffy Island is an island peak, of a submerged granite mountain approximately 20 km off the coast of Victoria, Australia. It is the home of the Cliffy Island Lighthouse which is only accessible by helicopter. The island is part of the Wilsons Promontory Islands Important Bird Area, identified as such by BirdLife International because of its importance for breeding seabirds.

Travelling around the island by boat, remnants of what appear to be an old jetty, train tracks and a large engine for dragging supplies up the steep incline to the lighthouse keepers compound are clearly visible. The island and those that surround it are a haven for many seals.
