= Dannevig Island =

Island in Victoria, Australia

- Location within South Gippsland Shire
- Etymology: Harald Kristian Dannevig

Geography
- Location: Bass Strait
- Coordinates: 39°6′20″S 146°14′16″E
- Area: 19.6 ha (48 acres)
- Length: 960 m (3150 ft)
- Width: 390 m (1280 ft)

Administration
- Australia
- State: Victoria

Dannevig Island is a small, rugged, granite island in the Glennie group of islands off the west coast of Wilsons Promontory, Victoria, Australia. It is part of the Wilsons Promontory Islands Important Bird Area, identified as such by BirdLife International because of its importance for breeding seabirds.

The island is named after Harald Kristian Dannevig.
