= Cliffy Island Lighthouse =

Lighthouse in Victoria, Australia

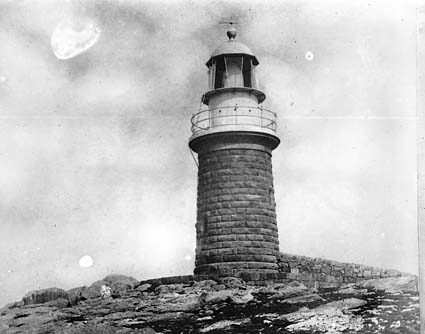
- Cliffy Island Lighthouse, 1917
- Location: Bass Strait; 17 nmi S of Port Albert, Victoria; Australia
- Coordinates: 38°57′02.6″S 146°42′20.5″E

Tower
- Constructed: 1884
- Foundation: granite basement
- Construction: granite tower
- Automated: 1971
- Height: 12 metres (39 ft)
- Shape: cylindrical tower with balcony and lantern
- Markings: unpainted tower, white lantern and gallery
- Power source: solar power
- Operator: Australian Maritime Safety Authority

Light
- Focal height: 52 metres (171 ft)
- Lens: Fresnel lens
- Intensity: 15,300 cd
- Range: 18 nautical miles (33 km; 21 mi)
- Characteristic: Fl W 5s.

The Cliffy Island Lighthouse is located atop Cliffy Island, a steep-sided island which is the summit of a granite submarine mountain in the Bass Strait. Cliffy Island is located about 32 kilometres directly south of Port Albert, and roughly 38 kilometres to the northeast of Wilsons Promontory Lighthouse in Victoria, Australia. The lighthouse warns approaching vessels of rocks in Bass Strait by emitting a flash of white light every five seconds. The focal plane of the lightsource and Fresnel lens is situated 52 metres above sea level. The site is managed by the Victoria Department of Conservation and Natural Resources, while the lighthouse itself is operated by the Australian Maritime Safety Authority (AMSA). The island is accessible only by helicopter, and the entire site is closed to the public.

== History ==
The Cliffy Island Lighthouse was constructed on site in 1884 from granite quarried on the island. In addition to the lighthouse, there was a stone cottage for the head lighthouse keeper and his family. This structure was nearly identical to the one at Cape Nelson, as they were both built in the same year, probably from the same set of blueprints. There was also a duplex wooden structure that served as the residence of the two assistant keepers and their families. The keeper's houses were demolished in 1971, when the lighthouse was automated; the stone walls that surrounded the houses remain.

== Adjacent Lighthouses ==
- South West - Wilsons Promontory Lighthouse
- North East - Lighthouse at Cape Conran Coastal Park
- North East - Point Hicks Lighthouse

== See also ==
- List of lighthouses in Australia
