= Norman Island (Victoria) =

Island in Victoria, Australia

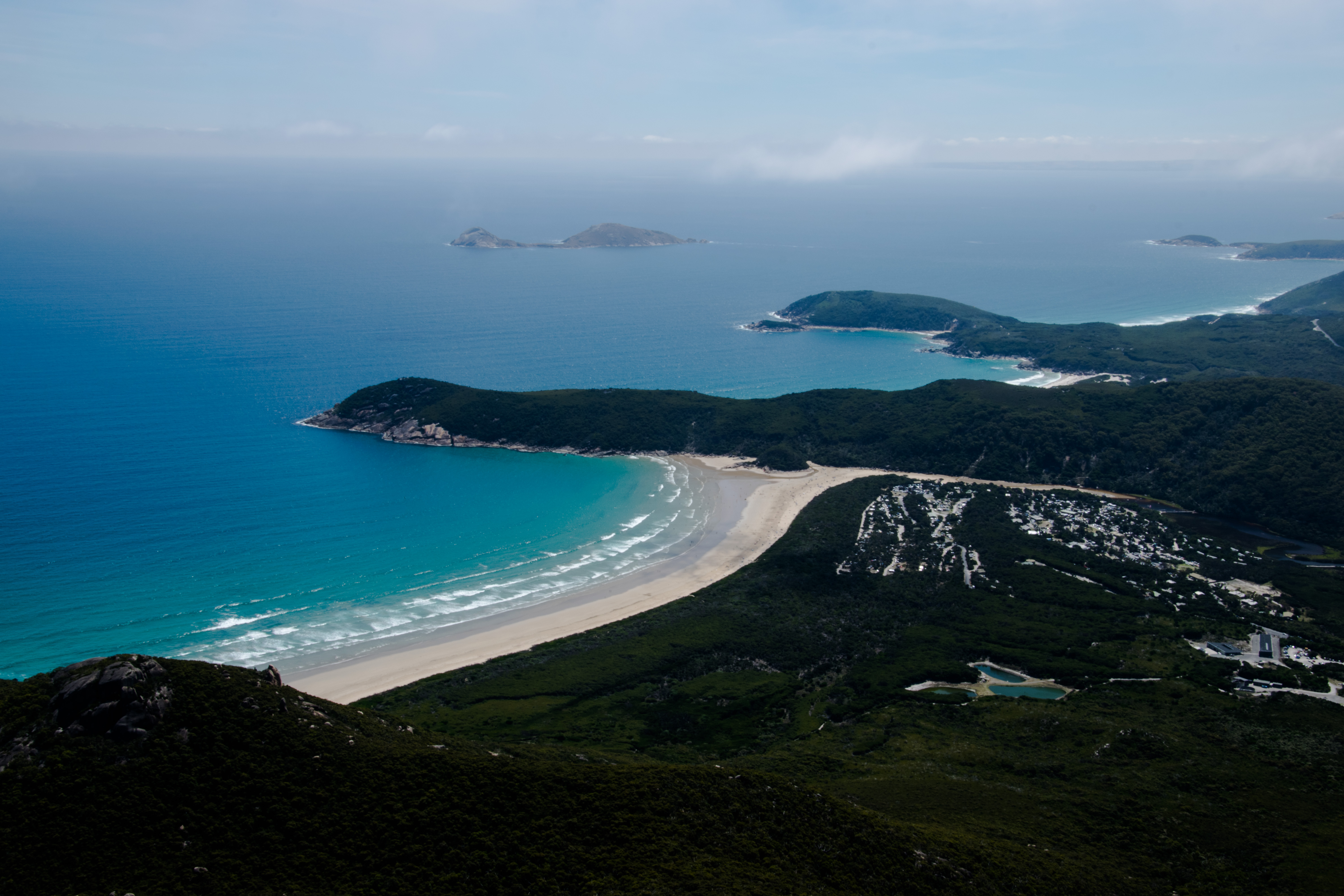
- Norman Island in the distance seen from the summit of Mt Oberon

- Location within South Gippsland Shire
- Etymology: William Henry Norman

Geography
- Location: Wilsons Promontory
- Coordinates: 39°01′17″S 146°14′29″E
- Area: 48 ha (120 acres)
- Length: 1,400 m (4600 ft)
- Width: 6.5 km (4.04 mi)
- Highest elevation: 96 m (315 ft)

Administration
- Australia
- State: Victoria

Norman Island, an oceanic island, is located approximately 4 kilometres (2.5 mi) west of Picnic Point, Wilsons Promontory in Victoria, Australia.

The island, to the mean low-water mark, is part of the Wilsons Promontory National Park and is proclaimed as a Remote and Natural Area under the National Parks Act. The surrounding waters to a distance of 300 m from the mean low-water mark are part of Wilsons Promontory Marine Park. The island is part of the Wilsons Promontory Islands Important Bird Area, identified as such by BirdLife International because of its importance for breeding seabirds.

The island is named after Captain William Henry Norman, who brought Sir Charles Hotham to Melbourne in Queen of the South in 1854, and later served as commander of HMVS Victoria.
