= Cleft Island (Victoria) =

Granite island in Victoria, Australia

Nickname: Skull Rock
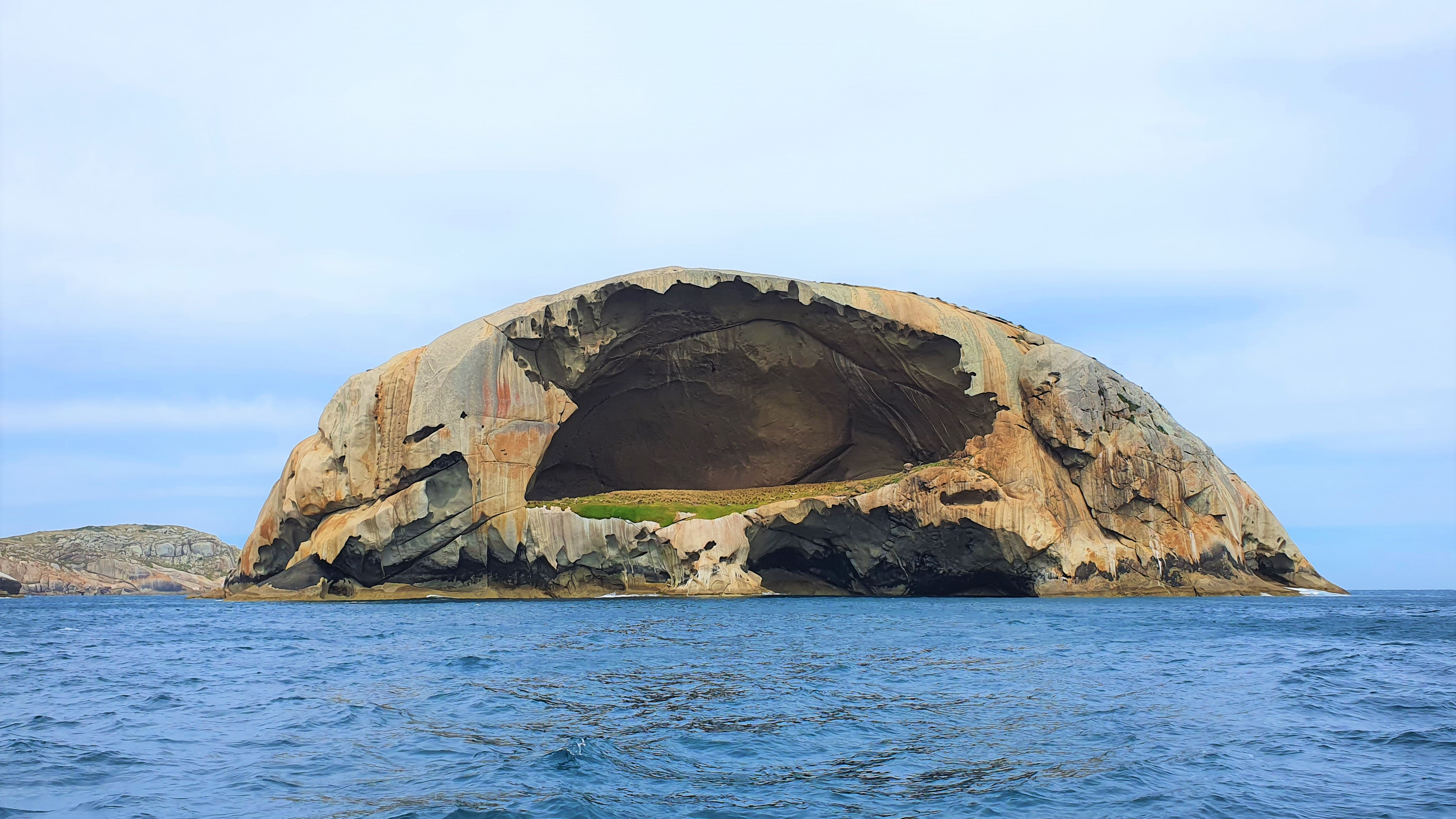
- Cleft Island (Skull Rock) - Cavity

- Location within South Gippsland Shire

Geography
- Location: Bass Strait
- Coordinates: 39°9′27″S 146°17′42″E
- Length: 300 m (1000 ft)
- Width: 200 m (700 ft)

Administration
- Australia
- State: Victoria

Cleft Island, also known as Skull Rock, is a small, rugged, granite island in the Anser group of islands to the south-west of Wilsons Promontory, Victoria, Australia.

The island is within Wilsons Promontory National Park. The surrounding waters to the mean high-water mark are within Wilsons Promontory Marine National Park. It is part of the Wilsons Promontory Islands Important Bird Area, identified as such by BirdLife International because of its importance for breeding seabirds.

It is partially hollowed out by ancient waves, creating a cave 130 metres (430 ft) wide and 60 metres (200 ft) tall.

Only 9 people have ventured into the cavern, finding "old cannon balls left by passing ships practicing their aim". Adventurers had to land on the top of the rock by helicopter, then they shimmied down ropes to gain entrance to the cave..
