= Wilsons Promontory Islands Important Bird Area =

Coordinates: 39°06′38″S 146°18′07″E

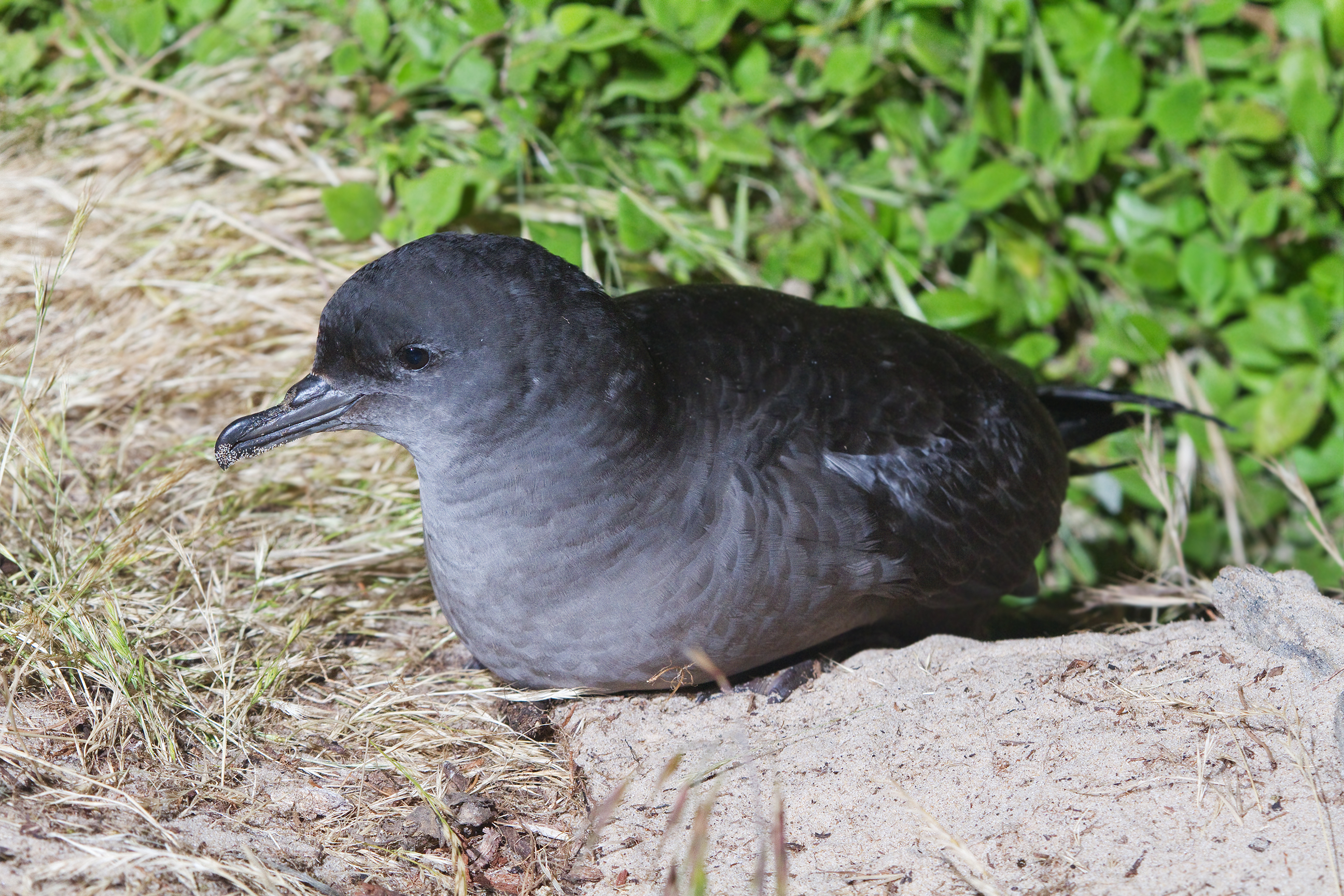
The IBA is an important breeding site for short-tailed shearwaters

The Wilsons Promontory Islands Important Bird Area comprises a loose cluster of 19 small, granite islands, with a collective area of 658 ha, scattered around Wilsons Promontory in the state of Victoria, south-eastern Australia. The three southernmost islands are part of the state of Tasmania. They are important for their breeding seabirds.

== Description ==
The 16 islands under Victorian jurisdiction are Shellback, Norman, Great Glennie, Dannevig, Citadel and McHugh (all of which are part of Wilsons Promontory Marine Park); Cleft, Kanowna, Anser and Wattle (all within Wilsons Promontory Marine National Park); Rabbit, Rag, Cliffy, Seal and Notch Islands, and Rabbit Rock. The three islands under Tasmanian jurisdiction are Rodondo and West Moncoeur (both of which are nature reserves), and East Moncoeur. The islands’ vegetation consists mainly of shrubland and tussock grassland.

== Birds ==
The islands have been identified as an Important Bird Area (IBA) by BirdLife International because they support 1% of the world's population of short-tailed shearwaters (with over 1.4 million nesting burrows), Pacific gulls (with about 450 breeding pairs) and possibly black-faced cormorants.
