= Seal Island (Victoria) =

Island in Victoria, Australia

- Location within Victoria
- Etymology: fur seal (Bass, 1798)

Geography
- Location: Bass Strait
- Coordinates: 38°55′30″S 146°39′45″E
- Area: 18 ha (44 acres)
- Length: 600 m (2000 ft)
- Width: 450 m (1480 ft)
- Highest elevation: 47 m (154 ft)

Administration
- Australia
- State: Victoria

Seal Island is a small granite island in the Seal Islands group approximately 15 km east of Wilsons Promontory, Victoria, Australia. It is part of the Wilsons Promontory Islands Important Bird Area, identified as such by BirdLife International because of its importance for breeding seabirds.

The island was named by George Bass in January 1798, after the Australian fur seals found nearby.
