= Wattle Island (Antarctica) =

Island in Enderby Land, Antarctica

Wattle Island (67°17′S 46°46′E) is a small island lying close to the coast and 6 nautical miles (11 km) east of Kirkby Head, Enderby Land. Plotted from air photos taken from ANARE (Australian National Antarctic Research Expeditions) aircraft in 1956. Wattle is the vernacular name given to over 400 species of Acacia found in different parts of Australia.

== See also ==
- List of Antarctic and sub-Antarctic islands
