= Laguna Beach State Marine Reserve =

Marine protected area in California

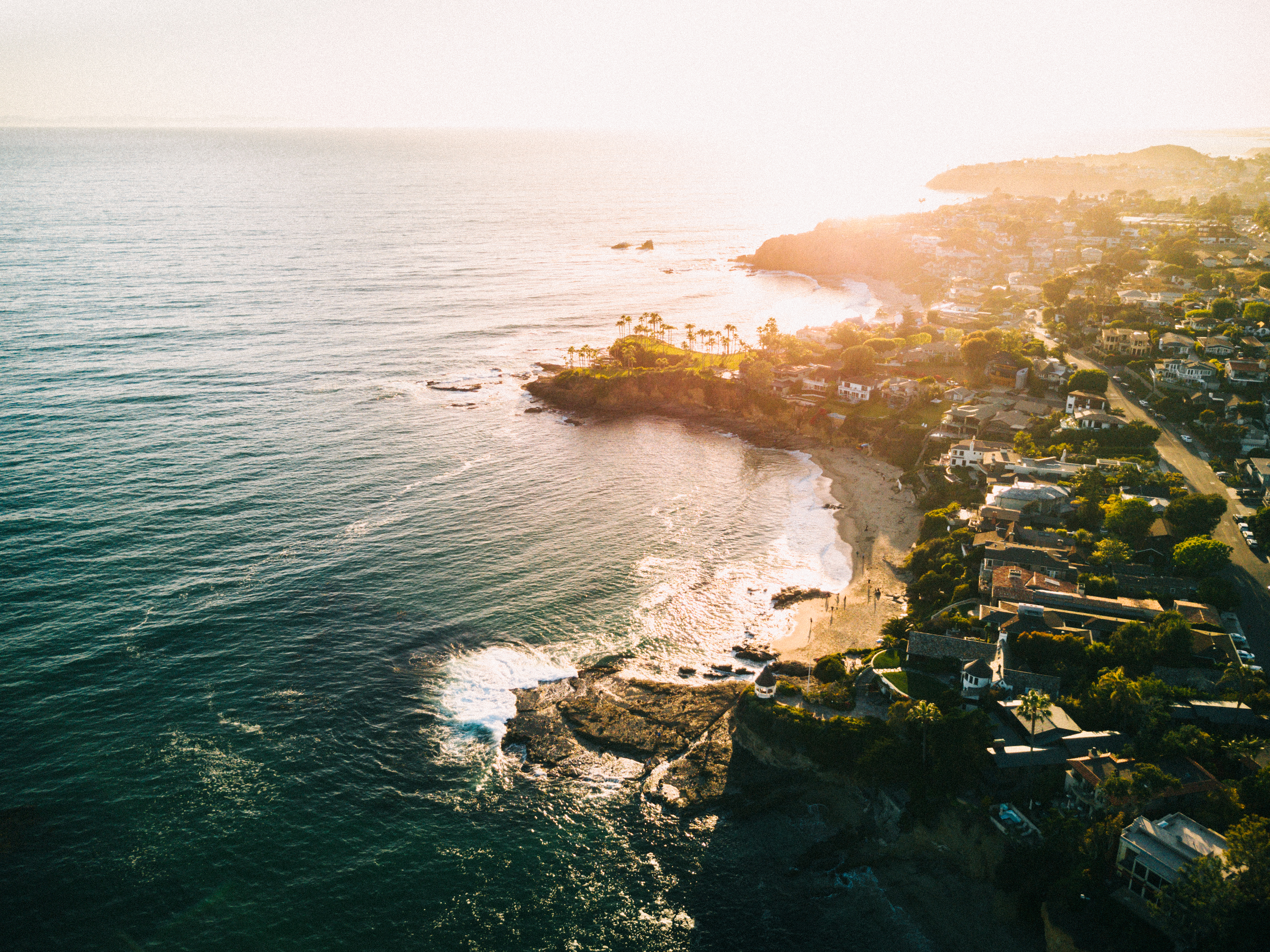
Laguna Beach

Laguna Beach State Marine Reserve (SMR) and Laguna Beach State Marine Conservation Area (SMCA) are two adjoining marine protected areas that extend offshore of Laguna Beach in Orange County on California’s south coast. The SMR covers 6.27 square miles, and the SMCA covers an additional 3.44 square miles. These two MPAs are part of a four-MPA complex on the coast of southern Orange County. Each protects marine life by prohibiting or limiting the removal of marine wildlife from within its borders.

Both Laguna Beach SMR and Laguna Beach SMCA prohibit the take of all living marine resources. Laguna Beach SMCA includes the following allowance: Take of all living marine resources is prohibited except operation and maintenance of artificial structures and facilities, beach grooming, maintenance dredging, and habitat restoration inside the conservation area per any required federal, state and local permits, or as otherwise authorized by the department. Please see the following for official details on boundaries, regulations and other information:

== History ==
Laguna Beach SMR and SMCA are two of 36 new marine protected areas adopted by the California Fish and Game Commission in December, 2010 during the third phase of the Marine Life Protection Act Initiative. The MLPAI is a collaborative public process to create a statewide network of protected areas along California's coastline.

The south coast's new marine protected areas were designed by local divers, fishermen, conservationists and scientists who comprised the South Coast Regional Stakeholder Group. Their job was to design a network of protected areas that would preserve sensitive sea life and habitats while enhancing recreation, study and education opportunities.

The south coast marine protected areas went into effect in 2012.

== Geography and natural features ==
These two MPAs are a marine protected area complex that extend offshore of Laguna Beach on California's south coast.

Laguna Beach SMR Boundary: This area is bounded by the mean high tide line and straight lines connecting the following points in the order listed:

1. 33°33.233′N 117°49.200′W
2. 33°30.800′N 117°49.200′W and
3. 33°30.800′N 117°45.631′W.

Laguna SMCA Boundary: This area is bounded by the mean high tide line and straight lines connecting the following points in the order listed:

1. 33°30.800′N 117°45.631′W
2. 33°30.800′N 117°49.200′W
3. 33°30.050′N 117°49.200′W and
4. 33°30.050′N 117°44.771′W.

== Habitat and wildlife ==
This MPA cluster includes examples of southern California's world class variety of rocky and sandy habitats, including diverse rocky intertidal, shallow kelp reefs. This is an area of outstanding marine biodiversity, featuring outstanding diving, tide pooling and wildlife viewing.

== Recreation and nearby attractions ==
Spanning the scenic shoreline of south Orange County from south of Newport Beach to the Dana Point Harbor, the south Orange County MPA complexes sit amongst some of southern California's most visited coastal recreation amenities. Miles of sandy beaches, coves and points, and blufftop hiking trails are available for beachcombing, wading, surfing, snorkeling and kayaking. To the north, Crystal Cove State Beach abuts the Crystal Cove State Marine Conservation Area, providing access trails, interpretative signage and kiosks, along with restrooms and visitor facilities. Popular scuba diving and snorkeling spots also dot the State Park's coastline. Laguna Beach SMR sits among numerous sandy coves with dramatic rock formations and fascinating tidepools, along with famous surfing spots such as Aliso Beach, Doheney, and Salt Creek. Throughout this area, collecting living marine resources from the intertidal area is prohibited to preserve wildlife, while some fishing opportunities are available offshore along the Crystal Cove and Dana Point coastline outside the Laguna Beach SMR and SMCA.

Inland, both Crystal Cove State Park and Aliso Canyon Regional Park offer hiking and picnicking opportunities within their protected borders. Visitor services including fine dining and refreshments, lodging, museums and other visitor attractions abound within this urban and tourist-friendly area. The City of Laguna beach is a top southern California tourist attraction, hosting art galleries and beachside restaurants.

== Scientific monitoring ==
As specified by the Marine Life Protection Act, select marine protected areas along California's south coast are being monitored by scientists to track their effectiveness and learn more about ocean health. Similar studies in marine protected areas located off of the Santa Barbara Channel Islands have already detected gradual improvements in fish size and number.
