= Wilsons Promontory Marine National Park =

Protected area in Victoria, Australia

- IUCN category II (national park)
- Location within Victoria
- Location: Victoria
- Nearest city: Yanakie
- Coordinates: 39°10′S 146°20′E
- Area: 155 km^{2} (60 sq mi)
- Established: 2003
- Governing body: Parks Victoria
- Website: Official website

The Wilsons Promontory Marine National Park is a protected marine national park located in the South Gippsland region of Victoria, Australia. The 15,500-hectare (38,000-acre) marine park is situated off the southern tip of Wilsons Promontory and extends along the coastline from Norman Bay, near Tidal River, in the west around the southern tip of the promontory to Cape Wellington in the east. It extends offshore to the Glennie and Anser groups of offshore islands.

There are several neighbouring protected areas:

- Wilsons Promontory National Park covers the promontory and nearby offshore islands
- Wilsons Promontory Marine Park covers the ocean facing coastline of the northern section of the promontory, including Norman, Shellback, and Rabbit islands
- Wilsons Promontory Marine Reserve covers the waters adjacent to the Glennie group and between Cape Wellington and Refuge Cove
- Corner Inlet Marine National Park, Corner Inlet Marine and Coastal Park and Nooramunga Marine and Coastal Park protect much of Corner Inlet, to the north-east of the Promontory.
- Shallow Inlet Marine and Coastal Park covers Shallow Inlet to the north-west of the Promontory.
- Rodondo Island to the south is Tasmanian nature reserve

The national park surrounds some of the islands in the Wilsons Promontory Islands Important Bird Area.

== See also ==
- Protected areas of Victoria
- List of national parks of Australia
