= Shellback Island =

Island in Victoria, Australia

Shellabear Island
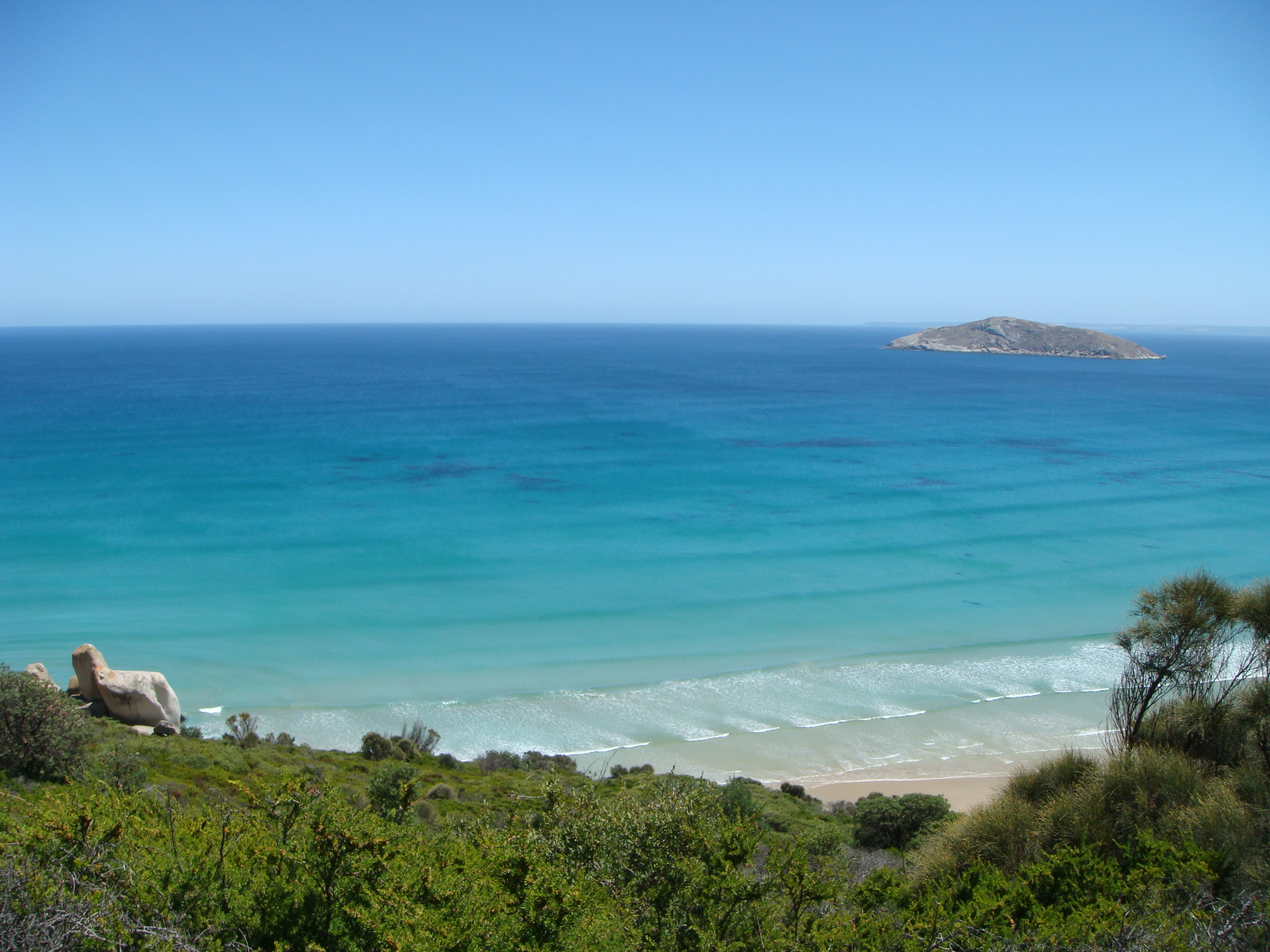
- Shellback Island

- Location within South Gippsland Shire

Geography
- Location: Bass Strait
- Coordinates: 38.9686°S 146.2279°E
- Area: 37 ha (91 acres)
- Length: 1,000 m (3000 ft)
- Width: 600 km (370 mi)
- Highest elevation: 109 m (358 ft)

Administration
- Australia
- State: Victoria

The Shellback Island, an oceanic island, is approximately 4 kilometres (2.5 mi) northwest of Darby Bay, off Wilsons Promontory in Victoria, Australia.

The island, to the mean low-water mark, is part of the Wilsons Promontory National Park and is proclaimed as a Remote and Natural Area under the National Parks Act. The surrounding waters to a distance of 300 m from the mean low-water mark are part of Wilsons Promontory Marine Park. The island is part of the Wilsons Promontory Islands Important Bird Area, identified as such by BirdLife International because of its importance for breeding seabirds.
