= Rabbit Island (Bass Strait) =

Island of Victoria, Australia

- Location within South Gippsland Shire

Geography
- Location: Bass Strait
- Coordinates: 38°54′42″S 146°30′39″E
- Area: 30 ha (74 acres)
- Length: 866 m (2841 ft)
- Width: 466 m (1529 ft)
- Highest elevation: 59 m (194 ft)

Administration
- Australia
- State: Victoria

Rabbit Island is a small, granite island 1.6 km off the north-eastern coast of Wilsons Promontory, Victoria, Australia.

The island, to the mean low-water mark, is part of the Wilsons Promontory National Park and is proclaimed as a Remote and Natural Area under the National Parks Act. The surrounding waters to a distance of 300 m from the mean low-water mark are part of Wilsons Promontory Marine Park. The island is part of the Wilsons Promontory Islands Important Bird Area, identified as such by BirdLife International because of its importance for breeding seabirds.

The island was named in 1842 by Captain John Lort Stokes after the numerous rabbits, descendants of those left by sealers to provide a food supply for sailors.
