= Walhalla railway line =

Former railway line in Victoria, Australia

Coordinates: 37°59′36″S 146°21′57″E

Walhalla
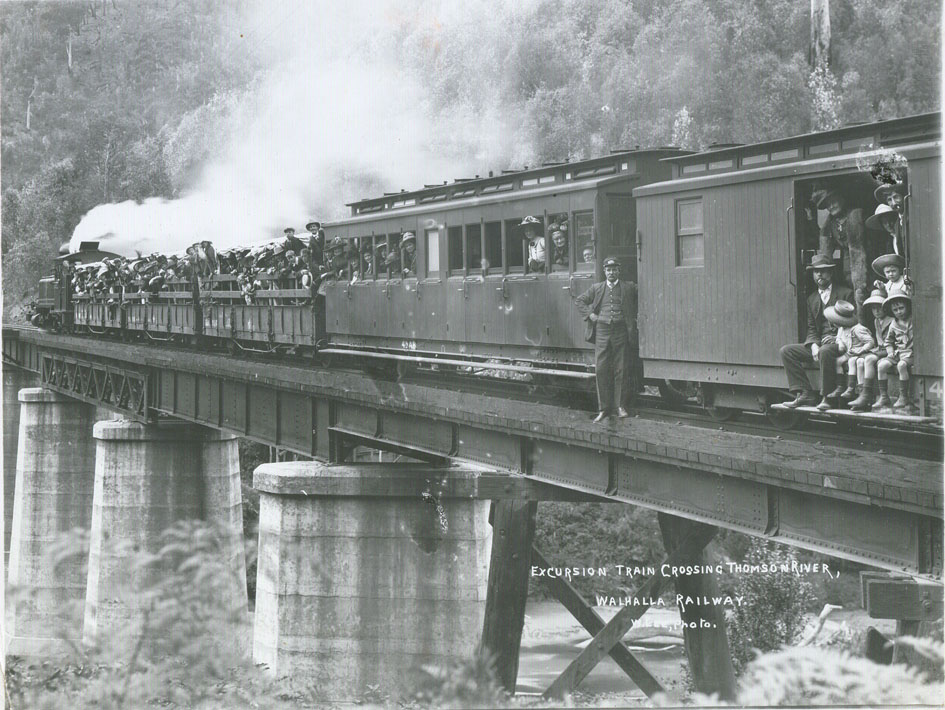
- Excursion train crossing Thomson River (Victoria) ca 1910

Overview
- Status: Tourist railway
- Locale: Gippsland
- Termini: Moe; Walhalla
- Stations: 11

Service
- Type: Mixed passenger/goods service

History
- Work began: 1904
- Opened: 1908 3 May 1910
- Completed: 1910
- Closed: 25 June 1954
- Reopened: April 1994

Technical
- Line length: 26.5 miles (42.6 km)
- Number of tracks: Single track
- Track gauge: 2 ft 6 in (762 mm)

The Walhalla railway line was a 2 ft 6 in (762 mm) narrow gauge railway located in Gippsland, Victoria, Australia. The line ran from Moe to the former gold-mining town and popular tourist destination of Walhalla.

Construction began in 1904, though work on the project progressed slowly and the line was not completed until 1910. It was the last of the four narrow gauge lines of the Victorian Railways to be opened due to the difficult and mountainous terrain to be contended with. The railway was expected to be a boon for the town, which was in a state of economic and population decline due to gold mining operations becoming increasingly uneconomical, with the largest gold mining company closing in 1915. However, the arrival of the railway did not save the town. The line closed in sections from 1944 to 1954.

== History ==
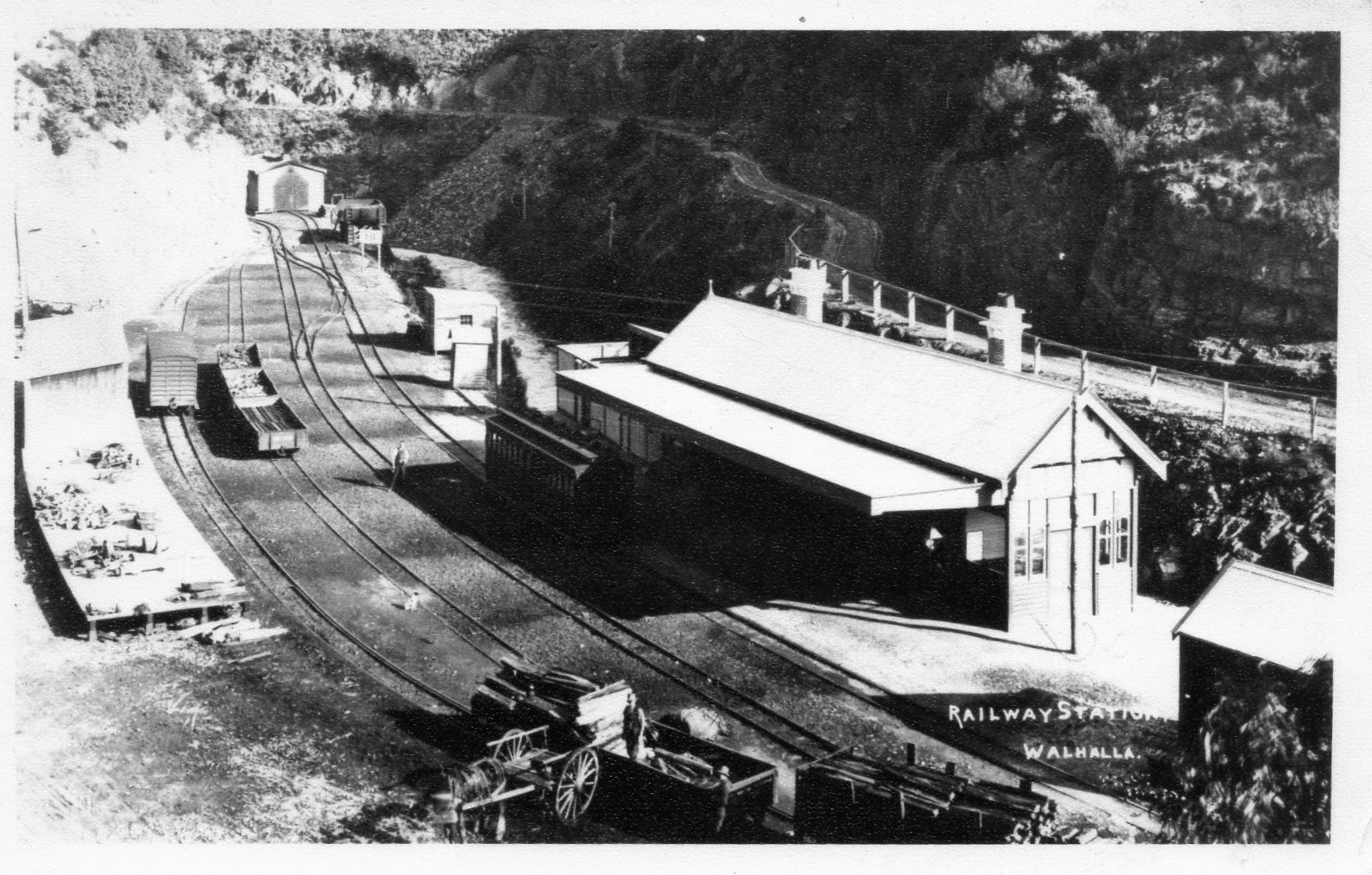
Walhalla railway station, c.1910

=== Before the railway ===
The region of Tanjil County in Central Gippsland was a significant metals mining district in the mid 1860s, with significant gold mines and Victoria's first copper mine opening in 1865. The Gippsland forests were generally considered impassable, so extracted ores would be loaded into bullock wagons and taken to Port Albert or Sale then shipped to Melbourne, while boilers, crushing equipment and all sorts of other heavy mining equipment had to be brought back along 60 miles (97 km) or more of dirt tracks, by teams of up to 20 animals. By the 1870s about 100 gold mining enterprises had been registered, and the Long Tunnel Mine and its rival the Long Tunnel Extended Mine were registering gold yields of up to 10 oz/long ton (280 g/t). In total, the mines of Walhalla extracted 54 long tons (55 t) of gold.

The town of Walhalla had grown to 1,500 residents by 1870 and 2,500 residents by 1886, by which time there were two daily passengers trains from Melbourne to Sale connecting with Walhalla via horse-drawn mail coaches at Moe and Traralgon three days per week each; travel between the railway and Walhalla by either route would take a full day. The Walhalla Steam Tramway League was formed in September 1883, following the opening of the Heyfield line, and in 1888 the local Member of Parliament, Albert Harris, first officially proposed a railway to Walhalla.

By 1890 the coach service had increased to daily service from each of Moe and Traralgon, driving speculation for a railway connection. In 1896 the Parliamentary Standing Committee reported that the population of Walhalla Shire was 3,396, including 2,616 in the town itself. The coach to Walhalla conveyed 10,221 passengers in 1898-99, with three return trips per day.

=== Surveying the route ===
In 1887 a range of surveys were conducted, looking at linking Walhalla to the existing Gippsland railway with a branch line from various places; these surveys produced routes between 25 and 32 miles (40 and 51 km), at a cost in the range of £14,647 to £15,955 per mile. The 1890 Railway Construction Bill authorised a line from Moe to Moondarra, though this wasn't built. The expected total cost for a line of 27 miles 13 chains (43.7 km) with ruling gradient of 1 in 30 and the sharpest curve at 5 chains (330 ft; 100 m) was £438,299/17/2. Another survey in 1895 looked at a possible 2 ft (610 mm) gauge line, taking advantage of the narrow gauge's capacity to negotiate tighter-radius curves, although the Engineer-in-Chief of the Victorian Railways reported a strong distaste for the narrow gauge proposals and the Railway Commissioner flagged at the time that the savings in cost for construction would "not possibly compensate for the delays in transit, transfer charges, additional cost of handling, and the general inconvenience necessarily involved in breaking the gauge on such branch lines."

A report in May 1895 by the F. Rennick, Engineer-in-chief of the Victorian Railways, showed that while constructing the narrow gauge line would be significantly cheaper to initially build, very nearly all that saving would be consumed by the additional rolling stock for the line, transfer and maintenance equipment based at Moe with a final difference of only £1,315. Additionally, broad gauge trains with the wider loading gauge, more powerful locomotives and heavier axle loads would have about four times the capacity, while the cost per volume shifted would be half that of the narrow gauge. It is not clear where the proposal for a 1 in 20 slope on the broad gauge proposal came from and how that might have impacted the line's haulage capacity, but it does explain how the cost of construction had dropped from £438,299/17/2 in 1890; the land compensation elements were minor compared to the hundreds of thousands of pounds saved in reduced earthworks and bridges against the broad gauge proposal designed with 1 in 30 slopes. No railway in Victoria had a steeper gradient than 1 in 30 until the ramps to the Metro Tunnel opened in 2025, with a ruling gradient of 1 in 29. However, New South Wales's Camden railway line had grades as steep as 1 in 19, and was limited to very light loads for relatively powerful locomotives. Using that line as a proxy, it is likely that Victorian engines of the era, like the Y Class, with similarly-sized driving wheels and boiler pressure, on a slope like that would have been limited to something like 85 to 90 long tons (86 to 91 t); something like 5 to 10 loaded fixed-axle cars and wagons, or as few as two or three bogie vehicles.

Cost of surveyed line Moondarra-Walhalla in May 1895 Description of work, &e.	2 ft (610 mm) line, 8 mi 44 ch (13.8 km), 1 in 30 ruling gradient, 2 ch (40 m) curves						5 ft 3 in (1,600 mm) line, 7 mi 48 ch (12.2 km), 1 in 20 ruling gradient, 5 ch (100 m) curves					
Cost of surveyed line Moondarra-Walhalla in May 1895 Description of work, &e.	Cost			Total cost			Cost			Total cost		
Cost of surveyed line Moondarra-Walhalla in May 1895 Description of work, &e.	£	s	d	£	s	d	£	s	d	£	s	d
Land transfer expenses				100	0	0				100	0	0
Clearing, 8.55 miles (13.76 km) narrow gauge or 7.60 miles (12.23 km) broad gauge at £200				1,710	0	0				1,520	0	0
Fencing, none, except at dangerous points, 1 mile (1.6 km) at £45				45	0	0				45	0	0
Gates at station, &c.				18	0	0				18	0	0
Gate-houses for station and repairers, two £150				300	0	0				300	0	0
Cattle-pits at intersecting fences, two at £5 narrow gauge or £7 broad gauge				10	0	0				14	0	0
Earthworks in cuttings, 125,000 yd^{3} (96,000 m^{3}) narrow gauge or 186,000 yd^{3} (142,000 m^{3}) broad gauge at £-/1/3	7,812	10	0				11,625	0	0			
Earthworks in back or side cutting and side ditches to complete banks, 35,000 yd^{3} (27,000 m^{3}) narrow gauge or 55,000 yd^{3} (42,000 m^{3}) (Note: Broad gauge entry lists 52,000 cubic yards plus 3,000 cubic yards for side ditches.) broad gauge at £-/-/9	1,312	10	0				2,062	10	0			
Earthworks in creek diversions, 6,200 yd^{3} (4,700 m^{3}) at £-/1/6	465	0	0				0	0	0			
Earthworks in table drains, 8.2 ch (540 ft; 160 m) narrow gauge or 7 ch (460 ft; 140 m) broad gauge at £-/2/-	82	0	0				70	0	0			
Earthworks in cutting in station grounds, including platform, 3,000 yd^{3} (2,300 m^{3}) narrow gauge or 4,800 yd^{3} (3,700 m^{3}) broad gauge at £-/1/3	187	10	0	9,859	10	0	180	0	0	13,937	10	0
Bridges and trestles, 8,844 ft (2,696 m) narrow gauge or 6,600 ft (2,000 m) broad gauge	15,210	0	0				15,700	0	0			
Walhalla station, built over creek							3,500	0	0			
Culverts	1,400	0	0	16,610	0	0	2,240	0	0	21,440	0	0
Metalling and gravelling roads and in station grounds, 300 yd^{3} (230 m^{3}) at £-/2/6				37	10	0				37	10	0
Ballast, 4 in (100 mm) under sleepers, 5,500 yd^{3} (4,200 m^{3}) narrow gauge or 8,400 yd^{3} (6,400 m^{3}) broad gauge at £-/3/-				825	0	0				1,155	0	0
Sleepers, 48 by 8 by 4 in (1,219 by 203 by 102 mm), 20,800 at £-/1/6 narrow gauge or 96 by 9 by 4.5 in (2,438 by 229 by 114 mm), 17,600 at £-/3/- broad gauge				1,560	0	0				2,640	0	0
Rails and fastenings, main line and sidings (40 lb/yd (20 kg/m), 9.25 miles (14.89 km) narrow gauge or 8 miles (13 km) broad gauge at £361	3,339	5	0				2,888	0	0			
Points and crossings	255	0	0	3,594	5	0	153	0	0	3,041	0	0
Laying permanent way, main line and sidings	543	0	0				499	0	0			
Carriage of permanent way materials	287	0	0	830	0	0	248	0	0	747	0	0
Walhalla station, passenger platform (200 ft (61 m), £100; portable offices, quarters &c., £495; goods-shed (40 ft (12 m)) and goods platform (100 ft (30 m)), £405				1,000	0	0				1,000	0	0
Engine shed, &c. (incl. Turntable for broad gauge)				400	0	0				1,150	0	0
Water supply, 1				200	0	0				200	0	0
Signals				40	0	0				40	0	0
Telegraph, 8.75 mi (14.08 km) narrow gauge or 7.6 mi (12.2 km) broad gauge at £15				131	5	0				114	0	0
Subtotal				37,270	10	0				47,499	0	0
Provision 10 per cent. Miscellaneous items and unforeseen contingencies				3,727	1	0				4,749	18	0
Engineering and surverying				3,800	0	0				4,000	0	0
Total				44,797	11	0				56,248	18	0
Cost of "old" survey Moe-Moondarra, 18 mi 38 ch (29.7 km)				75,686	0	0				92,300	0	0
Cost of transfer and maintenance equipment at Moe				3,800	0	0				0	0	0
Cost of rolling stock, assuming the line is profitable, at 27 mi (43 km) at £850				22,950	0	0				0	0	0
Total				147,233	0	0				148,548	0	0

In early 1900 a new proposal was made for a 2 ft 6 in (762 mm) gauge line with a cost estimate of £42,13 per mile, down from £6,240 per mile for a broad gauge line along a similar route; some of the savings came from lighter rails. This route would have required provision of a tunnel about four miles before arriving at Walhalla. The cost estimates did not account for land resumption, nor rolling stock, but the estimates were £14,000 for the former and two locomotives, two combined passenger-brake vans, sixty open wagons, one louvre van and one livestock van, to supply a daily mixed train with extra local goods trains on an as-required basis. The Chairman of the Railways Standing Committee submitted a report which predicted that, after accounting for interest on the capital loans for the line's construction, the narrow gauge Walhalla line would have an annual deficit of £715. In practice, the first full financial year of the railway's operation generated less than three-quarters of the projected revenue figures after accounting for inflation. (Note: The financial year ending 30 June 1912 recorded £6462/19/5 net across all revenue streams for the line, against the 1900 estimate of £7,615 inflated to £8671.)

Any railway to Walhalla was known to be dependent on the town and its associated mines, because most of the mountainous terrain was not suitable for agricultural production, and a lot of the timber in the region had already been stripped to make way for the mines. At the time, the Long Tunnel Mine on its own was consuming 18,000 long tons (18,000 t) of firewood. An outside consideration was to build a railway from Leongatha through Morwell to Walhalla, with the goal of providing a direct connection from coal mines to supplement the timber supplies. Aside from the demand for timber at the various mines in Walhalla, mentions were also made of the potential for tourism traffic.

=== The first construction bill ===
The line was recommended for construction on 19 April 1900, with a funding limit of £4,000 per mile; the Minister moved a motion to refer the Moe-Walhalla line to the Parliamentary Select Committee on 21 August, though the Member for Brighton expressed concern about the line's projected non-profitability. Authorisation came on 12 October 1900 for a total cost of £151,800, based on an average daily wage cost of labourer of £-/7/-. By this stage Walhalla had grown to 3,500 residents in 800 houses, and facilities included three churches, two banks and eight local stores, six hotels and a number of other facilities.

A prerequisite for the railway construction in the Act was that the Moe-Walhalla Railway Trust provided more than £2,000 to the State, which would be used as compensation for landowners whose fields would be acquired as part of the new alignment. The money had been deposited in 1902, but no progress was made until the Railway Officers visited the region in early February 1903. The delay, according to the newly appointed then elected Premier Irvine, was blamed on a lack of funds in the State Treasury. After Irvine was succeeded by Thomas Bent, the latter visited Moe on 21 April 1904 and assured townspeople that the railway would be built shortly. There was also speculation that a local Reverend spoke to Bent about finding employment for local residents, or that the project had been prioritised due to an upcoming election. Construction of the railway began on 18 May 1904, and in July the Railways put out tenders for 25,000 sleepers and 152 messmate bridge piles. The line reached the Tyers River by Easter 1905. To assist in construction efforts, one of the Baldwin ^{N}A Class locomotives was borrowed from the Wangaratta to Whitfield railway and based at Moe from February 1905; it was still present in May 1905. (Note: After leaving Moe, engine 1A was at Newport Workshops from 27 December 1905 to 27 January 1906, then proceeded to the Gembrook railway line.) According to Bent, the funding available (£30000) had been entirely spent and no more would be forthcoming until at least June 1905.

=== Tyers River to Thomson ===
In July 1906 Bent authorised 30 men and the use of old rails to continue construction, to a maximum limit of £10,000, which was thought to be enough for earthworks to Moondarra and rails to be laid nearly as far. By the end of 1907 £45,000 had been spent; Bent reported that a further £57,000 was required to complete the line, and both the Engineer in Chief and the Chief Commissioner of Railways had recommended truncating the line with a terminus for only £3,000 instead of continuing further. Local Member Harris replied that such a terminus would be of no value to the community. To resolve the funding limitations additional taxes were authorised at the end of 1907, for £-/10/- per acre on Crown and other lands, plus £442 per year over the next 20 years from private property.

The first official train to use the line ran on 26 March 1908, (Note: Fiddian (1982) says 25 March 1908.) running from Moe to Upper Moondarra (later Erica), from which the passengers (including Premier Bent and the Minister for Mines) had to continue to Walhalla town by road, as guests of the Long Tunnel company. The consist included returned locomotive 1A hauling one wagon (20^{N}QR) and one carriage (an ^{N}B^{B} with end platforms). The line from Moe to Moondarra (from context, likely Harris/Erica) was "practically completed" by November 1907, with construction branch trains conveying goods and passengers in that section from 18 August 1908. Work from there to Walhalla had begun on 7 April 1908, with trains available for public use as far as Thomson from 13 September 1909.

From June 1908 trains carried passengers and goods from Moe to a temporary terminus just short of the Thompson River, where a short run-around loop was provided. Trains ran once per week, the rest of the time reserved for construction. However, the first train from Thomson arrived late at Moe and missed the connection to the Melbourne train, because the engine had been fitted with an experimental speed recorder which needed to be tested.

=== Reaching Walhalla ===
The third Bill for the line was the Mpe-Walhalla Railway Completion Bill, which was put to Parliament in October 1908. This required the Moe-Walhalla Railway Construction Trust to provide a further £1,500 in two installments by 1 June 1909, though with a caveat that properties valued at £15 or less would not be charged further rates. By the end of March 1909 the trestle bridge across Jacobs Creek was complete with rails expected shortly thereafter, and ballasting had progressed to Murie station by 4 June. Two more bridges were under construction beyond there, and in the meantime goods were accepted at "Murie's Corner". But as winter approached the weather made it harder to progress construction, and flooding in June washed away one of the tramway bridges across the Thomson River.

A second weekly service was provided shortly thereafter, and in September two new composite first and second class passenger carriages (3 and 4 ^{N}AB^{AB}) and one guards van (^{N}D^{D}) were despatched from Newport Workshops. By mid October the line was complete as far as "the long bridge through the gorge at Gilbert's second water wheel."

During construction of some of the deeper cuttings a temporary 4 ft (1,219 mm) line was built for end-tipping trucks to remove and dump excavated materials. After construction the occasional landslip damaged the newly laid 2 ft 6 in (762 mm) track and had to be cleared; this would be achieved by adding a third rail to create a 2 ft (610 mm) path for smaller skips.

The site of Walhalla station was excavated from the mountainside, with the railway yard area cut out of the mountainside. After the station opened, the rerouted Stringers Gorge was roofed over from south of the water-wheel to make room for the new station building.

Rails reached Walhalla on 14 February 1910 and the first construction train was worked into the yard by engine 1A. A month later, on 15 March 1910, the first Mixed train from Moe arrived, hauled by newly built engine 9A. The first train into Walhalla arrived on 15 March 1910 (as Fiddian (1982) points out, the Ides of March), being greeted by over 200 residents.

The line was officially opened on 3 May 1910 with a special train from Melbourne at 7:28 am carrying dignitaries, connecting at Moe to the narrow gauge train. The narrow gauge trip left Moe at 10:25 am, arriving Walhalla at 1 pm, with the regular 11:50 am train from Moe not permitted to depart until advice had been received that the Special had passed Harris (later Erica) station; nor could the regular train continue from there until the Special had confirmed its arrival at Walhalla. The special narrow gauge train was worked from Moe by engine 9A, while the regular train from Walhalla to Moe and return used 1A. Speeches at the event included reference to tourism, "if the mines failed". The Railway Construction Branch finished their work in January 1912, and the line was officially handed over to the Victorian Railways on 15 October 1913. The Special trip was scheduled to leave Walhalla at 3:30 pm, arriving at Moe 6:10 pm and the connecting train was scheduled to arrive back at Melbourne at 9:12 pm.

When the line opened it served Gooding, Tyers River, Gould, Pearson, Watson, Harris (formerly Upper Moondarra), Murie, Thompson and Walhalla, with a total cost of £104,115; this was £11,754 below the estimate, although the cost of construction through Stringers Gorge ended up being as high as £6,260 per 1 mile (1.6 kilometres). Between 6 June 1908 and 3 May 1910, the sum traffic amounted to over 3,000 long tons (3,000 t; 3,400 short tons) of goods earning £930 in revenue, plus £802/16/6 in passenger ticket sales. At time of opening Walhalla's station building had not yet been constructed, and many of the intermediate sidings and loops would not open for over a year.

The construction project had used 58,000 locally cut sleepers, and 400,000 cubic yards (310,000 m^{3}) of rock had been excavated, primarily with pick and shovel.

Even as the line's construction approached Walhalla the gold mines had started to shut down, and the last one in the region closed at the end of 1915. A common epithet was that the line had been built to help remove the town. As the mines closed the population moved on to mining coal in Wonthaggi, Victoria or gold in Kalgoorlie, Western Australia; by 1920 after the Great War, the population of Walhalla had dwindled to only 250 people. In practice the vast majority of the traffic on the line was timber, mostly from local sawmills with occasional log traffic.

== Route ==
=== General description ===
The 1927 grades chart indicates the line was fully fenced in the dropper style, and provided with combined railway and postal wires along the west side of the line to Gould, though Trainor notes these wires ran the whole length of the line, typically no more than 10 ft (3.0 m) above ground level. Maintenance of the line was divided among four crews; one each at Moe, Gould and Erica, each with three staff members, a tricycle and two hand-operated trolleys, and the Walhalla gang with three staff members, two tricycles, one hand-operated trolley, and two motorised trolleys. Each of the four gangs was responsible for about 7 mi (11.27 km) of track including sidings. Ganger tool sheds were present at each of the four depots; two departmental residences at Gould and four at Erica. For train operations there were cattle loading facilities at Moondarra and Erica, and water supplies gravity-fed at Walhalla but pumped by oil to Gould and Erica (the latter with two water columns). Walhalla was also listed as having a coal stage, engine shed, and a 6 t (6.6 short tons) crane. Walhalla's coal stage was 20 by 15 square feet (1.9 by 1.4 m^{2}), and was rated to hold 20 long tons (20 t; 22 short tons) of coal at 3 feet (0.91 m) depth, 27 long tons (27 t; 30 short tons) of coal at 4 feet (1.2 m) depth, or 33 long tons (34 t; 37 short tons) of coal at 5 feet (1.5 m) depth; noting that this coal would have been railed in from Moe (including manual transhipment there) in ^{N}QR wagons each rated for 11 long tons (11 t; 12 short tons).

The line was laid using recycled rails, with a mix of 60 lb/yd (30 kg/m), 66 lb/yd (33 kg/m) and 75 lb/yd (37 kg/m) steel and/or iron rails. Sleepers were hardwood, with a mix of 5 feet 6 inches by 10 inches by 5 inches (1.68 m × 0.25 m × 0.13 m) and 5 feet 6.0 inches by 9.0 inches by 4.5 inches (1.676 m × 0.229 m × 0.114 m) sizes, at 9 or 10 sleepers per 22 ft 6 in (6.86 m) length of rail. Ballast was gravel, to a depth of 4 in (0.10 m).

The maximum track speed on the date of the official opening was 18 mph (29 km/h), increased in Weekly Notice No.22/10 to 20 mph (32 km/h) from Moe to Tyers River, then 15 mph (24 km/h) to about half a mile beyond Knott's Siding (later Fullwood Siding), and finally 10 mph (16 km/h) from there to Walhalla. Speed limit signs were provided on both sides of the track, in both directions, at each of these transitions. Furthermore, trains had to stop twice on the Up trip and once on the Down trip, at 89 mi (143 km), 94.75 mi (152.49 km) and 100.25 mi (161.34 km), to apply the handbrakes on every single vehicle to prevent a runaway on the following downhill slope. The train would then have to stop again at the end of the downhill section to release those brakes.

=== Moe Station ===
The narrow gauge facilities at Moe started immediately west of what is now the westernmost Narracan Drive bridge over the railway, previously part of the Princes Highway. The eastern limit of narrow gauge track was in the engine shed, at 80 mi 28.29 chains (129.317 km) from Melbourne. The present-day Moe Skate Park carpark area, adjacent to the bridge. was formerly the locomotive depot shared by broad and narrow gauge locomotives with two shed roads (one of each gauge) provided in 1909 and a coal stage, then a run-around loop for narrow-gauge trains and a stub siding with a ramp for inter-gauge transfers. Then, facing west, a siding diverted to the left to serve the rear of the broad gauge goods shed, and continuing beyond to a livestock race with narrow gauge on the north and broad gauge on the south. Moe had previously had a turntable stub track behind the station platform and branching from the Thorpdale line, though sources differ as to whether that had a 50 ft (15.2 m) or 53 ft (16.2 m) bridge. Either way, the dual gauge turntable provided on 30 June 1910 was definitely of the longer type. The dual-gauge coal stage had an area of 77 by 13 square feet (7.2 by 1.2 m^{2}), and was rated to hold 67 long tons (68 t; 75 short tons) of coal at 3 feet (0.91 m) depth, 89 long tons (90 t; 100 short tons) of coal at 4 feet (1.2 m) depth, or 111 long tons (113 t; 124 short tons) of coal at 5 feet (1.5 m) depth.

The yard at Moe grew over time; the Victorian Railways' Line Diagram for the narrow gauge portion of Moe yard shows revisions in 1922, 1923, 1924, 1933, 1942, 1945 and 1949. By the time interlocking was provided in 1913, broad gauge tracks 2 and 3 were extended at the east end to serve the coal stage and locomotive depot, and via a back-shunt, the narrow gauge transfer ramp respectively. A passenger shelter for narrow gauge passengers was provided in 1915.

In 1924 the Up home Signal from Walhalla, worked by lever 3 in the original Moe signal box, was moved 100 yd (91 m) yards further out, and by 1927 an additional stub siding from the turntable, an elevated inspection track and another stub siding from the goods shed road had been provided. On 15 September 1927 changes to the broad gauge signalling at Moe required that the Up Walhalla home signal be swapped from signal box lever 3 to lever 5.

In early 1930 the turntable was upgraded to 70 ft (21.3 m). The new turntable, like the old, was fitted with four rails in a gauntlet track arrangement. By 1931 the yard had been further expanded, with a second loop siding track on the north side of the trestle connecting to the new stub track from the turntable with an intermediate crossover passing behind the inspection trestle; these changes would have been a precursor to the service on the line changing from starting and ending at Walhalla, to starting and ending at Moe. In 1932 a new siding branched from the goods shed and stock race siding, curving parallel to the Walhalla line over George Street to serve Christensen's butter factory and Saxton's sawmill, both situated between the modern-day George Street and Albert Street. In 1935 the loco depot gained a third siding, this one south of the shed with four rails again in a gauntlet form. In April 1946 the narrow gauge yard was extended further west, parallel to a new broad gauge siding as far as a point opposite the modern-day Lloyd Street and Kingsford Street intersection, at 79 mi 63.22 chains (128.410 km) from Melbourne. These sidings were provided with a 10 t (11 short tons) capacity gantry crane, to ease transfer of timber traffic from the Walhalla line to broad gauge wagons.

In August 1953 the Home signal from the narrow gauge line was disconnected from the Moe station interlocking and instead worked by a lever provided on the goods shed platform, to free up that lever for the then-under-construction Yallourn broad gauge branch line. After the Walhalla line closed the signal remained in place, not being abolished until September 1956

=== Moe to Tyers River ===
The Walhalla line diverged from Moe station yard between the locomotive facilities and the goods shed, with a tight curve from westbound to a north-north-east bearing. It crossed what is now George Street (with a level crossing and cattle guards provided in 1915) then ran between what are now Market and Clifton Streets. The track continued east of the present-day Saxton Drive and west of Austin Avenue to exit the town, then with bridges over the LaTrobe and Tanjil Rivers. The first of these was crossed with a long timber bridge, and the latter with a 45 ft (13.7 m) steel girder span over the river and 28 timber trestle spans to clear the floodplains. After this bridge the line entered a short cutting, which was spanned by Walhalla Road on a bridge, before continuing to the nameboard of Gooding (83 mi 48.44 chains (134.550 km) from Melbourne), where it crossed the road again. This segment of line was relatively flat, except for a short 1:30 grade uphill towards Walhalla between the two River bridges. Gooding station was only notable for being the lowest elevation of all stations and halts along the line. Fiddian (1982) claims Gooding had a raised platform, though this is not corroborated elsewhere.

After Gooding the line started about three miles of gradual incline, followed by a much steeper section of 1-in-30 up and downhill for five miles towards Gould. Neither Speed Limit 20 Plus or the 1927 grades chart for the line flag any specific points of interest between Gooding and the next passenger halt signboard of Tyers River, only noting five intermediate bridges. The last of these was over the Tyers River and featured a 45 ft (13.7 m) steel girder span span plus seven timber trestle spans. The line then arrived at the second signboard-only station, the short-lived Tyers River, at 90 mi 19 chains (145.2 km). This station closed in 1916. Russell notes that the Tyers River passenger halt was a mere 0.5 miles (885 m) from the next station, Gould, explaining why it closed so early.

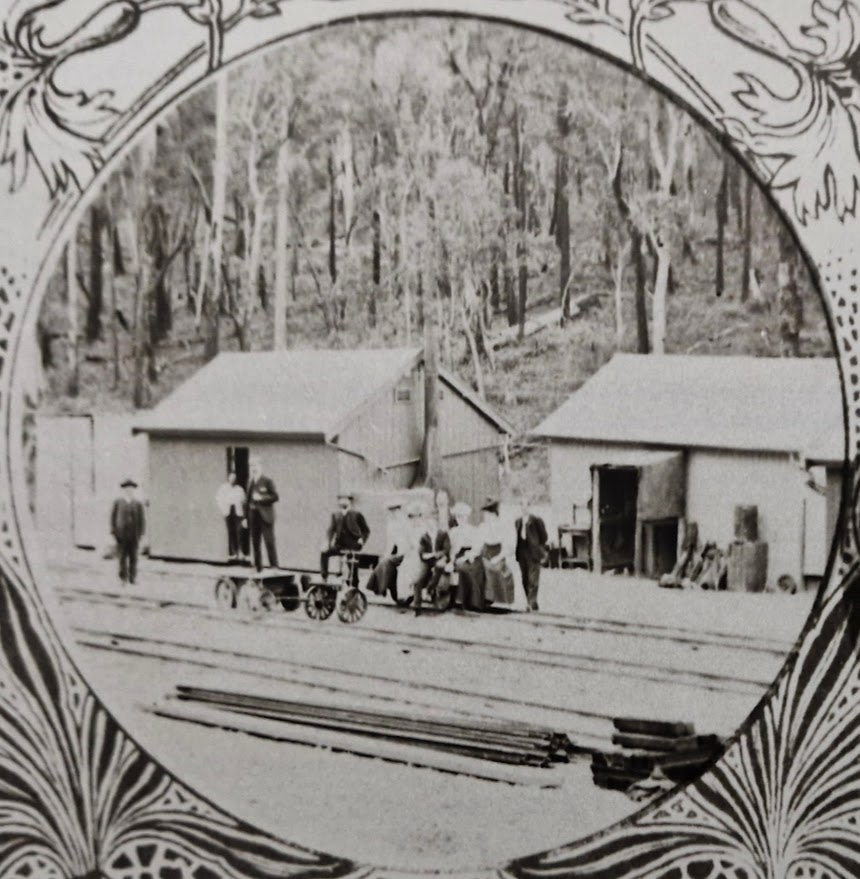
Temporary Station at 8 miles 65 chains on Walhalla line c.1905 (Wilf Henty)

However, the section between Gooding and Tyers River featured two intermediate sites. These were an unnamed temporary station site at 8 mi 65 chains (14.2 km) from Moe, or approximately 88 mi 77 chains (143.2 km) from Melbourne, placing it about a mile from the crest of the 1 in 30 uphill slope; and a stub siding branching from the line at 9 mi 50 chains (15.5 km) from Moe (89 mi 62 chains (144.5 km)), terminating at a stub 9 mi 62 chains (15.7 km). Both sites were used while the railway was under construction from around Easter 1905; construction branch trains worked by engine 1A would have had to run from Moe to the temporary station site, run around their trains, and push wagons the remaining mile or so to the stub siding; and this may explain references to a siding at the lower chainage or a station at the higher chainage. This was the end of the line during construction of the Tyers River bridge and the 18 month period where no funds were available to continue the line further north. During its use the Temporary Station was provided with three portable 20 ft (6.1 m) buildings, as well as a bark-roofed hut, a number of tents and a few other temporary structures. The station was in use until at least April 1906, and featured the mainline plus two loop tracks on the south-east side; it was also considered for retention as a siding dedicated to the Australian Paper Manufacturer company, but that did not eventuate. The siding likely closed around 1913 or 1914, with the rails recycled as part of the expanded yard at Gould, the next station along the line. It is at least plausible that the temporary station could have been provided at the listed chainage, as the construction plans for the route show a straight section of track between 8 mi 62.4 chains (14.13 km) and 8 mi 73.72 chains (14.358 km) from Moe with a level crossing that does not appear on the 1927 grades chart.

=== Gould, Moondarra and Watson ===
Gould was opened with the line as a stopping place, probably only with a nameboard. The town had been a prominent rest point for trips to and from Walhalla, and in 1905 William Gould built his hotel, the Cecil Inn, nearby. That had been around the time the railway construction paused at Tyers River; and the hotel was famed for "generous portions of sirloin". On 1 August 1910 the station was opened for light goods in addition to passengers, but at the time it did not have any sidings. On 8 June 1914 (Note: Speed Limit 20 Plus says February 1916.) an Annett Lock (perhaps two) was provided with the key being attached to the train staff for the Moe - Harris (later Erica) section, indicating provision of a loop siding on the east side of the line for timber traffic delivered from a local tramway. The loop was 506 ft (154 m) or 18 trucks long, plus a very short stub siding at the up end, (Note: This stub siding was likely too short to hold any rolling stock, so it may have simply been a turnout acting as a catch point.) and the station was upgraded to include a passenger shelter, a goods shelter and staff accommodation. Russell notes that the rails for the loop were recycled from the stub siding used during the line's construction, and refers to an article in Light Railways No.102 (October 1988) by McCarthy. The loop siding was converted to staff locks (worked by a key milled as the end of the Train Staff) on 27 September 1920. Between the weeks ending Tuesdays (Note: Victorian Railways' weekly notices were published on Tuesdays.) 15 February 1921 and 21 April 1931, Gould was permitted to open as an intermediate special block post. Trainor noted that, at least in 1927, there had been a small tea stall provided at the station, opened when trains passed through and operated by the owner of a mixed business "on the road near the local hotel".

Gould was noted in the 1919 General Appendix as having less than normal clearance between the mainline and loop siding, so no person was allowed in the space between the tracks whilst shunting was underway.

By 18 March 1954 the dual water tanks and "mallee shed" were still present but the tea stall had long since been removed. A house was present at the far Down end of the station, thought to be the Departmental Residence (DR) (Note: Departmental Residences were houses owned by the Victorian Railways and allocated to railway employees. As of the early 1960s, these were provided without floor coverings but with blinds for all windows. Station Masters were allocated an annual supply of 6 LT (6.1 t) of firewood, plus either 150 kWh of electricity or 32 imp gal (150 L) of kerosene. The houses were referred to as rent-free, but an annual charge was deducted from the staff members' yearly salary and the rent valuation was included in tax returns.) of the station caretaker, formerly occupied by Gould's station master. The up end of the yard had a large "SPEED LIMIT 20 MILES PER HOUR" sign for Up trains, notably on the left side of the track which on the narrow gauge was the fireman's side; and the photograph shows that the up end of the loop track was effectively a catch point, not a siding extension. Watson station was the site of another Mallee Shed. No evidence of the former Brown's tramway was visible alongside the loop siding, contrasting against a photo in "Rails to Old Walhalla" dated circa 1924.

The station closed with the line on 25 June 1954, and the staff locks were removed with the siding by 7 June 1955. The whole of the town of Gould was sold in 1960 and residents forced to move out, as works began on the Moondarra Dam project. Some parts of the town and old station site were still visible in 2011.

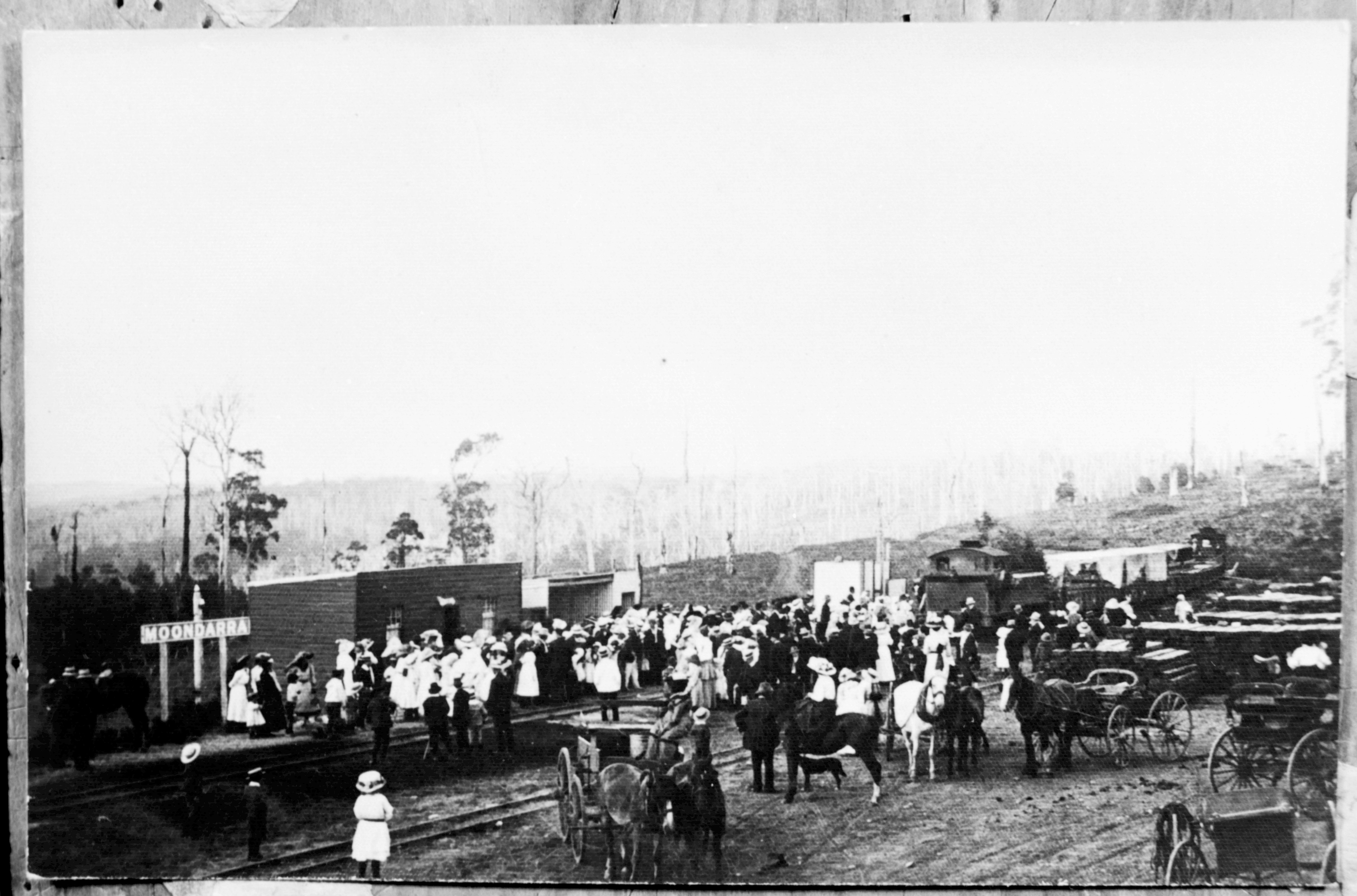
Moondarra station opening 1910

Moondarra station had opened as Pearson with the line but was renamed by 12 September the same year. The original name was for William Pearson Senior and Junior, who were prominent local politicians and horse racing enthusiasts; the replacement name was drawn from the local indigenous language word "Mundara" and translated to "plenty of rain or thunder". This station had a passenger shelter, a loop siding 474 ft (144 m) or 17 trucks long and was provided with a cattle race. (Note: Watson (1980) describes this as sheep hurdles, rather than a full cattle installation.) By 12 December 1910 the station was provided with Annett locks for its siding, with the key attached to the train staff for the section. These were converted to Staff Locks on 27 September 1920. Traffic from the station was generally livestock and potatoes, with timber from the tramway as a tertiary consideration. In early 1937 the station was redefined with the loop siding and mainline track swapped, to allow trucks to be stabled on the Mount Erica side of the track for loading. These would be left in the siding as required, then loaded via a timber tramway running west from the station with a steep (1 in 6) decline from the station site to the Tyers River. At the foot of the hill there had been a sawmill, itself fed by a horse-powered tramway approximately 5 mi (8 km) long that extracted logs from the southern region of the Baw Baw Range. When the tramway closed in early 1946 the mainline and loop reverted to their original definitions, with the staff locks and associated equipment restored to prior configuration. (Note: The Moondarra station line diagram shows derail blocks on both the loop and mainline tracks at the Up end, but the date of the document revision is not legible.)

The cleared site of Moondarra station is now used as a council depot, but parts of the rail alignment have been converted to road or walking tracks.

After Moondarra there was a downhill slope of 1 in 41 crossing over another bridge, then a level section to the next station, a shelter called Watson adjacent to another level crossing with Upper Moondarra Road (now Moe-Rawson Road). The station, named for local settler Samuel Watson, was initially only for passengers, but light goods could be waybilled to and from the site from 27 March 1911. The station was described as having a "landing" rather than a platform. The road crossed to the west side of the line here, following the edge of the mountain for about half a mile while the railway took a slightly longer approach to manage the local gradient before the two came together on the approach to Collins' Siding.

=== Collins' Siding and Erica ===
==== Collins' Siding ====
Collins' Siding was slightly beyond where Upper Moondarra Road (now Moe-Rawson Road) met the alignment of the railway. At this point the railway took over the road's original alignment while the road was pushed west into the cliffside for a length of a little under a mile, as both ascended. The siding opened on 3 June 1918 to collect timber from Mr. H Collins' sawmill on Hotel Creek, with a connecting wooden-railed tramway between the two that featured gradients as steep as 1 in 7 and required five horses to shift logs weighing 3.5 long tons (3.6 t; 3.9 short tons). The siding was originally worked by Annett Locks with the key attached to the Train Staff, though this was converted to Staff Locks with the rest of the line on 27 September 1920.

In early 1926 the siding was transferred to C. Ingram, though it kept its original name, and the alignment of the timber tramway was partially recycled for the steel-railed Tyers Valley Tramway which opened in September 1927. This tramway had been built to replace the extensive network which had been destroyed in the bushfires of February 1926, and used similar construction quality to those of the Walhalla line, though curve radii were significantly tighter and more sleepers were used to reduce the necessary quantity of ballast.

The new tramway was connected to the Victorian Railways network by a crossover at the down end, but it had its own yard parallel to the Walhalla line's siding built 15 to 18 in (381 to 457 mm) above the rail height of the Walhalla line. The loading of the tramway had previously been run to Erica and transhipped to the Victorian Railways' network there, and the opening of the tramway directly led to a reduction in staff at that station as its administrative requirements dropped. In 1928 the loop was extended by 610 ft (186 m) in a "forward" direction, though it is not clear whether that was towards Moe or towards Walhalla. At this time an additional intermediate crossover was provided between the mainline and loop track (facing points for down Walhalla trains), and the stub siding at the north end of the railway siding was extended a further 330 ft (101 m) parallel to the tramway then connected across to that system. The siding was closed with the line on 25 June 1954, and all equipment removed by 7 June 1955.

The Tramway delivered loads of up to 73 LT (74 t) of sawn timber, twice per day, to Collins' Siding with their Climax locomotive

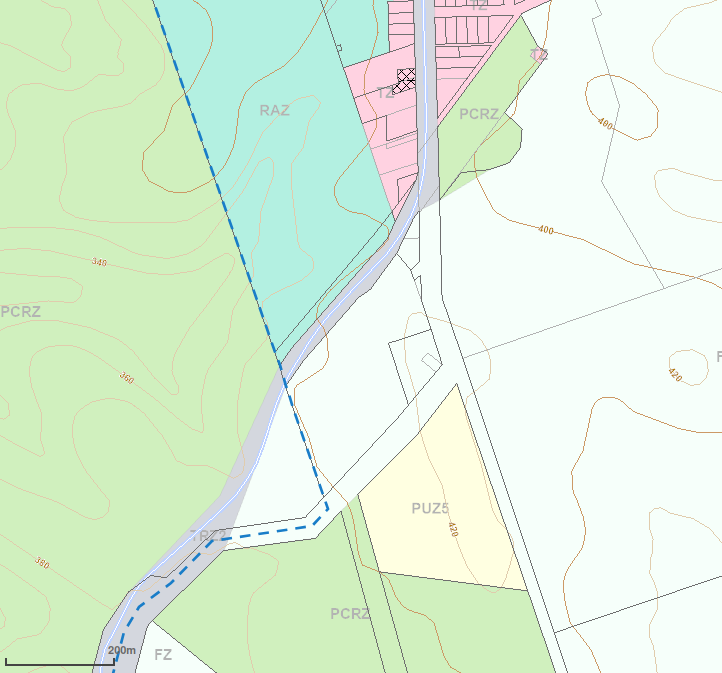
Property boundaries south of Erica, Victoria, as at January 2026 (Department of Transport and Planning via VicPlan)

After Collins' Siding the roadway briefly crossed back to the east side of the railway via another level crossing, then joined to what is now Mathiesons Road at the northern corner of Moondarra Cemetery. This linking road no longer exists and the main road (in grey and marked TUZ2 on the map at right) has been diverted to the former railway alignment, but the property boundaries south of Erica town show the former roadway running along the north side of Moondarra Cemetery (pale yellow, marked PUZ5).

==== Erica ====
The next station, Erica, opened while the line was under construction first as Upper Moondarra, though by 15 June 1908 it became simply Moondarra. Entering the station from the south required passing under a road bridge, then the station featured a three-track arrangement with passenger facilities. It also originally included a locomotive shed siding, branching east from the mainline at the down end of the yard; by the time the line opened a fourth siding was provided with a connection only at the down end. When the line opened officially the station was renamed Harris after the local Member of Parliament for Walhalla., who had been instrumental in having the line constructed. Local residents objected to the renaming on the grounds that it would affect produce sales, but as Pearson station had since claimed the name Moondarra, Harris had to be renamed to somethng else. On 1 September 1914 it was renamed Erica after the nearby mountain. It is not clear how long the locomotive shed remained in place, though when the line opened all trains ran the full length from Walhalla to Moe and return, so it was likely only used during construction. On opening the mainline featured a passenger station building, a cattle race, a track maintenance shed, and a water tank at each end, while the opposite side of the yard was home to the goods shed.

By 12 December 1910 the points at each end of the station were converted to Annett Locks, with the key being attached to the Moe-Walhalla train staff. In February 1912 increasing traffic on the line necessitated capacity for more than one train at any given time, so the section Moe - Walhalla was split into Moe - Harris and Harris - Walhalla, the former section being converted to a No.1 Pattern Lock Staff. Arriving Home signals were provided at Harris in March 1913 to protect trains shunting within yard limits, and the signals were interlocked such that they could only be put to Proceed if the track was set for the mainline on the arriving side. Additional sidings were provided in March 1914, (Note: Medlin and Russell suggest that the siding had been in place since construction in 1908.) and the station was upgraded from 'No-one in charge" status, with train crews handling paperwork, to a dedicated Caretaker. The station was renamed to Erica in September that year.

In November 1912 the station was noted for hosting a refreshment room where passengers could have a cup of tea and a sandwich.

A sketch of a plan dated 14 November 1913 shows a proposal to build, or perhaps restore, the engine shed siding at the down end of the station.

On 21 June 1916 the station was disestablished as a Train Staff and Ticket station, with the line reverting to Moe-Walhalla as a single section, using a No.3 Pattern Lock Staff. The turnouts each end from the mainline reverted to Annett locks in lieu of plunger locks, though the station was still capable of "switching in" as an Intermediate Special Block Post if needed; this would permit a second train to follow a first one after that had passed Erica in either direction, but it would not permit trains in opposing directions. The station Caretaker was withdrawn in December the same year.

Watson (1980) refers to a Forests Siding near or at Erica that was staff-locked on 19 March 1917, though this is unlikely as the rest of the station and line was Annett-locked at the time. It is more likely that some change was made to the derail arrangements.

Traffic picked up again in 1920, with the Train Staff and Ticket arrangements reinstated on 17 May 1920; a Stationmaster was provided less than a month later. As with the rest of the line the Annett-locked points were converted to Staff Locks in September 1920, though the train staff sections remained Moe - Erica (Note: (No.1 Pattern Lock Staff)) and Erica - Walhalla. As a further reflection of increased traffic the section Moe - Erica was subdivided from 15 February 1921, with Gould made able to open as an Intermediate Special Block Post allowing trains to follow closer together at that end of the line. The stationmaster remained in place for a few years, but in 1927 the line's Travelling Station Master position was withdrawn from Walhalla and transposed to the Erica Station Master. In April 1931 that, too was withdrawn, and Erica was handed back to a Caretaker; this was probably a direct result of the Tyers Valley tramway connecting at Collins' Siding, as timber traffic shifted to loading there instead of at Erica.

The 1927 diagram for Erica clearly shows only three tracks, so the engine shed siding and the construction siding had definitely been removed by this point.

The station yard was substantially increased in size in 1941 when the Forests Commission of Victoria had a spur line provided for a new sawmill. This facility had previously been stationed at Nayook railway station on the Noojee railway line. This track split from the yard at the Up end of No.3 Road, with a dedicated loop and stub siding adjacent to Erica's main yard then a gate to the Forest Commission's land; the siding had a total length of about half a mile, including a short loop siding to bypass the sawmill structure. Victorian Railways' locomotives were not permitted to shunt in the Mill sidings, with a separate dedicated locomotive provided by that industry in lieu. At this time the middle road of Erica's main yard only had a derail facility at the Down end; No.3 road with the goods shed was 425 ft (130 m) or 15 trucks clear. Assuming typical spacing between parallel tracks and therefore normal limits for truck placement at the ends of sidings (with about 60 ft (18 m) from the toe of turnout to the "fouling point" where applicable), the Forest Mill's stub siding would have been about 422 ft (129 m) or 15 trucks clear, and their loop siding about 483 ft (147 m) or 17 trucks clear, while the sawmill loading area would have been about 165 ft (50 m) or 6 trucks clear. From the sawmill another tramway ran due north from Erica for about 25 miles (40 km). The tramway was built to a gauge of 3 ft (914 mm), and was built between 1938 and 1941, operating until 1950. This tramway supplied timber to the Erica sawmill, which provided sawn timber for residential construction and bridge timbers to the Country Roads Board and local councils, nearly all of which was railed to a seasoning plant at Newport, Victoria. The mill was destroyed in fire in September 1953, but by the time it was rebuilt in June 1954 the railway was on its last days.

The Tyers Valley tramway from Collins' Siding last operated in early August 1949, and in November 1950 their Climax locomotive was steamed from Tyers Junction to the siding, then driven to the sawmill sidings of Erica yard on 14 December 1950.

On 14 October 1952 the railway beyond Erica to Platina was closed (Platina to Walhalla having been closed almost a decade earlier), followed by the whole line on 25 June 1954. All remaining facilities were removed by June 1955. Even after the line closed, the sawmill sidings around Erica remained in use and were being shunted as late as 1963 by a diesel locomotive, while the Tyers Valley tramway's Climax locomotive sat derelict nearby.

The former road bridge over the railway at the up end appears to have been filled in underneath to make room for road realignments, but it would likely have been around the present-day intersection between Mathiesons Road, Moe-Walhalla Road and School Road. The site of Erica station is now zoned as parkland, and occupied by an athletics field and a caravan park. The Walhalla Goldfields Railway intends to eventually extend their line from along the rail trail from Thomson back to Erica, and establish the site as their primary workshop.

=== Erica to Platina ===
After departing Erica the line towards Walhalla was peppered with assorted sidings, gradually transitioning from logging to mining as the primary industry. From the station there was a roughly 1.5 mi (2 km) stretch where the railway dipped down to a bridge over Jacobs Creek (with a 10-span curved trestle bridge on a curve of 5 chains (101 m) radius), then climbed back up to almost the same height by the 100-mile post.

==== Fullwood's Siding ====
The first siding would eventually be named Fullwood's Siding, but it had a number of steps to proceed through before reaching that stage. Initially it had opened as the Wood Siding for Long Tunnel Mine on 12 December 1910, then renamed the Long Tunnel Mining Company's Siding in 1911. In this form it was available only for outwards goods loads, and as of Weekly Notice No.50/10, it was not to be worked by Mixed trains. According to the 1913 General Appendix, the mining company was responsible for organising the trucks within the siding to minimise shunting time necessary for a passing goods train to deposit empty trucks and collect loaded trucks with a minimum quantity of six loaded trucks per shunt, positioned before the train's arrival to minimise shunting time. Timber collected from here was used in mining activities, either as fuel or to shore up tunnels.

Following cessation of mining activities the siding was transferred to a Mr G. W. Knott as of 1 September 1913, and renamed Knott's Siding about four months later. (Note: Russell notes that there was also a Knott's Siding on the Beech Forest narrow gauge line, renamed Ferguson during construction, and therefore the Walhalla line siding was referred to as "G. W. Knott's Siding" to avoid confusion. Adding to the confusion, a second siding on the Beech Forest line, Kincaid, was acquired by a G. W. Knott in 1924.) From 20 April 1914 the site of the siding was made available for passenger traffic and operated under "No one in charge" conditions so passengers had to flag down trains and purchase tickets from the Guard or Travelling Station Master. By the week ending 20 July 1914 Murie was closed, with instructions issued then to delete its administrative entries and replace them with Knott's Siding.

The same minimum load of six trucks continued to apply as at 1919, and additionally could only be worked during daylight hours.

In September 1920 the siding points were converted from an Annett Lock to a Staff Lock. Shortly thereafter, the siding was sold again to Mr E. Fullwood, and the former Knott's Siding then acted largely as a headshunt for the trailing Fullwood siding. This was formalised in May 1922 when vehicles were no longer permitted to stable in Knott's Siding. Fullwood's Siding remained in use until August 1941, and both sidings were then dismantled.

Knott's Siding was 201 ft (61 m) or 7 trucks long; when it was converted to a headshunt the Fullwood siding was only 120 ft (37 m) or 4 trucks long.

==== O'Shea's Siding ====
After Fullwood's Siding was a deep cutting, then a loop siding was provided on the north side of the line, initially with about 140 ft (43 m) or 5 trucks of space available. This had been provided in April 1921 as Ezard's Siding, and the loop was extended by 60 ft (18 m) (2 trucks) in 1924. In 1925 a stub siding was extended from the down end of the loop, initially as the Lime Company Siding but quickly renamed as the White Rock Lime Company Pty Ltd Siding. This only had capacity of 62 ft (19 m) or 2 trucks. The loop siding was flanked on the north side by a timber tramway network that extended through Rawson and Amor as far as modern day Baw Baw National Park and Caringal, and on the south side by a separate tramway serving a mine near Coopers Creek. The White Rock Lime siding was abolished in May 1939, shortly after provision of a replacement siding at Platina. Ezard's Siding remained as a loop until closure and abolition in June 1941.

The cutting between Knott's Siding and O'Shea's Siding was used as a local rubbish tip in the 1970s, and has been partially filled in.

==== Murie ====
Murie station opened with the line to serve the Long Tunnel Company's mining activities. It had a short, dead-end siding accessed from the Up end of the station. The mining company didn't last very long after that, and so the station was closed to passenger traffic on 1 July 1912. It did, however, remain open for timber traffic, lasting in this way until final closure on 20 April 1914, and this is probably when the siding was removed.

As of Weekly Notice No.27/10, Murie's Siding had to be worked by dedicated local goods trains from Walhalla, and not the regular Mixed train.

Russell hypothesised that the name was derived from a family-owned sawmill in the area, circa 1880s. More recent research by Victoria's Forestry Heritage indicates a consistent presence of sawmills operated by Murie from 1889 to 1915 across five different sites, though only the mill in operation 1908 to 1912 was adjacent to Murie station. Before 1908 there had been two mills on a tramway that connected to the then-future site of Knott's siding and one mill near the point where the railway would eventually cross Coopers Creek; and after 1912 the operation moved to the north side of the railway and connected via a tramway to Erica station. This latter mill was sold to O'Shea & Bennett in 1915 and continued operation until 1919.

Between Murie and Platina there was a famous double horse-shoe bend, as the railway tried to extend length and smooth out gradients. The terrain and alignment here was such that, with a bit of imagination, people claimed that the driver and guard of a train could either shake hands or spit at each other (though of course the track was never closer to itself than 4 chains (80 m)). The curve had colloquially been named "Mad Murphy's.

==== Platina ====
The next location on the line started as Copper Mine Siding in July 1910, being made available to passengers on 19 December the same year. The site was about 10 ch (200 m) south of the Murie sawmill that had been in operation from 1904 to 1908. 19 January 1911 saw an additional siding provided for Evans Brothers, and this siding was also made available to the Gippsland Copper and Platinum Company. The Copper Mine Siding was renamed Platina on 9 February 1911, and made open to general goods traffic from 26 August 1912. The new name was derived from the metal platinum being mined nearby. The sidings in the area were converted from Annett to Staff Locks with the rest of the line on 27 September 1920. A third siding was opened in April 1939, for the White Rock Lime Company Pty Ltd. This siding faced down trains with the turnout at the up end of the passenger shelter, and remained in use until August 1948. (Note: Russell's diagram for Platina has the names of the sidings reversed relative to the Victorian Railways' diagram.) A tramway extended from the Evans Siding south-east parallel to Coopers Creek Road, towards the point where Coopers Creek met the Thompson River, a distance of about 1.2 kilometres.

Anchen (2012) reproduces a photo of Platina looking in the Down direction, showing a Wye point in the mainline with the left branch continuing a curve into a cutting, and the right branch immediately linking to a left-hand curve then the straight leg of a trailing left-hand turnout, and another curve to the right for the Coopers Tramway connection; the trailing side of the Evan's Bros. siding would have been to the right of the photographer, curving parallel to the mainline.

The sidings at Platina were not allowed to be worked by Mixed trains; instead trucks had to be placed at Harris (later Erica), and worked to and from Platina by a separate dedicated goods train, or a special transfer move by an engine from Walhalla. This may have been due to complexities of shunting on a steep gradient, which would have required excessive time allowances and created the risk of parking a loaded passenger train on the steep hill. However, the reference to special trains to and from Harris/Erica may indicate a second locomotive being based there, which would fit with the locomotive shed that had originally been provided there and removed by 1927, as noted above.

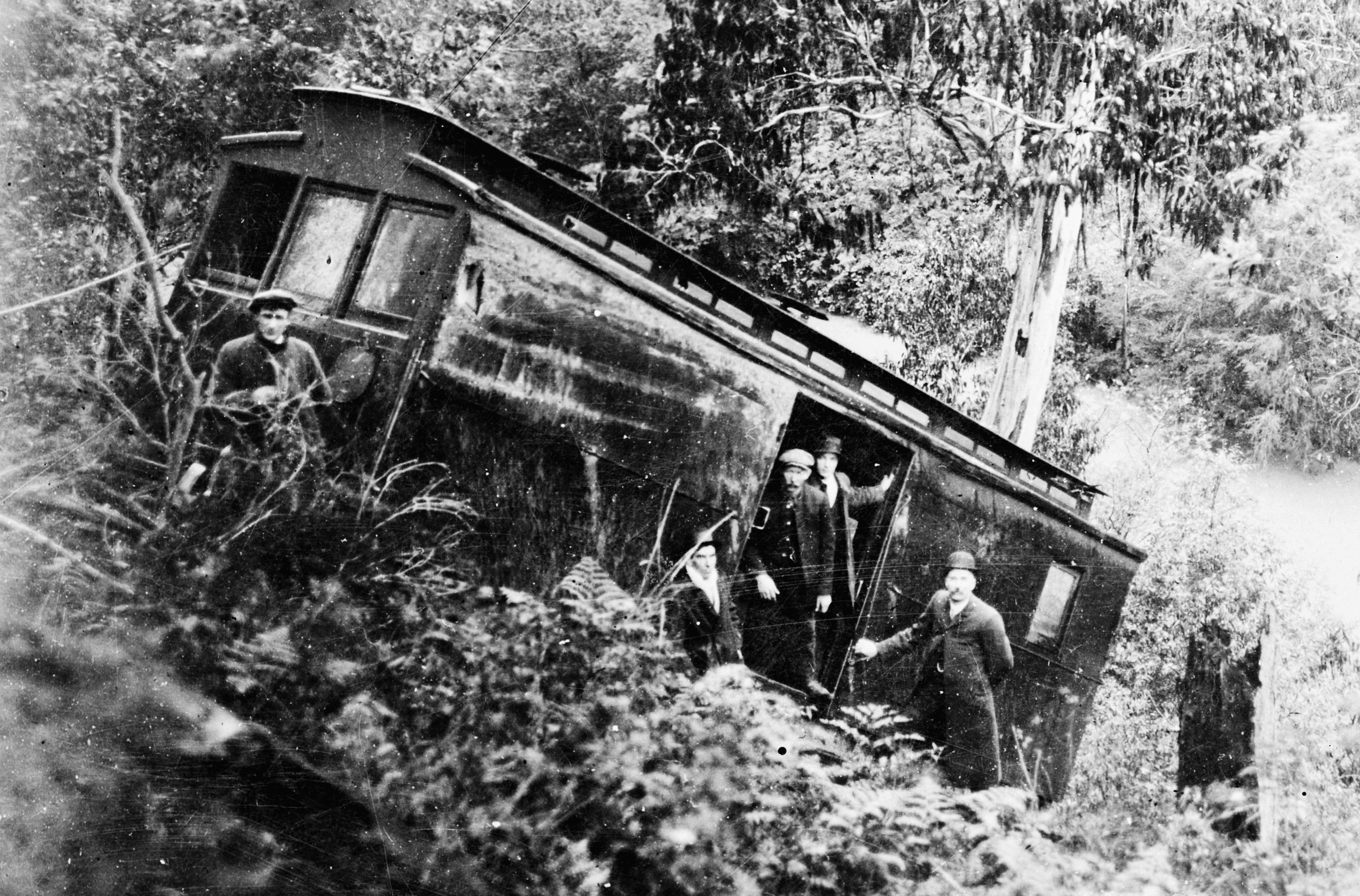
NC van Platina derailment towards Thomson River after 14 September 1915

On 14 September 1915 a special Walhalla-to-Moe train was to shunt at Platina around 8:30 a.m. Regulations required that the guard apply wheel chocks (wooden blocks behind the wheel, over the railhead) as a secondary safety measure in addition to handbrakes, to prevent wagons escaping downhill towards Thompson. Those chocks were not applied, and an NC van with four passengers and ^{N}QR truck loaded with a pair of heavy dynamos started rolling downhill. About a mile down the line, on the second curve, the ^{N}QR derailed and the jerk of that motion snapped the van's drawbar and forced it from the rails, launching it over the side of an embankment. It continued downhill for over 200 feet (61 m), eventually slamming into a tree stump that prevented the whole of the van plunging into the Thompson River (though part of the damaged roof did continue). The van's resting place was only 2 feet (0.61 m) from the edge of a cliff side, between 50 and 100 feet (15 and 30 m) above the water level of the river, resulting in minor injuries to the four passengers. After several failed attempts, including a snapped rope, the van was disassembled so the body and frame could be winched back to the rails separately then railed to Moe three weeks later for repair. Of the four passengers, three (a mother and two young children) apparently jumped from the van before the final collision, while the other woman was slightly injured when a drawer in the van struck her in the chest. None of the passengers were entitled to compensation, as they had signed indemnity forms before being allowed to travel in the non-passenger accommodation.

Track gangers were known to occasionally, illegally, permit locals to run trolleys between Platina and O'Shea's Siding to collect second-grade timber for use on the tramways.

The line beyond Platina was closed on 1 April 1944, and from that point on trains generally terminated at Erica unless specifically required to travel further. Platina was officially the end of the line for this period, but it did not have a run-around loop so trains arriving would have to be broken up and shunted manually, making use of the 1 in 40 downhill slope towards Walhalla. For example, the locomotive and trucks could pull forward into the White Rock Siding, then the guard's van could be rolled forward to the end of the line. The locomotive would then push the wagons back uphill and their handbrakes would be applied for the engine to detach and run forward into the siding again, the wagons rolled downhill to the van, and finally the locomotive could be reattached to the Up end.

The Evans Bros, siding was dismantled by 15 January 1946. The White Rock Lime siding was renamed the Colonial Sugar Refining Company siding on 3 August 1948, and the line beyond Erica closed on 14 October 1952. The infrastructure was recorded as dismantled by 29 September 1953.

The White Rock siding had been 182 ft (55 m) or 6 trucks long. Similar to the siding at Fullwood, the Evans siding had a crossover from the mainline in the centre, with stubs either end. The total siding length was 361 ft (110 m) or 13 trucks long, but in practice only one wagon could have been placed at the up end and perhaps six at the down end, leaving room for an engine and the turnout in the middle. Speed Limit 20 Plus shows an additional siding branching from the Evans Brothers siding in parallel to the main line but only accessible via the up end siding as a headshunt; this is not reflected on other diagrams.

The down end of Platina was marked by a tight (2 ch (40 m) radius), almost 180 degree curve which, after 1927, also passed under the Coopers Creek Road bridge over the railway. The line then ran generally northbound towards Thomson station, though with an enclave halfway along which added about half a mile of track distance while following the Thomson river to keep grades to the manageable range of 1 in 30 to 1 in 35. The section also passed over two small creeks that fed into the Thomson River.

=== Thomson and Walhalla ===
The line reached a local low point at Thomson station, with the elevation of only 717 ft (219 m) being only slightly higher than Gould (607 ft (185 m) and much lower than Erica at 1,321 ft (403 m).

==== Thomson ====
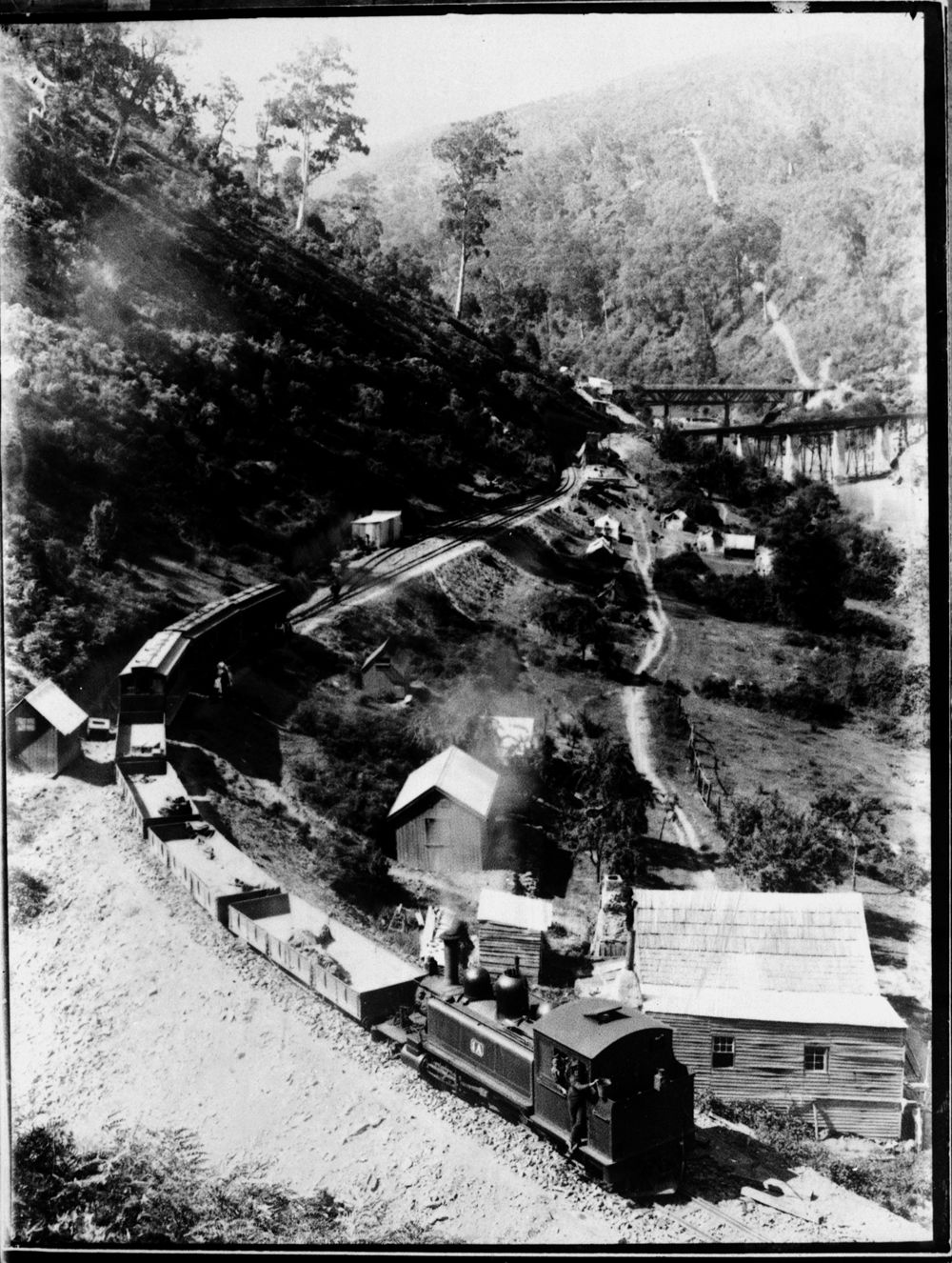
Mixed train at Thomson, bridge over Thomson River under construction (note intermediate support structures).

Thomson station shortly after opening, with train to Walhalla (note station signboard in the middle of the photo, and the cleared site where the run-around loop and shelter had previously been placed).

During construction Thomson had been a temporary terminus for the line, pending delivery and completion of the bridge over the Thomson River. Early photos of the line show a short run-around loop and shelter in the approach to the bridge while it was under construction, and later with the loop and shelter removed but its worksite yet to be cleared. Additionally, a short siding extended north from the loop towards the main road bridge over the Thomson River, and this area was used to store the plate girders and recycled lattice girders while the middle concrete piers were still encased in their formwork. The central lattice girders were placed first, followed by the far-end plates and finally the station-end plates.

At Thomson the railway met a timber tramway, heading north up an 1,880 feet (0.57 km) incline worked by steam winch, then a section of 62 chains (1.2 km) worked by horses. The timber tramway was operational from 1906 to 1910 for the Long Tunnel Gold Mining Company, and transported timber from the Thomson River up the hill then into the Mining Company's network of lines which had been operating from 1885, along the west bank of Stringers Gorge and on both sides of the Thomson River. It network had a gauge of 2 ft 6 in (762 mm) and used iron rails for the incline, while other parts of the system were a mix of iron rails and wooden rails with iron strapping.

When the line opened Thomson was "just another nameboard" and clearing for passengers, though it was the terminating and interchange point for a number of timber tramways that served mines in the mountains between the Thomson River and Walhalla town and station. However, at some point before June 1927 a large tree on a cutting wall above the station had burned through its stump and fallen across the railway, spearing into the ground on the far side of the line, creating rather spectacular photographs with engines posed under the trunk. This log was left in place through the railway's operational life and after closure, only being cut up and removed during the first attempt at preservation in the early 1950s.

Immediately after Thomson station the line swung around another 2 ch (40 m) radius curve, then struck out across the Thomson River on a tall bridge. This featured three timber spans, followed by three steel girders on four concrete piers, and another four timber spans on the far side. Upstream of the bridge was the point where Stringers Creek merged with the Thomson River, then a timber truss road bridge. The central steel bridge span had been recycled from a road bridge over the Murray River at Tocumwal (NSW), while the plate girders either side of the central span were taken from former bridges on the North East railway line and cut to fit.

Thomson station closed on 1 April 1944, with the line from Platina to Walhalla.

==== Stringers Gorge and preservation-era landmarks ====
After passing over the Thomson River bridge, the line ran uphill at gradients mostly around the 1 in 32 to 1 in 35 range. This difficult terrain was almost entirely tight curves following the eastern bank of Stringers Creek as much as possible, and cuttings had to be made into the cliff-face as deep as 20 feet (6 m) into solid stone. Other parts of the line had the track as much as 400 to 500 feet (120 to 150 m) above the water. A story recounted from the Walhalla Chronicle on 3 April 1914, reproduced by Anchen (2012), describes the town of Walhalla receiving "one hundred and thirteen points of rain" in the space of an hour, resulting in the train towards Walhalla essentially running transverse through an impromptu waterfall off the cliffside and down to the River below.

When the Walhalla Goldfields Railway began reconstruction of the line they started with a depot on the Up side of the former Thomson station, and gradually extended the railway towards Walhalla with intermediate temporary stations. The first was Winter Platform, in service from June 1995 to June 1996; it closed when the line was extended to Cascade Bridge Halt. This second temporary terminus was in service from 7 September 1996 until 28 March 1997. The preserved line reached Happy Creek on 1 April 1997 where the preserved line terminated pending reconstruction of the plethora of bridges between there and Walhalla proper in 2002. This last location included a short run-around loop slightly on the up side of the actual station shelter. (Note: Enthusiast site Vicsig says Cascade Halt opened 13 October 1997 and closed 26 October 1998; and Happy Creek Loop and Halt opened 27 March 1998, but these statements are not referenced. A photo is also available at the latter source showing a small galvanised iron passenger shelter at Happy Creek Halt in 2007, though it is not clear whether or not the station was still in use at that time.) Around this site, Happy Creek (the waterway) passed under the railway on a trestle bridge, to merge with Stringers Creek.

The final mile from Happy Creek to Walhalla station remained on the steep uphill gradient. The first half was otherwise uneventful, but the second half saw the line carried over six trestle bridges in close proximity where the valley narrowed. The first two allowed the creek to cross under the railway briefly, passing a former water wheel mentioned by Trainor, followed by another two bridges which anchored the railway to the cliff face rather than actually passing directly over anything. Finally, there was a second site where Stringers Creek passed under the railway and back again, though this time it was met by Little Joe Creek approaching from the east.

==== Walhalla ====
Walhalla station opened on 3 May 1910, though it was probably occupied the day before in preparation when it was allocated a station number "728H" (the eighth station on the line, which overall had identity 728), and the code "WLR". The station was situated at the southern tip of the town in a narrow cutting, at an elevation of 1,021 ft (311 m) above sea level, coincidentally about the same height as Gembrook railway station. Notably, the station itself was still quite a distance away from the town centre.

The first construction train had arrived on 14 February 1910, the first Mixed train on 15 March 1910 and a celebratory official train on 3 May 1910, though the yard was still barren and clearly a construction site. The station building had to be constructed over Stringers Gorge, and so was not completed until June 1913. In the meantime administration of the line was carried out in temporary buildings or guard's vans.

The arrival home signal was on the far end of the last Stringers Creek bridge, and after the bridge was a stub siding nominally provided as run-away protection given the steep slope down back to Thomson. This siding, provided late in the construction program, after the line had officially opened but before the engine shed was built, followed the northern bank of Little Joe Creek for 188 ft (57 m) from the blades of the turnout. By 1927 the end of the siding had become a dumping ground for a local butcher to dispose of unsold tallow.

From here there was a short section of shunting space adjacent to the engine shed and locomotive ash pit, then the mainline became the second of four tracks (counting from left to right, facing north) through the station yard. To the left when facing north there were a pair of crossovers, then the site of the station building (which had to be built after the line opened, on a bridge over Stringers Creek); on the right there were two loop siding tracks, one for stabling and one for goods loading and unloading, also provided with a derrick crane capable of lifting 4 LT (4.1 t). All four tracks converged to the north end headshunt.

Walhalla was the only station on the line to have a dedicated passenger platform, measuring 2.72 ch (55 m) long. A crane was provided in the goods yard with 4 LT (4.1 t) capacity. No.4 road, with the crane and goods shed, had about 240 ft (73 m) or room for about 8 trucks, after No.3 road and its connections had been removed. The yard itself was not flat, which made shunting a risky proposition. A boiling plant for foot-warmers was provided on the rear of the engine shed. Footwarmers were sealed metal containers about 48 by 12 by 5 in^{3} (787 by 197 by 82 cm^{3}), loaded with sodium acetate. In the colder months station staff duties included lighting the boiler (which was a steel drum over a fire grate), collecting batches of footwarmers from the arriving trains and depositing them in the boiling water to charge overnight. The next morning they would be recovered with a steel hook, placed into canvas bags and deposited in each carriage compartment, providing heating to the carriage for at least eight hours; vigorous shaking would encourage further crystallisation and heat release, and the process could be repeated up to twice more to give heating for 20 to 24 hours.

A travelling stationmaster was allocated to the line from 26 February 1912. Track number three, between the mainline and the goods shed, was removed sometime prior to the 1920s, and the original 45 ft (14 m) engine shed was extended to 70 ft (21 m) in 1927, after the Garratt engine was introduced.

The station was altered to no-one in charge status from 13 April 1931 with the station building was disassembled and transferred to Hartwell railway station. (Note: Rails to Walhalla Part 1 (Watson 1980) says the Walhalla station building was dismantled and removed in 1942.) The line closed on 1 April 1944, and the engine shed and down arrival Home signal was abolished by 3 July 1945. The rails were mostly left in place from then until the line was dismantled in the mid to late 1950s.

In the preservation era the Walhalla Goldfields Railway returned to Walhalla in 2002, with a new yard layout situated slightly east of the original and with tighter curves to fit the available space. This caused an issue when Puffing Billy locomotive 7A visited the line in 2011, as it was unable to traverse some of the points at the down (north) end of the yard and this required complex shunting for the few days while the engine was present. The former run-away track had been slightly straightened at the far end and had a shed built over it. A new station building reminiscent of the original was built on the site of the former approach road to the goods shed when the line reopened, and a crew lunch room was added in 2021 using a portable building provided by the Daylesford Spa Country Railway from Bullarto railway station on their line.

== Fleet ==
Engines and rolling stock would have been rotated on an as-required basis, largely to accommodate maintenance requirements that could not be handled on site. The locomotives were originally classed "A", and referred to as, for example, "1A (narrow gauge)", though later documents used the class "^{N}A" to distinguish them from various classes of broad gauge "A" class engines. Similarly, the passenger and goods rolling stock had been delivered with identifying codes equivalent to the broad gauge system, e.g. the open wagons were classed "QR", but by the time the Walhalla line opened these were in the process of being reclassed, e.g. ^{N}QR. Similarly, the passenger and van stock codes were simplified e.g. from ^{N}B^{B} to simply ^{N}B.

=== Locomotives ===
Nearly all of the Victorian Railways' narrow gauge locomotives worked on the Moe - Walhalla line at some point, with the exception of engine 2A (captive to the Wangaratta - Whitfield line) and Garratt locomotive G41 (captive to the Colac - Crowes).

Baldwin-built engine 1A was transferred from Wangaratta to Moe around February 1905 to help with the construction effort, staying until May the same year before moving on to Colac. It returned in November 1907, and stayed on the line (barring occasional maintenance at Newport Workshops) for over half a decade, including working the first train to Upper Moondarra in 1908. It was joined by Vauclain compound locomotive 4A from May 1909 to January 1910, then newly-built 9A through November 1911 (including working the first train into Walhalla), 7A to July 1912, 6A to September 1914, then 10A.

1A left the line to return to Colac in December 1914, being replaced by 3A and in September 1915 a third engine, 5A, joined the line following complaints of insufficient capacity. 10A then left around April 1916, although records are unclear as to its location through April 1917. At that point engine 9A returned, then 3A left in October 1917 leaving only 5A and 9A. In March 1918 the latter was replaced by 13A, and in September 1920 5A was exchanged for returning 3A. 13A left in February 1921, so 5A was the only engine allocated until 14A arrived in September the same year. 10A returned in May 1922, for a brief period of three engines online until 3A left in June, while 14A was swapped for 13A in February 1923.

April 1924 saw 10A swapped out for 15A, then January 1926 brought in 12A, and May 1926 saw 10A returning. At this point the line had four engines allocated. Garratt locomotive G42 was delivered in the middle of 1926, at which point 13A departed for Wangaratta. 12A left shortly thereafter for Upper Ferntree Gully. 8A arrived in January 1927 followed by 5A, the latter swapped for 6A in August the same year. 7A briefly visited in June 1928, for a brief period of six NA engines plus the Garratt, the in October 1928 6A left and was replaced by 9A.

3A left in November 1929 followed by 8A in January 1930 and 15A in April, leaving only the Garratt, 9A and 10A through September 1930 when 6A returned. In May 1932 14A replaced departing 9A, and in December 1932 6A was transferred to Newport Workshops, returning by May 1933. 14A left for the last time in November 1934. Both 5A and 15A came to Moe in January 1935, though the former had returned to Colac by April. Similarly 16A had a brief stint at Moe from November 1935 as its last duty in service, before returning to Newport Workshops for scrapping. 6A left the line in May 1936, but November saw both 7A and 8A return, for about one and two months respectively.

9A returned from rebuild at Newport Workshops in May 1937, and (with the exception of another trip for maintenance in 1939) stayed with the line until it was withdrawn and scrapped in late 1953, being replaced by 7A through November 1954. 15A stayed at Moe through October 1937, then was replaced by 17A (on its first allocation to the line), and 12A operated on the line between March 1938 and March 1943, then being replaced by 5A through to March 1949. In June 1941 11A made a brief appearance, 17A left in April 1950 for scrapping, and was replaced by 12A. Both 12A and the Garratt were withdrawn in August 1954, the former being stored at Newport Workshops for fifteen years before being restored in preservation, and the latter having a brief stint sharing duties with classmate G41 at Colac before being withdrawn and stored. Both these engines are now preserved at the Puffing Billy Railway.

Overall, and discounting time in maintenance, G42 spent nearly its entire career with the Victorian Railways on the Moe - Walhalla line, followed by 9A and 10A at about half each, 17A at about 40%, 1A at over 30% (including the time before the line officially opened), 12A, 13A and 15A a quarter each, 3A, 5A, 6A and 14A around 10-15% each, and 4A, 7A, 8A, 11A and 16A barely any time at all.

7A returned to the Walhalla line for a few days in May 2010, both as itself and wearing plates of 9A for various celebrations relating to the line's opening a century prior.

=== Carriages, Trucks and Vans ===
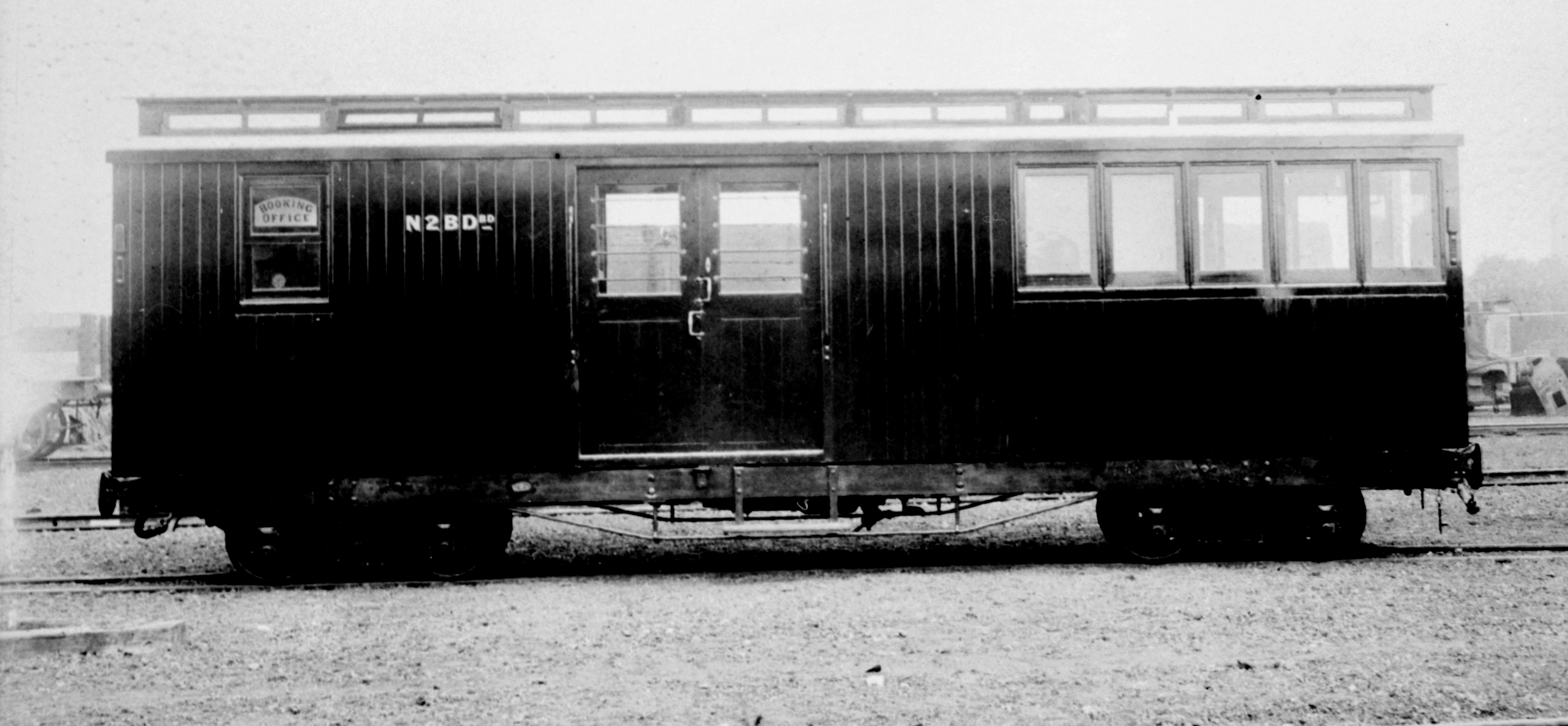
Combined passenger and guard's van 2BD^{BD} with N prefix added. Passengers entered from the ^{N}B^{B} platform through a door at the right end of this carriage. Later reclassed 2NBC.

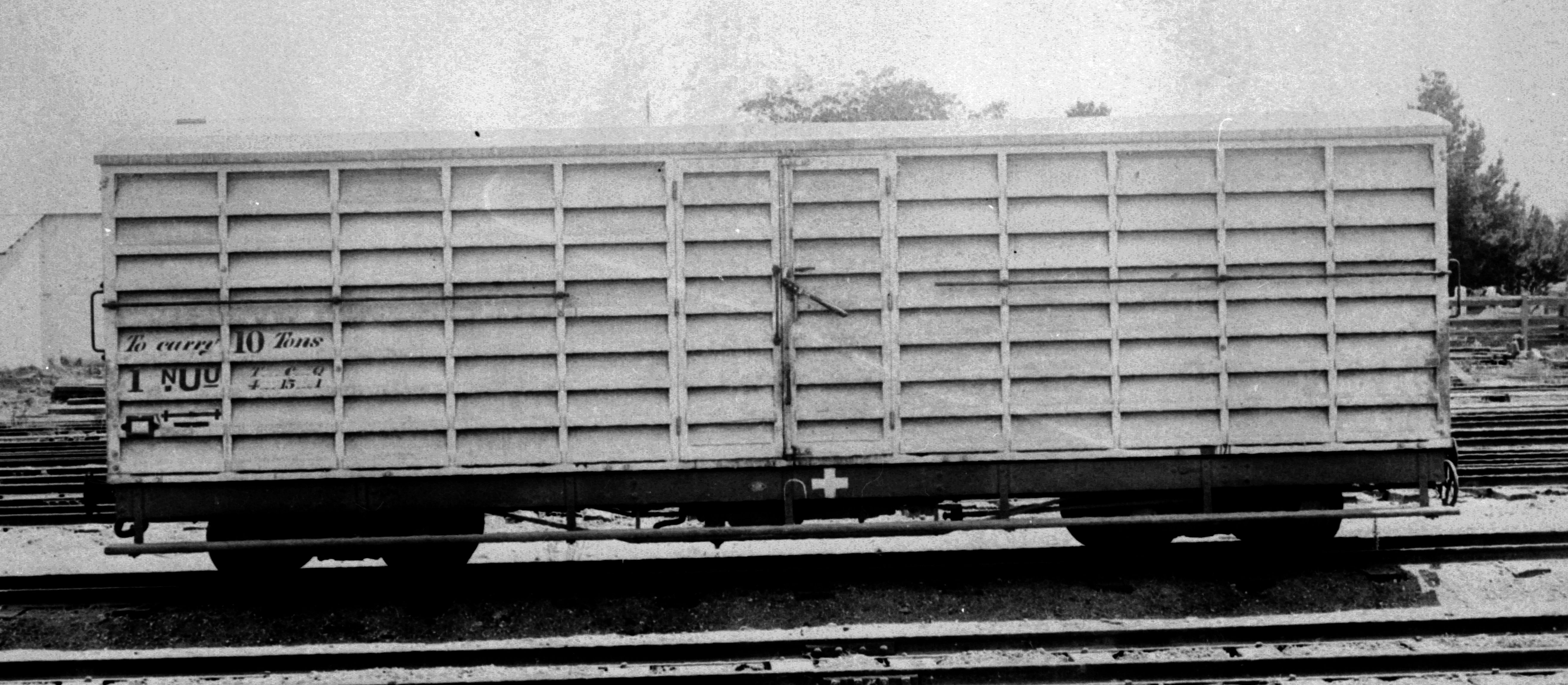
Louvre van 1^{N}U^{U}; later reclassed 1NU. Van 1NH was about the same size, but with smooth sides and two sets of louvred doors per side.

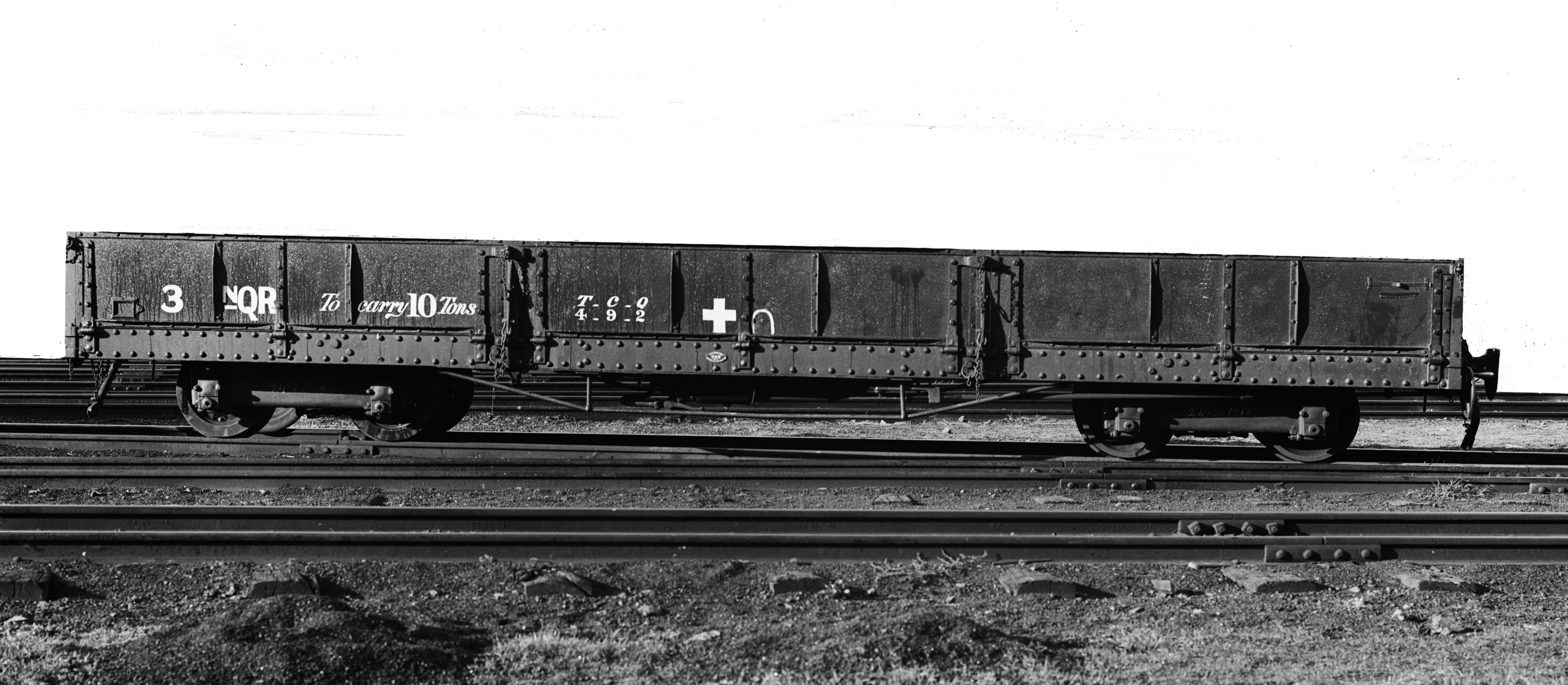
Narrow gauge open wagon 3^{N}QR. Later reclassed 3NQ. These vehicles sometimes ran as flat wagons with sides and/or ends removed.

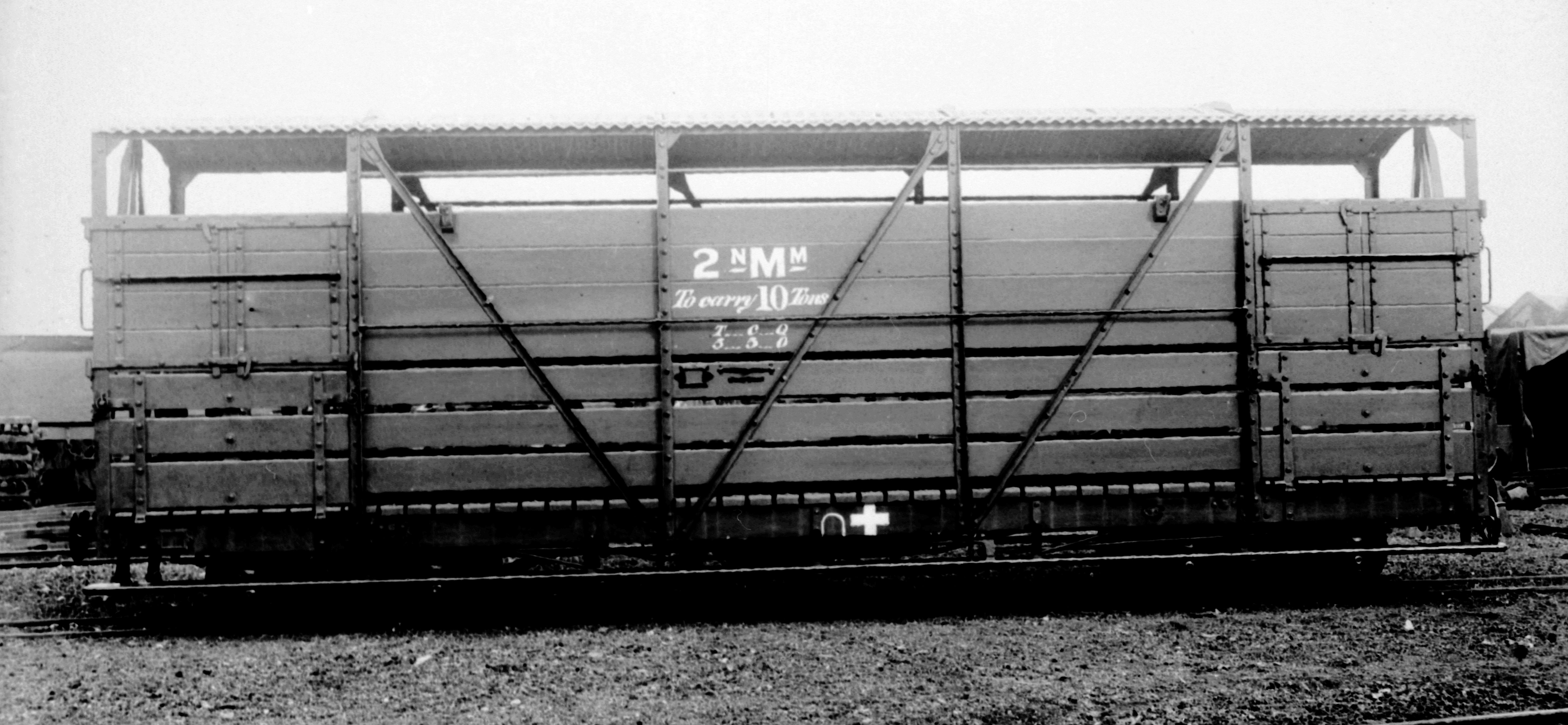
Cattle wagon 2^{N}M^{M}; later reclassed 2NM.

By the time the line officially opened it has already seen trains in service for a few years, and these used an assortment of passenger and goods stock from the narrow gauge fleet, including wagon 20^{N}QR and at least one ^{N}B^{B} saloon carriage. In September 1909 these were joined by composite compartment First and Second class carriages 3 and 4 ^{N}AB^{AB},; guard's van 1^{N}D^{D} entered service on the same day, so it too was likely for the Walhalla line. The photo at the top of this article shows locomotive 1A hauling three unidentified ^{N}QR trucks configured for passenger traffic, followed by carriage 4^{N}AB and (based on the height difference) van 4^{N}BC. 1910 also saw van 7NBC enter service on the Walhalla line.

Saloon carriage 5NB, provided with a handbrake at one end and never upgraded from kerosene to pintsch gas lighting, was noted as a permanent member of the Walhalla line fleet from 1920 through to withdrawal on 2 October 1950.

First class passenger accommodation was abolished on the Walhalla line on 9 July 1923, with fares adjusted accordingly. 4NAB had been altered to second class accommodation in mid-1917 as 24NB, and in August 1923 it was followed by 1, 2 and 3NAB to 25, 26 and 27NB. Notably, 1 and 2NAB were converted at Upper Ferntree Gully, while 3NAB was converted at Moe; this makes it likely that the cars essentially kept their original allocations through that point, and that the 1917 conversion of 4NAB to 24NB was made to reflect demand on the Moe - Walhalla line.

In June 1910 van 1^{N}PH entered service on the line, with a six-ton compartment for goods and four-ton compartment for explosive powder transport to mines, though it was reconfigured to entirely normal goods capacity shortly thereafter. Many of the NQR trucks allocated to the Walhalla line had their centre doors removed and replaced with a timber panels flanking an iron door, and with raised sides and a canvas roof, though none of those modified and reclassed to NBH passenger stock were ever transferred from the Gembrook line. Some such trucks, including Nos 114 and 140, were modified with an alternate handbrake arrangement to allow them to be used as trailing brake vans during particularly heavy passenger traffic seasons.

Around 1914-1915, in addition to the third engine being allocated to the line, ten more trucks were provided following complaints of insufficient capacity. Details as to which trucks these were is unclear, since the last ^{N}QR trucks had entered service in early 1914.

In 1940 the line fleet comprised 5, 10, 14 and 27NB, 3NBC, 1NC, 6 and 13NU, 14NM, and a total of 77x NQR trucks including some available for passenger transport.

At the line's closure the fleet was reduced to 7NBC, 1NC, 6NU, 14NM, and 45x NQ trucks; including NQ no.192 fitted with a 2,000 imp gal (9,100 L) gallon water tank, and the first and last NQ wagons nos 1 and 218. 7NBC operated on the last train from Erica to Moe in 1954, and 1NC was withdrawn from Moe in 1955.

== Traffic ==
Over the whole of the line's existence, the average annual outwards patronage was 6,371; the inwards goods was 4,465 long tons (4,537 t), the outwards goods 30,338 long tons (30,825 t), and the revenue (raw numbers, ignoring inflation) £20,150/8/7.2. The peak values were 13,136 passengers and 13,100 long tons (13,300 t) inwards goods in the 1911-1912 financial year, 47,473 long tons (48,235 t) outwards goods and £29,513/8/- revenue in the 1935-1936 financial year.

Walhalla provided the highest proportion of outwards passengers through to the end of the 1923-1924 financial year after which Erica took precedence. Over all years, Walhalla averaged 38% of the inwards goods loading against Platina (including its sidings) 28% and the sum of Erica and nearby Collins' Siding 20%, with the balance fairly evenly spread across all other locations that accepted goods. For outbound goods loading Walhalla was less than 1% of the lifetime total; 41% was from Erica and Collins' Siding, O'Shea, Fullwood and Knott's Sidings together were 33%, and Platina was 15%, with similar proportions for whole-of-life revenue.

=== Fares ===
As early as December 1904, the Victorian Railways started issuing combined rail and road coach tickets for the Walhalla corridor. In the early days these would have been for a train to Moe then connecting coach to Walhalla.

When the line opened goods and passengers were charged normal distance rates as established across the Victorian network, but with an extra surcharge of "Local Rates" that were intended to pay for the working expenses and interest charges of the loan used to build the line until such time as the revenue in and of itself could cover that cost. However, the Local Rates system was objected to on the grounds that it suppressed competitiveness of local suppliers against older lines that did not have or predated the Local Rates system, so it was abolished from 1 July 1914.

Return tickets on the line ceased to be available from 17 May 1920, but were reintroduced on 1 July 1927. In the intermediate period passengers travelling both ways on the line would need to buy a separate one-way ticket at each end of their trip. First class tickets were withdrawn in July 1923, matching the conversion date of the remaining composite carriage 3NAB to 27NB. Excursion tickets were restricted from March 19036 when normal ticket prices were dropped, and completely withdrawn from 1 December 1938. Mountainous District tickets, for use on the one-way loops via the Walhalla and Warburton lines, were available annually between 15 November and 30 April and valid for the second portion of the trip in up to three months. Tickets were checked by station staff at Walhalla, Erica and Moe.

=== Patronage ===
Fiddian (1982) provides the following outwards passenger numbers for the line, by financial year:

Station	1911-12	1914-15	1927-28
Gooding	71	72	5
Gould	409	705	1186
Moondarra	593	672	484
Erica	1506	1590	3809
Knott's Siding	409	190	386
Platina	767	411	571
Thomson	406	15	43
Walhalla	8629	4600	1892
Total	12,424	8255	8376

He also notes that in 1911-12, Walhalla had received 12,399 LT (12,598 t), while Harris (later Erica) generated 10,581 LT (10,751 t); by 1927-1928 the highest outwards freight loadings were recorded at Knott's (Fullwood) Siding, O'Shea and Bennett's Siding, and Platina; although it is worth noting the latter figure may not represent the peak of the Tyers Valley tramway interchange loading.

for the months of February through April 1941, during World War II and with one Walhalla and two Erica return trips per week, the average patronage per trip was 3.6 passengers on departure from Moe, 3.4 by arrival then 2.8 on departure at Erica, and 2.1 passengers on arrival at Walhalla. On departing from Walhalla the average patronage was 2.8 passengers, increasing to 3.2 by arrival at Erica and 3.5 on departure, with 4.0 passengers when terminating at Moe.

=== Goods loading ===
As notes elsewhere, after the gold mines wound down the Walhalla line's primary source of revenue was farming produce and timber extraction.

During the construction period most goods could be conveyed between Moe and Moondarra (later Erica) on Tuesdays starting from 15 June 1908, with a flat rate charge of 30 shillings per truck and loading and unloading to be managed by the consignor and consignee respectively, with no insurance for damaged goods being available. Goods to be consigned from any station in Victoria other than Moe were instructed to send the goods there, and then make local arrangements for the construction train traffic.

When the line opened, goods loads to Pearson, Harris (later Erica) and Walhalla were accepted so long as they were "not requiring crane power or shed accommodation". Goods loads for the stations were collected at Melbourne Yard No.30 door of "A" shed, by 9:30am on Mondays, Wednesdays and Fridays, and had to weigh less than 2 LT (2.2 short tons) Locomotive water supplies were available at Walhalla, Harris, Tyers River and Moe, though the scheduled stop at Tyers River was only for engine requirements and not for passengers or goods.

Early on, trains would stop as required in the bush to collect logs that had been left lineside by various horse-worked tramways. Typically the logs would be pulled across skids into the wagons, with three logs permitted per ^{N}QR wagon. Trains would move forward after each wagon was loaded to allow the next to be filled. The charge to sawmill operators for this service was £-/9/- per fifteen minute time block.

There was only one butcher at Moe in the early years of the line, Mr. John H. Pruden, so he was the supplier of all meat for the corridor between Moe and Walhalla. Orders would be attached to a sugar bag on the morning train, and the meat requested would be despatched by the return trip.

Between November 1911 and May 1912, 38,000 sleepers had been collected along the line for export around the state.

Records include the number of livestock trucks consigned to and from each station from 1916 onwards; the peak was 169 trucks in the 1926-1927 financial year, consisting of 43 trucks of horses and five of sheep from Moondarra, plus 1 and 2 respectively arriving; 1 truck of sheep to and another from Watson; 7 of horses, 3 of cattle and 9 of pigs delivered to Erica while 14 trucks of horses, 6 of cattle, 7 of sheep and 2 of pigs were waybilled from there. At Walhalla only 1 truck of pigs was consigned outwards, while 41 trucks of cattle, 24 of sheep and 2 of pigs arrived. The records for that year also show small amounts of livestock revenue at Gould and Knott's Siding, but not assigned to particular categories.

As noted above, when the line opened mail traffic to and from Walhalla was still under contract with the previous operators. This appears to have changed on 5 September 1910 with the provision of mail tricycle services on the days the trains weren't running However, as of 9 September 1940 a road motor service was provided for mail along the line in lieu of the tricycle service.

==== Tramway transfers ====
Occasionally, various tramways in the region would request use of the Walhalla line to transfer their locomotives between various, otherwise disconnected parts of their networks.

In October 1939 one such engine was transferred from Moondarra to Knott's Siding. This was achieved by having the regular No.1 Mixed train operate from Moe to Erica on a Staff Ticket and carrying a Master Key, thus allowing the Train Staff to be transported (by the same train) as far as Moondarra, where it was met by the engine crew who had been driven to Moondarra by car. On arrival of the Mixed train at Erica its Guard took responsibility for the signalling, sending a message back to Moondarra confirming the line was available for the locomotive to move forward. The locomotive was to wait at Erica for No.4 Up Mixed and No.8 Up Postal Motor, then proceed to Knott's Siding carrying the Train Staff for the Erica - Walhalla section. On arrival, the tramway company was to provide a car for conveying the extra train crew back to Moe, and the Train Staff to Erica.

Another such instance was in February 1944, when the Forest Commission's Fordson Tractor engine was transferred from Erica to Collins' Siding. For this move, after No.17 Mixed arrived at Erica the Train Staff was taken by a railway employee who accompanied the Tractor back to Collins' Siding, after which the employee and Train Staff were returned to Erica to resume normal operation. About a month later the process was reversed. When the process was repeated in 1950, the qualified railway employee was specified as the Block and Signal Inspector, and the local Ganger had to check the track after the Commission's tractor engine had passed over to make sure no damage had occurred.

== Operations ==
=== Safeworking ===
As noted above, the line was always worked by the Train Staff and Ticket safeworking system. This was initially as one block Moe to Walhalla, later divided into two as Moe - Harris/Erica and Harris/Erica - Walhalla. In the inter-war period Erica was downgraded to an Intermediate Special Block Post, allowing following trains but not trains in opposite directions by telephoning the prior station to advise when the first train had passed. Later, Erica was restored as a Train Staff and Ticket station, and Gould was introduced as a Block Post in its own right between 1921 and 1931. Even as the line progressively closed from the north end, the Train Staff at Erica remained engraved with the section to "Walhalla".

The various intermediate sidings were originally controlled by Annett Locks, with the Key attached to the Train Staff. In September 1920 these locks were replaced with Staff Locks, so the Train Staff itself became the key. A Master Key was provided on the line to enable trains running on Train Staff Ticket to shunt at intermediate staff-locked locations if required. All movements of the Key away from its dedicated locked box were recorded, and if it was to be transferred but not used on a specific trip it needed to be waybilled as a "value parcel" with signatures provided every time it changed hands. The key could only be used during daylight hours, and not in foggy conditions.

Similarly, trains were only permitted to shunt at Collins Siding, Platina and White Rock Siding during daylight with clear visibility,

In 1927 the rules were altered such that the mail motors were permitted to operate without the Train Staff or Ticket, so long as the train running behind the mail service was held for at least fifteen minutes and issued a "Notice of Train Ahead" so that the driver could keep a good lookout. This would be done at the ends of the line, and again at Erica. In these scenarios the drivers of each mail motor were reminded to ensure they had a key for Erica's station building.

Signals on the line were generally left at the "Proceed" position unless otherwise required, which was generally safe because the line rarely had more than one train operating along its entire length.

At some point, probably much later in the line's operation, trains of up to ten vehicles were permitted to operate between Erica and Platina without a guard's van; probably to make shunting at that location easier.

There was a Train Examiner role at Moe, but otherwise that job of checking brakes and other fittings before a train departed its origin point was the responsibility of the Fitter in Charge.

As of 1928, Knott's Siding, White Rock Lime Siding and Platina could be worked by Mixed trains, but the air brake of the train, all hand brakes, and hand scotches had to be applied before the Guard could authorise the locomotive to be detached.

==== Landslips ====
Running through such mountainous terrain, landslides, rockfalls and trees falling over the line were significant risks on the section between Erica and Walhalla so it became common practice to run an early morning ganger trolley to inspect the line before the first train was permitted to run each day.

The first recorded landlsip was on 12 June 1911, which blocked the line near Harris (later Erica) and required temporarily running the service with two trains, each terminating adjacent to the blocked line for passengers and mail to transfer. A week later the line between Thomson and Walhalla was blocked, and passengers were frustrated enough to walk the remaining distance ("a few hundreds yards") to Walhalla; the train that day arrived at Walhalla five hours late.

In 1913 a series of landslips at the Up side of the station, opposite the arrival Home signal, forced the line to be diverted. The first slip was over the night of 5–6 November and prevented the morning Walhalla train from passing Harris, so a special train was organised from the Moe end to connect from the 7:52 a.m. train from Melbourne and passengers and mail were swapped between the two train sets either side of the landslip, where the rails were suspended in mid-air with sleepers attached. The passengers of the train from Walhalla did not arrive in Melbourne until 10:30 p.m. that day, and goods traffic on the line was suspended pending repairs. Crews working on the line expected to have it back in order by the following evening, but full service did not resume until 10 November. This was reported as the fourth time the land had subsided at the Up side of the station. Another landslip happened only three days later, with the immediate solution of mail being conveyed by the track maintenance crew's rail motorcycle; passengers had to wait for a replacement train from Moe as per the previous week. The line had been fine when inspected at 6 a.m. that day, so there hadn't been enough time to prepare the second engine and train for the relief connection. This time, the gap under the line was described as about 0.5 chains (10 metres) long, 12 feet (3.7 metres) deep and 15 feet (4.6 metres) wide, and requiring 500 cubic yards (380 cubic metres) to fill. Three trucks of filling had been poured in by 15 November but this had all been washed out by further subsidence the following day, and another 13 trucks were unloaded into the site; even that proved insufficient, and by 19 November another slip was deemed likely only 30 feet (9.1 metres) away. These predictions were prudent, with the line covered over by a slip on 25 November. This, too, was cleared, but shortly thereafter the line was permanently diverted to the south around the site for a length of just over 10 chains (200 metres). The station's Down arrival Home signal was left in place following the diversion and thus was a significant distance away from the running line it applied to. This deviation was visible when looking west from the road bridge at the station, and the result of the deviation is visible in a photo dated circa 1915, in "Rails to old Walhalla" (2015)

Another landslip was recorded between Knott's Siding and Platina, so trains had to operate between Moe and Erica only from 7 to 14 June that year.

==== Fires and floods ====
The line was closed in January 1926 due to bushfires, and again in 1934 and 1939. During the 1934 fires the train and engine crew were stranded at Walhalla, as the bridges had been burned down. In 1938 a truck loaded with bagged lime at Platina caught fire. A section of line near Gooding was washed away in 1944.

=== Runtimes ===
As of 1935, the runtimes for the line were:

Down	Engine Running Time, Mixed load, Minutes		Engine Running Time, Goods load, Minutes		Up	Engine Running Time, Mixed or Goods load, Minutes	
Moe to-	NA; Engines	G Engines	NA; Engines	G Engines	Walhalla to-	NA; Engines	G Engines
Gooding	12	12	14	12	Thomson	20	20
Gould	30	35	36	35	Platina	13	12
Moondarra	36	30	44	35	O’Shea & Bennett’s Siding	16	15
Watson	8	8	9	8	Knott’s Siding	3	3
Collins' Siding	4	4	4	4	Erica	10	10
Erica	7	7	9	7	Collins' Siding	7	5
Knott’s Siding	8	8	8	8	Watson	6	5
O’Shea & Bennett’s Siding	3	3	3	3	Moondarra	9	9
Platina	12	12	12	12	Gould	23	23
Thomson	14	14	14	14	Gooding	29	28
Walhalla	14	14	14	14	Moe	12	12
Total	148	147	167	152	Total	148	142

The 1943 schedule does not show times between Erica and Platina, so Down trains are given two minutes fewer in that section along with Up trains hauled by NA Class engines; an Up train worked by a Garratt was given one minute less than previously. Additionally, all trains were given five minutes at Gould and at Erica, each in both directions, for engine requirements like cleaning the fires or topping up water. If a train was worked by an NA engine from Erica to Moe, it could haul up to 15 vehicles instead of the usual 10, at a maximum of 110 long tons (110 t; 120 short tons), with an extra five minutes allotted to the runtime for the section to allow time for the train crew to apply and release hand brakes as required. The same extra time was required for double NA locomotives over that section hauling 15 vehicles up to 220 long tons (220 t; 250 short tons).

The 1949 runtimes are identical to 1943, save for the deletion of Thomson and Walhalla, and all references to extra time permitted for longer double-headed trains.

Speed Limit 20 Plus says that trains were permitted 148 minutes from Moe to Walhalla and 167 minutes on from Walhalla to Moe (147 and 152 minutes respectively for the Garratt). These times included the five minutes in each direction at Gould and Erica to top up water.

=== Maximum loads ===
By 1916 the maximum train loads were 90 long tons (91 t; 100 short tons) Moe to Harris and 80 long tons (81 t; 90 short tons) Harris to Walhalla, with 80 long tons (81 t; 90 short tons) Walhalla to Harris then 100 long tons (100 t; 110 short tons) Harris to Moe. Instructions for passenger and mixed trains, issued in 1923, showed a maximum of 10 vehicles or 55 long tons (56 t; 62 short tons) for the whole of the Down trip (although the lightest passenger stock, NB saloon carriages, weighed 8 long tons (8.1 t; 9.0 short tons) each) and the same for the return Walhalla-Erica then 10 vehicles up to 100 long tons (100 t; 110 short tons) Erica to Walhalla.

In 1926 Mixed trains worked by NA engines were still restricted to a maximum of ten vehicles, with load limits of 60 long tons (61 t; 67 short tons) Moe-Walhalla, 55 long tons (56 t; 62 short tons) Walhalla-Erica and 100 long tons (100 t; 110 short tons) Erica to Moe; Goods trains were 14 vehicles for 80 long tons (81 t; 90 short tons) Moe-Erica, then 12/80 to Walhalla, 12/70 Walhalla-Erica and 16/110 Erica-Moe. Loads for the Garratt engine on Mixed trains were 18/180 or 22/140 Moe to Erica, 12/180 both ways between Erica and Walhalla, 18/240 Erica to Moe; and the Garratt on a goods train was 24 vehicles, 140 long tons (140 t; 160 short tons) Moe-Walhalla, 180 long tons (180 t; 200 short tons) Walhalla-Erica and 240 long tons (240 t; 270 short tons) Erica to Moe.

In 1935 the load schedules were standardised regardless of whether a train was a Mixed or Goods service, with 14/80 Moe-Knott's Siding (24/140 for the Garratt) then 12/80 (24/140) Knott's to Walhalla. Walhalla to O'Shea and Bennett's Siding was 12/70 (24/140), then 12/70 (24/180) O'Shea & Bennett's Siding to Knott's Siding, 14/80 (24/180) Knott's Siding to Erica, and 16/110 (24/140) Erica to Moe.

The 1943 table shows 14/80 for a single NA Moe-Erica then 12/80 to Walhalla; 22/160 for double NA locomotives the whole length of the line; or either 24/240 or 18/180 for a Garratt the whole length of the line. On the return, 12/70 for a single NA, 22/140 for two, or either 24/140 or 18/180 for a Garratt between Walhalla and Erica, then 16/110, 22/220 or 24/240 respectively from Erica to Moe.

Per Rule 18 of the General Rules for Working the Westinghouse Automatic Air Brake, these numbers would be reported by the guard of the train to the driver in the form "10 for 60" (for example), so the driver would know what to expect and how to best utilise the locomotive, as well as where the train would need to be parked to facilitate shunting at each intermediate stop. The number of trucks included any passenger carriages and the guard's van. On broad and standard gauge trains the report would include a third figure for equivalent vehicle length, rounding bogie wagons up to the nearest multiple of fixed-wheel stock, but nearly all rolling stock on the narrow gauge was of uniform length so that element was not necessary.

== Services ==
The opening service was a mixed train departing Walhalla on Tuesdays, Thursdays and Saturdays at 6:40 am, arriving Moe 9:25 am to meet the 9:50 am train to Melbourne. The return train left Moe at 11:50 am the same day, having connected from the outbound Melbourne train that passed Moe at 11:26 am, and arrived back at Walhalla at 2:50 pm. Mail traffic remained with the road coach hauliers because that contract had not yet expired. From 2 September 1910 an additional mail service was provided by motorised rail tricycle on Mondays, Wednesdays and Fridays, departing Moe 12 noon, arriving Walhalla 3 pm and returning 3:30 pm to 6:15 pm. The service was operated by the Way and Works staff members. Given that the regular train started and ended trips at Walhalla, it is probable that the mail service operated under track maintenance rules and therefore was exempt from the Train Staff and Ticket requirements. From 8 November 1910 trains in both directions were instructed to serve passengers at Copper Mine Siding (later Platina), between Thomson and Murie, and that tickets to and from Murie were to be issued for that stop.

In May 1912 the thrice-weekly Mixed train started to run on Mondays as well, with the mail tricycle reduced to only Wednesdays and Fridays.

By mid-1912 Walhalla residents were beginning to question whether the town had been better off with the former daily coach service, than the thrice-weekly mixed train service, and calls were made for passenger accommodation on the off-days when the mail trolleys operated.

From May 1913 an additional goods trains was scheduled for Wednesday and Friday, if required only, leaving Walhalla at 8:00 am, turning at Moe 11:30 am to 2:30 pm and returning by 5:30 pm, crossing the mail tricycle at Harris around 4:20 to 4:30 pm. Under the rules of Train Staff and Ticket, this goods train would not have been permitted to depart Walhalla or Moe until the previous mail tricycle trip had passed Erica (and later Gould).

By 3 August 1915 the schedule had changed to return Mixed trips on Mondays, Wednesdays and Saturdays instead, still with a 6:40 am train from Walhalla (arriving Moe 9:25am) but the return trip left Moe at Noon for a 3 pm return. This schedule also applied on Tuesdays, Thursdays and Fridays using a motorised rail tricycle to convey mail along the route. Additionally, there was provision in the schedule for an "if required" goods train from Walhalla at 8:30 am and from Moe at 2:30 pm, with three hours allowed in each direction. The change to the mail service removed the need for trains to cross at Erica on a regular basis.

By December 1923 the trains had been renumbered; previously they were No.1 Mixed, No.2 Tricycle and No.3 Goods conditional in both directions; now they were 1, 3 and 5 respectively for Down trips, and 2, 3 and 6 for Up trips. A note was also made that if the conditional goods trains operated on a given day, they were also to convey the mail with the relevant tricycle trips cancelled.

A more complex timetable was introduced by December 1925, with twelve down and thirteen up trips scheduled including conditional services:

Train	From	Departs	To	Arrives	Type	Days	Notes
1‡	Moe	5:30 am	O’Shea & Bennett’s Siding	8:20 am	Goods	As required	May terminate Erica (7:30 am) if arranged by S.M. Moe, and return as No.8 or No.16.
3‡	Moe	10:00 am	Platina	1:00 pm	Goods	As required	3 or 5, not both
5‡	Moe	10:45 am	O’Shea & Bennett’s Siding	1:20 pm	Goods	As required	3 or 5, not both
7	Moe	12 noon	Walhalla	3:15 pm	Mixed	Mon, Wed, Sat	
9	Moe	12 noon	Walhalla	3 pm	Tricycle	Tue, Thu	9 or 11, not both
11‡	Moe	12 noon	Walhalla	3:15 pm	Goods	Tue, Thu	9 or 11, not both
11	Moe	12 noon	Walhalla	3:15 pm	Goods	Fri	Passenger car attached
13‡	Moe	1:00 pm	Erica	3:05 pm	Goods	As required	
2	Walhalla	6 am	Moe	9:35 am	Mixed	Mon, Wed, Sat	
4	Walhalla	6:30 am	Moe	9:25 am	Tricycle	Tue, Thu	4 or 6, not both
6‡	Walhalla	6:40 am	Moe	9:40 am	Goods	Tue, Thu	4 or 6, not both
6	Walhalla	6:40 am	Moe	9:40 am	Goods	Fri	Passenger car attached
8	Erica	8:45 am	Moe	11:00 am	Goods	As required	8 or 10, not both
10	O’Shea & Bennett’s Siding	8:45 am	Moe	11:45 am	Goods	As required	8 or 10, not both
12	Platina	1:15 pm	Moe	4:30 pm	Goods	As required	12 or 14, not both
14	O’Shea & Bennett’s Siding	1:30 pm	Moe	4:30 pm	Goods	As required	12 or 14, not both
16	Erica	3:45 pm	Moe	6:15 pm	Goods	As required	
Notes: ‡ is for Conditional trains, only operated if organised in advance. Gould may open as a Temporary Staff and Ticket station when required and published, or as a Telephone Block Post.

It is not known how often any of the conditional services operated. At this time the Walhalla line had only two locomotives allocated, nos 13A and 15A; 10A had left on 15 May 1924, and would not be replaced until 12A arrived on 12 January 1926.

=== Introduction of the Garratt ===
The memoirs of Douglas Trainor include a period where he worked as a Guard on the Walhalla line, joining thre others, from June to December 1927, and briefly again in 1930. He noted that the Guard's van had been divided into two compartments, segregating the goods compartment from a travelling booking office stocked with tickets, stationary, parcels stamps and associated equipment, as well as a portable telephone that could be connected to the wires running the length of the line in case of emergency. (Note: The provision of the portable phone, as of early 1936, was a feature only of the Crowes, Gembrook and Walhalla (but not Whitfield) narrow gauge lines, and the broad gauge lines to Mount Gambier, Sea Lake to Kulwin, and Ultima to Robinvale. The equipment was to be tested weekly, and (except for the Gembrook line) required one wire to be hooked to the lineside phone lines and the other, attached to an iron spike, had to be driven in (preferably damp) ground, to create a circuit.) The role of the Guard was to list the wagon loads for each train and report any late running, as well as being responsible for the general safety of the train and its passengers. This latter role included the application of a specified number of hand brakes whenever the locomotive was detached for shunting, to avoid the risk of a run-away.

When the Garratt was introduced to the line in 1926, the maximum capacity of each train was increased significantly. On Trainor's first day the train was hauled by Garratt locomotive G42. The train was supposed to run from Walhalla to Moe four days per week, departing 6:40am to meet the 9:50am train to Melbourne, then leave Moe at midday to return to Walhalla at 3:40pm, (Note: 3:15pm in 1926.) but Trainor said that the timetable had not been sufficiently altered when the Garratt was introduced, and the resulting increase in wagon loads and shunting requirements left the train crew with very little spare time for paperwork.

Special instructions were issued to enginemen (drivers and firemen) of the Garratt engines; the following excerpt is dated 1943.

CONTROLLING TRAINS HAULED BY GARRATT LOCOMOTIVE

1. To provide for efficient brake control and also to prevent over-heating or skidding of the tyres, the following instructions must be strictly observed by the train crew:-
  1. As the adhesion to a certain extent depends on the weight of the water in the front tank and the weight of water and coal on the rear bogie, it is, therefore, necessary to have the tanks as full as possible when heavy braking is required.
  2. The front bogie may skid without the Driver obtsaining the early indications which are usually observed when the rear bogie skids. The precautions to be taken are:-
    1. Fill the tanks at Erica on the Up and isolate the front tank prior to descending the falling gradients.
    2. Fill the tanks at Erica on the Down when the gross load will amount to 150 tons between Erica and Thomson
    3. See that the Brake is uniformly adjusted on both bogies at all times.
  3. A Terminal Test of the Train Brakes must be carried out at Erica prior to departing on the Up.
  4. To adjust Engine Brake screw Hand Brake off, screw up both box nuts on the pull rods until the brake blocks are firmly on the wheels, then slacked off both box nuts one full turn. This adjustment will give a uniform distribution of braking power. One Bogie Brake must not be adjusted independently of the other.
  5. Hand Brakes are to be applied on loaded "N.Q.R". trucks, and must be in operation as set out in the following table:-

Up Trains
Section	Gross Load in Tons	Truck Brakes to be applied firmly	Van Brake to be applied firmly.
Erica to Collins' Siding	90 to 110	-	1
Erica to Collins' Siding	111 to 150	-	1
Erica to Collins' Siding	151 to 240	-	1
Moondara [sic] to Gould	90 to 110	1	1
Moondara [sic] to Gould	111 to 150	2	1
Moondara [sic] to Gould	151 to 240	3	1
89 Mile Brake Board to Gooding	90 to 110	-	1
89 Mile Brake Board to Gooding	111 to 150	-	1
89 Mile Brake Board to Gooding	151 to 240	-	1

Down Trains
Top of Grade near Mileage 100 miles to Thomson	90 to 110	1	1
Top of Grade near Mileage 100 miles to Thomson	111 to 150	2	1
Top of Grade near Mileage 100 miles to Thomson	151 to 240	3	1

2. When the train has been stopped at the locations set out above, for the purpose of applying the Truck and Van Hand Brakes, the train must be held stationary by an application of the Automatic Air Brake and the Driver’s Brake valve must be placed in the Lap Position. The Fireman is to remain on the Engine and the Driver must release the brake on the trucks on which the Hand brakes are to be applied. When the Air Brake is fully released on the respective trucks, he must apply the Hand Brakes firmly, but not heavily, in accordance with the above table.
  Before restarting from the locations where the application of the Van brake is required, the Driver must intimate to the Guard that the Van Brake is to be applied by giving a succession of short, sharp whistles; on receipt of such intimation the Guard must then apply the Van Brake.

By mid 1927 traffic on the line was mostly sawn timber, with single wagons delivered empty to three or four sidings along the line each trip and collected on the return, plus a wagon-load of limestone at White Rock Lime Siding. The station received brown coal briquettes to fire the lime kilns, and the product was then forwarded to Queensland for the sugar refining process. Plenty of timber traffic had previously been collected from Erica, but this had recently been shifted to Collins Siding and its connection to the tramway.

Few passengers travelled on the line on a regular basis. Some people purchased special Excursion tickets from late Spring through early Autumn, which included one-way rail travel from Moe to Walhalla, then a hike across to Warburton railway station and a train for the end of the trip, or vice versa. Parcels from various businesses in Walhalla were delivered along the line at random locations, not just stations, and collected after the fact. However, the line became quite busy during the Christmas season, with maximum-length trains ("about 12 trucks") temporarily converted for passenger accommodation.

Through the 1920s the Victorian Railways made attempts to market the Walhalla line as a tourist attraction. In the first year of operations 13,000 passengers were carried (the sum of tourist and regular passengers), but this had fallen to 11,000 by 1925 and 2,500 in 1939. The Mixed trains to Walhalla were supplemented by Erica goods trips, loading potatoes at Gould and Moondarra and timber at Erica and Collins' Siding. Occasionally the load would be too great for the locomotive to handle, so a truck of timber deemed less urgent would be detached and replaced with a load of potatoes.

In January 1929 Mixed train departures from Moe were scheduled to connect with the 11:15 am arrival from Melbourne, which on Wednesdays and Saturdays departed Flinders Street railway station at 7:55 am, and on Mondays and Fridays at 8:36 am.

The December 1929 timetable was slightly simpler than the earlier version, with the Friday goods train promoted to a Mixed service and some of the other trip times altered:

Train	From	Departs	To	Arrives	Type	Days	Notes
1‡	Moe	5:30 am	O’Shea & Bennett’s Siding	8:20 am	Goods	As required	May terminate Erica (7:40 am) if arranged by S.M. Moe, and return as No.8 or No.16. Cross No.2 at Erica.
3‡	Moe	10:00 am	Platina	1:00 pm	Goods	As required	3 or 5, not both
5‡	Moe	10:45 am	O’Shea & Bennett’s Siding	1:10 pm	Goods	As required	3 or 5, not both
7	Moe	12 noon	Walhalla	3:20 pm	Mixed	Mon, Wed, Fri, Sat	Cross 12 and 14 at Erica.
9	Moe	12 noon	Walhalla	3 pm	Tricycle	Tue, Thu	9 or 11, not both. Cross 12 and 14 at Erica.
11‡	Moe	12 noon	Walhalla	3:20 pm	Goods	Tue, Thu	9 or 11, not both. Cross 12 and 14 at Erica.
13‡	Moe	2:00 pm	Erica	4:05 pm	Goods	As required	
2	Walhalla	6:30 am	Moe	9:40 am	Mixed	Mon, Wed, Fri, Sat	Cross No.1 at Erica
4	Walhalla	6:30 am	Moe	9:25 am	Tricycle	Tue, Thu	4 or 6, not both
6‡	Walhalla	6:30 am	Moe	9:40 am	Goods	Tue, Thu	4 or 6, not both
8‡	Erica	8:45 am	Moe	11:00 am	Goods	As required	8 or 10, not both
10	O’Shea & Bennett’s Siding	8:45 am	Moe	11:45 am	Goods	As required	8 or 10, not both
12	Platina	1:15 pm	Moe	4:30 pm	Goods	As required	12 or 14, not both. Cross 7, 9 and 11 at Erica.
14	O’Shea & Bennett’s Siding	1:30 am	Moe	4:30 pm	Goods	As required	12 or 14, not both. Cross 7, 9 and 11 at Erica.
16	Erica	4:35 am	Moe	7:15 pm	Goods	As required	
Notes: ‡ is for Conditional trains, only operated if organised in advance. Gould may open as a Temporary Staff and Ticket station when required and published, or as a Telephone Block Post.

It is not known how often any of the conditional services operated. At this time the Walhalla line was at its peak allocated motive power, with engines 3A, 6A (until January 1929), 9A, 10A (replacing 7A, with a gap 7 September to 31 October 1929) and G42 all allocated.

=== 1930s service ===
Easter 1931 saw services briefly boosted, with one Mixed train each way leaving Walhalla 6:30 am and returning at 3:20 pm every day on 2-4, 6 and 8–11 April inclusive, though the return train was to be held at Moe and run later on days when special service G7 (8:38 am from Flinders Street) operated. No train was scheduled for Sunday 5 April, and postal motors were cancelled on those days. An additional train was to run on Tuesday 7 April, departing from Walhalla at 4 pm, arriving Moe 6:25 pm and connecting with Melbourne-bound train G16, then returning to Walhalla "as arranged by S.M., Moe". To provide extra capacity, three goods wagons were fitted with canopies, cushions, ladders and lights to act as additional passenger cars, one of which was to be kept at Walhalla to be attached to ordinary trains if required.

A circular issued later in 1931 saw the entire line's operations flipped around. The Walhalla locomotive and crew were relocated to Moe on a permanent basis, with trains now originating and terminating there instead of running from then returning to Walhalla. The Mixed train was made to run Wednesday and Saturday afternoons, returning later the same day, with the postal service to a similar timetable on Mondays and Thursdays. There was no service on Tuesday or Friday, and all the conditional schedules were deleted. The trains were numbers 1 and 2, and mail trolleys 3 and 4 for down and up trips respectively. Special instructions for working at Erica were issued in Weekly Notice No.16 of 1931, around the third or fourth week of April. The normal rules for shunting at intermediate sidings, requiring securing of wagons before detaching the engine, still applied.

On Thursday 8 September 1932 additional trains were required, operating as the 10:35am from Moe and 2:35pm from Walhalla. To accommodate this, the Postal Motor driver had to be specially instructed to follow no earlier than a proscribed time interval.

In November 1932 a Mixed train was added on Monday, using the same schedule as far as Erica, connecting with a postal motor there. In 1933 the Monday train turned around at Erica, while the Wednesday and Saturday services continued to Walhalla arriving at 2:40pm and departing 3:10pm, passing Erica at 4:25pm and arriving back at Moe at 6:15pm. A postal motor operated on Thursdays and connected with the Erica mixed train on Mondays.

September 1933 saw the visit of the Railway Commissioners, including Harold Winthrop Clapp, to the line. On that visit a local resident who had been cutting telegraph poles for export to Melbourne, and he explained to Clapp that because the poles were so long they had to be loaded in pairs across three trucks rather than into singles, making the cost of transit 50% higher than he felt fair. Clapp responded, "This is something that hasn't been thought of in drafting railway regulations because we have so few narrow gauge lines. Now we know, we'll look at the matter." Thereafter, the regulations changed and clients were no longer charged for use of spacer trucks between long loads.

By 1935 services had increased again. The Monday Mixed and Wednesday Goods services ran to Erica meeting a mail service, while the Tuesday and Friday trains ran to Walhalla one day and returned the next morning. There was also a Saturday return service. The December 1935 timetable shows a slight variation on that, with the Mixed train to Erica Monday and Saturday meeting a mail trolley to Walahalla, or a full-length Mixed train to Walhalla Tuesday and Friday returning the following morning, with a goods train to Walhalla on Wednesdays and no Thursday service. As such, on Wednesday and Saturday each week there were two Up trains scheduled, in lieu of Tuesday and Friday services respectively.

In May 1936 the Goods train was moved to Thursdays, with a mail service running the full length of the line on Wednesdays in lieu, and the timetable had an optional goods train scheduled, if required, from Moe to the O'Shea and Bennett's Siding.

In 1937 Mr Collis of Fullwood Siding requested that the Walahlla train depart earlier than 7am, in order to give sufficient time to shunt his siding while still meeting the through train from Moe to Melbourne at 9:50am. The request was rejected on the grounds that trains were often fully loaded by the time they arrived at Fullwood siding, and this was the reason they often did not pick up his wagons for despatch; an earlier departure time would not resolve the issue. The compromise suggestion was that more trains than the four regular weekly trips (2:40 pm Mondays, Wednesdays and Saturdays; and 3:30 pm Thursdays) would be instructed to stop at Fullwoods to collect loading, if they had capacity and time available.

In 1939 the Thursday Walhalla Goods service was trimmed back to Platina and connected with a mail tricycle there, but an extra early-morning conditional train was added to the schedule on Monday, Tuesday, Thursday and Friday, and one in the afternoon on Wednesday. Additionally, there was provision for the Monday and Sunday Mixed trains to be extended from Erica as far as the O'Shea and Bennett's Siding.

=== Double-headed trains ===
Double-headed narrow gauge trains had been theoretically possible from 1926, when the delivery of the Garratt engines forced a fleetwide conversion to stronger automatic M.C.B. couplers in lieu of chopper couplers. A trial was run in 1937 on the Walhalla line with the steel cowcatchers temporarily removed for clearance between the engines; this test included checking the ability of the locomotive compressors to correctly operate the Westinghouse air brake systems. When this trial was deemed successful double-heading was permitted as a rule, though initially restricted to engines 9A, 12A and 17A until the other engines were modified. Engine 9A was noted as having an extended air reservoir shortly thereafter.

Special instructions were issued to enginemen (drivers and firemen) of double-headed trains; the following excerpt is dated 1943.

CONTROLLING TRAINS HAULED BY TWO "NA" LOCOMOTIVES

1. To provide for efficient brake control and also to prevent over-heating or skidding of the tyers, the following instructions must be strictly ovserved by the train crew on Passenger, Mixed, and Goods trains:-
  1. The brakes of the complete train must be examined and tested at Erica prior to departure on the Down journey, and at Erica and Collins Siding prior to departure on the Up journey.
  2. Hand Brakes are to be applied on Cars in the case of Passenger trians, and on loaded "N.Q.R". trucks on Mixed and Goods trains, and must be in operation asd set out in the following table:

Down Trains	Gross Load in Tons	Car or Truck Brakes to be applied firmly	Up Trains	Gross Load in Tons	Car or Truck Brakes to be applied firmly
Top of Grade near Mileage 100 miles to Thomson	90 to 110	2	Erica to Collins' Siding	90 to 110	-
Top of Grade near Mileage 100 miles to Thomson	110 to 160	4	Erica to Collins' Siding	111 to 150	-
			Erica to Collins' Siding	151 to 220	2
			94½ miles to Gould	90 to 110	2
			94½ miles to Gould	111 to 150	4
			94½ miles to Gould	151 to 220	7
			89 Mile Brake Board to Mielage 86	90 to 110	1
			89 Mile Brake Board to Mielage 86	111 to 150	3
			89 Mile Brake Board to Mielage 86	151 to 220	5

2. When the train has been stopped at the locations set out above, for the purpose of applying the Car or Truck Hand Brakes, the train must be held stationary by an application of the Automatic Air Brake and the Driver’s Brake valve must be placed in the Lap Position. The Fireman of the leading engine is to remain on the engine and the Driver must release the brake on the trucks on which the Hand brakes are to be applied. When the Air Brake is fully released on the respective trucks, he must apply the Hand Brakes firmly, but not heavily, in accordance with the above table. When on falling grades the Driver requires the assistance of the Guard’s hand brake, he will this fact to the Guard by giving a succession of short, sharp whistles.
3. The double heading of "NA" Locomotives must be confined to the locomotives specially equipped for this purpose. The locomotives so equipped are Nos. 9, 12, and 17. (Note: Engines 9A, 12A, 17A and G42 were the allocated motive power on the Walhalla line from March 1939 (after 15A departed), but 5A joined the fleet in March 1943 and 12A left in May the same year. Engines 11A and 13A had been modified in 1938 for double-headed running, followed by 8A in 1945; though other engines including the three at Moe known to be so modified do not have appropriate entries recorded.)

=== Back to Walhalla and other specials ===
A special excursion train operated on 31 January 1938 for the Australia Day holiday, hauling perhaps the longest and most crowded passenger train in the line's history, with 885 passengers. Previous passenger trains on the line had been restricted to no more than 600 passengers. The excursion was organised by Walhalla local Charles Lee, with a return fare from Melbourne of £-/11/6. The load included three compartment NB passenger cars, twelve NQR trucks converted for temporary passenger accommodation, and one NBC van for a total of 175 long tons (178 t; 196 short tons); well above the load limit for double-headed NA locomotives and rapidly approaching the theoretical limit for three engines. The train was operated by 9A (leading) and 17A, and was long enough that before departure the leading engine was parked just short of the George Street level crossing at Moe. Several goods trains previously had been double-headed to Erica, but this was the first time two engines worked together as far as Walhalla. At the time the Garratt locomotive had been sent to Newport Workshops for maintenance, and so was unavailable to work the special train. Lewis recounts that the train was significantly overcrowded (photos show about ten passengers sitting on the roofs of various cars), but that there was no other solution because the line only had one more NB and NC carriage, and these were required for the regular train later the same day.

On arrival at Gould engine 17A was topped up with water first, then the train was rolled back slightly downhill to refill 9A's tanks. During the time the regular mail trolley service from Whitfield was held in the Loop track. The train spent fifteen minutes at Gould and had a few false starts to make departure 18 minutes late, and another ten were spent at Erica. The train paused briefly at White Rock Lime Siding (Note: The original at O'Shea's Siding, not the later site at Platina.) and had to stop at Thomson to allow some passengers to disembark; the train had been coming down the slope and reportedly stopped with the lead engine on the bridge. Final arrival at Walhalla was 65 minutes behind schedule, at 1:35pm. This late arrival caused the following regular passenger train (15A, with one compartment NB and one NC) to wait at Erica, and so that service didn't reach Walhalla until 3:50pm (over an hour late). A further consequence of the late running was insufficient time for the regular train to return with its engine, so locomotive 17A was substituted on the normal train and 15A left for the return special, still with its cowcatchers attached.

The special train left Walhalla at 5:32pm with 15A leading and 9A trailing, hauling the re-marshalled consist of the 12 NQ trucks (one with the something like "Fourth Class Air Conditioned" scratched into the paintwork), three NB carriages and NBC van. The train arrived back at Moe at 8:25pm, 38 minutes late, and connected with a special broad gauge passenger train departing at 8:50pm to return to Melbourne.

After this event, over-length trains continued to operate as required. For example, in January 1940 two consecutive days saw special trains to Walhalla, the first on Sunday 28 and the second on Monday 29 January. The Sunday train was part of a Traralgon "cheap Sunday trip" organised for the Victorian Railways Institute, with a broad gauge train running empty from Traralgon to Maffra, picking up there at 6:45 am and all stations back to Morwell, then passengers transferred to the narrow gauge train at Moe, departing at 8:55 am. This train ran to Walhalla, arriving 11:25 am, then departed 5:30 pm and met the broad gauge train at Moe that would then return to Maffra at 10:05 pm and finish by running empty back to Traralgon. On the following day a broad gauge service of "say 7 BPL cars" ran from Flinders Street railway station departing Melbourne 6:55 am, picking up at Caulfield, Dandenong, Nar Nar Goon and Warragul, the latter with a 20 minute refreshment stop. This train met the same narrow gauge train at Moe, arriving Walhalla 12:15 pm. The return trip left Walhalla at 5:25 pm and, with interchange at Moe and stopping at Darnum (but not at the platform), Warragul again with refreshments, Dandenong (but not Nar Nar Goon), Oakleigh, Caulfield, South Yarra and Richmond before finally terminating at 10:55 pm that evening. For this two-day event the narrow gauge train was restricted to 500 passengers (including 20 each from Warragul and Moe), and the consist was composed of "say 3 NB cars and 12 seated trucks" plus the van. 72 cushions and 12 stepladders for the trucks were supplied from the Melbourne area, pre-positioned in days prior, and the Stationmaster at Moe was specifically instructed to light the lamps in the Monday night return broad gauge train, which absolutely had to run to time through Warragul to avoid delaying normal services.

The final "Back to Walhalla" special operated on 27 January 1941. Another Melbourne-Walhalla excursion service was operated for the Walhallaites Association on Tuesday 4 November, with intermediate stops both ways at Caulfield, Oakleigh, Dandenong, Pakenham and Warragul.

=== Services during World War II ===
By 1939 the regular schedule had been altered again, to:

- A mixed train from Moe to Erica and return on Mondays and Saturdays, meeting a parcels tricycle at Erica which completed the run to Walhalla while the Erica train shunted;
- A Mixed train that from Moe to Walhalla on Tuesday and Friday afternoons, returning from Walhalla on Wednesday and Saturday mornings respectively;
- A Goods train from Moe to Platina and back on Thursdays, meeting a parcels tricycle that ran Erica to Walhalla and return; and
- A Parcels trolley to fill in the gaps, running from Moe to Walhalla and return on Wednesday afternoon, though this service could run later if additional goods trains were operating, to provide connections between Erica and O'Shea and Bennett's Siding.

This service required one train based at Moe (running to Erica on Monday, Walhalla Tuesday-Wednesday, Platina Thursday, Walhalla one-way on Friday, then Walhalla-Moe-Erica-Moe on Saturday), plus a postal tricycle from Moe for the Wednesday return trip, and another at Erica for the Monday, Wednesday and Thursday return trips to Walhalla. Trains that stayed overnight at Walhalla were rest jobs for crews, who would work the train in both directions and sleep in a small shelter on the Walhalla platform overnight. The line was also at constant risk of rockfalls, landslips and landslides. Like some of the other narrow gauge lines by this stage, stops en route were made by community request rather than any official timetable. An example given in Rails to Old Walhalla (2011) was that the Moe butcher owned a farm about two miles from Moondarra that faced onto the railway; he had cut a hole in the fence and cattle was loaded and unloaded there, instead of at the station.

On 9 September 1939, mere days after World War II had started, the Railways proposed an alternate schedule for the Walhalla line with 3 Mixed and 1 Goods train per week between Moe and Erica, three Goods trains from Erica to Platina and only one of those extending to Walhalla, with no passenger accommodation beyond Erica. In practice the December 1939 timetable showed Mixed trains to Erica on Monday and Saturday returning the same day, and to Walhalla on Tuesday and Friday returning the following day, plus postal motors and assorted conditional and regular goods trains. A new addition was the optional 5 am goods from Moe, which turned around at O'Shea and Bennett's Siding to return by 9:55 am.

During the war the timetable was vastly simplified, reduced to a three-weekly Mixed as far as Erica with only the Wednesday train extended to Walhalla, returning on the Thursday. The Monday and Friday Mixed trains could be extended to Platina if required, and conditional goods trains were permitted on Tuesday and Saturday from Moe to Platina as well.

The NA class locomotives had small fireboxes that required high calorific content fuel, e.g. that from Maitland, New South Wales. But during the war shortages had driven the Victorian Railways to import lower-quality coal from India. A double-headed train from Moe to Erica was to use this coal as a trial, so the engine crews cleared out the Maitland coal and filled up the bunkers with what they called "Gandhi Poop". The train left Moe on time, but ran out of steam two miles away at the 1 in 30 slope following the Latrobe River bridge, and neither engine could build up sufficient steam without needing the injectors on (lowering the temperature of the boiler) or having to clear the ash and clinker from the firebox grates, during which time any steam built up would be lost. The train ended up having to set back to Moe, swap the coal for the better quality Maitland supply and try the trip again, with the whole ordeal taking fifteen hours for the 37 miles (60 kilometres) round trip. Another time engine G42 slipped badly just outside Platina and bent a coupling rod, rendering the engine completely disabled. The crew ended up having to drop the fire on the track and walk back to Erica to get a taxi home, while fitters rescued the engine the following day.

The Federal Government invested in bridge repairs on the line during the second world war, because its isolated location in hilly terrain with extensive abandoned mines was judged a good place to store weapons, munitions and documentation.

The April 1943 timetable had Mixed trains from Moe to Erica on Monday, Wednesday and Friday. The Wednesday trip continuing to Walhalla and returning on Thursday, while the Monday and Friday trips could extend to Platina as goods trains if required. There were also conditional goods trains on Tuesday and Saturday mornings to Platina; the mail tricycle services had been withdrawn in 1940. In September 1943 the conditional trains were deleted from the schedule due to a coal shortage.

The last train from Walhalla was hauled by G42 on 31 March 1944, and the line between Platina and Walhalla was closed the following day. The Mixed trains then ran every Monday, Wednesday and Friday from Moe to Erica and return, with trips between Erica, O'Shea and Bennett's Siding and Platina made as required.

=== Post-war ===
Although Moe was provided with a gantry crane in 1946 for goods transfer between the gauges, not much changed for the branch line traffic. The cost of this facility was shared, half each being provided by the Victorian Railways and the Australian Paper Manufacturers Ltd. The service was a Monday Mixed from Moe to Erica just before midday, and a Wednesday and Friday Goods service leaving slightly earlier. Each of these trains ran to Erica and returned the same afternoon, with an option to extend the goods trains to Platina.

A petition was forwarded to the Victorian Railways Commissioners in August 1947 to change the schedule from Monday to Wednesday and, if possible, Friday services, signed by fifteen business owners on the line.

In 1948 the service was changed to an 11 am Goods departure from Moe to either Erica under normal circumstances or Platina if required on Wednesdays and Fridays only; if Erica it would return at 4:50 pm, otherwise 6:25 pm. Mixed trains returned for Christmas 1948, with an 11:55 am service from Moe to Erica and return at 5:45 pm only on 20 and 27 December, and 3 and 10 January 1949. In February 1949 the offering was an 11:40 am Mixed on Mondays to Erica, becoming a Goods to Platina if required and returning at 5:55 pm to Moe, plus a Wednesday and Friday goods trains that could go to Erica or to Platina if required with alternate return schedules similar to above. By this date a coordinated road motor (bus) service between Walhalla and Moe was provided.

The Mixed train was donwgraded to a "Car Goods" service from 1 September 1950, meaning passengers if any were expected to ride in the guard's van; and separate passenger accommodation was entirely withdrawn on 12 January 1951 with only a single goods trian to Platina every Friday. The line between Erica and Platina was closed in October 1952 and the Friday goods train truncated, then changed to Thursdays from 14 May 1953.

Across both gauges and the Walhalla, Yallourn, Thorpdale and Gippsland lines, Moe station had 19 drivers, 19 firemen, two coalers and two engine cleaners rostered in 1952. Most of the coal available at the time was from Wonthaggi State Mine, which didn't work for the NA class engines so a small supply of Maitland coal was maintained. The narrow gauge engines would be prepared by the depot crew, then the rostered driver and fireman would take over shortly before departure. Traffic at the time was mostly briquette deliveries outbound, timber from Erica and potatoes from Erica, Moondarra and Gould inbound, plus a truck of lime from Platina. There was no timber loading from Collins Siding by this point.

In 1952 the total tonnage conveyed by the line, in both directions, was only 9,409 long tons (9,560 t).

The service then remained on the twice-weekly schedule until the line closed completely in the middle of 1954.

=== Example trip, March 1954 ===
One of the last trains on the line, the Erica Mixed of 18 March 1954 worked by engine G42, was photographed extensively by Ted Downs. On this trip, the consist from Moe was the engine, louvre van 6NU, an unidentified, tarped NQ open truck, and guard's van 7NBC. The train left Moe with the photographer and "two or three" other passengers. The train made good time to the water tanks at Gould.

On arrival at Erica the two trucks were detached to be unloaded by local residents. The NQ placed beyond Down of the goods shed on No.3 track while the NU was coupled to a set of five other NQ wagons already present at the up end of the same track, with the consignments collected directly from the van by local road trucks. Van 7NBC was left opposite the station building. Station facilities were the main building, a standard Victorian Railways portable timber structure with a verandah and fireplace, and two galvanised iron toilet facilities; the Men's being a distance away from the station building while the Ladies' was attached to the main structure. A water tower was present at each end of the station. The Men's toilet had an advertisement board for "Pure Velvet Soap" below the station nameboard and elevation board.

The line beyond Erica was clear of weeds only far enough to enable shunting of the yard, and the arrival Home signal from Platina and Walhalla had been left at proceed, with the operating lever adjacent to the Men's toilet. (Note: This signal would have detected the arrival points' position, so with the main station lever reverse the signal would show proceed when the mainline track was set, or stop when the points at the Down end were reversed.) The derailment protection at the down end of the yard was connected by point rodding to the lever of the mainline turnout, with both No.2 and No.3 tracks derails worked synchronously.

Erica had two Departmental Residences in place at this time, and at the down end of the station a collection of discarded and abandoned timber tramway equipment including bogies, winches, a TACL rail tractor and the Climax Locomotive of the Tyers Valley tramway. A second T.A.C.L. was still in use at the Erica sawmill, shunting about ten discarded former Victorian Railways NQ wagons between the three sidings; some of these were singles, others worked in pairs with the facing sets of truck ends removed. Notably, while the rails in the sawmill area "appear[s] to be of V.R. origin", one of the turnouts was worked by a point lever apparently imported from the North East Dundas Tramway line in Tasmania. That line's last regular service was in 1929, and it had used the world's first Garratt locomotives.

At the Up end of Erica the stock race structure was immediately adjacent to the toe of the Up end turnout, so livestock wagons would have been loaded and unloaded on the mainline. Like the Down end, the mainline turnout point lever also worked the derail in No.2 road, though the Up end of No.3 road had a timber, manually-worked scotch block.

The return train from Erica was the locomotive, newly-emptied 6NU, untarped truck 166NQ collected from Erica and van 6NBC. At Gould a crate was loaded into the NQ. On arrival at Moe G42 was stabled adjacent to broad gauge N493 in the locomotive shed, while 7A was parallel outside and 12A was stabled in the yard. The parallel broad gauge siding near the turntable was host to the early, timber-bodied rail tractor 1RT, and workmen's sleeper 50X, so any load transfer between the two gauges must have happened at the transfer sidings and gantry crane at the opposite end of the station. Narrow gauge wagons 1NQ and 85NQ were present in the yard on the maintenance trestle, accompanied by a handful of other NQ wagons and an NC van. There was also another NQ stabled at the west end of the yard near the goods shed, fitted with a 2,000 imp gal (9,100 L) water tank, and one final wagon in the transfer sidings.

== Closure and legacy ==
The Walhalla line, like the other narrow gauge routes, was never profitable. In the period 1918 to 1929 it made £150,650 in revenue, but still generated a £76,600 loss. 1929 was the line's best-performing year, with the loss reduced to only £3,424. The total patronage from opening to closing, excluding the years of World War II where figures were not kept, was 421,534 outwards passengers; 16,587,901 LT (16,854,086 t) outwards and 280,143 LT (284,638 t) inwards goods (total 16,868,044 LT (17,138,724 t)), and total revenue unadjusted for inflation was £1,122,306/2/10.

Early traffic on the line included residents of Walhalla moving out, sometimes taking their disassembled houses with them. Some of those houses were later rebuilt in Moe, and were still extant as of 1954.

Trains ceased operating between Platina and Walhalla on 1 April 1944; from that date the regular tri-weekly Mixed train ran to Erica, or Platina if required. Later this service was reduced to Mondays only, though it changed to Fridays only in January 1951. At this time the train was reclassed as a regular Goods train, though an NBC van with passenger accommodation was available for travel. In 1952 the Erica-Platina section was closed, and the whole of the line on 25 June 1954.

By the 1950s the track, rolling stock, crews and residents were generally run down; Anchen (2012) recounts from the Narracan Shire Advocate in February 1954 that of a consignment of 16 LT (16 t) of fertiliser from Melbourne to Erica, only a quarter of the load actually arrived with the rest being lost to weather, and some of the truck being unloaded at Gould to be forwarded the following week. Another resident noted that the railway did not have sufficient livestock trucks or loading facilities so there was no choice but to use road transport. Furthermore, cancellation of the early morning train from Erica to Moe meant there was no way to provide same-day delivery of livestock to Traralgon market.

The last train to Erica was worked by driver Con Mangan and fireman Jim Rae, with engine 7A on 25 June 1954. It was supposed to be worked the previous day by G42, but the engine couldn't function because coal had been put on the lighting-up fire too early and suffocated it. For the final train 7A was decorated with a banner, ferns, flags and chalk, and made the return trip with some difficulty due to things like the sanders not functioning correctly. The train was met at Erica by a small crowd, then returned to Moe well after dark. The consist had been the engine, a louvre NU van, an open NQ truck, and guard's van 7NBC. The NQ truck was delivered to Moondarra and loaded with potatoes to be collected on the return trip. Additional wagons were collected "at every station along the line", reaching and possibly breaching the maximum limit that the engine could haul with the result that six wagons had to be left behind at Gould.

Finally, on 29 June 7A was lit up again for driver Con Mangan and fireman Frank Ritchie to run to Gould with van 7NBC and collect the last six NQ wagons from the siding there. The engines and rolling stock sat at Moe for some time after closure before being removed; in October 1954 G42 was taken to Newport Workshops (the engine units on transfer wagon 129Q, the boiler unit loaded on a QB or QBF well wagon), and engine 7A arrived at Upper Ferntree Gully in to work trains for the newly established Puffing Billy Preservation Society.

On 9 September 1954 six NQ wagons, nos 94, 100, 102, 153, 169 and 208, were sold from Moe station to the Forests Commission. In 1957 NQ trucks 29, 94, 153, 164 and 169 were recorded in use at the Erica sawmill, being shunted by one of the Forestry Commission's TACL units.

After the line closed, lyrebirds in the forest were noted in continuing to imitate the locomotive whistles with a ghostly reverberation.

Occasionally from 1956 to 1958, locals would ride home-made trolleys along the remaining track, but this practice ceased when after track dismantling started in 1958. In 1958 the Moe engine shed was dismantled and van 6NU was mounted on trestles with the bogies and rails removed under it; most of the stations along the line had their staff locks and other signalling equipment removed, buildings demolished, and sidings at Knotts, White Rock and Platina had all been lifted, with dismantling of Walhalla yard underway. By 1963 parts various bridge decks had fallen through, and the Thomson River bridge had been sold to the Shire of Narracan (who were also negotiating to buy the rest of the bridges along Stringers Creek). The Coopers Creek bridge was sold to the army for a demolition exercise and the road bridge over the line nearby had been filled in underneath. At Walhalla the main road had been diverted over the site of the former station building, and similarly the road between Moe and Erica had been diverted onto the rail alignment in places to make way for Moondarra Dam.

Removal of track and buildings was completed by 1963, and since then changes to Moe yard (including electrification, and later de-electrification) have obliterated nearly all evidence of the former interchange facilities; as of 2011 a single gate post was still in situ at the former George Street level crossing (visible on Google Street View in 2010, but absent by 2014), and the "telltale line of back fences" indicate where the line used to pass through. Just north of town the rail formation has been converted to an access road for a sewage plant. Parts of the land have been sold privately, including the area where remains of the Latrobe River bridge sit, but the Tanjil River bridge is still somewhat intact, as is the road bridge over the line on the approach to Gooding. The area of the Tyers River bridge was flooded by rising waters in Moondarra Dam and Reservoir (completed in 1961), though some parts are visible in low water conditions.

The Thomson River Railway Bridge is listed on the Register of the National Estate. It had been scheduled for demolition as a military exercise in the 1950s but this was prevented by "indignant railway enthusiasts", and was still intact (though with gaps in the deck) in 1992, and in the preservation era trains operate over it again.

== Reconstruction ==
In recognition of the outstanding tourist potential of the railway, a number of attempts were made to reopen the line for tourist traffic, but none were successful until the early 1990s. The Walhalla Railway Taskforce was formed in 1991, becoming the Walhalla Goldfields Railway, Inc., in 1993. By this time the roadbed was a totally overgrown jungle of blackberries and heavy scrub, with numerous sections of the trackbed having collapsed and all being derelict except one of the bridges. Restoration began with the establishment of Thomson Station and its accompanying yard on the site of an original station. The railway commenced operations in April 1994, within the Thomson Station yard. Gradually the line extended, first over the nationally heritage-classified Thomson River Bridge in October 1994, pushing up the Stringers Creek Gorge to Happy Creek. This became the terminus for the line until the six bridges in the last kilometre into the Walhalla Station yard were completed, this section of line opening on 15 March 2002. The operating line is 2.5 mi (4.0 km) in length.

The new Walhalla station building is a replica of the original, though on the opposite side of the yard because the road alignment has taken over its former site.

== See also ==
- Narrow gauge lines of the Victorian Railways

== See also ==
- Narrow gauge lines of the Victorian Railways
- Walhalla Goldfields Railway
- List of closed regional railway stations in Victoria
- List of closed regional railway lines in Victoria
- Transportation in Australia
- Tyers Valley Tramway
