= Walhalla Goldfields Rail Trail =

Rail trail in Victoria, Australia

Coordinates: 37°58′19″S 146°24′42″E

The Walhalla Goldfields Rail Easement is a 7.7 kilometre trail which follows the former route of the narrow gauge Walhalla railway line between Erica and Thomson station, near Walhalla in Victoria's east. Another small section of the former line, which runs through Moondarra State Park between Moe and Erica, also opens as the unofficial Moondarra Rail Trail.

The original railway line from Moe to Walhalla was closed in sections between 1944 and 1954, although the section from Thomson to Walhalla has been rebuilt as the Walhalla Goldfields Railway.

The surface is compacted earth. It has been described as "rough, steep and inadequately signposted". It features tall forests and views of the Thomson River. The trail features side paths to the Horseshoe Bend tunnel, and to the small town of Coopers Creek, as well as connections to the Australian Alps Walking Track.

The Walhalla Goldfields Railway's long-term plans intend for the route of the rail trail to become an extension of the tourist railway to Erica.

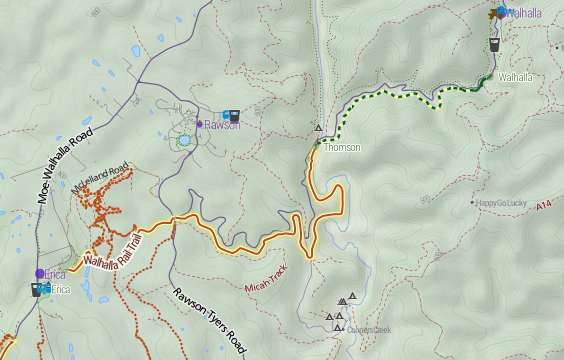
Map of the rail trail.

== See also ==
- List of rail trails
