= Thomson River Diversion Tunnel =

- IUCN category VI (protected area with sustainable use of natural resources)
- Location within Victoria
- Location: Victoria
- Nearest city: Walhalla
- Coordinates: 37°58′20″S 146°25′29″E

The Thomson River Diversion Tunnel, also known as the Horseshoe Bend Tunnel or the Chinese Tunnel, is located on the Thomson River near the junction with Coopers Creek (and the locality of Platina), approximately 4 kilometres (2.5 mi) south-west of Walhalla, Victoria, Australia. The site is listed on the Victorian Heritage Register and covered by a Heritage Overlay.

== Location and features ==
The river flows around Stockriders Spur in a horseshoe bend. The tunnel was driven through the spur diverting the river and allowing the exposed river bed to be sluiced for alluvial gold.

The Thomson River Alluvial Gold and Tailings Recovery Company began construction of the tunnel in August 1911 and the tunnel was completed circa October 1912. The total length of the tunnel is about 220 metres (720 ft). The tunnel is one of around thirteen river diversions surviving from the Victorian gold rush.

The West Gippsland Catchment Management Authority believe that the tunnel may have interrupted the migration path of threatened native fish such as the Australian grayling. They are considering diverting the river back to its original course. This proposal is meeting some opposition.
