= Darnum railway station =

Former railway station in Victoria, Australia

Darnum

General information
- Location: Australia
- Line: Orbost

Other information
- Status: Closed

History
- Opened: February 1880
- Closed: September 1983

Darnum railway station was a railway station on the Orbost railway line. It was opened in February 1880. Darnum was closed to passengers in October 1982, and was closed completely in September 1983.

The station was provided with a saleyard in 1910. In 1913, the station building was destroyed in a fire. Milk was loaded and shipped from the station to Flinders Street railway station every day.
