= Queensland Railways DH class =

Type of diesel-hydraulic locomotive

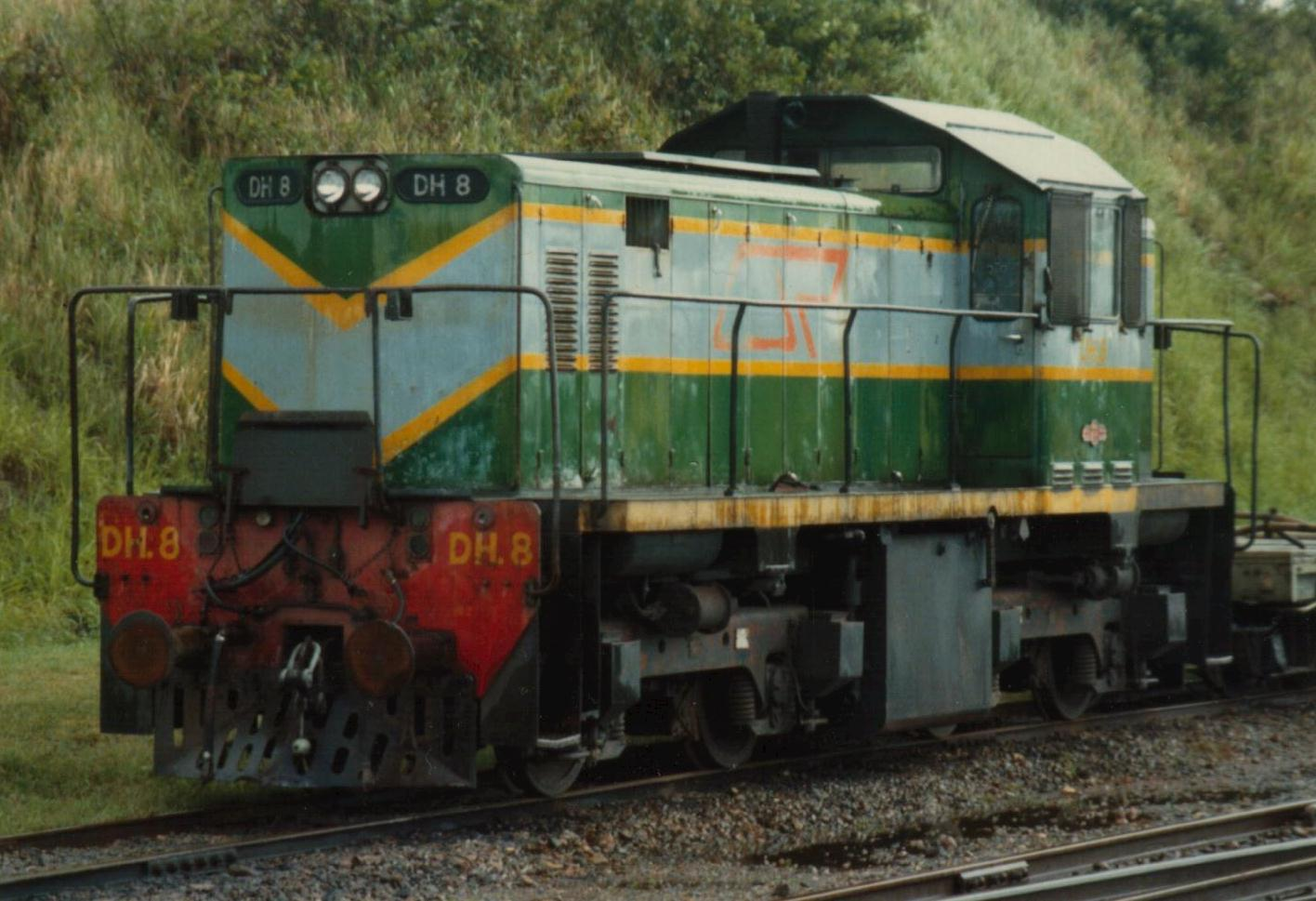
- DH8 at Innisfail in May 1986
Type and origin
- Power type: Diesel-hydraulic
- Builder: Walkers Limited, Maryborough
- Model: GH500
- Build date: 1966-1974
- Total produced: 73
Specifications
- Configuration
  - UIC: B′B′
  - Commonwealth: B-B
- Gauge: 3 ft 6 in (1,067 mm)
- Length: 12.65 m (41 ft 6 in)
- Loco weight: 37 t (36 long tons; 41 short tons)
- Fuel type: Diesel
- Prime mover: Caterpillar D355E
- Transmission: Voith L42U2
Performance figures
- Maximum speed: 50 km/h (31 mph)
- Power output: 347 kW (470 hp)
- Tractive effort: 114 kN (26,000 lbf)
Career
- Operators: Queensland Railways
- Number in class: 73
- Numbers: DH1-DH73
- First run: 1966
- Preserved: DH2, DH5, DH14, DH37, DH38, DH45, DH59, DH71, DH72, DH73
- Current owner: Vietnam Railways, Puffing Billy Railway, Walhalla Goldfields Railway

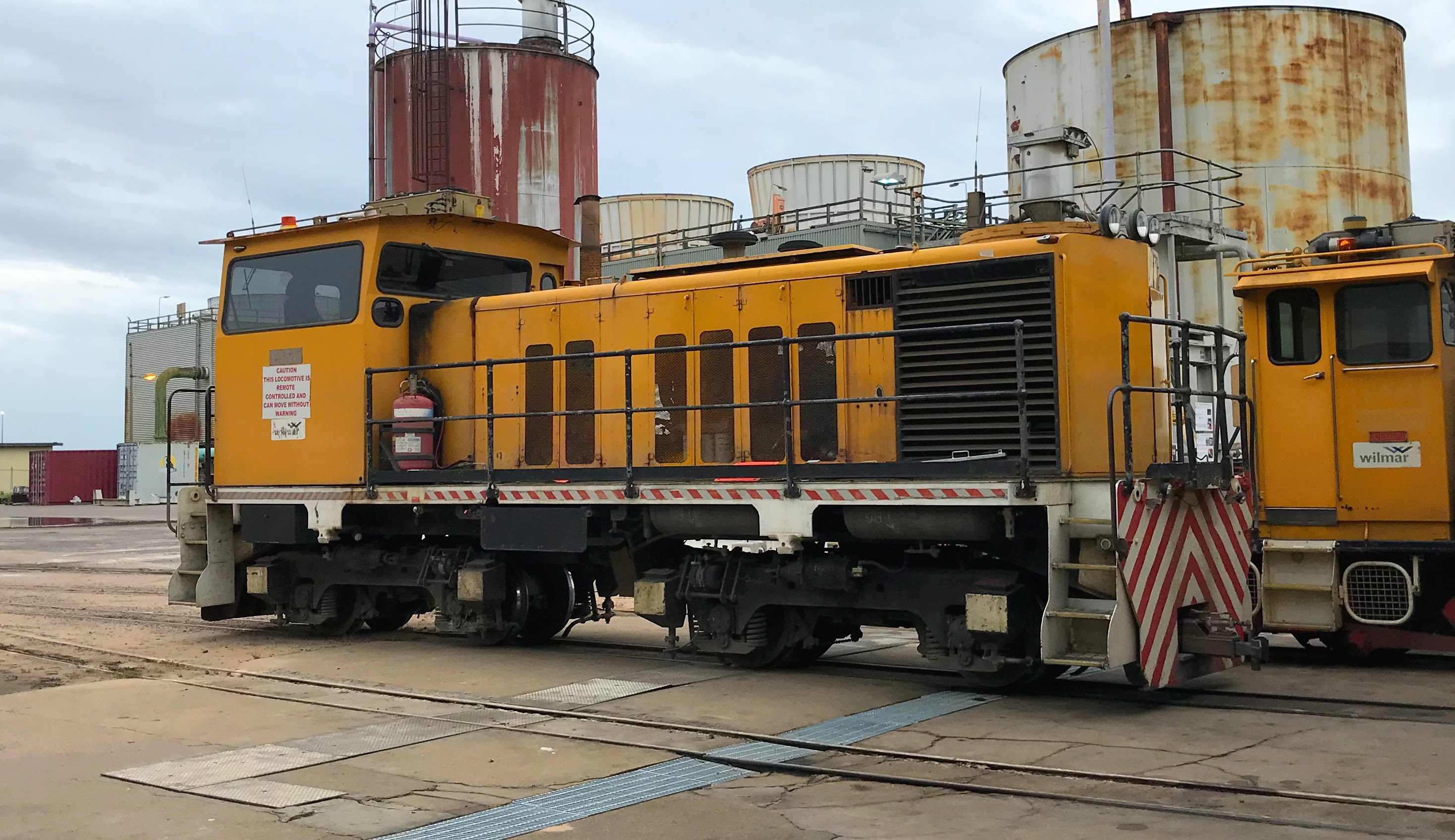
QR DH class locomotive converted to 2ft gauge for use on Queensland's sugar cane networks.

The DH class is a class of diesel-hydraulic locomotives built by Walkers Limited, Maryborough for Queensland Railways between 1966 and 1974.

== History ==
In 1966, Queensland Railways tested a Walkers Limited built diesel-hydraulic shunting locomotive. This was later purchased and by 1974, the 73 DH class locomotives had taken over shunting duties in most Queensland yards. They were also used on short-distance freight services. With the closure of many freight yards and the move to longer trains, withdrawals started in the 1980s. Many were sold for further use on Queensland sugar cane railways.

- 29 were rebuilt to 610 mm (2 ft) gauge for use at sugar mills around Queensland.
- 4 were rebuilt to 900 mm (2 ft 11 7/16 in) gauge for use on the Yallourn 900mm Railway in Victoria, and subsequently converted to 610 mm (2 ft) gauge for use at sugar mills in Queensland.
- 13 were exported to Vietnam and 2 to Malaysia as large diesel shunters for use on 1,000 mm (3 ft 3 3/8 in) gauge.

== Preservation ==
DH2 is retained by the Queensland Rail Heritage division. Privately owned DH71 is also on site.

DH14 was used at Old Ghan Heritage Railway and Museum, near Alice Springs, Northern Territory. Is stored due to trains not running. In preservation, it was painted in a variant of Australian National green and gold.

In 1995, DH59 was purchased by the Puffing Billy Railway, which operates in Victoria. It was re-gauged to 762 mm (2 ft 6 in), reclassified as Dh31 (stylised D^{H}31), and is used as a replacement for steam locomotives on days of total fire ban. It has since been joined by DH5. DH59 initially ran in its original QR livery (albeit debranded), however has since been repainted into Victorian Railways blue and gold.

As of 2017, Dh31 is currently re-numbered back to its original DH59.

In 2010, the Walhalla Goldfields Railway in Victoria purchased DH37. The locomotive is stored on a section of 1,067 mm (3 ft 6 in) track in the Walhalla yard, awaiting re-gauging to the Walhalla Railway's 762 mm (2 ft 6 in) gauge. In June 2012, the Walhalla Goldfields Railway also bought DH72, which will also be stored until funds are available to re-gauge it to 762 mm.

DH38 spent the majority of its working life in the Northern part of the state, especially around the Mackay area. Following a major failure – notably a large hole blown in the engine block following a crankcase explosion – the locomotive was withdrawn on 5 July 1991. After purchase by the ARHS Qld, DH38 underwent a major restoration involving rebuilding the engine and electrical system as well as having all axles and wheels replaced due to cracks.

DH41 was purchased by DownsSteam Toowoomba from Bundaberg Sugar in 2024 and is currently under restoration to mainline condition.

DH45 was purchased by the Southern Downs Steam Railway in 2019 & is used as a backup for SDSR's C17 steam locomotive.

DH71 has been purchased by DownsSteam Toowoomba as an addition to their diesel fleet. It currently resides undercover at the Ipswich Railway Workshops, awaiting transportation to their Drayton restoration base.

DH73 has been acquired by DownerEDi Marybrough to be used as a shunting locomotive. It is named Hugh Boge.

== Status table of preserved locomotives ==
Number	Name	In service	Withdrawn	Notes
DH2		1968-07-27	1991-04-03	Stored, Queensland Rail Heritage Division, dismantled, awaiting restoration at Workshops Rail Museum, North Ipswich
DH5		1968-08-27	1992-07-07	Operational, Re-gauged to 762 mm (2 ft 6 in), at Puffing Billy Railway, Victoria
DH14	Roger Vale	1968-11-18	1993-03-23	Stored, in good condition, at Old Ghan Heritage Railway and Museum, near Alice Springs, Northern Territory
DH37		1969-06-27	1994-02-14 (Moved into Departmental service as MMY037)	Stored, Awaiting re-gauging to 762 mm (2 ft 6 in), at Walhalla Goldfields Railway, Victoria
DH38		1969-07-07	1991-07-05	Operational at Kunkala, Rosewood Railway Museum
DH41		1969-08-XX		Under restoration by DownsSteam Tourist Railway & Museum at Drayton on the Darling Downs in Queensland. Purchased in full from Bundaberg Sugar by the DownsSteam Tourist Railway & Museum in September 2024.
DH45		1969-09-09	1994-02-14 (Moved into Departmental service as MMY045)	Operational, Privately owned, restored used at Mary Valley Rattler initially until 2012. In April 2013 two teenagers were accused of dishonestly gaining access to the locomotive and attempting to drive it on the railway. Since 2015 the owner has leased DH45 to Southern Downs Steam Railway.
DH59		1970-05-19	1991-05-20	Operational, Re-gauged to 762 mm (2 ft 6 in), at Puffing Billy Railway, Victoria
DH71		1973-12-07	1992-01-23	Stored, Purchased by DownsSteam Toowoomba for restoration to working condition, awaiting relocation from Workshops Rail Museum, North Ipswich
DH72		1974-01-15	Withdrawal date unknown	Stored, Awaiting re-gauging to 762 mm (2 ft 6 in), at Walhalla Goldfields Railway, Victoria
DH73	Hugh Boge	1974-02-07	Withdrawal date unknown, (Moved into Departmental service as MMY073)	Operational, owned and restored by DownerEDi Marybrough for use as a shunting locomotive.

== See also ==
- New South Wales 73 class locomotive similar locomotive class in New South Wales.
