= Yallourn railway line =

Two former railway lines in Victoria, Australia

Two different railway lines serviced Yallourn during its existence. Both were broad gauge branches from the Gippsland line in Victoria, Australia. The first was a line branching from a junction at Hernes Oak, situated between Moe and Morwell, which was in service from 1922 to 1955. The second Yallourn railway line junctioned at Moe, and was used between 1953 and 1986.

Operated by the Victorian Railways and successors, the lines served the Yallourn Power Station, the associated open cut brown coal mine, and a briquette factory complex, all operated by the State Electricity Commission of Victoria (SECV), as well as the adjacent company town of Yallourn. The alignment of the first branch line has been lost due to the expansion of the Yallourn mine. The second line is now part of the Moe to Yallourn Rail Trail.

== History ==
The first branch was opened in January 1922 to transport briquettes from the briquette production operations at Yallourn to Melbourne, in addition to transporting supplies to the power station located beside the coal mine. It left the main line at Hernes Oak, initially with a staff locked set of points and a loop siding. When traffic increased, that was altered to include a crossing loop, siding, and signal box.

In later years, outward traffic from the briquette works increased, and an electrification program for the Gippsland line was put into place as part of Operation Phoenix. Further complications arose when expansion plans for the Yallourn open cut mine encroached on the alignment of the branch, and given the presence of 1:50 gradients on the line, it was decided to rebuild the line to Yallourn along a completely new alignment.

Work started in 1949 but was hampered by labour shortages, and the new 9.7 kilometre branch, on a 1 in 110 grade, was brought into service in September 1953. The electrification of the new line was not commissioned until September 1955, when work on the main line to Melbourne had been completed. The old route via Hernes Oak was initially retained, being used by down empty to trains, with loaded trains using the new line to return to Melbourne. A new signal box at Yallourn marshalling yard was opened in December 1953, allowing two-way operation on the new line. The old line fell into disuse but was not removed until March 1957, when the SECV began to expand the Yallourn open cut mine across the alignment. At the Hernes Oak end, part of the former line was retained as a dead end siding.

Despite the expansion of the mine, briquette traffic began to decline, with power generation at Yallourn growing in demand instead. Due to the decrease in railway traffic the signal box and interlocking at Yallourn was removed in May 1968, and in April 1974 the substation was taken out of use, overhead power being fed from Moe. In October 1978 electric trains were banned from the line, and in March 1979 work began on removing the overhead wiring. The line itself was closed in December 1986 which was, in effect, just a 'book date'.

== Facilities at Yallourn ==
The sidings at Yallourn crossed the SECV operated Yallourn 900mm railway in a number of places. By 1953 broad gauge facilities in Yallourn included:

- Main line from Moe (new line)
- Main line from Hernes Oak (old line)
- Passenger platform, goods shed and 5 road yard serving the town of Yallourn, all facing a dead end and accessed via the old line
- Sidings to move machinery and other equipment to the briquette factory
- Marshalling yard and sidings to handle the outbound traffic from the briquette factory.
- A reversing triangle
- Coal stage and basic repair facilities
- Sidings serving the SECV workshops for the open cut mine
- Sidings serving the SECV main stores
- Sidings serving the SECV power station
- A line running across the Latrobe River to the Yallourn North open cut mine

At the time of the opening of the new line from Moe, a new railway station and goods shed to serve to town of Yallourn was opened, the responsibility taken by the SECV. The railway station closed to passengers in the 1960s.

== Moe to Yallourn Rail Trail ==
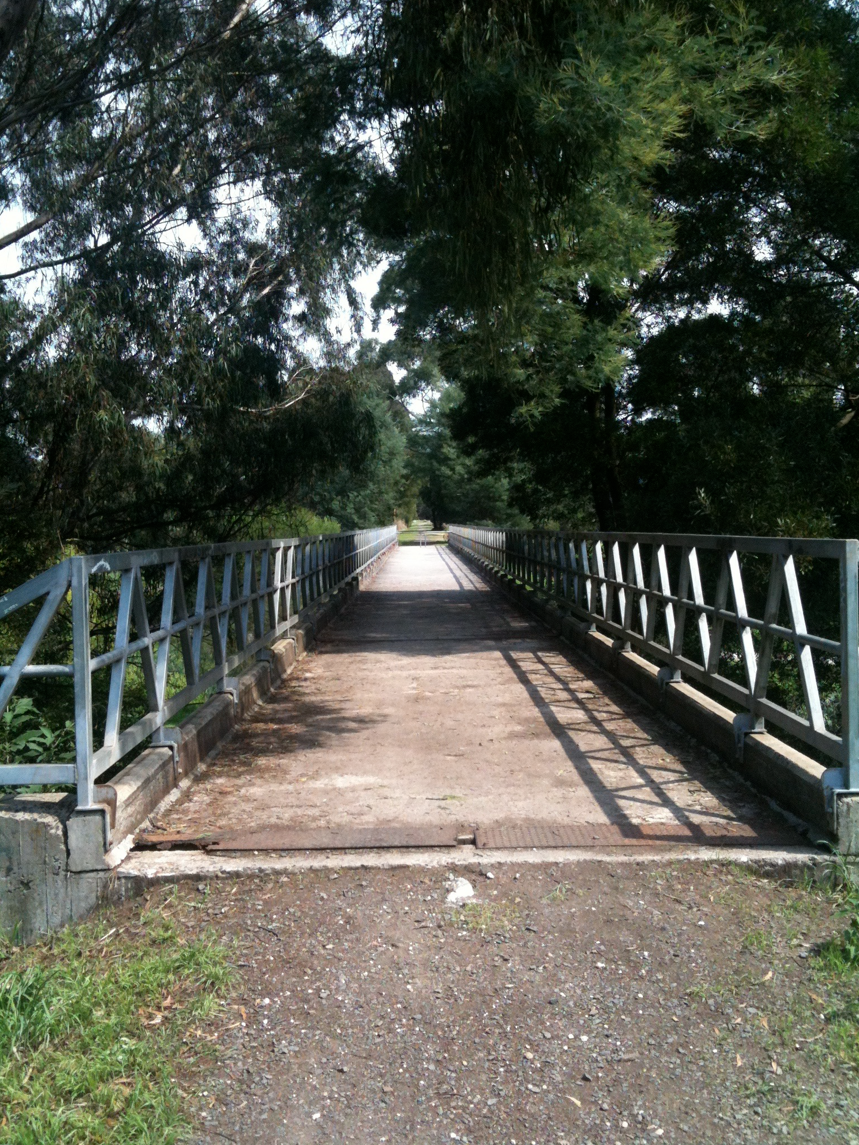
Bridge on the Moe-Yallourn Rail Trail

The former railway was converted into a rail trail after closure, running from Narracan Dve in Moe to the Yallourn West power station.

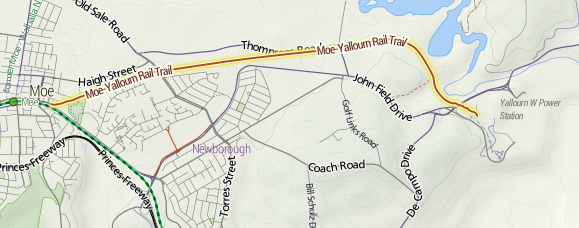
Map of the Moe-Yallourn Rail Trail.
