= Gippsland railway line =

Railway line in Victoria, Australia

Gippsland line
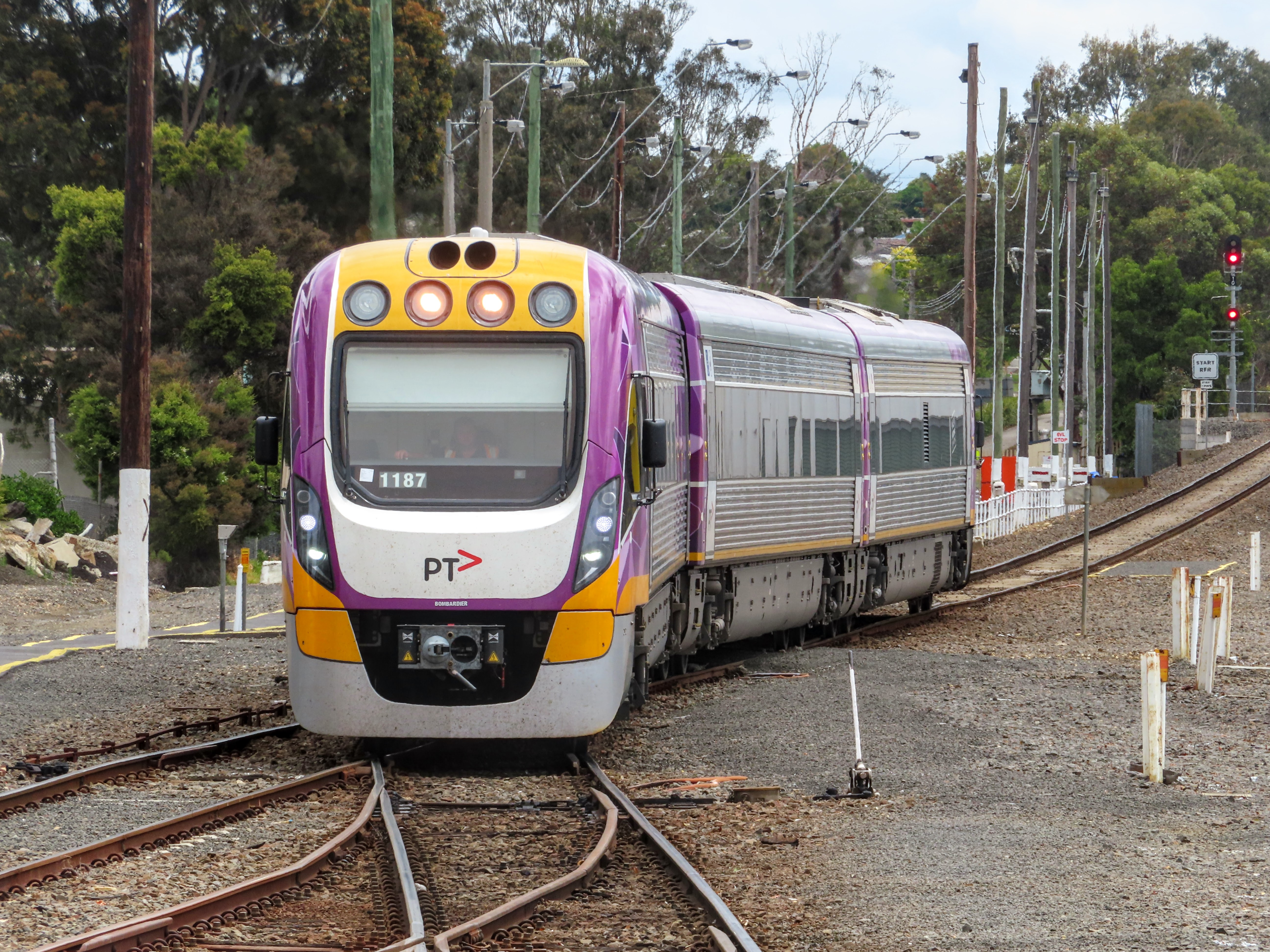
- V/Line train at Traralgon, 2020

Overview
- Status: Operational from Flinders Street to Bairnsdale, closed beyond Bairnsdale
- Owner: VicTrack
- Locale: Victoria, Australia
- Termini: Flinders Street; Bairnsdale (previously Orbost)

Service
- Services: Bairnsdale; Cranbourne; Pakenham; Traralgon
- Operator(s): Passenger: Metro Trains, V/Line; Freight: Multiple

History
- Work began: 1877; 149 years ago
- Completed: 1916; 110 years ago

Technical
- Number of tracks: Double track between Melbourne and Bunyip, and between Longwarry and Moe, single track between Bunyip and Longwarry and beyond Moe (passing loops at Hernes Oak, and at Morwell, Traralgon and Sale stations)
- Track gauge: 1,600 mm (5 ft 3 in)
- Electrification: 1500 V DC overhead between Flinders Street and East Pakenham
- Signalling: Automatic block signalling: Southern Cross to East Pakenham; Bombardier CITYFLO 650 CBTC: Hawksburn to Clayton; Automatic and Track Control: East Pakenham to Traralgon; Train Staff and Ticket: Traralgon to Bairnsdale
- Train protection system: TPWS: Southern Cross to Traralgon

The Gippsland railway line (formerly known as the Orbost railway line) is a railway line serving the Latrobe Valley and Gippsland regions of Victoria, Australia. It runs east from the state capital Melbourne through Warragul, Moe, Morwell, Traralgon, Sale and terminating at Bairnsdale.

Prior to the closure of the section east of Bairnsdale in 1987, the line extended to Orbost. The formation of that now-dismantled section has become the East Gippsland Rail Trail, a shared bicycle, walking, and horse-riding track.

== Services ==
Metro Trains Melbourne operates suburban passenger services along the inner section of the line as the Pakenham line, while V/Line services operate as the Traralgon and the Bairnsdale lines. Freight services also use the line, operated by Qube Holdings.

== History ==
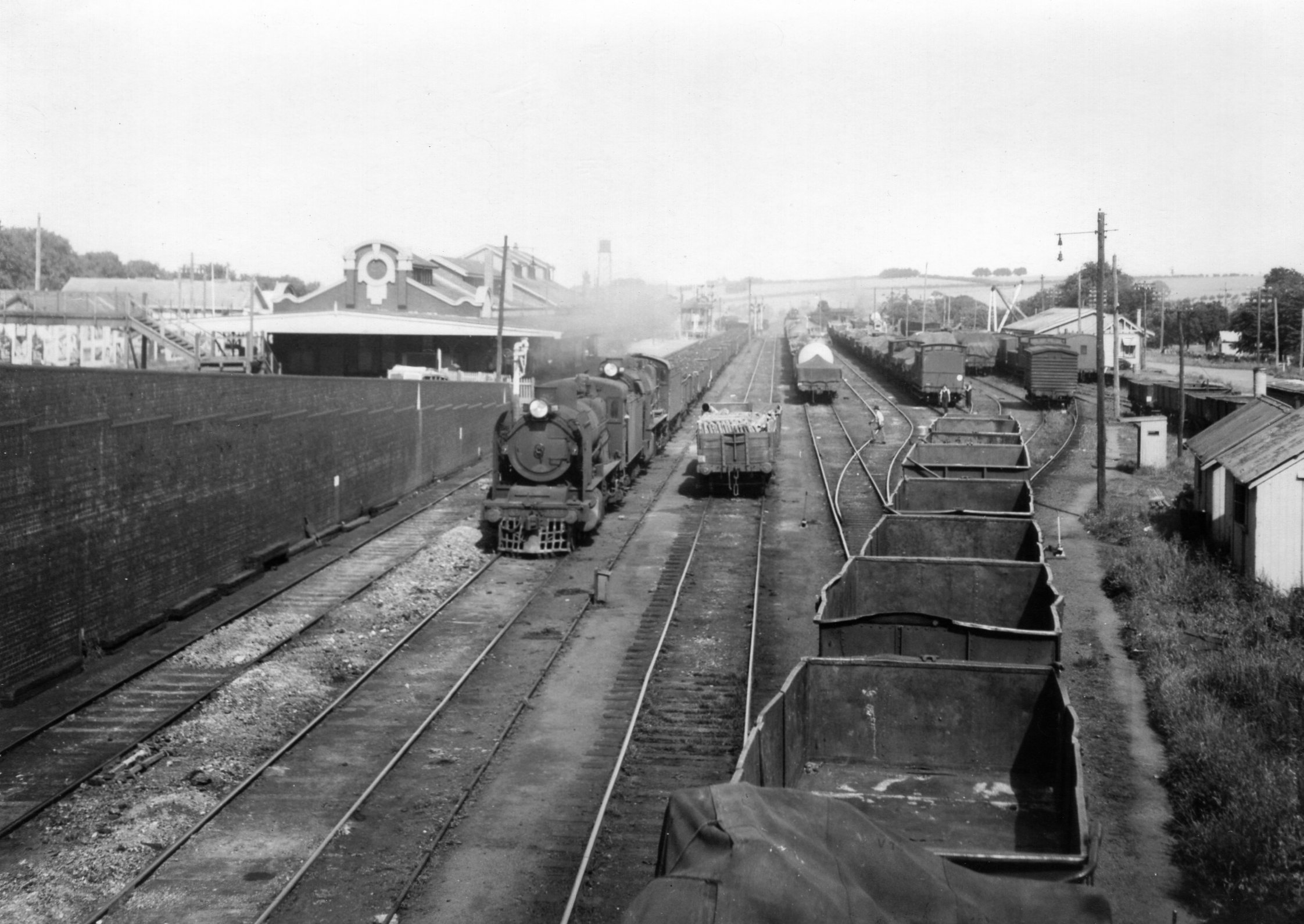
Double headed coal train passing westbound through Warragul station, c. 1920

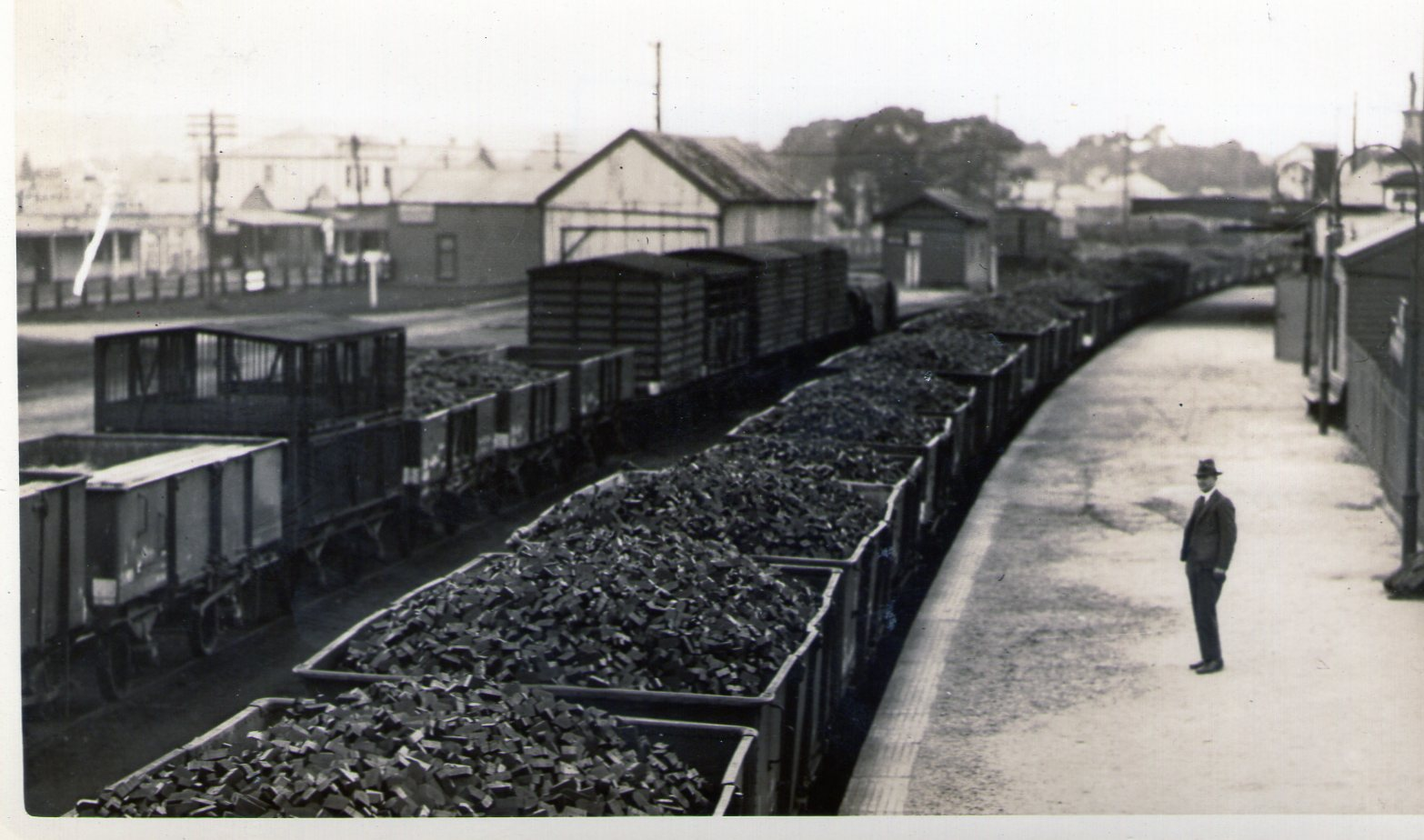
Coal train passing through Moe Station, c. 1920

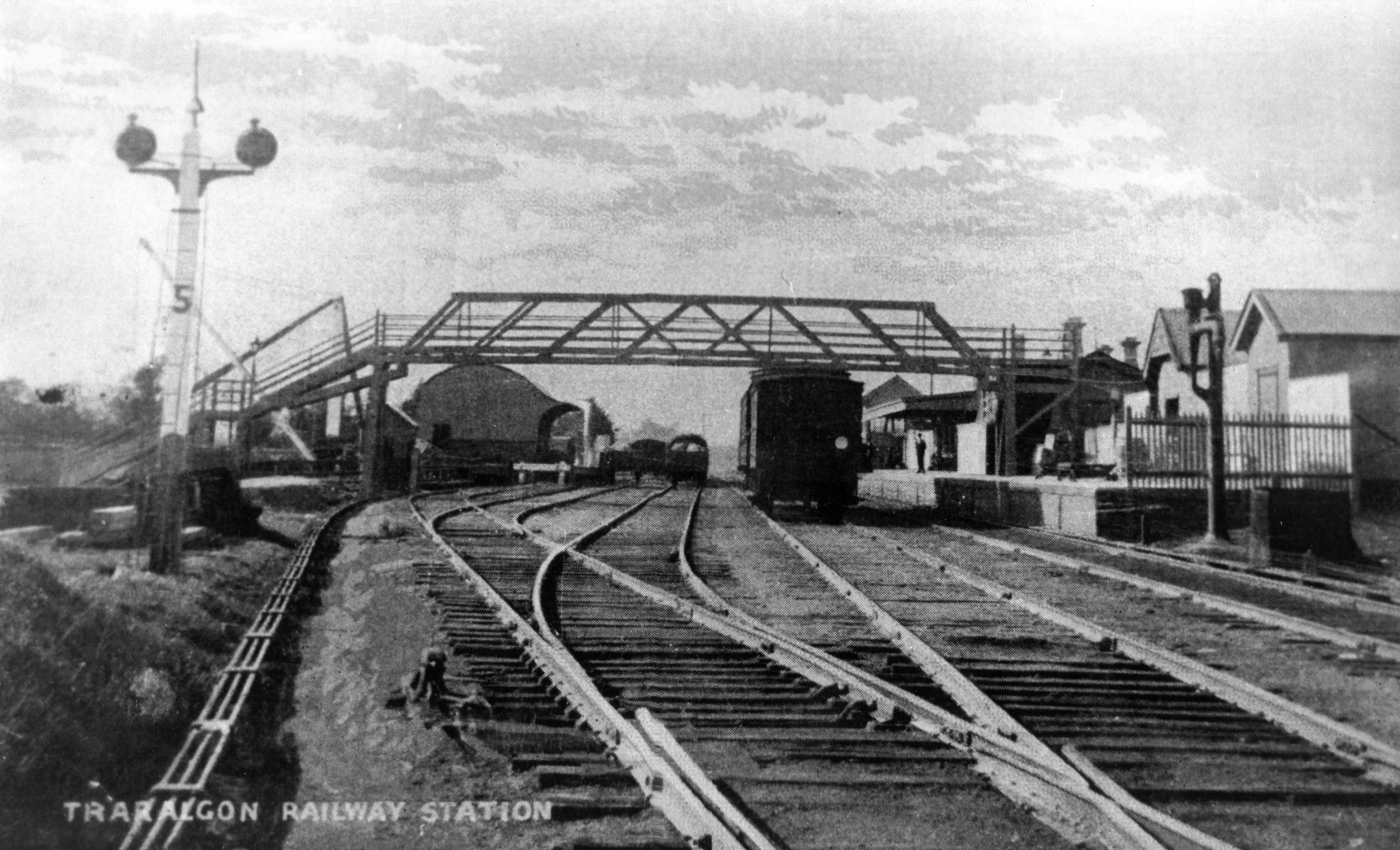
Traralgon railway station, c.1920

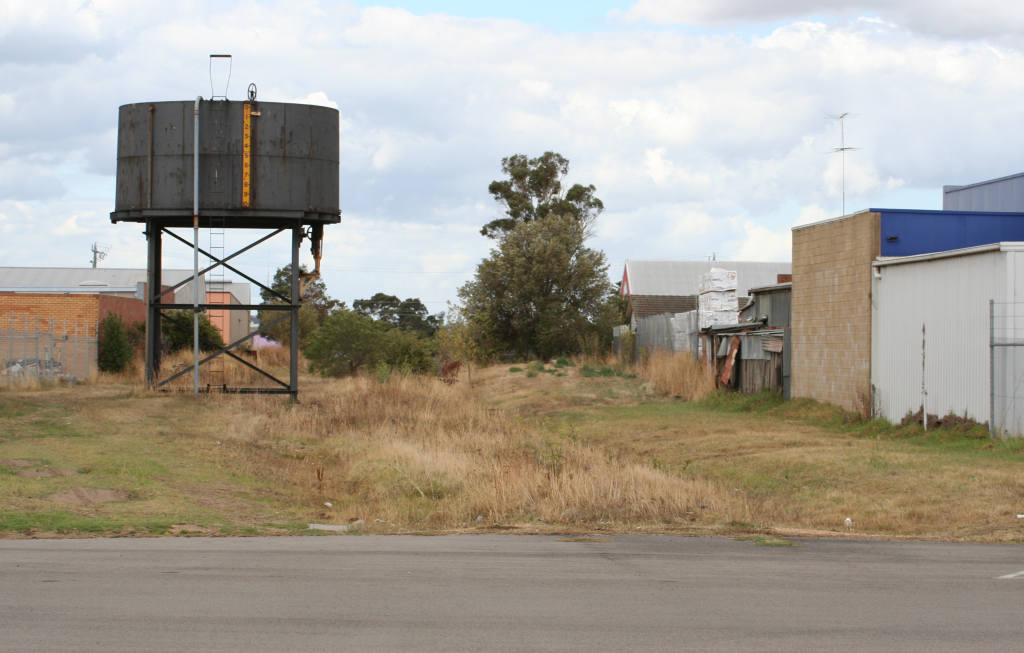
The end of the line at Bairnsdale, 2007

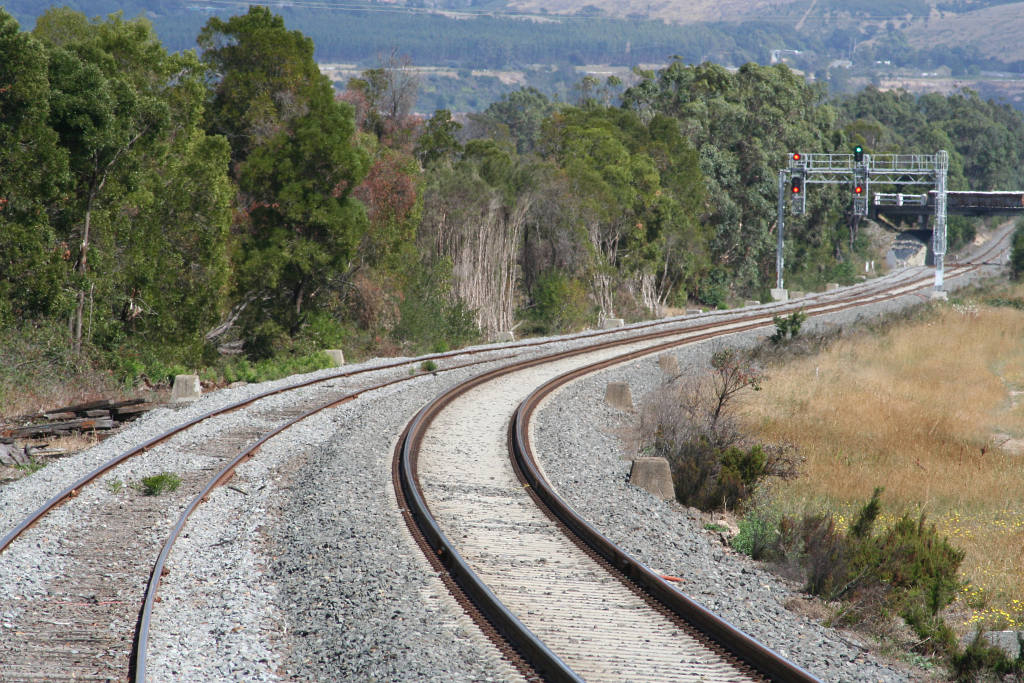
Section of track at Morwell Loop, upgraded as part of the Regional Fast Rail project, 2007

The trunk railway was built to Gippsland in the 1870s and initially played a crucial role in developing agricultural industries in Gippsland as well as tourism. It also played a pivotal role in the development of coal mining in the Latrobe Valley in the 1920s.

At its greatest extent, the railway extended as far east as Orbost, while parts of the disused main line and its branches have become tourist railways or rail trails.

The Melbourne and Suburban Railway Company opened a line from Princes Bridge railway station to Punt Road (Richmond) and South Yarra and Prahran in 1859, and to Windsor in 1860, connecting with the St Kilda and Brighton Railway Company line. This line was extended to Dandenong, Pakenham, Warragul, Moe, Morwell, Traralgon, Sale, Stratford and Bairnsdale between 1877 and 1879. It was extended to Orbost in 1916.

The railway to the terminus Orbost operated until 1987, principally carrying timber and farming produce. In the early days of the railway's operation, passenger services were provided, but they had ceased by the 1930s. The track infrastructure beyond Bairnsdale was dismantled in 1994. The line traversed a mixture of farmland, hills and heavily forested country, and included numerous bridges, including the Stoney Creek trestle bridge, the largest of its kind in Victoria.

In 1954, the line from Dandenong to Traralgon was electrified, mainly because of the expected briquette traffic from the brown coal mines in the Latrobe Valley. Over the next two years most of the line between Dandenong and Pakenham was duplicated and provided with power signalling, although the Narre Warren to Berwick section was not done until 1962. Over time, the rail transport of briquettes petered out as industry converted to natural gas and homes were converted to other forms of heating.

Electrification was cut back to Warragul in 1987, with suburban-style trains providing the services from there to Melbourne. Electrification was further cut back to Bunyip in 1998, before ceasing entirely beyond Pakenham in 2001. The line east of Sale was closed in 1994, but was reopened to Bairnsdale in 2004. In 2005, the Regional Fast Rail project upgraded one of the two lines between Pakenham and Traralgon. This project also included removing the remaining electrification infrastructure from Pakenham East Depot to Traralgon, with the exception of a heritage-listed length in Bunyip.

== Branch lines ==
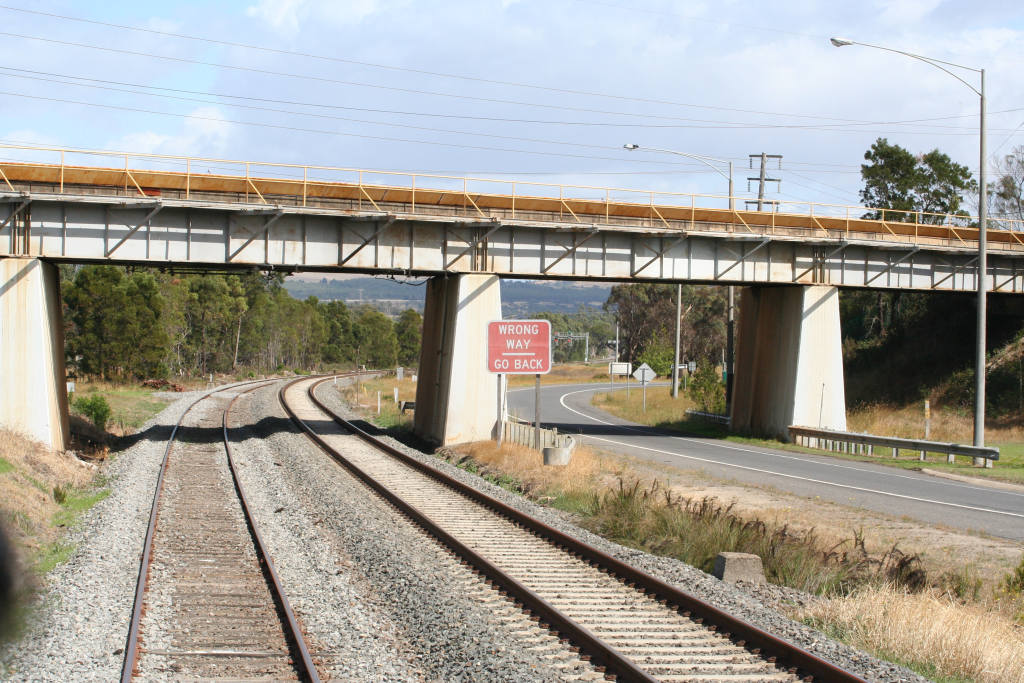
The Morwell Interconnecting Railway bridge crossing the Gippsland railway and Commercial Road, on the western edge of Morwell, 2007

The Noojee railway line was built north from Warragul in stages from the 1890s, reaching Noojee in 1919. It was closed in stages from 1954 to 1958.

In 1910, the 762 mm (2 ft 6 in) Walhalla railway line was completed through mountainous country from Moe to Erica and Walhalla. The Platina to Walhalla section closed in 1944, Erica to Platina section in 1952, and Moe to Erica section in 1954. The northernmost section, between Thomson and Walhalla stations, has been reopened as a tourist railway by the Walhalla Goldfields Railway, and provides regularly scheduled trains.

The Thorpdale railway line was also opened from Moe to Thorpdale in 1888. It was closed in 1958.

The Yallourn branch was opened from Hernes Oak (between Moe and Morwell) to Yallourn in 1922 to serve the adjacent power station development. It was replaced by a line from Moe to Yallourn in 1953 because its route was required for brown coal mining, but the new line closed in 1987, having been disused since the late 1970s.

The Mirboo North branch line was opened in stages from Morwell to Mirboo North between 1885 and 1886; however, it was closed in 1974. The route of the line was partly dug up as part of the Hazelwood open cut mine. The Maryvale paper siding also connects to the main line at Morwell and remains open today for regular freight traffic.

The loop line via Maffra was opened from Traralgon to Heyfield, Maffra and Stratford in 1887, which was closed in stages between 1987 and 1993. A branch line was opened from Maffra to Briagolong in 1889 and closed in 1952.

There used to be several timber tramways running to a number of the stations between Pakenham and Yarragon.

== Significance ==
The extension of the railway to Gippsland in the late 1870s stimulated development in the region. It enabled milk from western Gippsland to be sold fresh into Melbourne, while the dairy industry of East Gippsland provided cheese and butter. It also opened west Gippsland's market gardening and orcharding industry to markets in Melbourne.

It also encouraged the development of a tourism industry, notably at Lakes Entrance, but led to the end of the coastal shipping trade, and the use of Sale and Bairnsdale as ports.

In the 1920s, the Gippsland railway played an important role in developing the mining of brown coal and the development of the Latrobe Valley for power generation, serving Victoria. That led to the development of towns such as Yallourn, Morwell, Traralgon, Moe, Warragul and Drouin.

The construction of the Gippsland Railway helped fuel the Melbourne Land Boom of the 1880s. The Gippsland railway initially originated at Oakleigh, because the line from Oakleigh to Melbourne was privately owned by the Melbourne and Hobson's Bay Railway Company (M&HBRC). The Victorian Railways bought land in Oakleigh for use as workshops.

However, the government acquired the M&HBRC in 1878, which then allowed Gippsland trains to run directly to the city. That facilitated suburban subdivision along the line and, at the height of the Land Boom in 1888, land sales were being held two or three times a week in the catchment of the line.

The Gippsland railway remains a significant passenger corridor on the V/Line network, although freight business has drastically declined, with the exception of export traffic from the Australian Paper mill at Maryvale, near Morwell.

== Tourist railways and rail trails ==
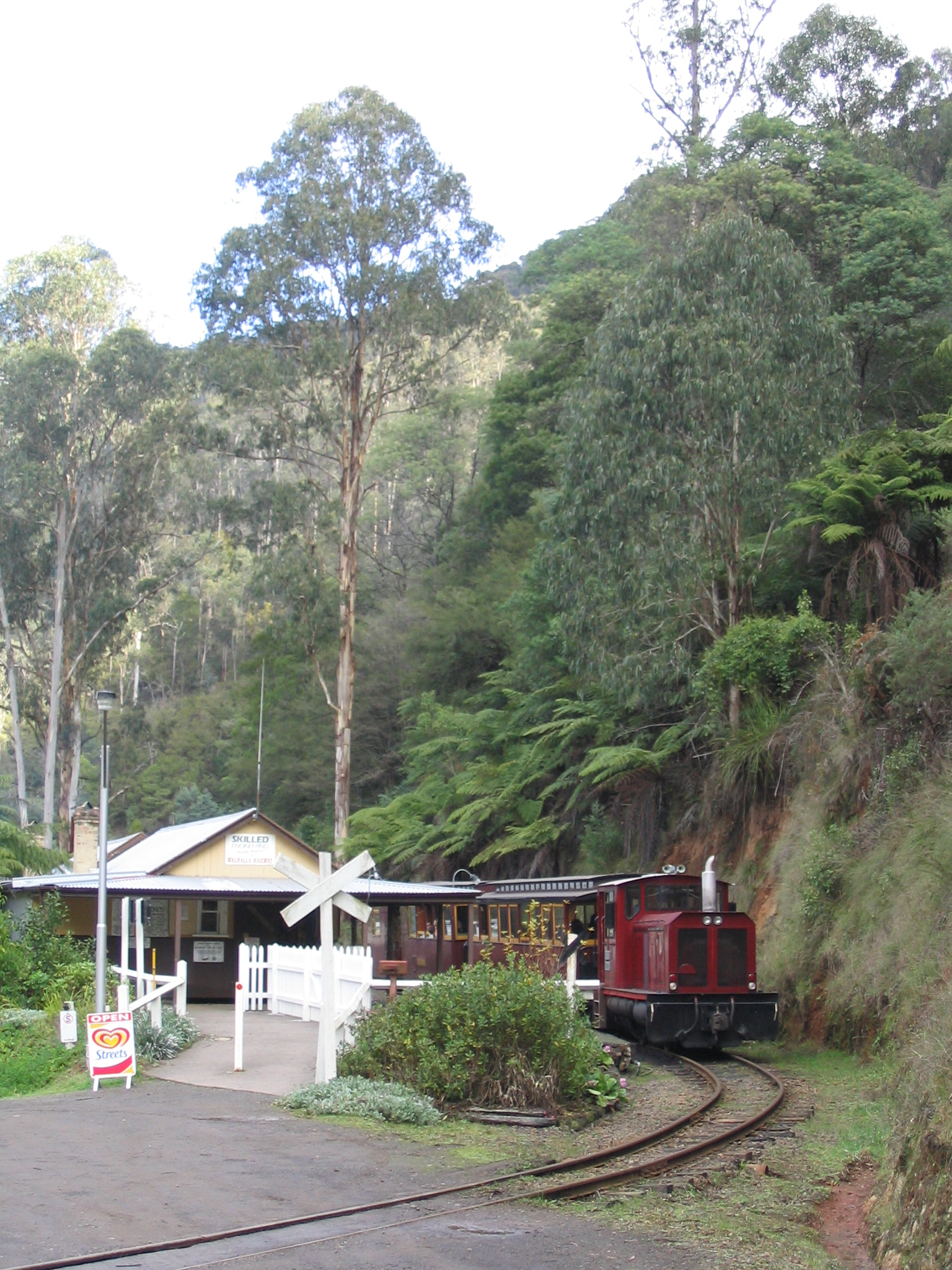
Walhalla Goldfields Railway, 2007

Many of the lines in Gippsland have closed because they had become uneconomic. Some of these have been turned into tourist railways, and other bits into rail trails. The only tourist railway left operating is the Walhalla Goldfields Railway between Moe and Walhalla. Until 2016, the South Gippsland Railway operated services between Leongatha and Nyora, via Korumburra, however, services ceased in 2015 and the line is now being converted to a rail trail.

Other stretches of line have become rail trails for use by bicyclists. These include:

- the Noojee Trestle Bridge Trail in the upper reaches of the Latrobe River;
- a section between Erica and the Thomson River on the former Walhalla line (pending eventual reconstruction of the Walhalla Goldfields Railway's tourist line between Thomson and Erica stations).;
- Collins Siding to Tyers Valley Rail Trail near Moe;
- Moe to Yallourn Rail Trail;
- Mirboo North to Boolarra Rail Trail;
- Great Southern Rail Trail from Leongatha to Foster; with extensions under construction to a planned length from Nyora to Yarram.
- Bass Coast Rail Trail Anderson to Wonthaggi;
- East Gippsland Rail Trail from Bairnsdale to Nowa Nowa and Orbost; and the
- Gippsland Plains Rail Trail from Stratford to Maffra.

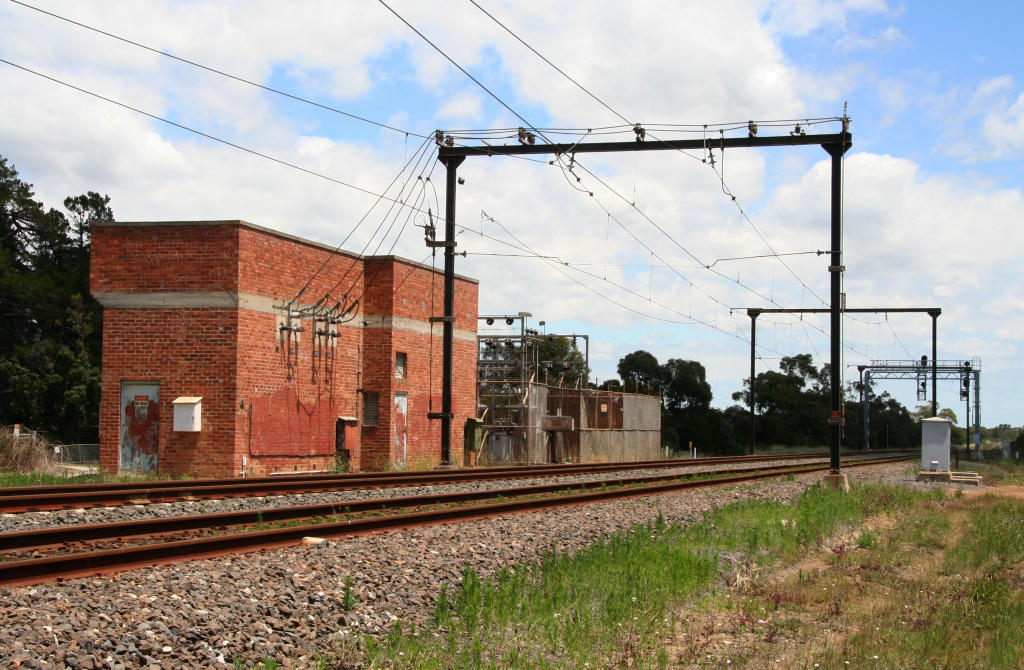
Preserved electrical substation and overhead wiring at Bunyip, 2008

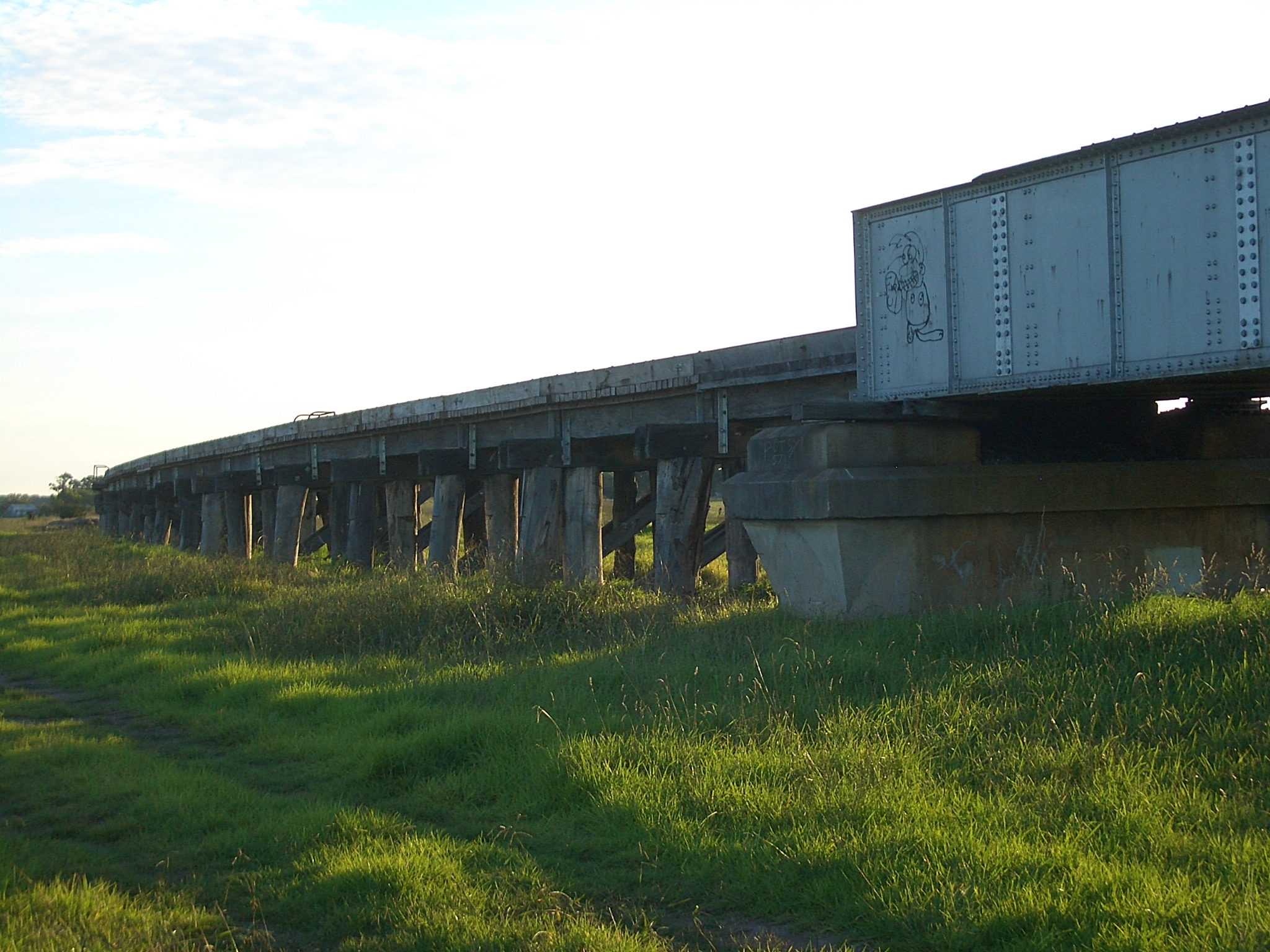
Section of the old railway bridge across the Avon River near Stratford, 2008
