= West Melbourne Gasworks =

The West Melbourne Gasworks was a coal gasification plant in West Melbourne, Victoria, Australia.

== History ==
Melbourne was settled in 1835 and by the early 1850s, the gold rushes had led to rapid population growth. The City of Melbourne Gas and Coke Company leased 5 acres (2 hectares) of Crown Land in 1854 to construct a plant on the north bank of the Yarra River, between Victoria Dock and what is today known as Moonee Ponds Creek. The plant used black coal from Maitland, New South Wales to generate gas for domestic and industrial uses, as well as to fuel street lights. A second plant was constructed later at South Melbourne, but both were phased out when the Esso-BHP consortium started offshore gas extraction in Bass Strait, between Victoria and Tasmania. Coal was delivered by ship from the Port of Newcastle to a Tee-shaped wharf on the riverbank, where four hydraulic cranes unloaded the boats.

=== West Melbourne tramway ===
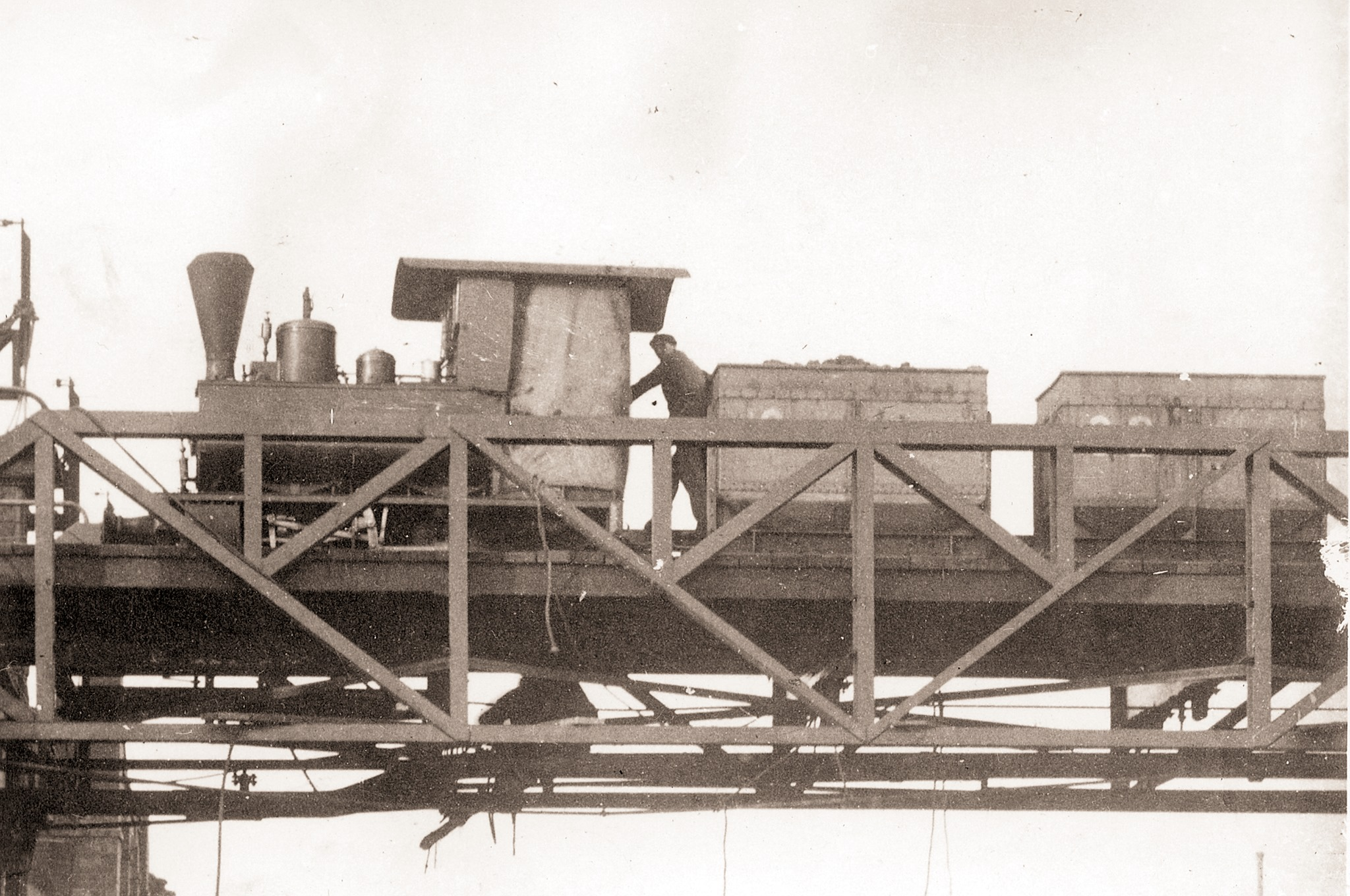
Couillet steam locomotive at the West Melbourne Gas Works

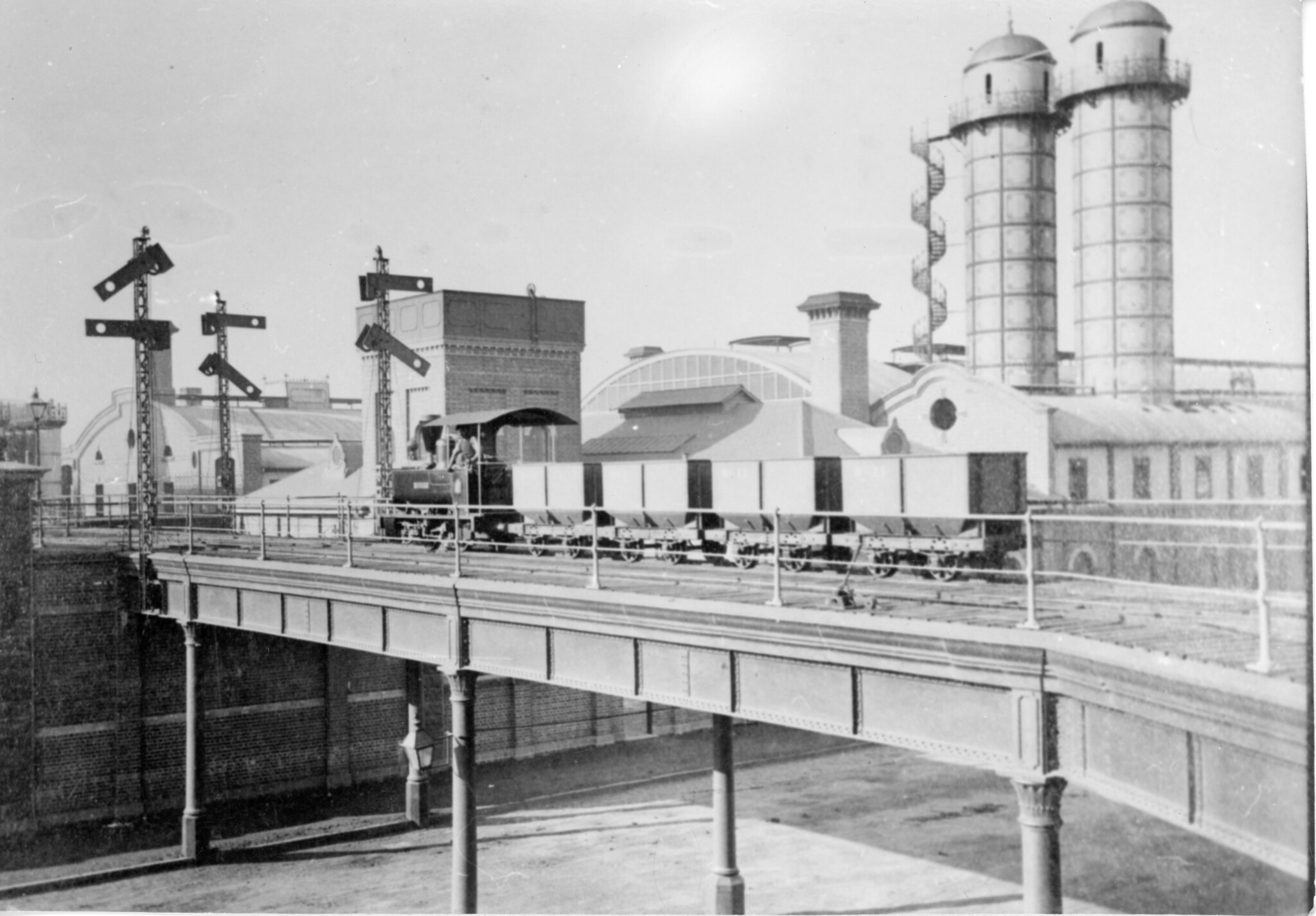
Decauville locomotive Carbon (Decauville N° 90, Couillet N° 986) or John Benn (Decauville N° 43, Couillet N° 861) of Metropolitan Gas, Melbourne on bridge over Flinders Street West (Industrial Railway Society collection)

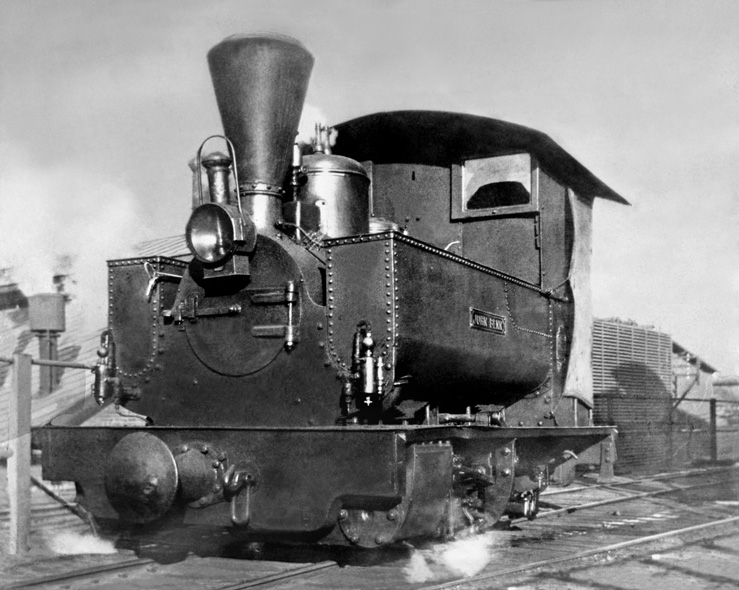
Metropolitan Gas Co. 2ft6in gauge 0-4-0T locomotive ‘John Benn’, made by Couillet in Belgium on Decauville principles in 1886 to work the West Melbourne tramway

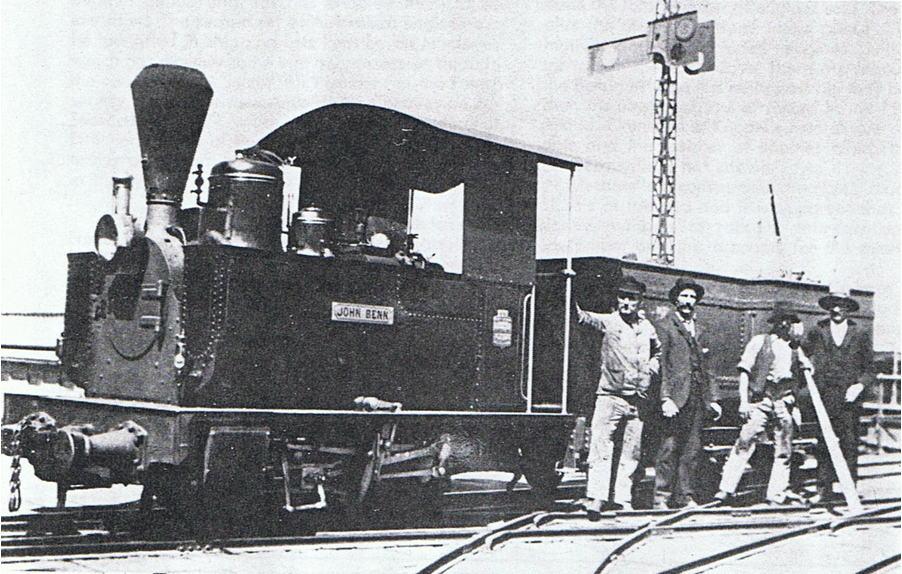
Decauville locomotive 'John Benn' of the Metropolitan Gas Company in Melbourne built in 1886

==== 2 ft 6 in (762 mm) system ====
A small railway was built in the 1880s to 2 ft 6 in (762 mm), running from both branches of the wharf to a central, double-track bridge over North Wharf Road. From there the west track branched to run around the building, while the right branched to a coke siding. Both tracks also continued north to the engine shed and coal shed, eventually meeting up with the west branch that had run on a trestle bridge around the building. Turnouts on the line were provided with French-style semaphore point indicators on lattice masts, and were worked by weighted point levers with under-deck operating rods.

The tramway initially had two identical 0-4-0T locomotives, built by Couillet for Decauville as No.861 John Benn, named for the company chairman, and No.986 Carbon, built in 1886 and 1890 respectively. Coal was shovelled from the ships into the crane buckets, then lifted and deposited into the fleet of fifty, two-axle, 2 long tons (2.0 t) hopper wagons which were individually winched and turned into position to form six-wagon trains. These would make a loop around the building, returning to the wharf for the next load of coal. A round trip was probably something like 1,000 yards (910 m).

In 1930 the west branch of the tramway around the building was removed, to make way for a new electric conveyor belt system. That was made active in 1933 and both the original engines were placed into storage, while the Peckett engine (see below) was brought over from South Melbourne as a standby engine for use if and when the conveyor system was insufficient, such as during winters through 1941. From then on all three engines were kept in storage in the engine shed north of the retort house, with only a coat of tallow to protect them.

All three engines were painted dark green with no lining, exposed brass and copper fittings and nameplates polished. The coal tubs were painted dark grey with black underframes. All vehicles were fitted with a central buffer, and hooks either side for coupling chains.

==== 500 mm (19 3/4 in) system ====
The Gasworks also made use of 1,100 m (3,600 ft) of 500 mm (19 3/4 in) of portable track inside the main building, using 4.5 kg/m (9.1 lb/yd) rails and 51 hand-pushed, four-wheel side-tipping hopper wagons to load coal from the delivery railway, via an elevator and tippler, into the retorts (sealed pipes) where it would be heated to generate the gas for capture and sale.

=== South Melbourne tramway ===
A second gas-making plant was built in the 1920s at South Melbourne, linked to the old Town Pier at Port Melbourne. A double-track surface line linked the pier to the new facility, running along the street in front of buildings. To operate the line a third engine, an 0-4-0ST Jurassic class. saddle tank built by Peckett & Sons as No.1711 of 1926, was purchased. It was named Sir John Grice after the then-current Chairman of the company. But after one test trip the Port Melbourne City Council refused to let the engine operate on their streets, so the tramway remained horse-drawn until motorised vehicles became an option.

=== Disposal and preservation ===
The engines were offered free to any takers in 1946, but were not disposed of until 1962. Engines Sir John Grice and John Benn were dismantled and removed to The Basin, Victoria, while Carbon was taken to Walhalla railway station. The latter ran on a circular track for a few years with an adapted Victorian Railways wagon.

In 1966 all three engines were sold. John Benn was sold to Ron Kain and Don Marshall for the second attempt at restoring the Walhalla railway as the Walhalla and Thomson River Steam Tramway; it would be rebuilt in Tecoma as an American Western-themed 2-4-2ST, painted blue and named Helen, arriving at Walhalla in 1969 and entering service there in 1973, working with an NQ open truck fitted with seats and an NU louvre van recovered from Moyhu, on the former Whitfield railway line. The Walhalla Tramway experienced difficulties and eventually lost support, resulting in the engine and its wagons being sold to Colin Rees of the CRT Group, who organised their delivery to the Puffing Billy Railway.

Also in 1966, Carbon and Sir John Grice were sold to Jack Griffiths who was building the Frankston Whistle Stop Amusement Park. The former was restored with a primarily yellow body, renumbered as No.90 without a name, and ran on a circular, 0.75 mi (1.21 km) track around an artificial lake from 1968 to 1974 when the park was forced to close due to increasing costs. The Peckett was still dismantled and partially restored at this time, and in an asset sale on 16 October 1974 it was purchased by the Puffing Billy Preservation Society where it was then restored to working order. It ran its first test trip in December 1981.

Carbon was passed-in at the auction and, as of October 1985, was thought to be in a private shed in Red Hill, Victoria. Later, it joined the other two engines on the Puffing Billy Preservation Society, where each of the three engines are rated for two carriages, or a maximum of 20 long tons (20 t) between Belgrave and Cockatoo, then 16 long tons (16 t) from Cockatoo to Gembrook.

== Winding down ==
In 1962, the works were upgraded to incorporate a catalytic oil gas facility, but this was short-lived. In 1970, the works was closed down and the remaining structures were all demolished by 1974.

== Site extent ==
The works were gradually expanded between 1900 and 1910, eventually covering 8 hectares (20 acres) in an area now extending from Waterview Walk to the Yarra River, with the new Collins Street extension and Harbour Esplanade running through the site.
