= Walhalla Goldfields Railway =

Narrow gauge tourist railway in Victoria, Australia

Coordinates: 37°57′8″S 146°26′8″E

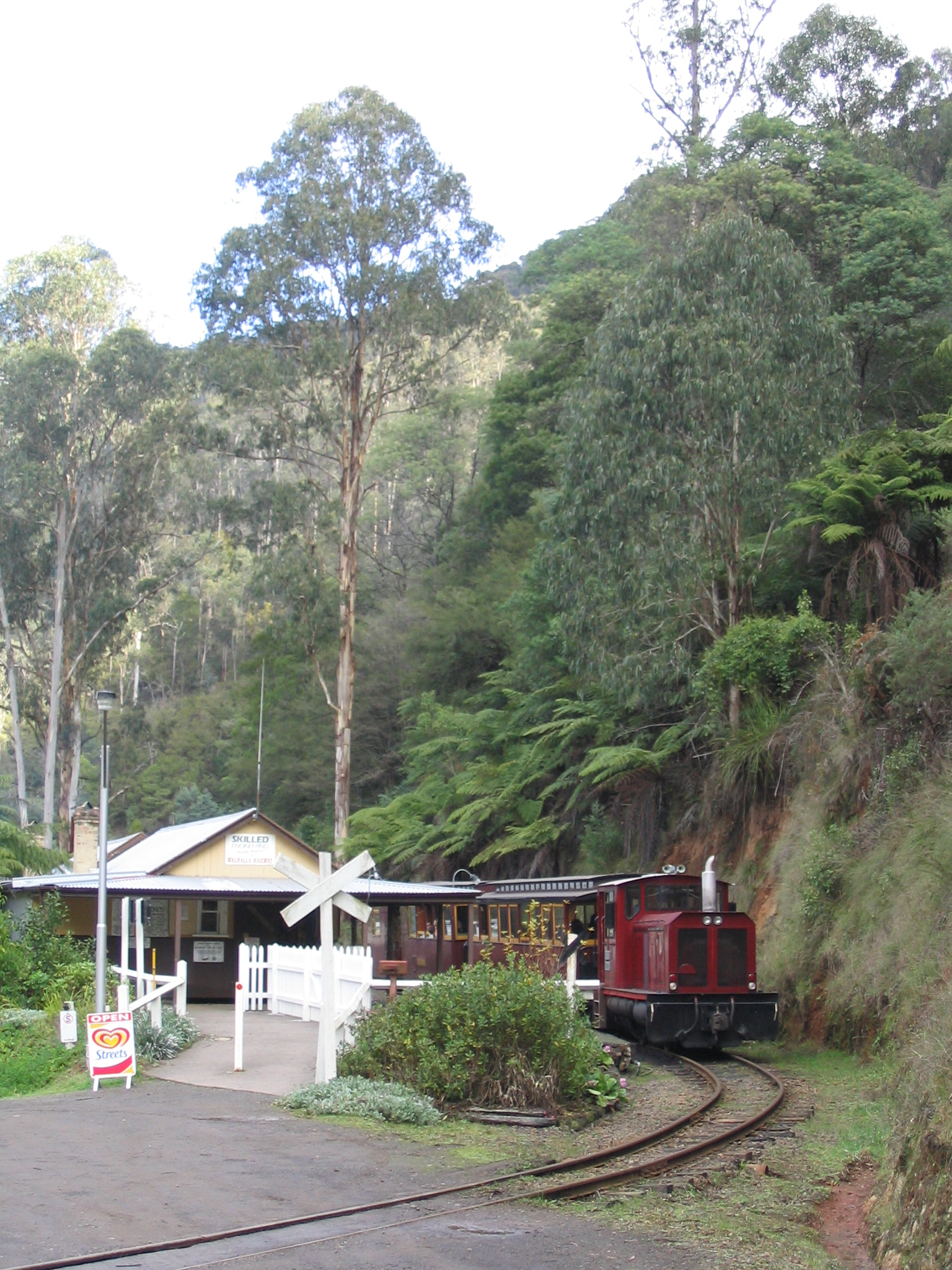
- A train leaving Thomson station

Overview
- Status: Tourist Railway
- Termini: Walhalla; Thomson
- Former connections: Orbost railway line
- Website: walhallarail.com.au

Service
- Type: Tourist railway

History
- Completed: 1910
- Closed: 1954
- Reopened: 1994

Technical
- Line length: 2 mi 13 ch (3.5 km)
- Number of tracks: Single track
- Track gauge: 2 ft 6 in (762 mm)

The Walhalla Goldfields Railway is a 2 ft 6 in (762 mm) narrow gauge tourist railway located in the Thomson River and Stringers Creek valleys in Gippsland, Victoria, Australia, near the former gold-mining town and tourist destination of Walhalla.

== Original railway ==
The Walhalla railway line was the last of four experimental narrow-gauge lines of the Victorian Railways. The Moe-Walhalla railway commenced construction in 1904, but was not completed until 1910. The railway was expected to be a boon for Walhalla but by the time it reached the town the gold had mostly run out, with the final mines closing only a few years later.

After the closure of the Walhalla mines, substantial timber traffic was carried from saw-mills around Erica until the late 1940s. Goods and passenger traffic declined, with the railway closed in sections from 1944 with the final section from Moe to Erica closed on 25 June 1954, with the last train operating four days later. The tracks and buildings were removed by 1960, leaving only the roadbed and a number of bridges.

The former station building at Walhalla was re-located to the Melbourne suburban station of Hartwell in 1938. The centre span of the National Estate listed Thomson River Railway Bridge had originally been sourced from a road bridge over the Murray River at Tocumwal, before being used for the narrow gauge line.

== Tourist attraction ==
The railway is a key tourist attraction for Walhalla. The Walhalla Goldfields Railway operates regular tourist services between Thomson and Walhalla stations, using diesel locomotives.

Trains run on Wednesdays, Saturdays and Sundays departing Walhalla at 10 am, 12 pm and 1.30 pm (with no 1.30 pm service on Wednesdays or from June to August). During school holidays trains operate up to three services daily. Passengers may book return or one-way trips. As of January 2026, online tickets must be purchased by 8 a.m. on the day of travel.

The train journey begins in the Walhalla Heritage Precinct, travelling through the station yard between Stringers Creek and the cliff-face that underpins the Happy-Go-Lucky Road. The first kilometre and a half is almost entirely built over six large trestle bridges that criss-cross Stringers Creek Gorge in an effort to find anchorage for each bridge abutment.

The train winds its way downhill through Stringers' Gorge and across the historic Thomson River Bridge to arrive at Thomson Station. Visitors have time to explore the area before returning to Walhalla.

== Early preservation attempts ==
Before the successful Walhalla Goldfields Railway, a number of separate endeavours were made to preserve and operate parts of the Walhalla line.

=== Meadmore ===
The first of these was in 1950 when Clement R. W. Meadmore, the pioneer of what is now the Diamond Valley Railway in Eltham, Victoria, attempted to restore part of the line at Walhalla. Legally it could not operate as a railway, but a tramway was deemed acceptable, so in March 1951 he and his group started clearing undergrowth and landslides to restore the alignment through Stringers Gorge. They also arranged purchase of some unpowered and powered trolleys, including one fitted with blades at one end to help clear the line. This clearing of the track included cutting up the log that had speared across the railway at Thomson station. The group considered purchasing the Forest Commission's Climax locomotive from Erica or an ex-West Melbourne Gasworks engine which had been offered to the group for £100. However, flooding of Stringers Creek in June 1952 washed logs from sawmills downstream, smashing into and destroying trestle bridges and ending the project.

=== Ferris ===
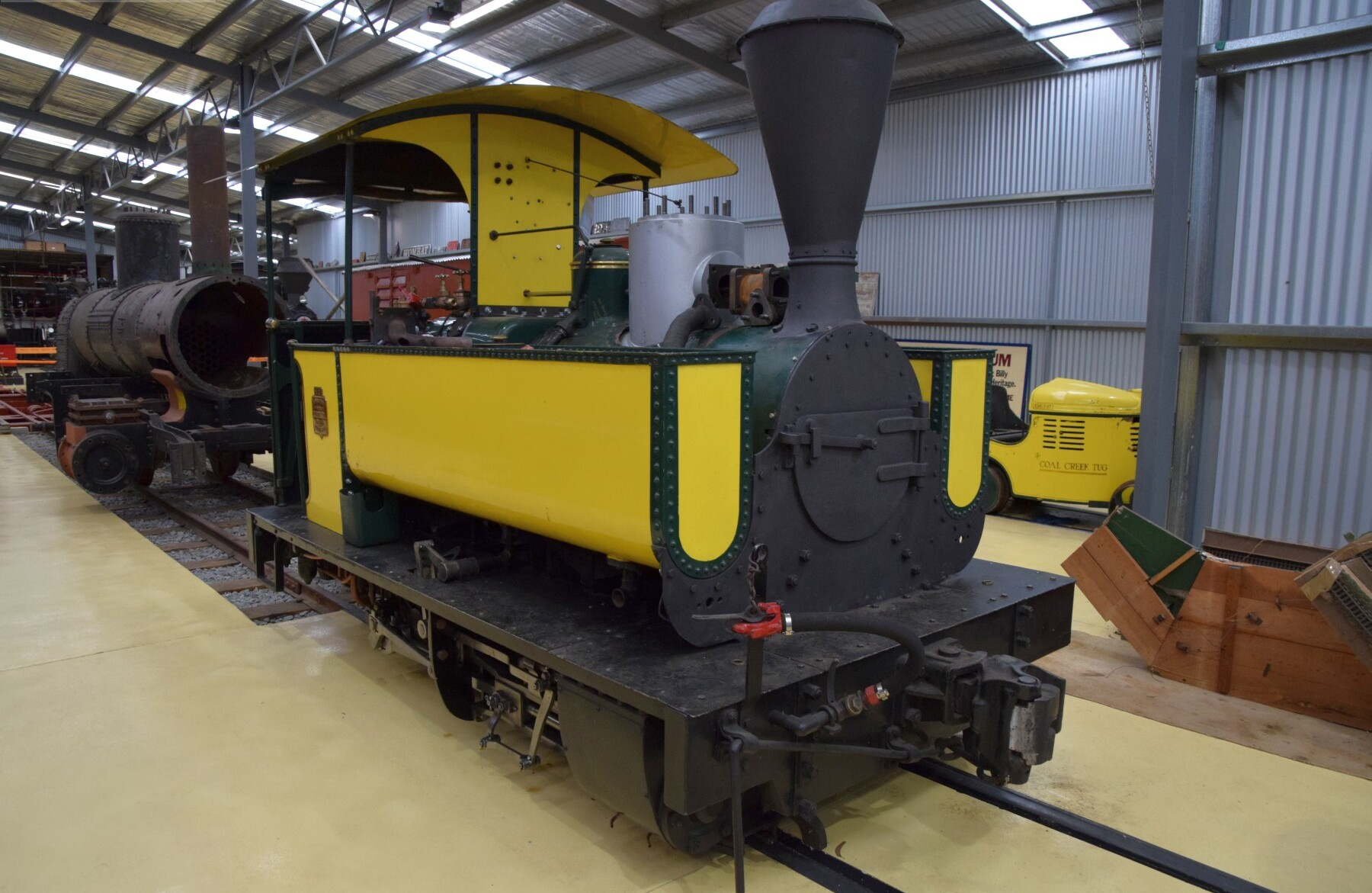
Decauville locomotive 'Carbon' at the Menzies Creek Museum - September 2016. This engine was based at Walhalla briefly in the early 1960s.

In 1959 Walhalla resident Bill Ferris had purchased his ex-Melbourne Gasworks locomotive 986 Carbon to the shed at Walhalla and restored it to working order, with a small circle of track built in the middle of town. In 1961 the railways refused to allow him to operate the engine on the Walhalla line, and he ended up selling the locomotive to the Frankston Whistle Stop amusement park.

That park was owned by Jack Griffith and operated from the 1966 to 1974 with about 0.75 mi (1.21 km) of track, among a range of other amusements. Most of those assets were sent to the Caribbean Gardens after the park closed, while the locomotive went on to the Puffing Billy Railway, where it is now an exhibit at the Menzies Creek museum. The park had featured a two-thirds scale replica of Walhalla station, and along with the locomotive there had been a carriage aesthetically similar to the Victorian Railways' NBH carriages, but painted yellow and with an open clerestory in the centre of the arch roof.

=== Walhalla & Thompson River Steam Tramway ===
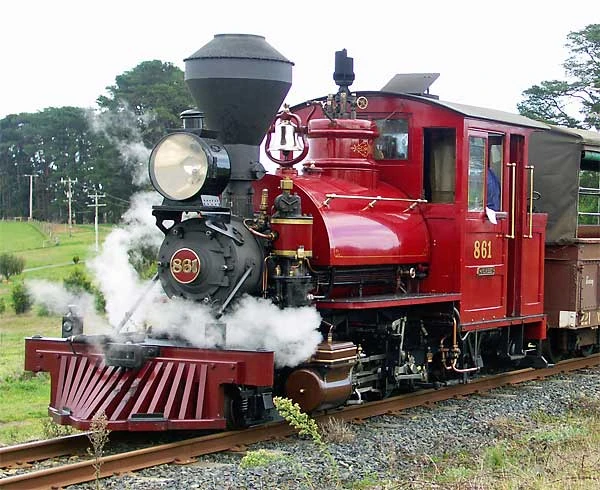
N° 861 or 'J. C. Rees', as in service on the Puffing Billy Railway. This engine was based at Walhalla 1973-1977.

By the 1960s Walhalla's population had fallen to about 30 residents, and the area around Stringers Gorge was practically a Ghost town. The Star Hotel had burned down in 1951, the local school closed in 1965, and in 1973 the population was less than twenty people. The town did not have an electricity supply, being reliant on gas bottles, and there was no reticulated water supply either.

A few years after the departure of Carbon to the Frankston Whistle Stop Amusement Park, former Victorian Railways driver Ron Kain purchased a different former Melbourne Gasworks locomotive of the same design, number 861 John Benn. Kain moved to Walhalla in 1968 and established the Walhalla & Thompson River Steam Tramway. His locomotive followed in 1969, while in the meantime receiving donations of 45 lb/yd (22 kg/m) rails from Geelong's Fyansford Cement Works Railway.

Kain had a number of structures built in the town, including houses and a new brick railway station in Walhalla yard. Furthermore, the company took on assorted contracting and transport jobs within the town in an attempt to raise funds for the line's restoration. Aesthetically, the company used styles intentionally counter to those of the Victorian Railways, drawing inspiration from American themes. The Coach House was built through 1968-1972 using recycled building materials as accommodation for volunteers who would help reconstruct and operate the new tramway.

Later, Kain also purchased some 60 lb/yd (30 kg/m) rails, a TACL and abandoned former NQ trucks from Erica, van 8NU from Moyhu, and a second, Fowler steam locomotive from Mount Morgan, Queensland which had originally worked on the Big Pats Creek Tramway in Warburton, Victoria. The engine John Benn was restored to operating condition in late 1973, being heavily rebuilt to an American-style 2-4-2ST arrangement with saddle tank and large wooden pilot, painted blue and renamed Helen.

Trains operated in Walhalla yard and along the former run-away siding at the Up end of Walhalla station from 1974 to 1981; the intention was to continue restoring the line towards Thomson, but the damaged Stringers Creek trestle bridges were never repaired.

Interpersonal conflicts led to the group gradually disbanding. The engine was moved on in 1977, and the Tramway closed for good in 1982, with all the rolling stock sold to Colin Rees of the CRT Group. All the remaining railway assets were sold in 1983. The locomotive has since been repainted red and is now named J. C. Rees. As of 2009 it worked on the Puffing Billy Railway, making use of its larger cab for Footplate Experience Trains between Emerald and Cockatoo, while the NU van's body was sighted on the underframe of 110NQR at Emerald in November 1997, and it was registered as "untrafficable" on the Railway's books as of 1 November 2009. It is not clear which NQ wagons were taken from Erica or where they ended up after the W&TRST ceased operating, but it is at least probable that some made it to the Puffing Billy Railway; particularly as some that were listed by that Railway as Off Register or Untrafficable, as of 2009, can be matched to either the wagons sold from Moe station to the Forests Commission in September 1954, or to wagons sold to unidentified buyers the following month; any of the wagons from either of those batches could have potentially continued on to the W&TRST, and from there to the Puffing Billy Railway.

A handful of buildings from the W&TRST era still exist in Walhalla, following preservation efforts in the late 1970s, a short-lived gold mining project in the 1980s, and the arrival of electricity to the town in 1998. The former Cook's Cottage hotel has been renamed a few times and as of 2012 was operating as The Coach House.

== Walhalla Goldfields Railway project ==
Following the end of the W&TRST project in 1982 some members of the group retained property interests in Walhalla, and would occasionally discuss the concept of "talking about doing it again". In 1989 these discussions coincided with interest from another resident and former member of the Tramway, and discussions included "what not to do", having learned from the experiences of the Kain project. One of the lessons was that the new venture had to start from Thomson station instead of Walhalla.

The Walhalla Railway Taskforce formed on 1 December 1991. Money was available because Walhalla was in a marginal Federal electorate. Consideration was given to building the line to either 2 ft (610 mm) or 900 mm (2 ft 11 7/16 in) (the latter matching the former State Electricity Commission's system in Yallourn, which had closed in 1984), but the preference was to retain the original 2 ft 6 in (762 mm). The State Electricity Commission (SEC) was privatised in the early to mid 1990s, devastating the economy of the Gippsland region, so grants were easily obtainable for any project that would reverse the trend. Multiple grants were awarded to the fledgling railway, on the proviso of dollar-for-dollar matching. The Walhalla Goldfields Railway was incorporated on 22 October 1992 and restoration work began the following January. The former roadbed was overgrown with blackberries and heavy scrub, with numerous sections of the trackbed collapsed and all the bridges either derelict or in ruinous condition. Restoration began with the establishment of Thomson Station and its accompanying yard, on the site and to the south of the original station.

=== Early operations and intermediate stops ===
The first track was laid in February 1994, using 60 lb/yd (30 kg/m) rails acquired from New South Wales and the Mallee region, transported by train to Morwell railway station. Thirty former SEC employees were made available, in theory to help clear vegetation from the line, but the Railway made better use of their skills by having them construct the Thomson locomotive depot, restore the Fowler engine, and convert former SEC coal wagon underframes to new passenger rollingstock. The railway commenced operations on 10 April 1994, within the Thomson station yard, only three days after the Fowler had been delivered. Gradually the line progressed, first over the nationally-heritage-classified Thomson River Bridge in October 1994, pushing up the Stringers Creek Gorge towards Happy Creek.

As the line was extended intermediate temporary stations were established. The first was Winter Platform, in service from June 1995 to June 1996; it closed when the line was extended to Cascade Bridge Halt. This second temporary terminus was in service from 7 September 1996 until 28 March 1997. The preserved line reached Happy Creek on 1 April 1997 where the preserved line terminated pending reconstruction of the plethora of bridges between there and Walhalla proper in 2002. (Note: Enthusiast site Vicsig says Cascade Halt opened 13 October 1997 and closed 26 October 1998; and Happy Creek Loop and Halt opened 27 March 1998, but these statements are not referenced. A photo is also available at the latter source showing a small galvanised iron passenger shelter at Happy Creek Halt in 2007, though it is not clear whether or not the station was still in use at that time.) The first train arrived into Happy Creek on 27 March 1997. The new station had been built with a loop siding to enable the locomotive to change ends, instead of having to push the train one way and pull it the other. This became the terminus until the six bridges in the last kilometre into the Walhalla Station yard were completed.

=== Continuation to Walhalla ===
Work to extend the line back to Walhalla continued. A steel bridge span was obtained from the Puffing Billy Railway at Emerald, where it had been stored after removal from the Warburton railway line in the 1970s, and the line re-opened on 13 March 2002 with a total operating length of line 4 km. Later, a replica Walhalla station building was constructed by students at Yallourn TAFE, using the original drawings, and was transported to the railway yard in two halves for assembly on-site. Because of a road realignment in the 1960s, the new station building had to be sited opposite to the location of the original one.

=== Rockfalls and Bushfires ===
Shortly after the railway opened, on 24 May 2002 a rockfall on Walhalla Road through Stringers Gorge blocked the road completely, and for ten days the train was the only connection between Walhalla and the rest of the state. VicRoads chartered the train service for four return trips per day which helped to support the railway financially, but significantly drained the volunteers' energy.

Due to bushfires in the nearby mountains, services on the railway were suspended as from the weekend of 9 December 2006. By 18 December 2006, fires reached the outskirts of Walhalla, and on 22 December 2006 the three-span trestle bridge (Bridge No.7), adjacent to the former temporary terminus Cascade Bridge Halt, was destroyed. Services resumed between Walhalla and Happy Creek on 31 December 2006.

On 10 March 2007, the Victorian State Government announced funding of A$195,000 to rebuild the destroyed bridge, and to repair and upgrade the track. The bridge was restored in early April 2007 and normal operations between Thomson and Walhalla recommenced on Saturday 7 April.

In 2000 the railway carried 19,000 passengers; by 2010 with the restoration to Walhalla this had increased to 34,000.

=== Recent additions ===
In late 2014, the Walhalla station saw the addition of a verandah to complete the original appearance of the station. In more recent times, the WGR has adopted a much lower focus on heritage and its newer buildings (particularly at Thomson) are contemporary design and materials.

In November 2015, the Walhalla Goldfields Railway signed a twinning agreement with the Lynton and Barnstaple Railway in England. This agreement came about due to the similar nature of the railways and to foster cooperation and volunteer exchanges.

A crew lunch room was added at Walhalla in 2021 using a portable building provided by the Daylesford Spa Country Railway from Bullarto railway station on their line.

== Rollingstock ==
The railway does not have access to any original rollingstock from when the line was operated by the Victorian Railways (as most of the remaining stock is now with the Puffing Billy Railway near Melbourne). However, a variety of locomotives have been used on the line, and new carriages have been custom-built for the Railway. The collection is a significant piece of industrial railway history, and the WGR provides a valuable tourist draw for the regional economy.

Following experience with 103 Spirit of Baw Baw, the inherent costs of steam operation make it unclear whether the WGR will ever have a permanent steam fleet.

=== Locomotives ===
Number	Name	Image	Wheel arrangement	Year built	Builder	Notes
1001	Spirit of Emu Bay		B-B	1963	Walkers, Maryborough, Queensland	Used on the Emu Bay Railway in Tasmania, sold to Tasrail in 1998. In storage from 2000, then sold to WGR in April 2001. Regauged from 3 ft 6 in (1,067 mm) and fitted with Westinghouse air brake equipment in 2004. The "Big Diesel", weighing 42 long tons (43 t), it has a 250 horsepower (190 kW) Deutz AG V12 engine and is easily capable of hauling all four of the WGR's passenger carriages.
14	Spirit of Yallourn		0-6-0DH	1951	Fowler, England	Built with a 150 horsepower (110 kW) Caterpillar Inc. engine for the Interconnecting Railway between Yallourn and Morwell to a track gauge of 900 mm (2 ft 11 7/16 in), this engine was donated to the WGR in 1994 and regauged. It is capable of hauling three carriages.
030	Kasey		0-4-0DH	1970	E.M. Baldwin & Sons, Castle Hill, New South Wales	Used by the Melbourne and Metropolitan Board of Works in the 1970s and 1980s on the Thomson Dam construction project. Later passed to Coal Creek Historical Park in Korumburra, but suffered engine failure. Acquired by WGR, extensively rebuilt, and arrived Thomson July 1998. Has a 250 horsepower (190 kW) engine, but only capable of hauling two coaches. Used on quiet days or as a backup for the Spirit of Yallourn.
103	Spirit of Baw Baw		0-6-0T	1956	Henschel & Son, Kassel, Germany	Originally from Thailand and built to 750 mm (2 ft 5 1/2 in), this engine passed through several owners and was imported to Australia in 1982. By July 2001 it had been regauged and was undergoing trials at Thomson. Operated trains between 2002–2006. The first steam engine to return to Walhalla on 23 July 2004, it was not commercially successful because it struggled to haul three carriages and needed assistance from a bank engine. It is now stored in Dalby, Queensland by its owner, along with sibling engine 104.
7A			2-6-2T	1905	Newport Workshops	As part of the celebrations for the railway's centenary, the Puffing Billy Railway loaned steam locomotive 7A (which ran on the original line) for special public operations on the weekend of 29-30 May 2010, sometimes with its own identity and other times wearing the plates of classmate 9A. 7A is last believed to have operated through to Walhalla in November 1936. However, the inherent costs of steam operation make it unclear whether the WGR will ever have a permanent steam fleet.
DH37			B-B	1969	Walkers Limited, Maryborough	Acquired from Queensland Rail in November 2010, now stored in Walhalla yard pending conversion to 2 ft 6 in (762 mm), similar to the Puffing Billy Railway's diesel locomotives DH5 and DH59. Was previously on a short length of 3 ft 6 in (1,067 mm) track in Walhalla yard, now raised on jacks with bogies removed.
DH72			B-B	1974	Walkers Limited, Maryborough	Acquired in June 2012 from Mackay, Queensland along with a range of spare parts; stored pending funding for gauge conversion. The two DH engines are expected to form the core of the fleet when the railway is extended back to Erica.

=== Carriages ===
Passenger rolling stock on the WGR was constructed using the frames and bogies from coal wagons from the closed 900 mm (2 ft 11 7/16 in) narrow gauge Interconnecting Railway between Yallourn and Morwell, about 40 kilometres (25 mi) south of Walhalla. The carriages were built to designs keeping compatibility with Puffing Billy Railway rolling stock in mind, so they share brake systems and coupler heights and types. While the line was in early restoration stages in the early to mid 1990s, a team of thirty former SEC employees converted former SEC coal wagon underframes to new passenger rollingstock. These were styled to be aesthetically similar to the Victorian Railways' NQR, NB and NBC passenger carriages, as still used today on the Puffing Billy Railway, though slightly longer and wider to fit the available frames. Four carriages were built - 1NQRW, 1NBW, 2NBW and 1NBCW.

In 2015 a pair of old Melbourne trams were acquired with a view to creating a diesel-powered, narrow gauge railmotor set, to reduce operational costs and enable daily operation with reduced crew costs. The project was anticipated at the time to take two years and A$300,000 to complete.

Number	Name	Image	Wheel arrangement	Year built	Builder	Notes
X1.461				1926	Melbourne & Metropolitan Tramways Board	Acquired in late 2015, to be rebuilt as a diesel railmotor. Will have capacity for 28 seated passengers and 1 wheelchair.
X1.463				1926	Melbourne & Metropolitan Tramways Board	Per X1 461. X1 463 was acquired in poorer condition than X1 461, so it is likely to be the trailing unit of the railmotor set.
1NQRW			2 bogies	1994	WGR	One wagon was fitted out with a framework for supporting a temporary roof, similar to the original sheltered NQR design. In 2016 the wagon was remodelled and fitted with end-of-train equipment, allowing it to be substituted for the NBCW when necessary.
1NBW			2 bogies	1994	WGR	Seats 36 passengers.
2NBW			2 bogies	1994	WGR	Seats 36 passengers.
1NBCW	Gooding		2 bogies	1994	WGR	Seats 16 passengers and has a guard's compartment at the south end.

The WGR also has an assortment of track machines, ballast wagons and other gear.

== Future expansion plans ==
The WGR is planning to extend the line to Erica, where the railway's permanent workshop complex will be built. Engineering assessments and a business plan have now been completed.

The first stage would extend through Platina to the site of O'Shea & Bennett's Siding at the junction of Boola Rd and the Walhalla Tourist Road. This section will require the reconstruction of two trestle bridges between Thomson and Platina, one of which has already been disassembled in preparation for this. Notably, Platina is on a steep downhill gradient towards Thomson and never included a run-around loop, while the Siding is on a relatively flat patch of land that did include a second parallel track.

Completing the extension from O'Shea & Bennett's Siding to Erica will require the re-excavation of the former cutting where Boola Road crossed the railway on a bridge; from 1975, the cutting was used as a municipal garbage dump by the Narracan Shire Council, then entirely filled in and the road rebuilt across the top. There is also a large trestle bridge which requires reconstruction across Jacobs Creek, shortly before Erica station.

The Baw Baw Shire Council considered in late 2007 selling a large section of the Erica station site to the caravan park operators currently leasing the site, which would retain only an 18-metre-wide easement for the eventual reconstruction of the station by the Walhalla Goldfields Railway. The in principle decision was later revoked but the caravan park is rated by Baw Baw Shire as more important locally than a future tourist railway terminus.

Reconstruction of the line from Erica to Moe would likely be impractical and uneconomical, as the original right of way was sold or used for road realignment in many places, and is partly covered by the waters of the Moondarra Reservoir.

== Engineering heritage award ==
The railway received an Engineering Heritage Marker from Engineers Australia as part of its Engineering Heritage Recognition Program.
