= Happy Creek railway station =

Railway station in Victoria, Australia

Happy Creek

General information
- Location: 170.69 km (106.06 mi) from Flinders Street
- System: Walhalla Goldfields Railway station
- Line: Walhalla

Other information
- Status: Tourist station

History
- Opened: 1 April 1997

Happy Creek is a railway station on the Walhalla narrow gauge line in Gippsland, Victoria, Australia. It was opened in 1997, for use as a temporary terminus during the re-construction of line between Thomson and Walhalla. It served as a terminus until early 2002, when the line to Walhalla was completed.

Preceding station	Heritage railways	Following station
Thomson	Walhalla Goldfields Railway	Walhalla
Entire line
