= Moondarra Rail Trail =

Rail trail in Victoria, Australia

Coordinates: 38°5′5″S 145°19′40″E

The Moondarra Rail Trail is a little-maintained, 7 km section of the former Walhalla Railway in Gippsland, Victoria. Located entirely within the Moondarra State Park, the surface is entirely dirt and partially overgrown.
