= Platina railway station =

Former railway station in Victoria, Australia

Coordinates: 37°58′30″S 146°25′5″E

Platina

General information
- Line: Walhalla
- Platforms: 1

Other information
- Status: Closed

History
- Opened: 3 May 1910
- Closed: 14 October 1952

Services
Preceding station	Disused railways	Following station
Murie	Walhalla line	Thomson
	List of closed railway stations in Victoria	
Location

Platina was a railway station on the Walhalla narrow gauge line in Gippsland, Victoria, Australia. The station was opened in 1910, and consisted of a passenger shed and a number of sidings. The Evans brothers built two lime kilns nearby in 1912, and had their own siding at the station, connected to the kilns by a tramway.

In 1944, the railway line between Platina and Walhalla was closed. The lime quarries and kilns ceased operating in 1951, which led to the closure of the Erica to Platina section of the railway the following year.

All that exists at the former site of Platina Station is a small shelter and a grassed picnic area. A road overbridge is located at the down end of the station site. The route of the line is now used by the Walhalla Goldfields Rail Trail.

The Walhalla Goldfields Railway has plans to extend the tourist railway to Platina and, eventually, to Erica.

== See also ==
- Walhalla Goldfields Railway
