= Walhalla railway station =

Railway station in Victoria, Australia

Coordinates: 37°57′2″S 146°26′57″E

Walhalla
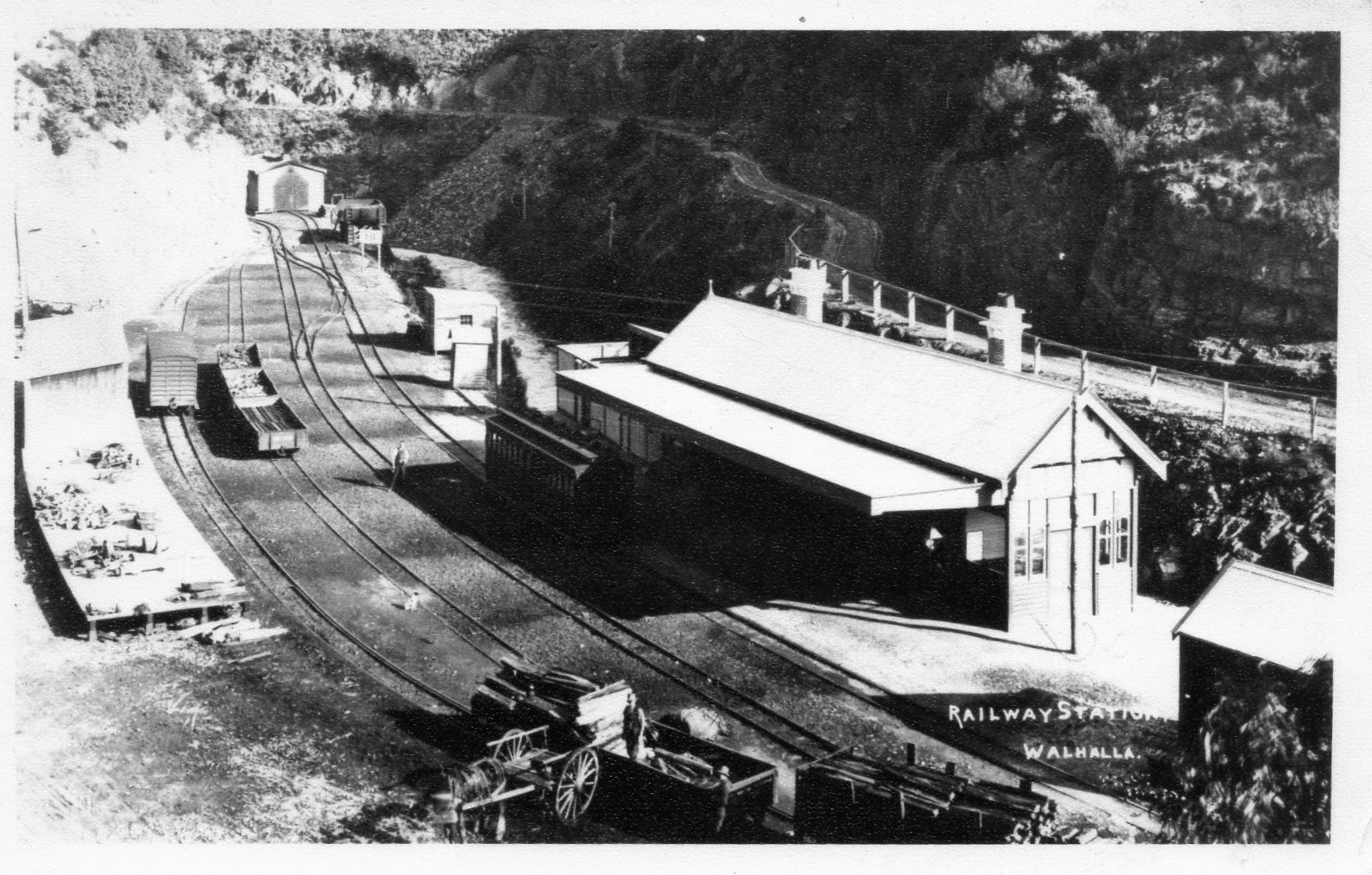
- Walhalla station yard, c.1910

General information
- Location: 171.94 km (106.84 mi) from Flinders Street
- System: Walhalla Goldfields Railway station
- Line: Walhalla
- Platforms: 1
- Tracks: 4

Other information
- Status: Tourist station

History
- Opened: 3 May 1910; 2002 (re-opened)
- Closed: 1 April 1944
Location

Walhalla was a railway station on the Walhalla narrow gauge line in Gippsland, Victoria, Australia. The station was originally built to serve the Gold Mine town of Walhalla. However, just three years after the line was opened the last gold mine in the town closed.

The section of the railway in Walhalla was considered to be a remarkable piece of engineering. The town is located in a very steep valley and, due to space restrictions, the station building was constructed over the creek.

In 1938, a few years before the station was closed, the station building was relocated to the Melbourne suburban station of Hartwell. The station was closed in April 1944, along with the section of the line from Walhalla to Platina.

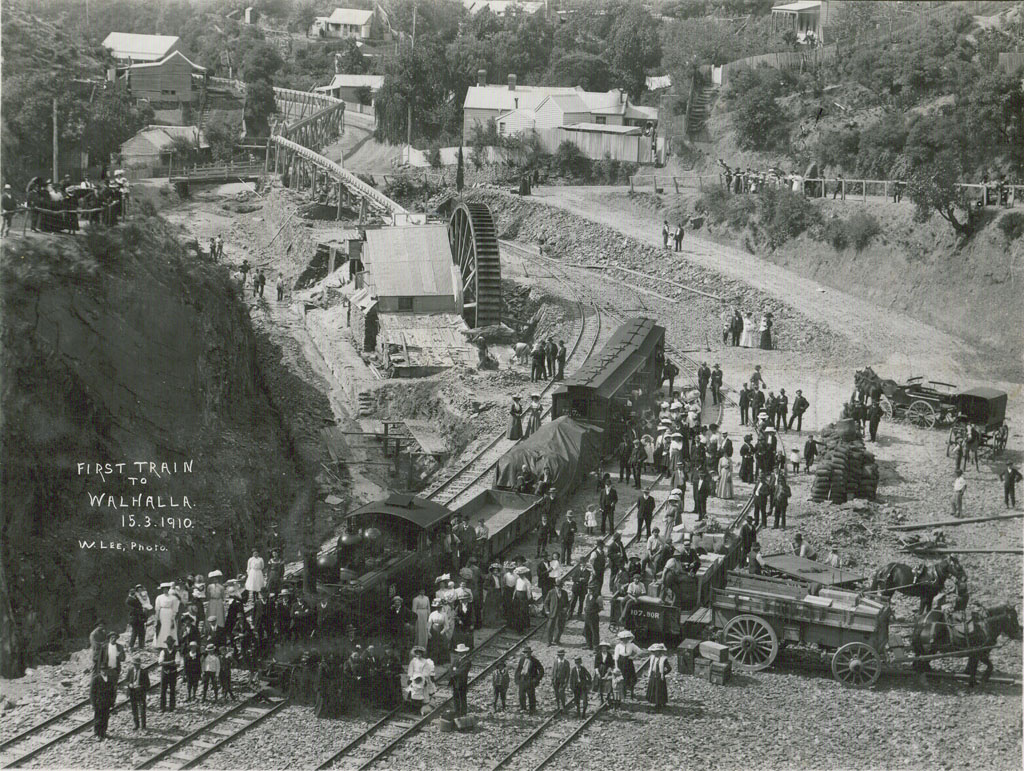
The first train to arrive at Walhalla 15 March 1910

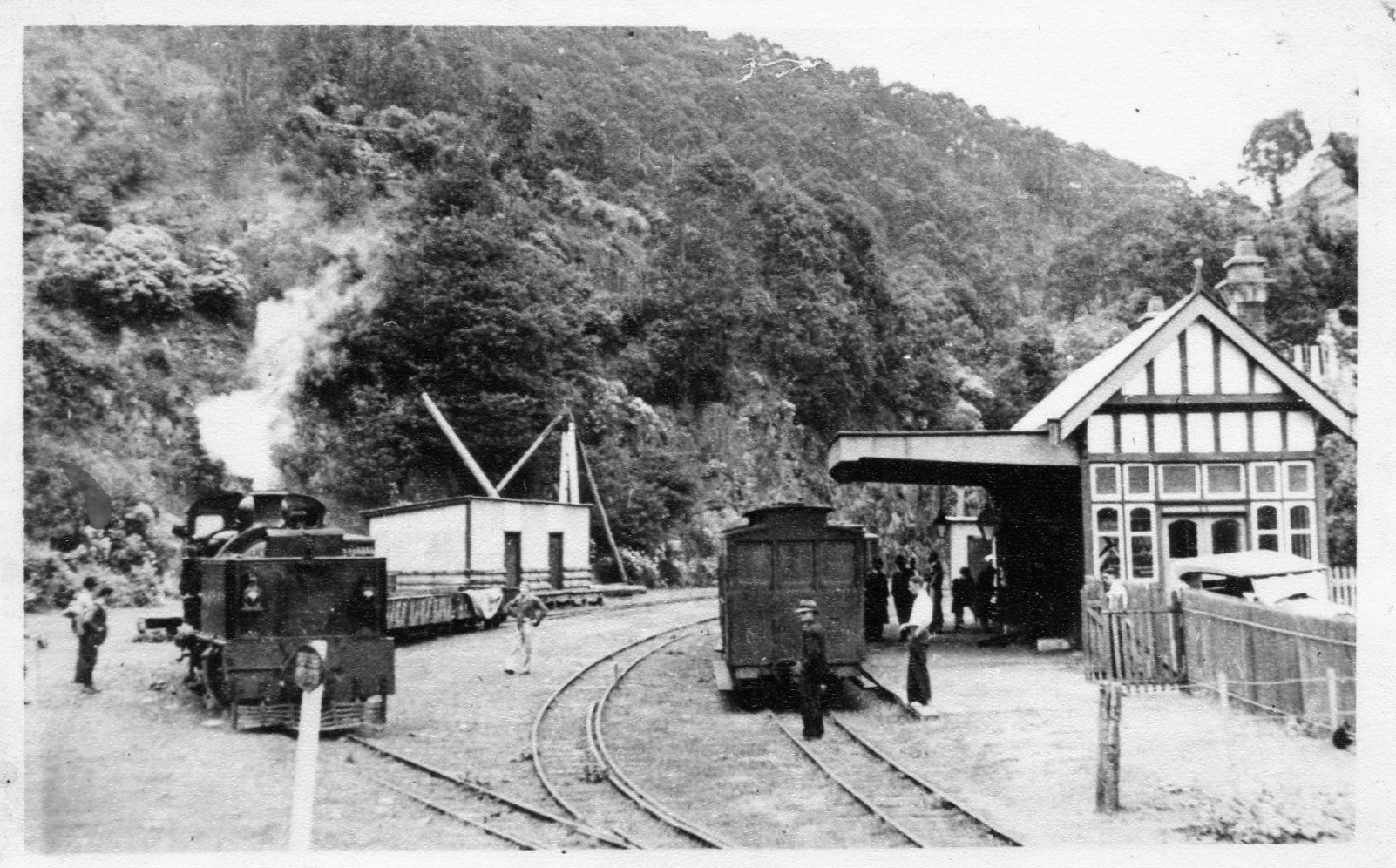
ca. 1926

| Preceding station | Heritage railways | Following station |
|---|---|---|
| Happy Creek | Walhalla Goldfields Railway | Terminus |
Entire line
