= Thomson railway station =

Railway station in Victoria, Australia

Coordinates: 37°57′36″S 146°25′9″E

Thomson
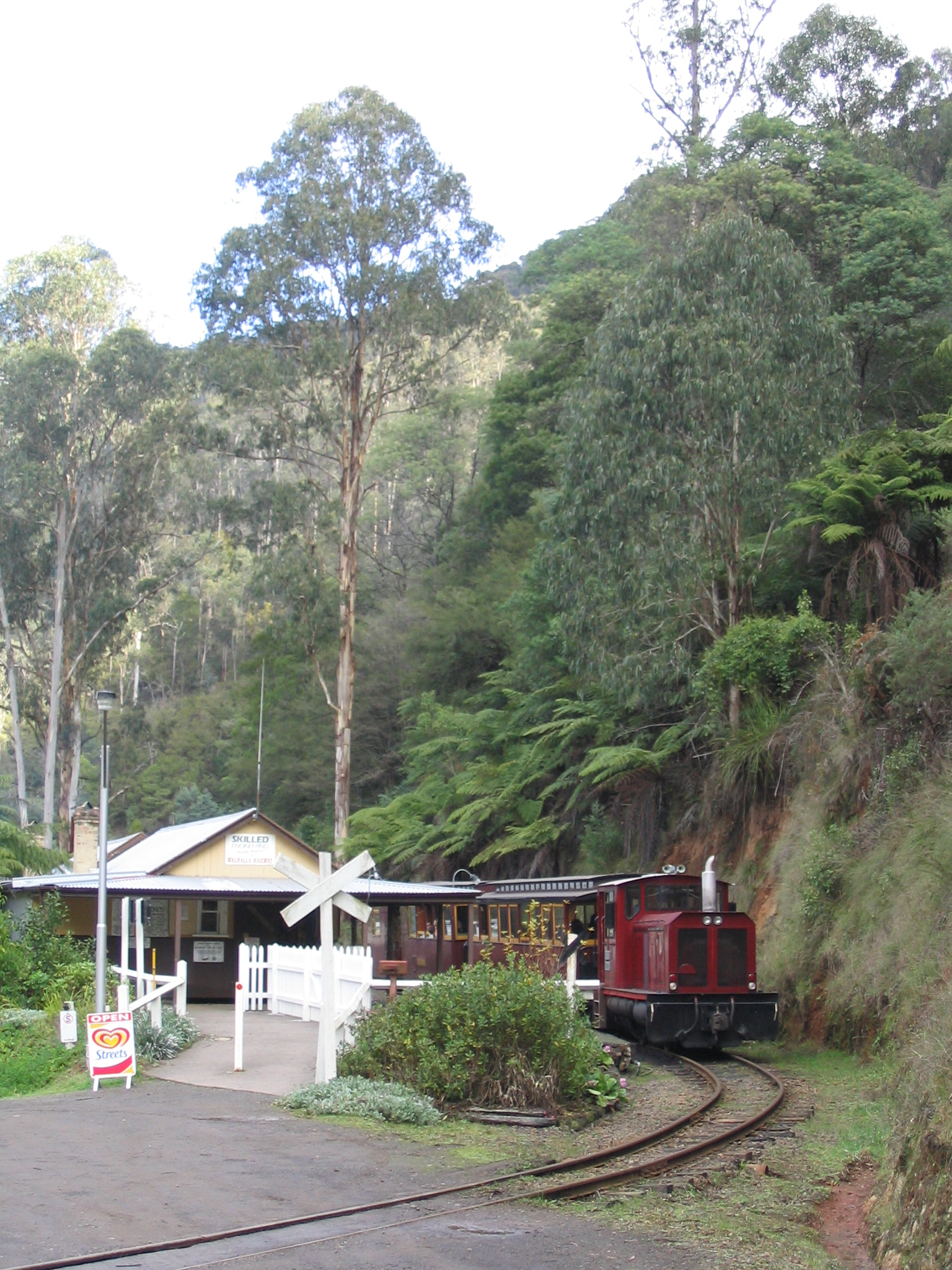

General information
- Location: 168.24 km (104.54 mi) from Flinders Street
- System: Walhalla Goldfields Railway station
- Line: Walhalla Goldfields
- Platforms: 1
- Tracks: 1

Other information
- Status: Tourist station

History
- Opened: 3 May 1910; 1995 (re-opened)
- Closed: 1 April 1944
Location

Thomson is a railway station on the Walhalla narrow gauge line in Gippsland, Victoria, Australia, located on the Up side of the bridge where the line crossed the Thomson River. The station was situated on the section of line closed in 1944.

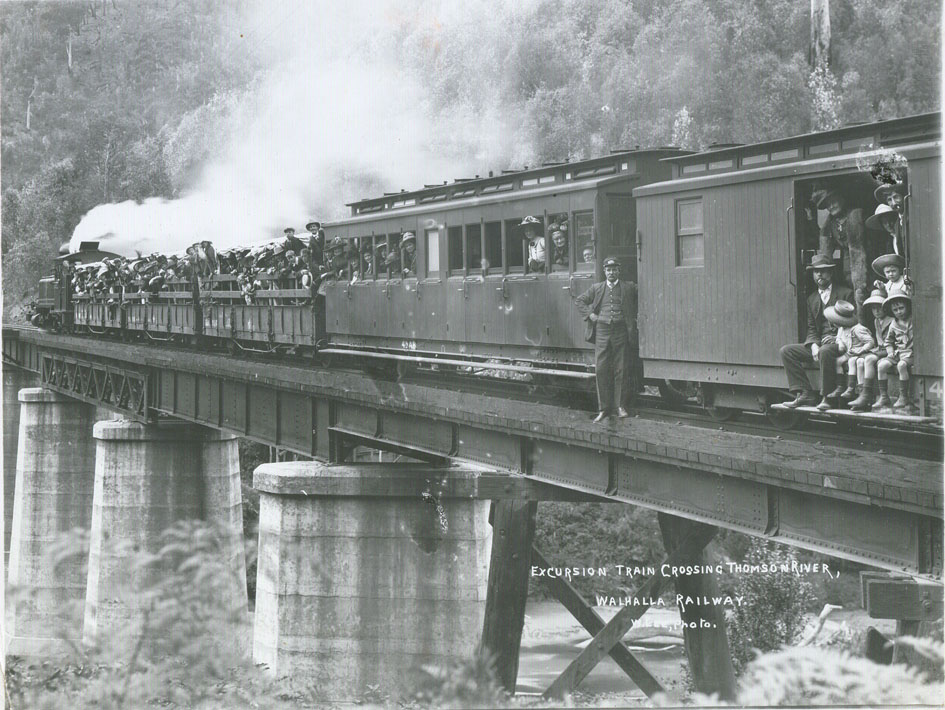
Train crossing the Thomson River bridge, c. 1910

The station was described as "just another nameboard" in 1927,, but it featured a thick tree had burned through, fallen over and speared into the ground across the railway giving a unique tourism attraction where locomotives passed under the log.

The station reopened in 1995, and is now the headquarters of the Walhalla Goldfields Railway. The platform and wooden station building had been reconstructed at Thomson for use by WGR tourist trains as a terminus.

A large bridge across the Thomson River is at the down end of the station. Two trestle bridges at the up end of the station have been dismantled in preparation for their restoration as part of a future extension of the railway to Erica.

Preceding station	Heritage railways	Following station
Platina	Walhalla Goldfields Railway	Happy Creek
Entire line
