= Moondarra State Park =

Protected area in Victoria, Australia

- IUCN category II (national park)
- Location within Victoria
- Location: Victoria
- Nearest city: Moe
- Coordinates: 38.045928°S 146.309738°E
- Area: 69.92 km^{2} (27.00 sq mi)
- Established: 1986
- Governing body: Parks Victoria
- Website: Official website

Moondarra State Park is on the northern edge of the Latrobe Valley, east of Melbourne, Australia. Proclaimed in 1986, it protects 6,992 hectares (17,280 acres) of native vegetation including silvertop, yertchuk, messmate and stringybark eucalyptus, native orchids, and banksias.

Camping and fires are permitted within the camp, in designated areas.

Part of the former route of the narrow gauge Walhalla railway line can be followed through the park, forming the Moondarra Rail Trail.
