= Yallourn 900 mm railway =

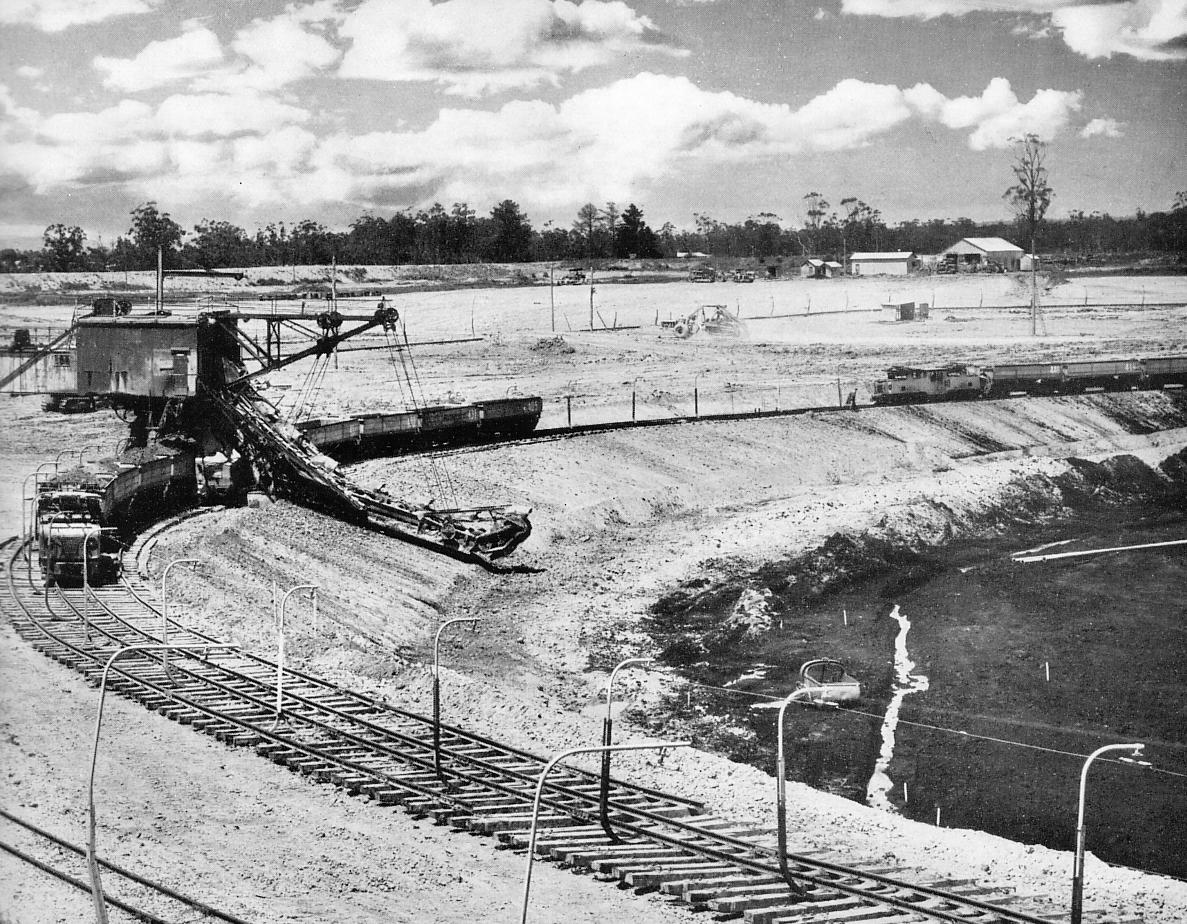
Trains being loaded with overburden in the open cut (1940s)

The Yallourn 900 mm railway was a 900 mm (2 ft 11 7/16 in) narrow gauge railway operated by the State Electricity Commission of Victoria in the Latrobe Valley of Victoria, Australia. The railway was built for the haulage of brown coal and overburden between the Yallourn open cut mine, briquette works, and power station. The Morwell Interconnecting Railway (ICR) was later constructed, linking the Yallourn mine complex with the Hazelwood open cut, briquette works, and power station.

== Operation ==
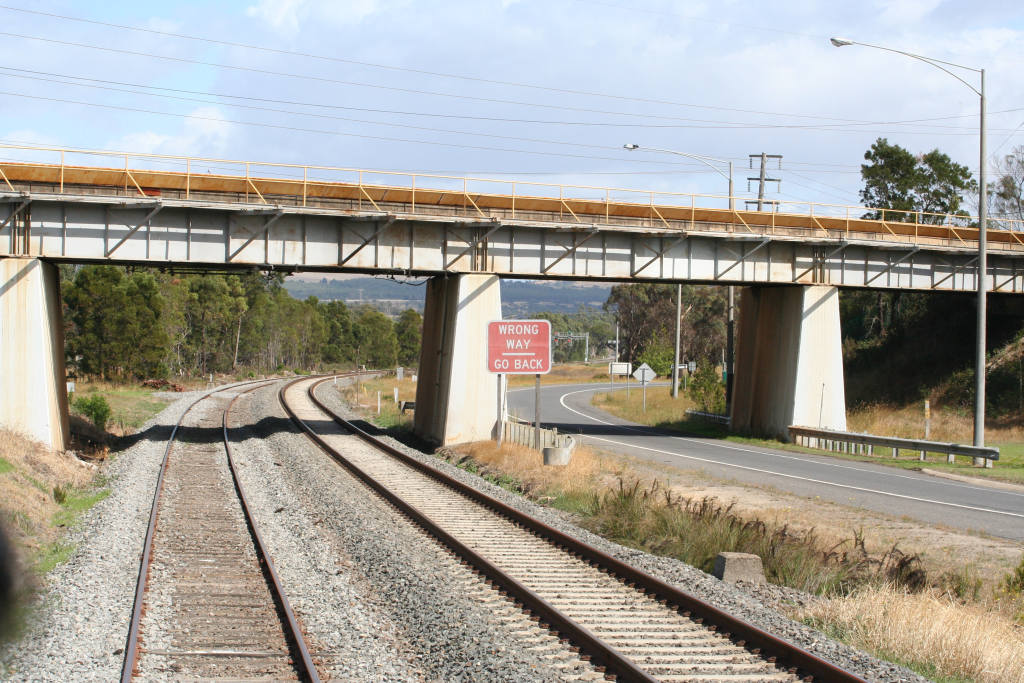
The interconnecting railway bridge crossing the Gippsland railway line and the Princes Drive exit on the west edge of Morwell

The network used overhead-wire electrification, and track in the open-cut mine was frequently moved using special track shifters. Locomotives were supplied by Henschel & Son, Siemens and Hitachi. Use of the electric locomotive declined in later years, with diesel locomotives used on the Interconnecting Railway in the 1990s.

The Yallourn railway commenced operation with the power station, being replaced by conveyor belts in 1984. The Morwell Interconnecting Railway opened with the Hazelwood complex, and crossed the Gippsland railway line by an overpass to the West of Morwell. The ICR was replaced by diesel locomotive haulage in 1993, with railway operations ending in October 2000 and the track was lifted between September and December 2001. A number of wagons from the railway after closure were acquired by the Walhalla Goldfields Railway and regauged for their use. A locomotive and coal wagon from the line are preserved at the Newport Railway Museum.

== Gallery ==
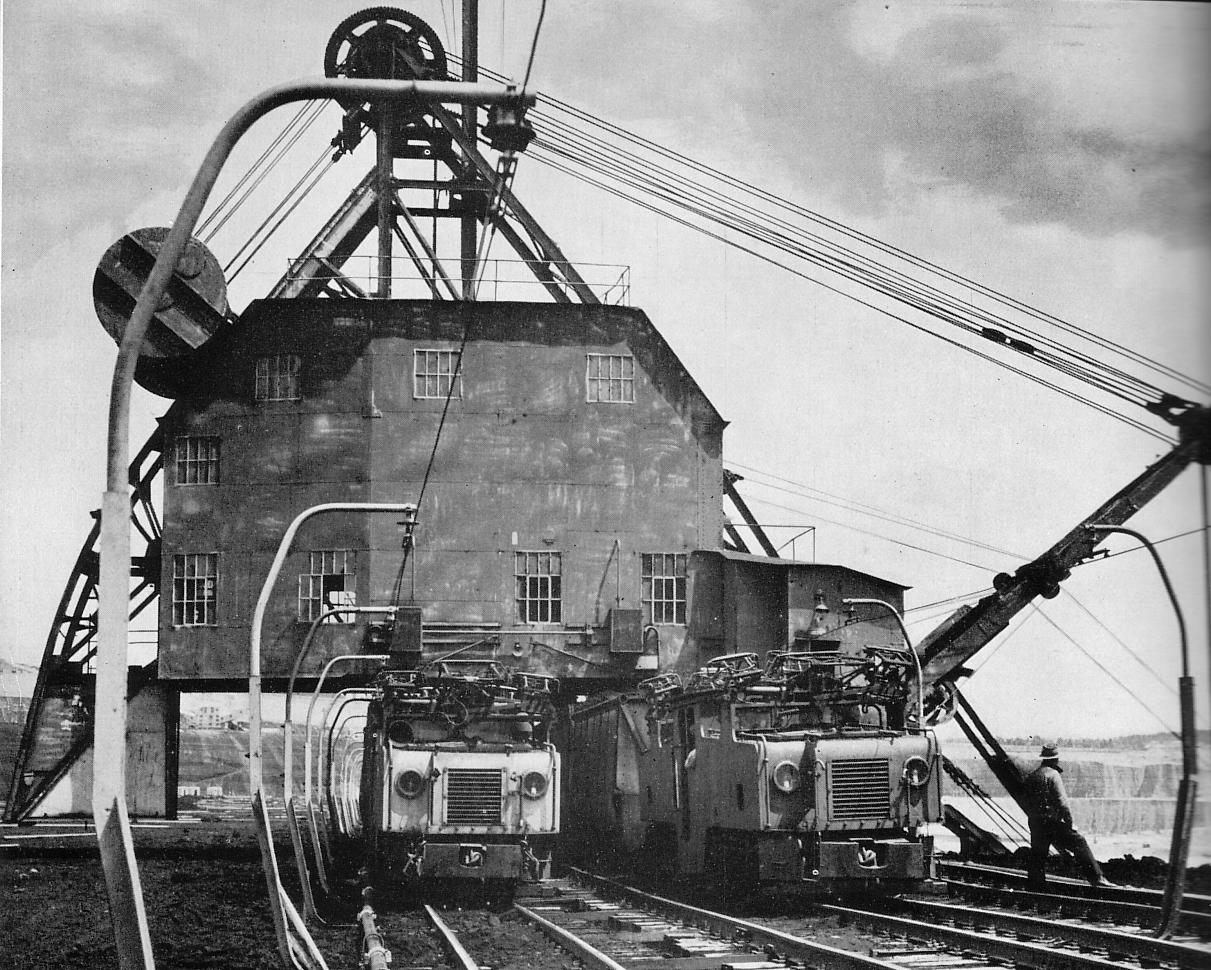
Trains being loaded by a coal dredge in the open cut.

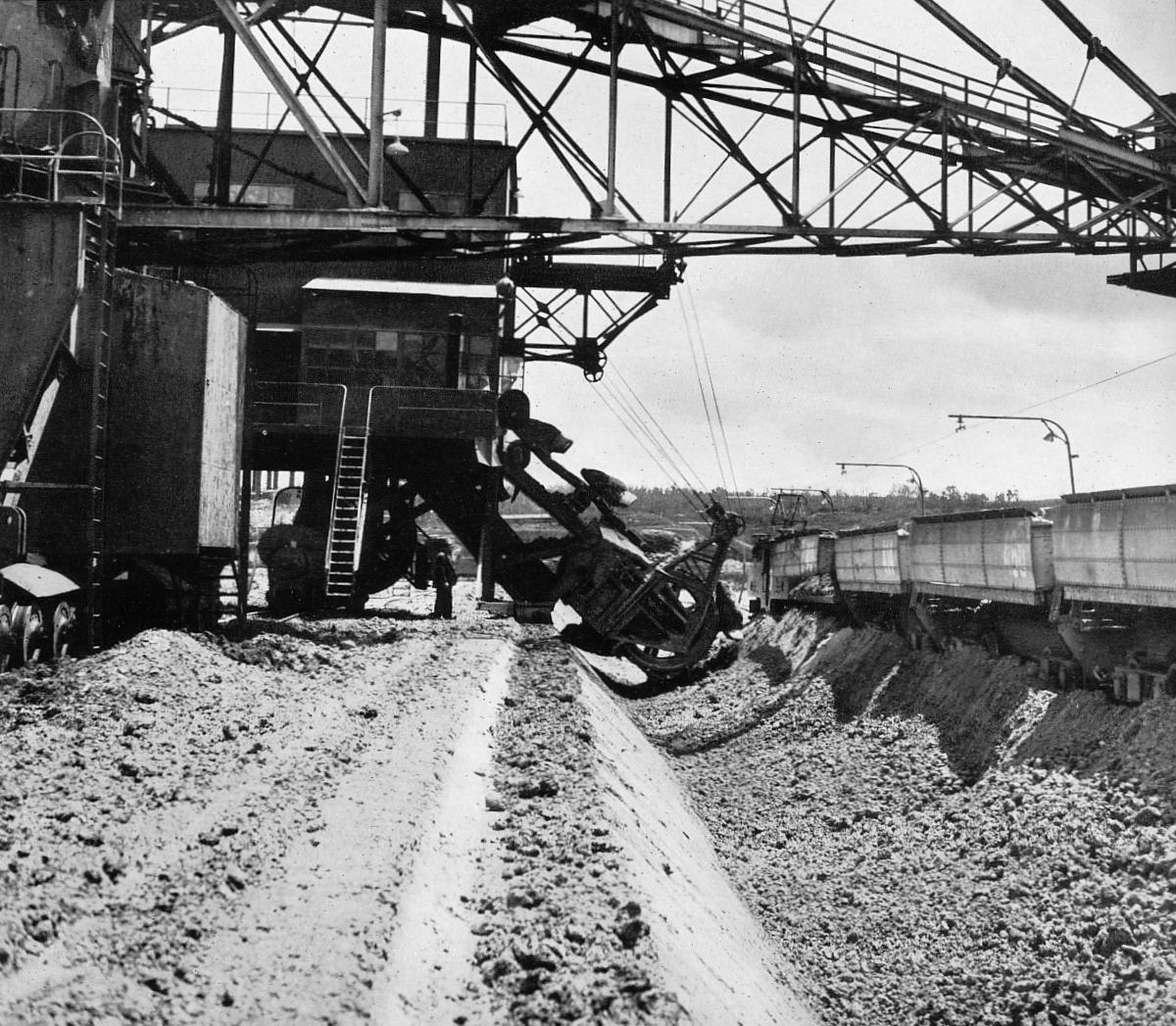
Loaded wagons dumping overburden

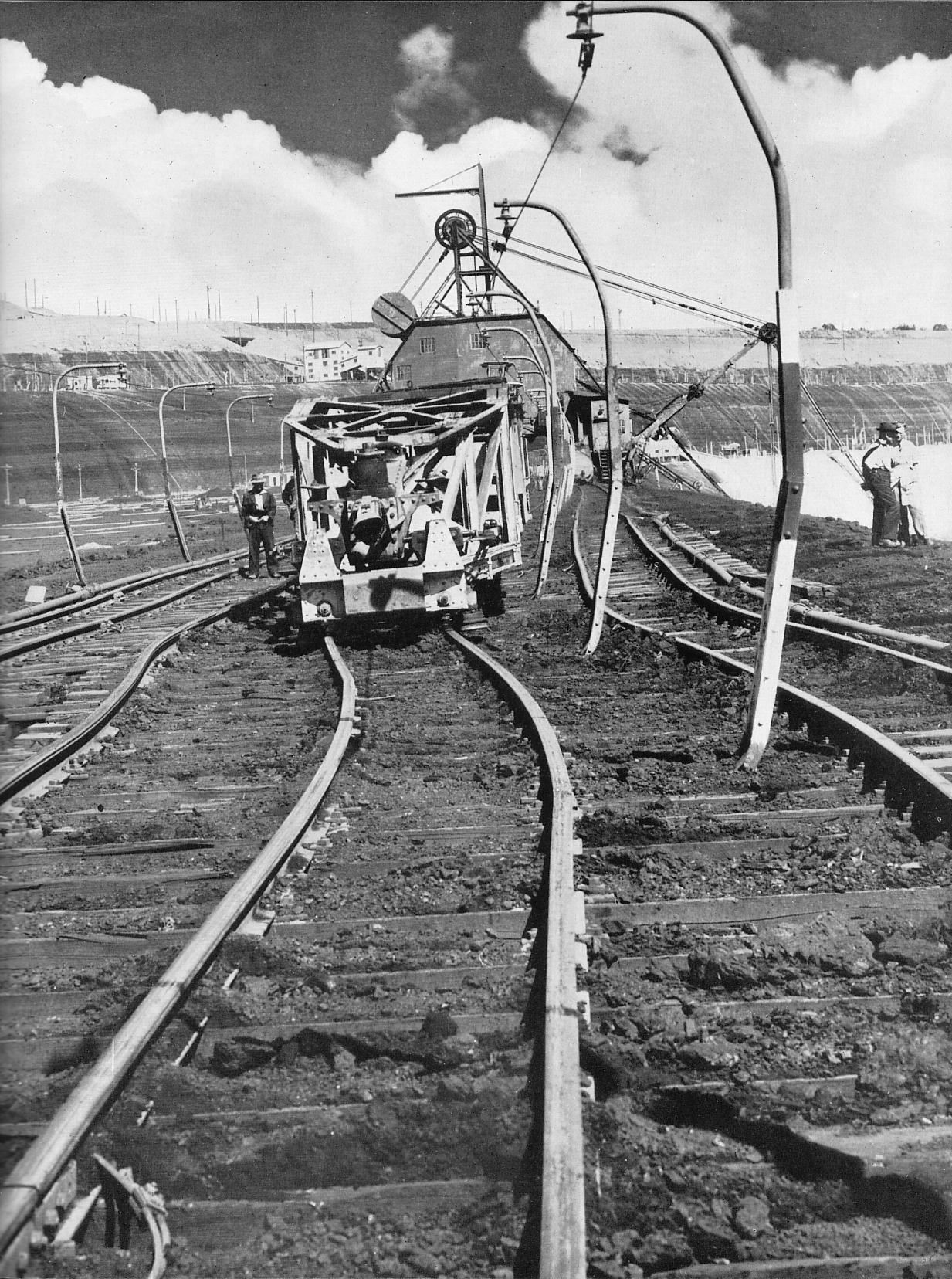
Special wagon used for moving track in the mine

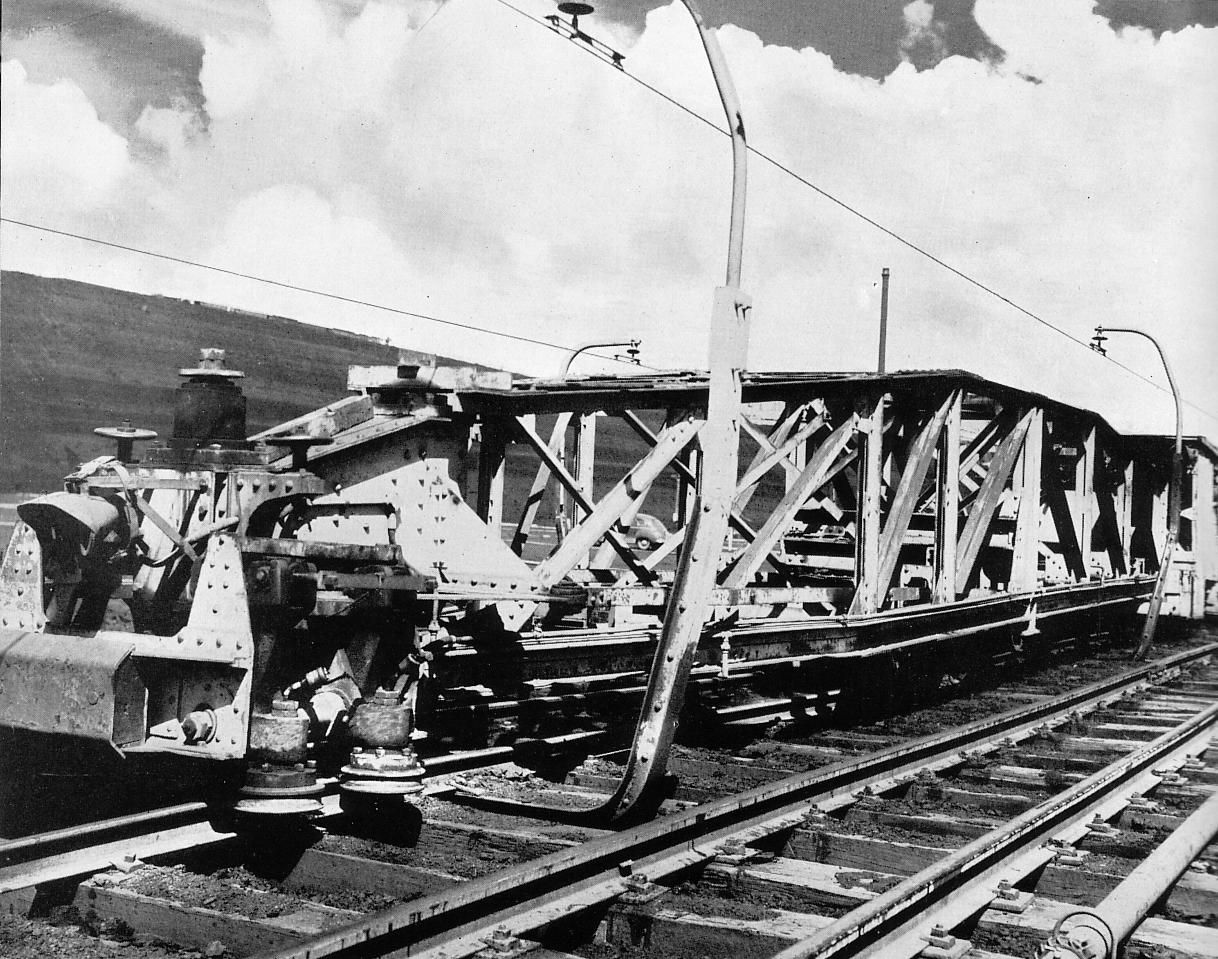
Special wagon used for moving track in the mine

== See also ==
- Yallourn railway line
