= Frederick Charles Porter =

Australian miner and explorer

Frederick Charles Porter (1832–1869) was an Australian miner and explorer of the Gippsland region of Victoria. His exploration work in early 1862 was critical in helping open up the Jordan goldfields.

== Biography ==
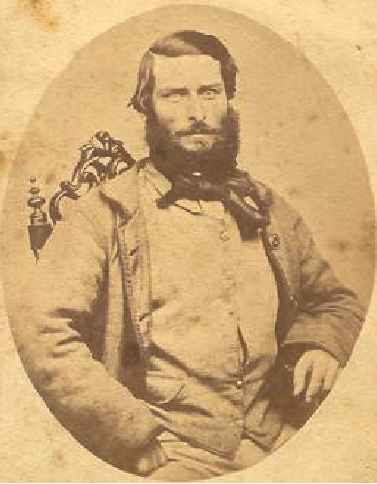
Frederick Charles Porter, c. 1865

Frederick Porter (known as 'Fred') was born in 1832 in Queenborough, Kent, England. He migrated to Australia as a child with his family, arriving in Adelaide on the Dumfries in 1839. His father, George Porter, and his uncle, William Porter, were sea captains, who settled in Australia and New Zealand. He first worked as a baker in Hindmarsh. Porter married Eliza Kimpton in 1854, with whom he had seven children. After the death of their second child in 1857, the Porters travelled overland to the Victorian goldfields. The family first appears at the Forest Creek diggings in 1859, before settling at Stratford, north of Sale in Gippsland.

By 1862, Porter had developed a good knowledge of the region. When a group of Sale businessmen raised a reward through public subscription of £80 to open up a track from Sale to supply the Jordan goldfields, Porter led three expeditions in the hope of claiming the reward. Before a supply route from Sale was established, provisions for the miners at the Jordan River were carted infrequently from Melbourne through Jamieson and exorbitant prices were being charged. It was feared that the diggings would close down over the winter months, unless a secure and closer supply route could be found.

Porter's first expedition included the Prussian-born, Henry Buhrow and was completed in May 1862. In mid-1862 Porter led a second party of seven men to test the value of his track and to bring the first supplies from Sale to the Jordan miners. This party was composed of Fred Porter, Percy Lloyd, William Thomas, Jack 'Nob' Belcher, Louis Armstrong and two unknown men. Shortly afterwards, Porter led a third expedition to bring further provisions to the miners and to prove the utility of his route.

Five claims were made for the reward. Albert Buntine originally said that he was the first to reach the Jordan from Sale, but he subsequently withdrew his claim in favour of Porter and Buhrow. Porter's route, which became known as 'Porter's Track', followed the upper reaches of the Macalister River then across Connor's Plains and along the ridges of the Black River district. Three other tracks took the high ground between the Thomson and Aberfeldy Rivers. These were made by Thomas McEvoy, Archie Campbell and William Anderson. The sources suggest that Porter's Track was the first to be cut and quickly became the one preferred by the miners and carters from Sale travelling to and from the Jordan diggings. At a meeting held at the Royal Exchange in Sale on 21 July 1862, the reward committee announced that amounts of £20 would be awarded to each of the four claimants and that a further £30 would be given to the man, whose track proved to be the most popular. It was Thomas McEvoy's track, which became the favoured route used to the diggings and won the final reward. The winter weather had made Porter's Track harder to traverse. As a result, it soon fell out of use, although a modern road through Licola still follows its path. In recognition of the efforts of the men, who cut the early tracks through to the Jordan diggings, William Pearson, a member of the Victorian Parliament, presented a petition of 700 signatures seeking further financial recognition for McEvoy, Porter and Campbell, who had done so much to open up the Gippsland goldfields. But John Steavenson, the Victorian Commissioner of Roads and Bridges was unmoved, despite having awarded around £500 of public moneys in grants to individuals for Melbourne-based routes.

In late 1863, Fred and Eliza Porter settled near the Fulton's Creek and Donnelly's Creek alluvial goldfields. They purchased an inn, the Halfway House, near present-day Seaton. It was near here that their nine-year-old son, Jim Porter, discovered a substantial quartz-gold reef, which became known as 'Boy's Reef'. Fred Porter and others formed a company to mine the reef in January 1865.

After a long illness, Fred Porter died from pulmonary tuberculosis on 6 January 1869, aged 36. He is buried in a solitary grave on the Aberfeldy River near Walhalla. 'Porters Creek' is named after him near the site of his inn. It starts near Williamson Spur at an elevation of 895m and ends when it joins the Glenmaggie River.
