= Rainbow Creek =

Rainbow Creek may refer to:

- A branch of the Thomson River (Victoria) created by flooding in the 1950s, that led to the creation of the Independent State of Rainbow Creek, an Australian micronation of the 1970s and 1980s
- Rainbow Creek (Ohio)
- Rainbow Creek (Washington), source for Rainbow Falls (Chelan County)
