= The Big Culvert =

- Coordinates: 37°33′32″S 145°52′01″E
- Carries: Yarra Track
- Locale: Cambarville, Victoria, Australia

Characteristics
- Design: Arch culvert bridge
- Material: Granite and bluestone

History
- Designer: Clement Wilks
- Constructed by: George Koehler
- Construction end: c. 1870s

The Big Culvert is a substantial granite and bluestone arch culvert bridge on the historic Yarra Track near Cambarville, Victoria, Australia.

It was built in the 1870s as part of the improvements to the road from Melbourne to the Woods Point and Jordan Goldfields. It was probably designed by Clement Wilks who was also responsible for the design of the Wilks Creek Bridge near Marysville also on the "Yarra Track". This moss covered granite and bluestone arch was constructed by a German settlor, George Koehler, who operated a hotel nearby.

The bridge is listed on the National Trust of Australia (Victoria) Register: B5804 and on the (now defunct) Register of the National Estate: Place 5720); and was previously listed on the Victorian Heritage Inventory.

== Bibliography ==
- Cumming, D.A. Some Public Works Engineers in Victoria in the Nineteenth Century Technology Report No. TR-85/10. August 1985.
- Thomas, Ann. Wilks Creek Bridge at Marysville, Victoria. 1993.
- Stacpoole, H. (Ed). Tracks to the Jordan. Lowden, Kilmore, 1973.
