= Coopers Creek, Victoria =

Coopers Creek
- Town
- Coordinates: 37°58′53″S 146°25′27″E
- Country: Australia
- State: Victoria
- LGA: Shire of Baw Baw
- Location: 4 km (2.5 mi) east-southeast of Erica; 5 km (3.1 mi) south-southwest of Walhalla; 25 km (16 mi) northwest of Traralgon; 130 km (81 mi) east-southeast of Melbourne
- Established: 1860s

Government
  - State electorate: Narracan
  - Federal division: Monash
- Elevation: 210 m (690 ft)
- Postcode: 3825

Coopers Creek is a locality and mine in the Gippsland region of Victoria, Australia. In the 1860s, Coopers Creek was settled during the Victorian gold rush and, throughout its history, gold, copper and lime have been mined there. Today, Coopers Creek is effectively limited to two camping sites, the first near the site of the mining town and the second to the east at Bruntons Bridge. Ruins from the locality's mining history, and the Copper Mine Hotel are all of the locality's history which survives. In August 2022, the 21 properties that comprise the town were listed for sale.

== Geography ==
Coopers Creek is in the Shire of Baw Baw in Victoria's Gippsland region. It is located in the Great Dividing Range, in the steep forested slopes of the Thomson River valley. The original township was located around the confluence of the Thomson River and Coopers Creek which is where mining operations were centred. The area gazetted as Coopers Creek is partially bounded by the Thomson River and by a number of roads in the area. It is partially within the Baw Baw National Park, the Erica State Forest and the Boola Boola State Forest. The area used for mining is now included in the Coopers Creek Copper Mine Historic and Cultural Features Reserve.

== History of industry ==
=== Mining ===
Alluvial gold from a copper, silver, gold and platinum deposit in the area was found in the Thomson River upstream of Coopers Creek resulted in a number of mining claims being made in the area during the Victorian gold rush. However, very little gold was actually discovered in Coopers Creek. It was the discovery of the first copper deposit in Victoria, in 1864, which led to the continued viability of township. Initial smelting conducted in Coopers Creek was unsuccessful and unprofitable due to lowered copper prices and the large quantity of firewood being consumed in the process.

A new source of copper was found in 1878 and led to the significant increase in mining infrastructure, including a new crushing mill, kilns and smelting furnaces, and an increase to 70 men being employed at the mine. By 1880, however, the copper found two years earlier had been exhausted and the mine fell into relative disuse for twenty to thirty years. The post office, opened twenty-five years earlier, closed on 11 September 1893.

Though attempts were made to begin mining at Coopers Creek in the late 1800s, it was not until 1910 that large-scale mining began again. Earlier wishes that the train line from Moe to Erica, around 8 kilometres (5.0 mi) by rail to the east, be extended to Coopers Creek were realised around 1910, with the Platina station on the Walhalla railway line being constructed at Coopers Creek. New leases were taken up by the Gippsland Copper and Platinum Mining and Smelting Company in around 1910 with the intention to bring new technology and increase the mining of copper at Coopers Creek.

The last gold mined from Happy-Go-Lucky was sold to the copper smelting works at Coopers Creek before its closure in 1915. The Walhalla mine closed around the same time. Operations at Coopers Creek ceased in 1915 following the pattern of mine closures in the area.

Mining operations returned to Coopers Creek in the 1960s, with the copper mine being cleared out and building of a new smelter being completed in 1969. The renewed mining operation was short lived, however, ending in 1971 due to the falling price of copper. The Long Tunnel Extended Mine at Walhalla was opened for tourism some years later, and a number of pieces of equipment and buildings were moved there from Coopers Creek.

=== Other industries ===
Following the collapse of the copper mining industry in the 1910s, lime instead became the main industry at Coopers Creek. There was a lime quarry, underground mine and kilns near the township in the late 1920s. Around this time accommodation in Coopers Creek consisted of four cottages, a bunk house and tents. Despite the closure of Walhalla's largest gold mine in the 1910s, the lime exports from Coopers Creek meant that the Walhalla railway line continued to operate regularly following a significant decline in rail traffic through the 1930s. Lime quarrying continued in Coopers Creek until 1952 when the last quarry closed.

Woodcutting had also been a major industry in the Coopers Creek area, mainly to support the mining operations by providing firewood and construction materials. This tree felling had a significant impact on the area, however, as, by the 1930s, there was such a shortage of trees that they needed to be felled in adjacent valleys. The 1939 Black Friday bushfires further devastated the Coopers Creek area and forced a large part of the population to move into larger towns and cities to seek employment.

== Township ==
The township of Coopers Creek was established in the 1860s around the copper mine and smelting works located around the confluence of the Thomson River and Coopers Creek and was described as having "a lively appearance" and that it had potential to become "a flourishing little place". The Copper Mine Hotel began operations during the 1860s to support the growing population with both accommodation and as a pub. The population of Coopers Creek was large enough, that, on 1 January 1868 a post office was opened in the town.

Around 1952, the Copper Mine Hotel (37.9846°S 146.4243°E) closed after around 100 years of operation from various locations around the township. The final building, apparently the only one left standing, became derelict and burnt down in 1999, leaving the original chimneys. It has since been rebuilt, maintaining its original design, but was closed to the public in 2007 and also includes a private two-bedroom residence.

In 2015, Coopers Creek consisted only of two campsites in addition to the unused pub buildings, the first near the location of the original township and mine and the second to the east of the original township at Bruntons Bridge. The Coopers Creek campsite is a popular camping site and includes a long drop toilet, picnic tables, a boat ramp as well as walking and four-wheel drive tracks. Ruins from the locality's mining history can also be found around the camping sites.

From around 1960 the Holyoak family, after staying at the Copper Mine Hotel, began purchasing titles of properties in the town. By 2022 the family had acquired all 21 property titles in the town which including the pub as well as open parkland. That year they listed for sale the 4.45 hectares (11.0 acres) of the town for between A$2,500,000 and A$3,000,000 with comparisons being made by Australian media to Canadian television sitcom Schitt's Creek.
