= Wilks Creek Bridge =

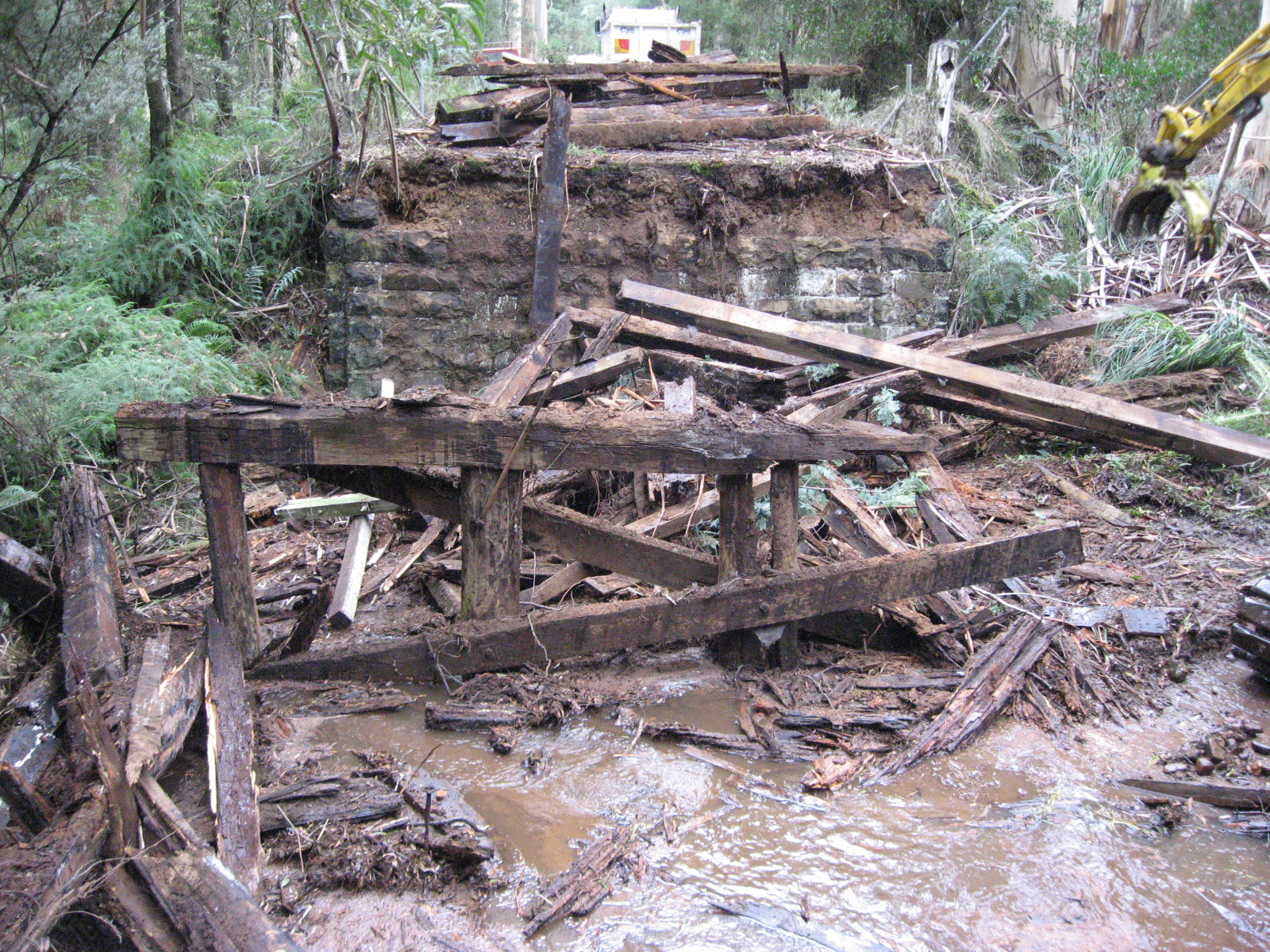
- Wilks Creek Bridge, during demolition in 2008
- Coordinates: 37°33′32″S 145°52′01″E
- Carries: Yarra Track (prior to bridge's demolition)

Characteristics
- Material: Timber and bluestone

History
- Designer: Clement Wilks
- Construction end: 1871
- Closed: 2008

Wilks Creek Bridge is a former timber and bluestone road bridge on the Yarra Track, located just off the Black Spur route, between Narbethong and Marysville, Victoria, Australia.

It was built in 1870 to the design of colonial Public Works Department engineer Clement Wilks as part of the construction of a new road to the Woods Point and Jordan Goldfields. Like many bridges of the period, it had a timber superstructure employing squared beams supported by struts and straining pieces, on cut bluestone abutments.

The bridge was remodelled around 1900 by engineer John Monash of the famous bridge-engineering firm of Monash and Anderson.

It was last used for heavy vehicular traffic in 1980 following the realignment of Marysville Road, and was left to decay until its demolishment in 2008. All timber traces of the bridge were destroyed in the 2009 Black Saturday fires. The handcrafted bluestone masonry wingwalls and abutments, especially shaped to receive timber struts, rate among the earliest of its kind surviving intact in Victoria.

== See also ==
- The Big Culvert
