= Cambarville =

- Town
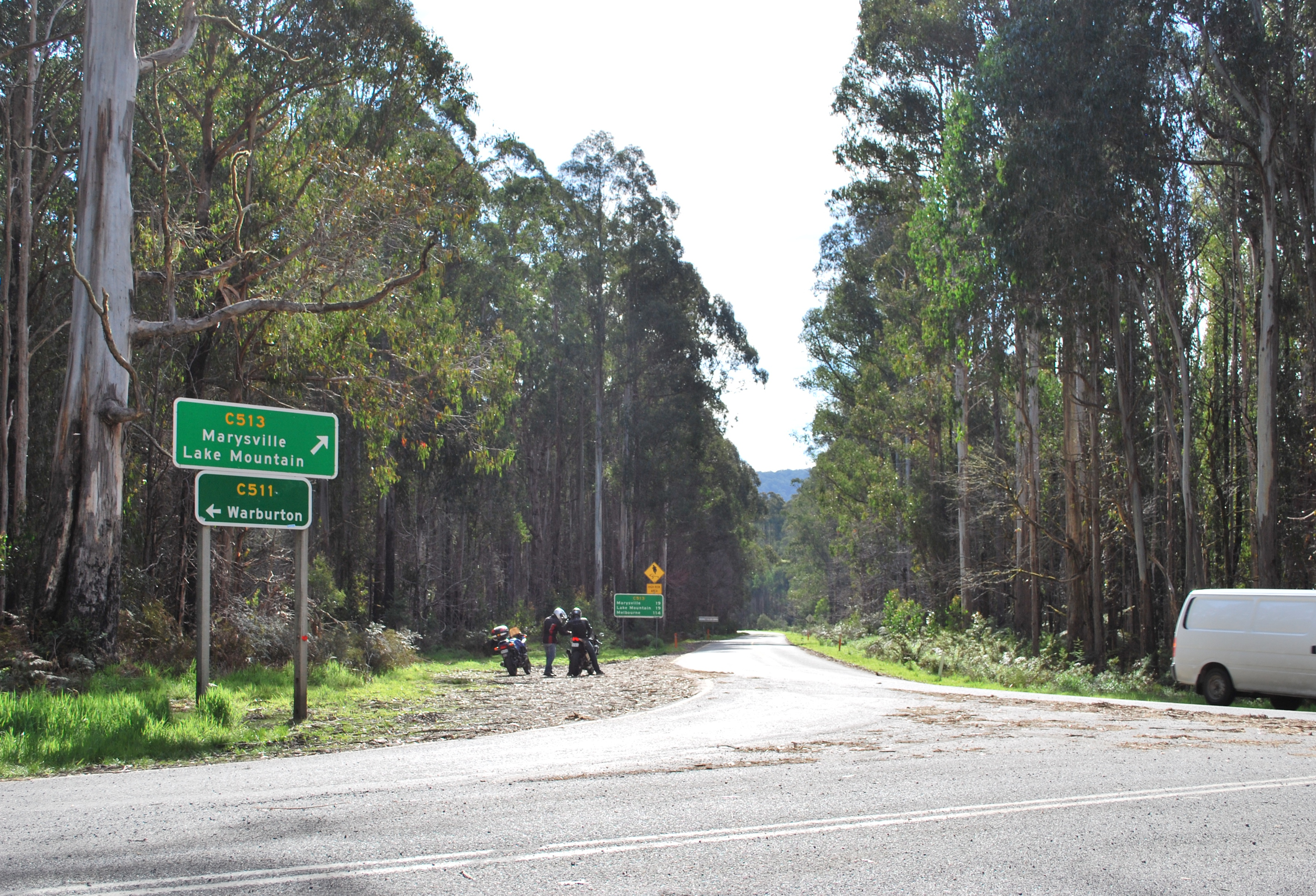
- Cumberland Junction - the intersection of roads leading to Warburton, Marysville and Woods Point

- Coordinates: 37°34′S 145°54′E
- Country: Australia
- State: Victoria
- LGA: Shire of Yarra Ranges

Government
  - State electorate: Eildon
  - Federal division: Casey

Population
  - Total: 0 (2021 census)
- Postcode: 3779

Cambarville is a locality in Victoria, Australia, located within the Shire of Yarra Ranges Local government area. Much of its area is part of the Yarra Ranges National Park.

It is notable for its giant mountain ash (Eucalyptus regnans) trees within the Cumberland Memorial Scenic Reserve, and relics from former sawmills and gold mining. The Big Culvert is located nearby on the Marysville - Woods Point Road, which was historically part of the Yarra Track.

== History ==
Cambarville was established as a timber mill town in the 1940s. Timber mill owners A Cameron and FJ Barton named Cambarville. They established the mill to salvage timber from trees destroyed in the 1939 bushfires.

It had a one-teacher primary school, which opened on 2 February 1943, closed in 1945 due to lack of pupils, re-opened again in 1946, and shut down for the last time in 1968. The main classroom was used as a community hub for various social activities, like plays, concerts, and dances. Life in Cambarville was said to be particularly difficult, with no access to luxuries like refrigeration and other electrical appliances. Single men were housed in huts provided by the logging company, and were provided with meals from a boarding house on Main Street (sometimes there were more itinerants and single men living in Cambarville than families with children). Main Street was never sealed during its heyday. The main saw mill was destroyed twice by fire, the last time in 1971. The town's population rapidly dwindled after the mill's closure. (All information gleaned from display boards dotted around Main Street, installed by Parks Victoria).

== Possum sightings ==
On the night of 3 April 1961, Eric Wilkinson, a keen, young naturalist, saw a Leadbeater's possum (Gymnobelideus leadbeateri) whilst conducting night surveys near Cambarville. A few hours later, he saw another one. The Museum of Victoria subsequently confirmed the authenticity of Eric Wilkinson's findings, which proved to be extraordinarily significant, considering that the last confirmed sighting of this elusive marsupial was documented back in 1909, and that the species had been declared extinct in 1921. In 1971, the Leadbeater's possum was proclaimed by the Victorian Government as the state's faunal emblem. A mountain ash tree was planted on Main Street, Cambarville, on 3 April 2011, to commemorate the 50th anniversary of the rediscovery of this much-sought after species. (All information derived from a metal plaque and display board installed by Parks Victoria in close proximity to the commemorative tree on Main Street).

== 2009 Black Saturday bushfires ==
Cambarville was impacted by the 2009 Black Saturday bushfires, and was the location of the death of the only firefighter killed during the fires. David Balfour, 47, from Gilmore, ACT, was killed on the night of 17 February when a burnt-out 50 m (160 ft) mountain ash tree fell on him while he was attaching a hose to a fire tanker.

== Bibliography ==
- Thomas, Ann. Wilks Creek Bridge at Marysville, Victoria. 1993.
- Stacpoole, H. (Ed). Tracks to the Jordan. Lowden, Kilmore, 1973.
