= James Frederick Porter =

Australian engineer and mine manager

James Frederick Porter (1855-1919) was an Australian engineer and mine manager of the Gippsland region of Victoria.

== Biography ==
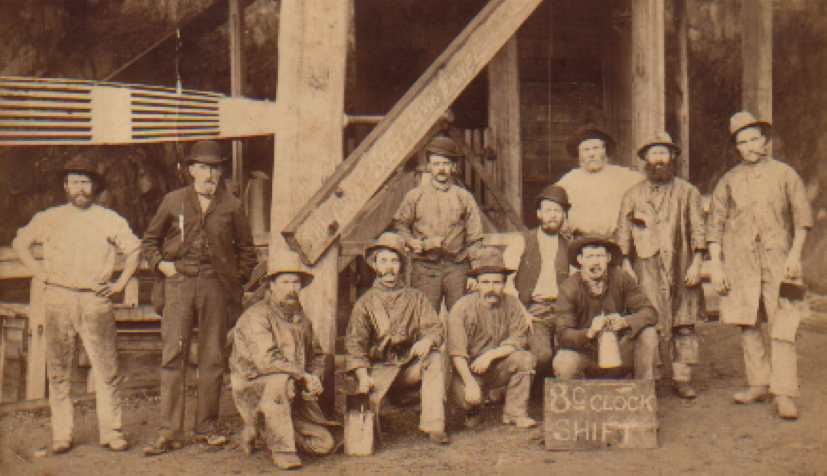
8 o'clock shift of the Great South Long Tunnel GMC, Walhalla, c. 1901. Jim Porter, shift boss, is squatting fifth from right, wearing a bowler hat and vest.

James Porter (known as ‘Jim’) was born on 10 April 1855 in Hindmarsh, South Australia. His father, Frederick Charles Porter, a miner and explorer of the Gippsland district, brought the family overland to Victoria in 1859. In late 1863, the family settled near the Fulton's Creek and Donnelly's Creek alluvial goldfields. As a nine-year old, whilst fossicking, Porter discovered a high-yielding quartz-gold reef near his parents’ inn, which was named ‘Boy’s Reef’, after him. When Porter was just 14 years of age, his father died. While his widowed mother, Eliza, took the younger children to Melbourne to live, Jim Porter remained in the district, seeking work in the local mines. Over the next decade he honed his skills in the mines as a carpenter and engineer. In 1880, he married Sarah McGregor Sutherland, with whom he reared eight children.

By 1899, Porter was the manager of the BB Quartz Gold Mining Company on BB Creek on the Jordan River goldfields, which his father had helped open up, back in 1862. His engineering skills helped this mine produce a record yield in its first seven months of battery crushing (i.e. 1,694 ounces of gold from 1,952 ton of rock). Porter also worked on the nearby Argyle Mine, erecting its poppet head. In 1901 Porter was employed as an engineer and shift boss in the Great South Long Tunnel Gold Mining Company in Walhalla, one of the mines digging Victoria’s richest gold-bearing quartz reef with shafts over 3,300 feet deep.

In 1912, with the gold depleted and the town dying, Porter moved to Bruarong near Yackandandah, where he oversaw the local gold-dredging operations. Dredges had replaced the old sand pumps and were operating in the creek beds. He worked for the Briseis Tin and General Mining Company.

Porter retired in 1917, when he was contacted by the Australian Army to collect his badly shell-shocked son, Alfred, who had been invalided home from the Somme. Porter died from bronchial asthma, a common disease amongst miners, on 8 September 1919, aged 64 years.
