= Ted Flynn =

Australian rules footballer, born 1880

Personal information
- Full name: Daniel Edward Flynn
- Born: 14 June 1880; Donnelly's Creek, Victoria
- Died: 11 June 1965 (aged 84); Maffra, Victoria
- Original team: Preston

Playing career^{1}
Years	Club	Games (Goals)
1903	Essendon	1 (0)
- ^{1} Playing statistics correct to the end of 1903.

Daniel Edward Flynn (14 June 1880 – 11 June 1965) was an Australian rules footballer.

In a very brief career with the Essendon Football Club, Flynn managed just one game during the 1903 season in the Victorian Football League, a draw against St Kilda. He was recruited from Preston in the VJFA.
