= George Porter (disambiguation) =

George Porter (1920–2002) was a British chemist and Nobel prize winner

George Porter may also refer to:

- George Porter (Royalist) (1622–1683), royalist army officer of the First English Civil War
- George Porter (conspirator) (1659–1728), English soldier and conspirator
- George de Hochepied, 6th Baron de Hochepied (1760–1828), British politician known for most of his life as George Porter
- George Bryan Porter (1791–1834), U.S. politician
- George Porter (mariner) (1786–1872), mariner and early pioneer of South Australia
- George Richardson Porter (1792–1852), British statistician
- George Porter (Upper Canada) (fl. 1793), early settler in Upper Canada, said to have constructed the first house in York, expanded into Berkeley House, York, Upper Canada
- George Porter (architect) (died 1856), British architect
- George Hornidge Porter (1822–1895), British surgeon
- George Porter (cricketer) (1861–1908), English cricketer
- George Porter (British politician) (1884–1973), British Labour MP for Leeds Central, 1945–1955
- George Porter (New Zealand politician) (1921–1998), New Zealand architect, company director and politician
- Barry Porter (George Barrington Porter, 1939–1996), British politician
- George Porter Jr. (born 1947), American musician
- George E. Porter (active 1965-1980), American sound engineer
- George Porter (hurdler) (born 1966), American athlete
- George Porter (rugby union) (born 1989), English rugby union player
- George Porter (footballer) (born 1992), English professional footballer
