= Cowwarr =

- Town
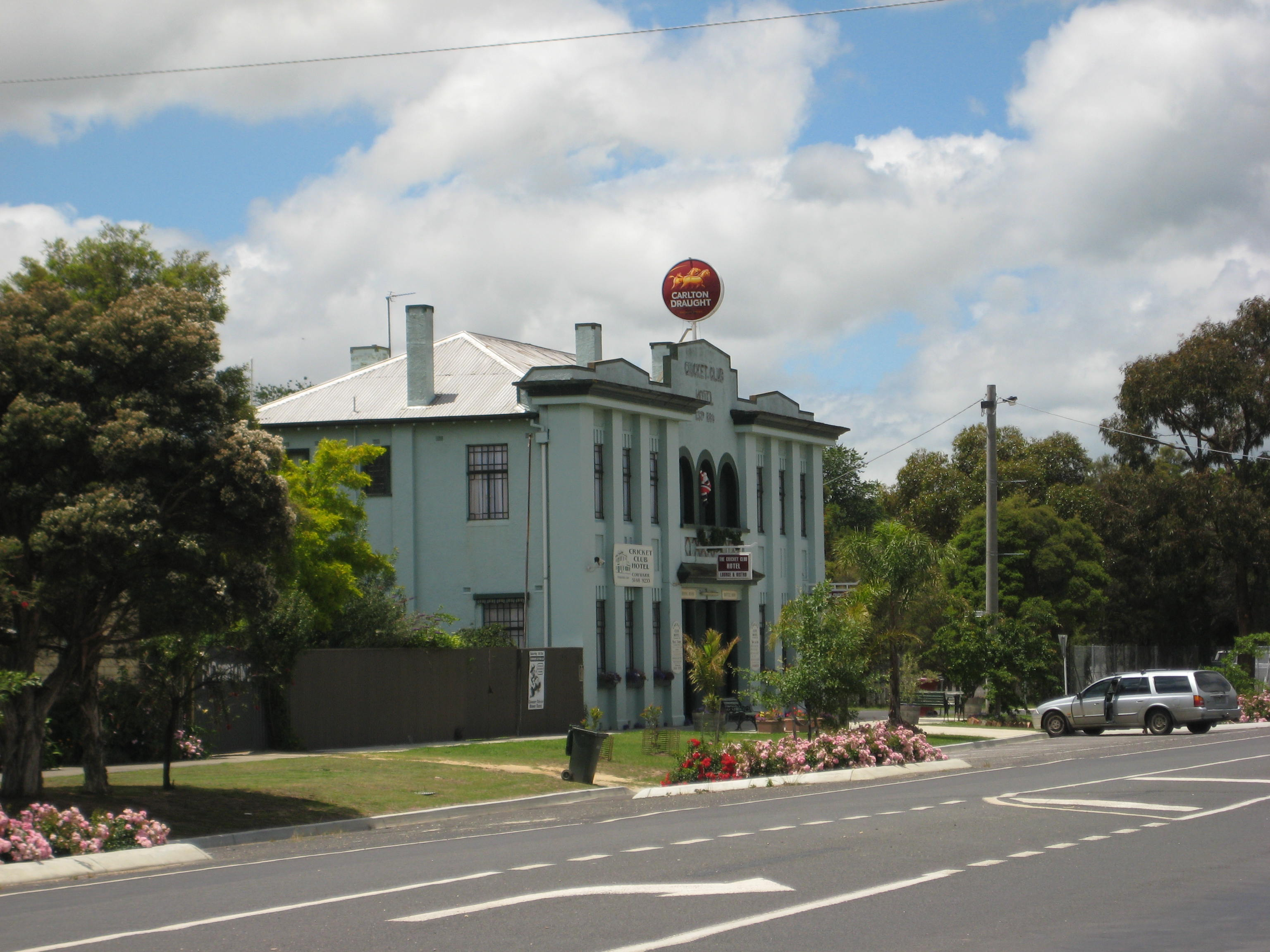

- Coordinates: 38°01′S 146°41′E
- Country: Australia
- State: Victoria
- LGA: Shire of Wellington
- Location: 186 km (116 mi) E of Melbourne; 28 km (17 mi) N of Traralgon; 10 km (6.2 mi) N of Toongabbie; 16 km (9.9 mi) W of Heyfield

Government
  - State electorate: Gippsland East
  - Federal division: Gippsland

Population
  - Total: 389 (2021 census)
- Postcode: 3857

Cowwarr is a town in Victoria, Australia, 27 kilometres north-east of Traralgon, 174 kilometres east of Melbourne, in the Shire of Wellington. At the 2021 census, Cowwarr and the surrounding area had a population of 389.

Established in the 1860s (when the usual spelling was "Cowwar"), the town serviced the area around Walhalla during the Victorian gold rush. The post office opened on 1 February 1869 as Upper Heyfield and was renamed Cowwarr in 1870.

Cowwarr was a wayside station on the former Traralgon-Maffra-Stratford railway, which opened in 1883. Daily passenger trains from Maffra ran through to Traralgon station (connecting to Melbourne and beyond) until 1977, and the last freight train passed through the town in 1987. The Traralgon to Cowwarr section of the line was closed in 1986 followed by the Cowwarr to Maffra section which closed in 1994. The former railway line was converted to the Gippsland Plains Rail trail.

From the late 1970s until the mid 1980s Cowwarr was also the location of the Independent State of Rainbow Creek, a secessionist micronation which was founded as a result of a long-running compensation dispute between a group of farmers, and an agency of the Victorian state government, the State Rivers and Water Supply Commission.

Historic buildings remain in the town today. A Heritage Listed Arts & Craft butter factory, built in 1918, was converted into the Cowwarr Art Space, a gallery for contemporary art. The gallery closed in February 2020. The Cricket Club Hotel, was first established in 1880 as a wooden building; the current concrete Art Deco building was constructed in 1930, as was the Cowwarr Public Hall opposite.

The town is supported by district farming, including dairy farming, irrigated from the Rainbow Creek, which runs past Cowwarr, and the Thomson River.

The town has an Australian Rules football team competing in the North Gippsland Football League, and a netball team.

The primary school burnt down in late January 2020 and rebuilt the following year.

The town has a picturesque Catholic church.
