= Jordan River Diversion Tunnel =

Infrastructure in Victoria, Australia

Coordinates: 37°38′13″S 146°16′14″E

The Jordan River Diversion Tunnel, a relic of the Victorian gold rush, is on the Jordan River near the locality of Jericho, about 7 km (4.3 mi) south of Woods Point in Gippsland, Victoria, Australia. The tunnel is about 30 m long x 4 m high x 3 m wide (98.4 ft × 13.1 ft × 9.8 ft), cut through rock. The river still runs through it.

No record has been found of the tunnel's construction and use. It has been alternatively attributed to either river-bed sluicers during the earliest mining period at Jericho (1861–1865) or to an attempt in 1872 to hasten floodwaters away from the township.

The site is listed in the Victorian Heritage Inventory.
