= Clement Wilks =

Australian civil engineer and architect

- Born: 15 February 1819; Peckham Rye, Surrey, England
- Died: 2 May 1871 (aged 52); St. Kilda, Victoria
- Spouse: Eliza Roberts
- Children: Mary Susan Wilks, b. 1850, London, d. date unknown, unknown, Maria Shenstone Wilks, b. 1853, Ballart, Australia, d. date unknown, unknown, Alice Prestcott Wilks, b. 1859, Ballart, Australia, d. 1932, Santa Cruz California, USA.
- Engineering career
- Discipline: civil engineer
- Projects: Yarra Track

Clement Wilks (15 February 1819 – 2 May 1871) was a civil engineer and architect in colonial Victoria, Australia.

== Early days ==
Clement Wilks was born at Peckham Rye, Surrey, 15 February 1819, the youngest son of the Rev. Mark Wilks, of Paris. He spent most of his early years in France and Switzerland and took his degree of Bachelor of Arts at the Collège de Paris in 1836.

After being engaged for a short time on the Paris to Saint-Germain-en-Laye railway, which opened in 1837, he went to England and was articled to Sir Charles Fox, then of the London works and Resident Engineer of the London and Birmingham Railway. His professional education was continued with Messrs. Fox, Henderson and Co. until 1841. In 1842 he had the chief management of a French engineering establishment on the Garonne, where he remained for three or four years. He then returned to England and was engaged to work with Mr. George Watson Buck, M.Inst.C.E. on the Ely and Huntingdon railway, then in the course of construction. After Mr. Buck's retirement from ill-health, he was associated with Mr. John Hawkshaw in surveying for the Manchester and Southport line and subsequently for the Lancashire and Yorkshire Railway near Heckmondwike.

In 1850, he was engaged in superintending the construction of various public buildings in London, under the direction of the Society for Improving the Dwellings of the Poor, a model of one of which was erected in connection with the Great Exhibition of 1851.

== Engineer, Colonial Victoria ==
In 1852, Clement Wilks left England for Australia, and immediately after arriving in Melbourne joined the Victorian Public Service, as an Assistant Colonial Engineer. He was an Engineer for the Central Road Board in the colony of Port Phillip, Australia, from 1854 to 1862. Wilks practised as an architect and engineer, having prepared designs for the Congregational Church, 24 Lyttleton Street West, Castlemaine in 1855 (Listed on the Register of the National Estate: Place 4203)

Clement Wilks was appointed Ballarat Road Engineer in 1857 having initially been stationed in Barkers Creek or Castlemaine. He had originally surveyed the Ballarat-Amherst main road (now the Old Ballarat Road) on which a series of unusually well-crafted bluestone bridges survives near Glendaruel, possible also to his design. He was also responsible for maintenance of the infamous corduroy road between Bungaree and Ballarat on the route from Geelong. This section of the so-called 'Plank Road' became legendary as a yardstick for bad roads in the colony of Victoria. It would appear that prior to Wilks being stationed in Ballarat, the roads of the district were administered from Melbourne.

Wilks also served on the Ballarat Sludge Commission, which was given the role of solving the flooding and silting problems caused by damage done by gold mining along the creeks.

Wilks remained in the post until January 1860 when he took a year's leave of absence to attend to 'urgent family matters in Europe', possibly in Switzerland where his family had connections, and he visited the United States and Canada, and then returned to Australia and resumed his former duties.

He joined the Department of Roads and Bridges in 1864, and reported on the road to the River Jordan Goldfield in the same year.

Wilks was a member of the Yarra Track Committee responsible for building this coach and dray road to the Woods Point Goldfields. He designed a number or small bridges and culverts including the Wilks Creek Bridge, that commemorates his name, on the Marysville Road. (Listed on the National Trust of Australia (Victoria) Register: B6439 and on the Register of the National Estate: Place 102643).

Built in 1871 as part of the historic "Yarra Track", its thrust blocks indicate an original under-strutted design; it probably originally had a single span. The timber superstructure of the Wilks Creek Bridge was rebuilt by Monash & Anderson in about 1900 and it was probably at this time that it was altered to 2 spans.

Wilks may have also been responsible for the design of The Big Culvert also on the "Yarra Track". (Listed on the National Trust of Australia (Victoria) Register: B5804 and on the Register of the National Estate: Place 5720).

In 1865, The Victorian Government having inaugurated a scheme for supplying water to the various mining districts, appointed him as the Resident Engineer to the Department of Water Supply, the position he occupied until his death in 1871. He was elected an Associate of the Institution of Civil Engineers on 7 December 1869.

A monument was erected to him in St Kilda Cemetery:
"Clement WILKS, Esq. J.P., late resident engineer, Victorian Water Supply Dept.
Erected by brother officers Departments of Victorian Water Supply and Roads & Bridges"

== Bibliography ==
- Cumming, D.A. Some Public Works Engineers in Victoria in the Nineteenth Century Technology Report No. TR-85/10. August 1985.
- Thomas, Ann. Wilks Creek Bridge at Marysville, Victoria. 1993.
- Stacpoole, H. (Ed). Tracks to the Jordan. Lowden, Kilmore, 1973.
