= Rainbow, Ohio =

Unincorporated community in Ohio, U.S.

Coordinates: 39°29′40″N 81°27′55″W

Rainbow is an unincorporated community in Washington County, in the U.S. state of Ohio.

== History ==
The first settlement at Rainbow was made in the spring of 1795. The community most likely took its name from Rainbow Creek. A post office called Rainbow was established in 1888, and remained in operation until 1903.
