= Walhalla Cricket Ground =

Coordinates: 37.9362°S 146.4540°E

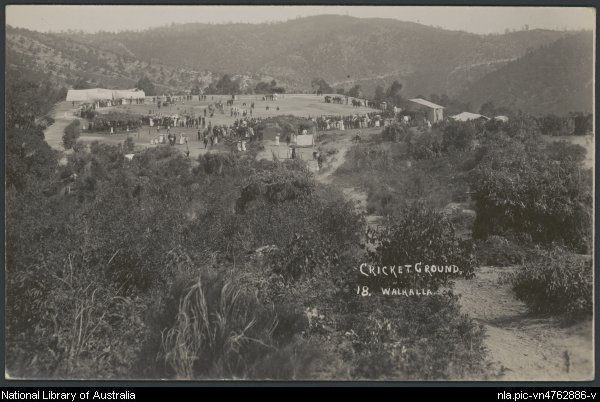
Walhalla Cricket Ground, c. 1906

The Walhalla Cricket Ground is a landmark in Walhalla, Victoria, Australia. Linked by a walking track from Walhalla Road, the cricket ground is perched at the top of a hill. Because there was a lack of flat ground in the township the mining community, in their spare time, carved the top off the mountain to construct a ground, this work being completed in 1882. It is claimed that the half-hour climb up the hill to reach the ground, in conjunction with the long trip to Walhalla itself, ensured a home advantage.

In the heyday of Walhalla's goldmining era, the ground was used for organised sporting events, including those of the Walhalla Football Association. Since large-scale mining stopped in 1910, the ground has largely been a tourist destination and curiosity, though it remained the site of occasional social cricket matches. It is referenced in Weddings Parties Anything's song "The Ghosts of Walhalla".

In January 1870, following an encouraging series of successes against teams such as Sale, Toongabbie and Tanjil, it was decided to officially form a Cricket Club in Walhalla. Mt William Gairdner, a prominent mining manager, was elected the first President of the club - which was referred to as the "Walhalla Eleven." Among the first actions of this group was the petitioning of the Victorian Government to permanently reserve the land that they had selected and to circulate and raise subscriptions for the further clearing of the area which today forms Walhalla's unique cricket ground.

In 2017 extensive restoration work was carried out on the playing surface before the bushfire of February 2019 completely destroyed the playing surface, synthetic pitch and the surrounding bush. The ground was subsequently fully restored.

== See also ==
- Victorian gold rush
