= Yarra Track =

Road in Victoria, Australia

Yarra Track Victoria
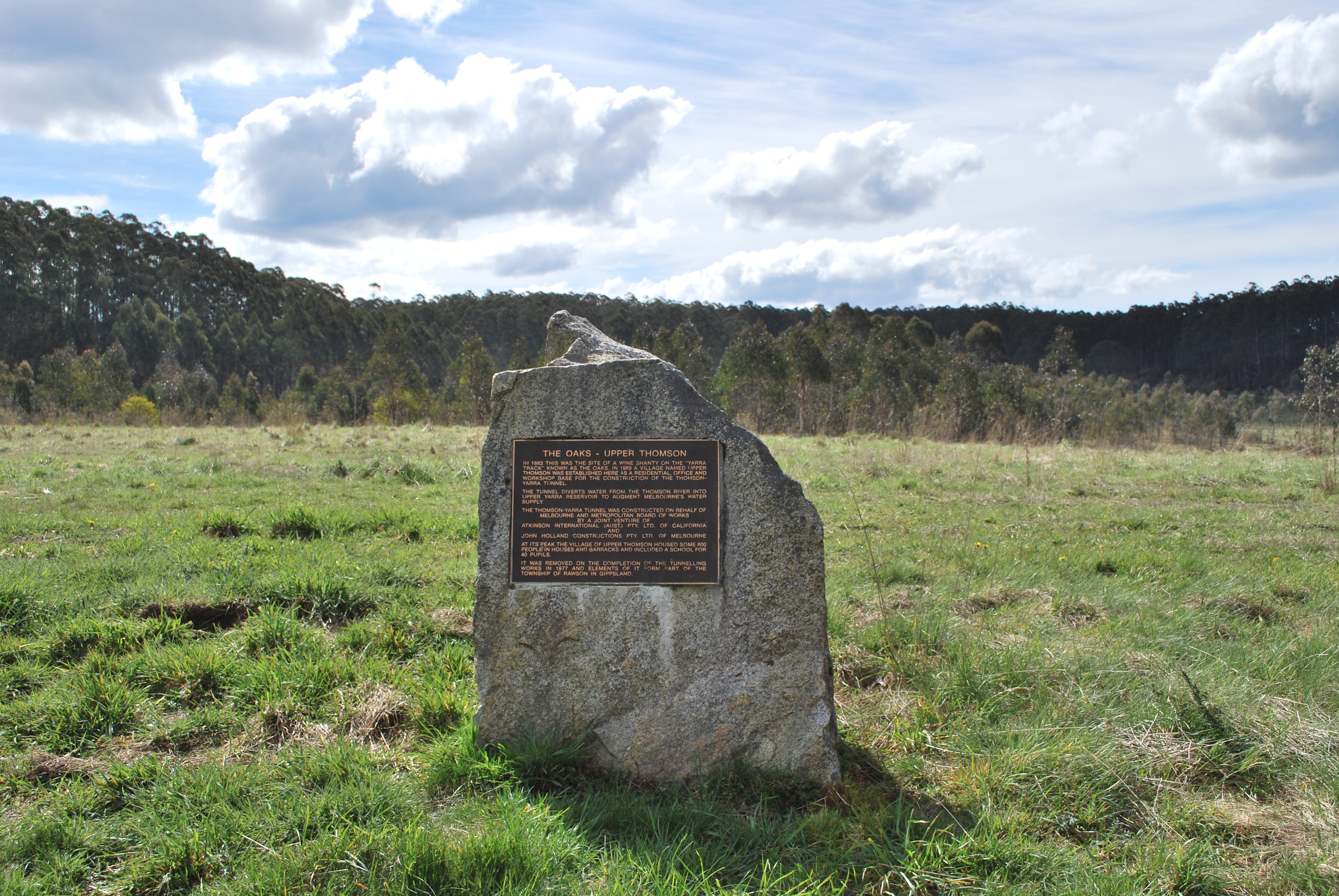
- A monument marking the site of The Oaks, a former shanty on the Yarra Track
- Yarra Valley
- Coordinates: 37°39′22″S 145°30′50″E (West end); 37°34′11″S 146°15′15″E (East end)

General information
- Type: Track
- Length: 193 km (120 mi)
- Opened: September 1862

Major junctions
- West end: Healesville
- East end: Woods Point

Location(s)
- LGA(s): Yarra Ranges Shire
- via: Fernshaw and Marysville; Yarra Ranges National Park

Highway system
- Highways in Australia; National Highway • Freeways in Australia; Highways in Victoria

The Yarra Track is the former name of the gold fields road from Healesville to the Woods Point and Jordan Goldfields, in Victoria, Australia. The Yarra Track originally began at New Chum, but subsequent route deviations and land surveys led to the establishment of new townships, including Healesville. The earlier settlements and original routes were eventually abandoned.

== Gold at New Chum in the 1850s ==
Traces of gold were found in New Chum Creek in the 1850s. Prospectors camped briefly on the grassy flats near the creeks junction with the Watts River, before they hacked their way through dense undergrowth into the mountains.

New Chum grew to serve these prospectors and gold miners. In 1859 William Hall had set up as a blacksmith at New Chum. By 1860 stores were brought from Melbourne by bullock cart to New Chum, where the carts were unloaded and transferred to pack horses.

Often called a hamlet, New Chum consisted of "two stores, blacksmith’s shop and three packers huts" "built of the most part of slabs, and roofed with shingles and bark." At that time it was noted that "some little bustle is created by the pack horses that are gathered around the place, with their drivers, either on the point of starting or having just returned.'"

In April 1864, New Chum was described as "a miserable collection of slab and bark huts situated at the foot of a steep hill, on the banks of the creek bearing the same name."

== The beginnings of the Yarra Track ==
In March 1862 J. Sullivan, deputised by the miners at the Jordon Diggings, approached the Victorian Government about the need for a road or track to the Jordan gold fields. The Victorian Government sent James Murphy, civil engineer and Government mining surveyor, with a party of men, to survey and mark a track. Murphy and Sullivan at first travelled together; however, after a difference of opinion on the best route to explore, they separated and marked different tracks. (Note: Sullivan went on to cut a track further south along the Warburton Valley of the Yarra River and into the Dividing Ranges.This track became known as Sullivan's Track as described in "The Herald" Sat 21 Feb 1863 Page 6 THE ROUTE TO THE JORDAN GOLD FIELDS.)

Murphy explored a track from New Chum to near what would become the Marysville Woods Point Road. He surveyed a route along the Watts River to its upper reaches; from there he ascended the spurs and ridges of Mt Dismal and explored a route running eastwards, south of Mt Observation, to beyond Donavan's Creek. He did not complete the survey of that explored section before being called back to Melbourne. His plan of that route is dated 23 July 1862.

Plan (compiled from various surveys, sketches etc.) and accompanying Report upon the Road from Melbourne to the Jordan Gold-Field, 23rd July 1862. James Murphy, Mining Surveyor, St Andrews.

Mr. Reick and Mr. Stockman, who were in Murphy’s surveying party, "believing that the direct road had been struck", resolved to follow it up. They followed Murphy’s route from New Chum to the end of his line of exploration. Reick describes their efforts:

"... far from having "left Murphy's track," we were actually members of that surveyor's party, engaged in Melbourne, to which place we returned when that officer, for reasons unknown to us, was recalled, and the party broken up, but not until the general lie of the country had been reconnoitered, and some fifteen miles actually surveyed, opened, and blazed. My companion and I then volunteered to explore and mark the remainder of this line into Jericho, upon the Jordan; and upon this difficult service we started on the 5th July from the settled country at the Melbourne end, and arrived on the diggings, two miles above Jericho township, upon the claim of Lapraig and party, on the 30th July."

They both suffered great hardships, narrowly escaping death by starvation and exposure. With a swag on their backs and using tomahawks they had cut through to the Jordan diggings, where they remained for ten days to recover their strength.

Upon Reick and Stockman returning from the gold fields, a meeting was held at Eltham and a sum of money subscribed by residents of the district to cut a bridle path along the route.

Blazing their marks over some of the previously made government survey marks, they cut a track along the surveyed section of Murphy's route. After ascending the spur to Mt Dismal, they deviated from Murphy's explored route that they had followed earlier, and cut a track through the Dividing Ranges. First heading northwards and then easterly across Paradise Plains until they joined Guerin's Track, (Note: Thomas Guerin was exploring and blazing a route from the south in mid September 1862. Guerin wrote on the 1st November 1862 that he had cut a track for pack horses to Jordan. He was also aware of two private parties cutting tracks.) north of Mount Observation, which in turn joined the upper reaches of Sullivan's Track to the Jordan. (Note: Sullivan began cutting a track in April 1862. He announced completion of his track on the 16th October.)

In late September 1862, Reick and Stockman had cut the track about 20 miles from New Chum into the Dividing Ranges and were camped at head of the Acheron River. They expected to cut a further 25-30 miles and have the track open in three weeks. Given the different blazed and cut tracks they placed notices along their route; Reick's to Melbourne via Eltham and "Notice: Any persons wishing to follow Reick's track to the Jordan, must keep the longest and freshest looking tracks where the tracks differ or branch off along the route".

By 25 October 1862, Reick and Stockman (Note: The Age in April 1863 reported that both Reick and Stockman were amongst people that received a reward for opening up practicable tracks between Melbourne and the Jordan gold fields. The complete list includes Sullivan, £75; Connell, £60; McEvoy, £40; Walsh, £30; Ganley, £50; Ryan, £30; Rucke [sic], £10; Storkman [sic], £38; James, £28; Butcher, £28; Strickland £28; M'Cormack, £28; Robley, £25) had cut the bridle track through to Jordan and called it the New Jordan Road; others called it Reick's Track. This early track from New Chum to the Jordan, and subsequent deviations and surveyed routes, ultimately became known as the Yarra Track.

== Blazing and construction of the Yarra Track begins ==
The Yarra Track had several different routes over its life. The tracks and roads from New Chum to the gold fields were some of the earliest.

New Chum was at the furthest point coaches could travel along the route from Melbourne. From there, Murphy’s Track, a packhorse track, climbed through the mountains to the diggings. Murphy’s Track was surveyed in mid 1862 over the spurs of Mount Monda on the northern side of the Watts River. The track was still in use in late 1863. However by October 1863 an alternative route on the southern side of the Watts River had also been blazed by Mr. Farrell, Assistant Road Engineer and was in use by foot traffic.

In December 1863 several government contracts were awarded and road construction commenced along this alternative route that had been blazed by Farrell. By early 1864 this route of the Yarra Track from New Chum to what would become Fernshaw had been cleared for about four miles. At 5 miles the track again returned to the Murphy’s Track. (Note: The Viator’s letter to the editor of the Age refers to having travelled along the route "early last month". The letter is published on the 1st of April, which suggests that the letter to the editor was written in March 1864. On the basis that the letter was written in March, then the reference to "early last month" would be to early February 1864.) By February 1864, R. W. Larritt, Inspector General of Roads reported 8 miles had been marked and about 6 miles cleared.

This alternative route of Mr. Farrell, Assistant Road Engineer, was the earliest route of the Yarra Track constructed by the Victorian Government.

== Early tracks bypass New Chum and shape the future location of Healesville ==
McDonald, G. July 1864 Survey Plan Evelyn showing early tracks to Woods Point Gold Field

In late 1862 the shortest route to Woods Point and the Jordan Goldfield from Melbourne was via a good dray road to New Chum, beyond which the Yarra Track became a bridle track. Over time more prospectors and miners travelled along this route to Woods Point and the Jordan Gold Fields. Not all these miners travelled by horse or coach and large numbers travelled by foot. Tracks soon developed that bypassed New Chum and took a more direct route to join the Yarra Track further along the Watts River Valley.

George McDonald's July 1864 Survey Plan of Evelyn documents these early tracks. About four miles before New Chum, near the Hit and Miss Restaurant, the tracks headed either north via New Chum to Woods Point, or bypassed New Chum by crossing the Watts River and then continuing east along Cameron’s Track to the Glenwatts Store before rejoining the Yarra Track. (Note: The Hit or Miss Restaurant was on the road to New Chum, about four miles distant. On the 25th June 1864 two allotments were surveyed at the Hit or Miss Restaurant by George McDonald. The plan shows the Hit or Miss Restaurant restaurant near these lots. A track from the restaurant, crosses the Watts River via Stevenson Bridge and joins two tracks; one heading north east, to Woods Point via Glenwatts’ Store and the other heading south east, to the Aboriginal Station.)

Further downstream, crossing the Yarra River at Castella’s Bridge (December 1863), and Rourke’s Bridge (March 1864) other tracks headed initially northwards to join Cameron’s Track and then on to the Yarra Track. (Note: George McDonald's 16th July 1864 Survey Plan of Evelyn marks the early tracks bypassing New Chum with dashed lines. Notably only some tracks have their irregular route overlaid in red with formal survey lines and points. This indicates the tracks existed prior to the survey being undertaken. The common ‘hand’ of the draftsman or surveyor suggests contemporaneous addition to the base plan.)

These early tracks and bridges that bypassed New Chum provided the impetus for later government deviations of the Yarra Track and influenced the selection of the new township site that became Healesville. (Note: George McDonald's 16th July 1864 Survey Plan of Evelyn details what existed at that time. The plan shows New Chum, the Hit and Miss Restaurant, Cameron’s Track, the Glenwatts Store, several bridges, and other local features. In addition to surveying the existing tracks and structures, McDonald mapped a new route that bypassed New Chum and later became the government’s preferred road to Woods Point and indicatively marks the proposed site of an unnamed township. This township would be surveyed later and named Healesville.)

== Cameron's Glenwatts Store ==
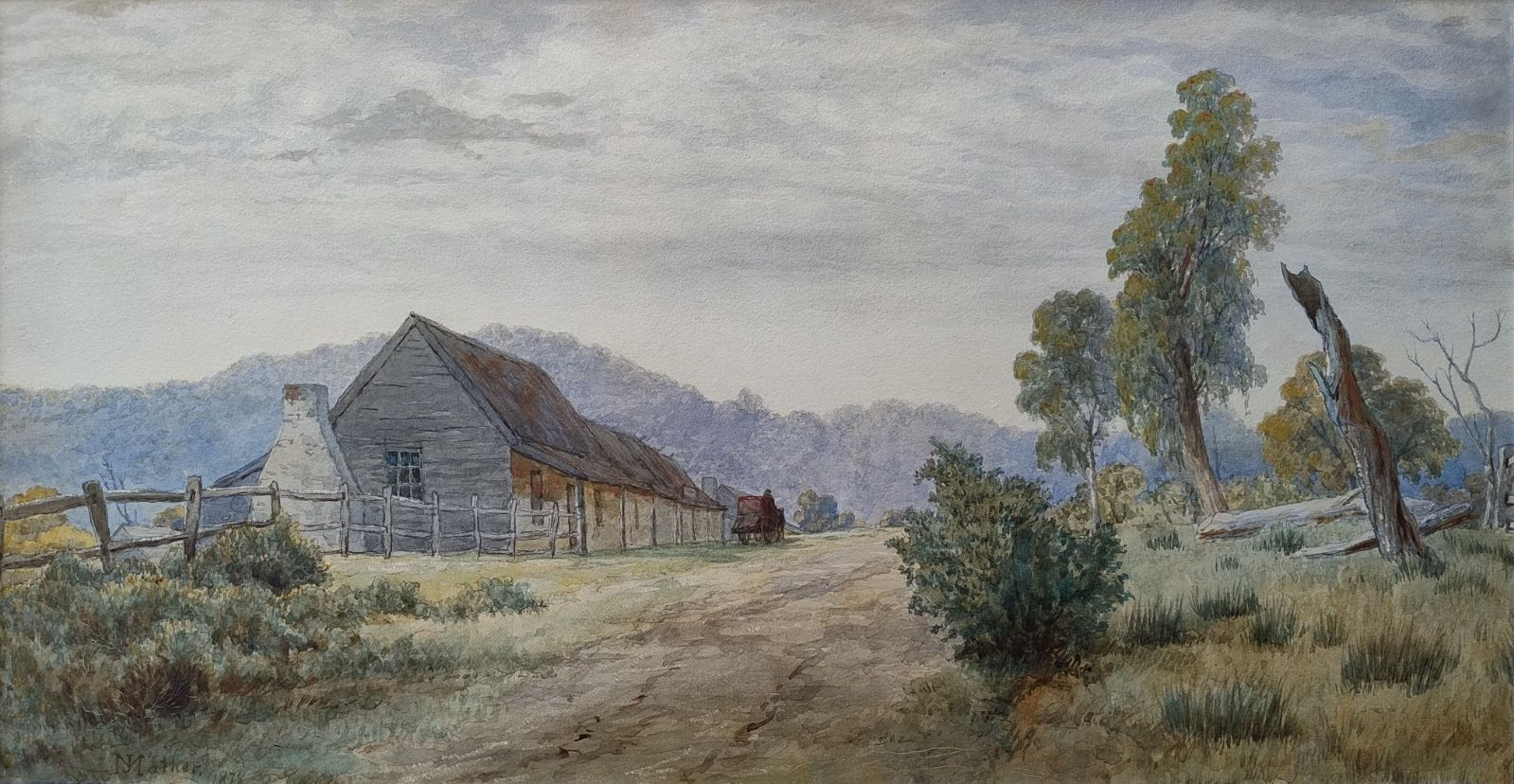
John Mather's 1878 watercolour of Cameron's Glenwatts Store on the Yarra Track

The Glenwatts Store was one of the earliest stores established on the Yarra Track and played a significant role in shaping the route’s development and influenced the location of Healesville. By early 1864, both the store and Cameron’s Track that led to it were already established when surveyor George McDonald proposed an alternative government route to Woods Point and identified the site that would later become Healesville

Four months before McDonald’s July 1864 survey, the Inspector General of Roads, R. W. Larritt, had proposed a deviation to bypass New Chum. On 9 July 1864, Larritt wrote to the Surveyor General following up this suggestion, noting that the proposed deviation would rejoin the Yarra Track at “the present cleared road at Cameron’s Store.”

The Glenwatts Store was also known as Cameron's Store and Cameron’s depot for goods and pack horses. The store was used as a landmark at this time, further demonstrated by an application approved on 27 July 1864 for a rural store allotment “six miles beyond Cameron’s depot for goods and pack horses,” and by references to the store in the Plan of Allotments at the Hit or Miss Restaurant.

The Glenwatts Store and Cameron’s Track were likely established between October 1862, when the Yarra Track was first opened by Reick and Stockman, and October 1863, when an alternative route surveyed by Mr Farrell, Assistant Road Engineer, passed the Glenwatts Store before continuing along the Watts River Valley. (Note: The Plan of Allotment at the Glenwatts Store on the road from Melbourne to Woods Point shows a building aligned at right angles to Farrell’s route but parallel to Cameron’s Track. This orientation towards Cameron's Track rather than Farrell's route, together with the observation that early government surveys often responded to the paths of prospectors and miners, suggests that the Glenwatts Store may predate October 1863.) In any case, the store certainly existed by July 1864, as confirmed various survey plans, correspondence, and related documents.

The land on which the store stood was purchased by Ewen Cameron on the 23rd August 1864, formalising his ownership of the existing establishment. The two acre allotment, formerly occupied by the Glenwatts Store and owned by Cameron, was located on the northwest corner of Mc Gregor Avenue East and Maroondah Parade, Healesville. (Note: A plan dated 23 August 1864, created an allotment containing the Glenwatts Store. The allotment containing the Glenwatts Store was part of Crown Land Sales on 23th August 1864. The advertised special lot’s site description, lot number and size correspond with survey plan. The results of Crown Land Sale were reported the next day, with Ewan Cameron as purchaser of two acres of land at the upset price. Other than the misspelling of Ewen’s first name and the incorrect Lot number, all other details match. The lot number appears to be a type face error. Especially as date of the land sale results is one day after advertised auction of allotment 1 and that Ewan Cameron is purchaser of two acres of land at upset price. Other plans and documents of the time confirm Ewan Cameron's ownership of the land and that he operated a general store. The two acre allotment was located on the northwest corner of Mc Gregor Avenue East and Maroondah Parade, Healesville. The two acre lot has been subdivided into eight suburban lots. However the original lot boundaries can still be seen.)

By 1868, as traffic to the goldfields declined and the surrounding forest was gradually cleared for farming, Cameron was recorded locally as a farmer rather than as a storekeeper or hotel keeper.

The store is likely depicted in a watercolour by John Mather (artist). The work suggests that the site continued to operate as a stopping place for coach traffic into the late 1870s. By 1878, the building was among the oldest surviving structures associated with the early development of the Yarra Track.

Cameron died on 23 March 1876 at Glen Watts, aged 63. At the time of his death he owned the Glenwatts Store and other landholdings, ownership which of passed to his wife Mary.

== History ==
With various deviations, the Victorian Government continued to construct a 193-kilometre (120 mi) road along the route. Its original width varied between 4 and 6 metres (12 and 20 ft), and was designed to accommodate horse-drawn vehicles. This track involved the climbing of the Black Spur, descent into the Acheron Valley, and then through Marysville to the Cumberland where it followed the existing route. The old route through Paradise Plains subsequently dropped out of vogue.

Two main construction camps were established in new localities on the Yarra Track at Healesville and Marysville. These were surveyed as towns to serve as base camps for construction teams and as staging towns when the coach route was completed. Marysville was founded and surveyed in August, 1864. Healesville was surveyed in September 1864, which resulted in the deviation of the settlement at New Chum.

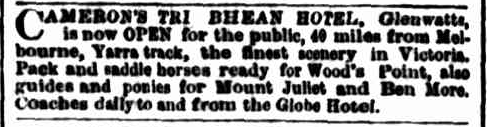
Advertisement Cameron's Tri Bhean Hotel 1866

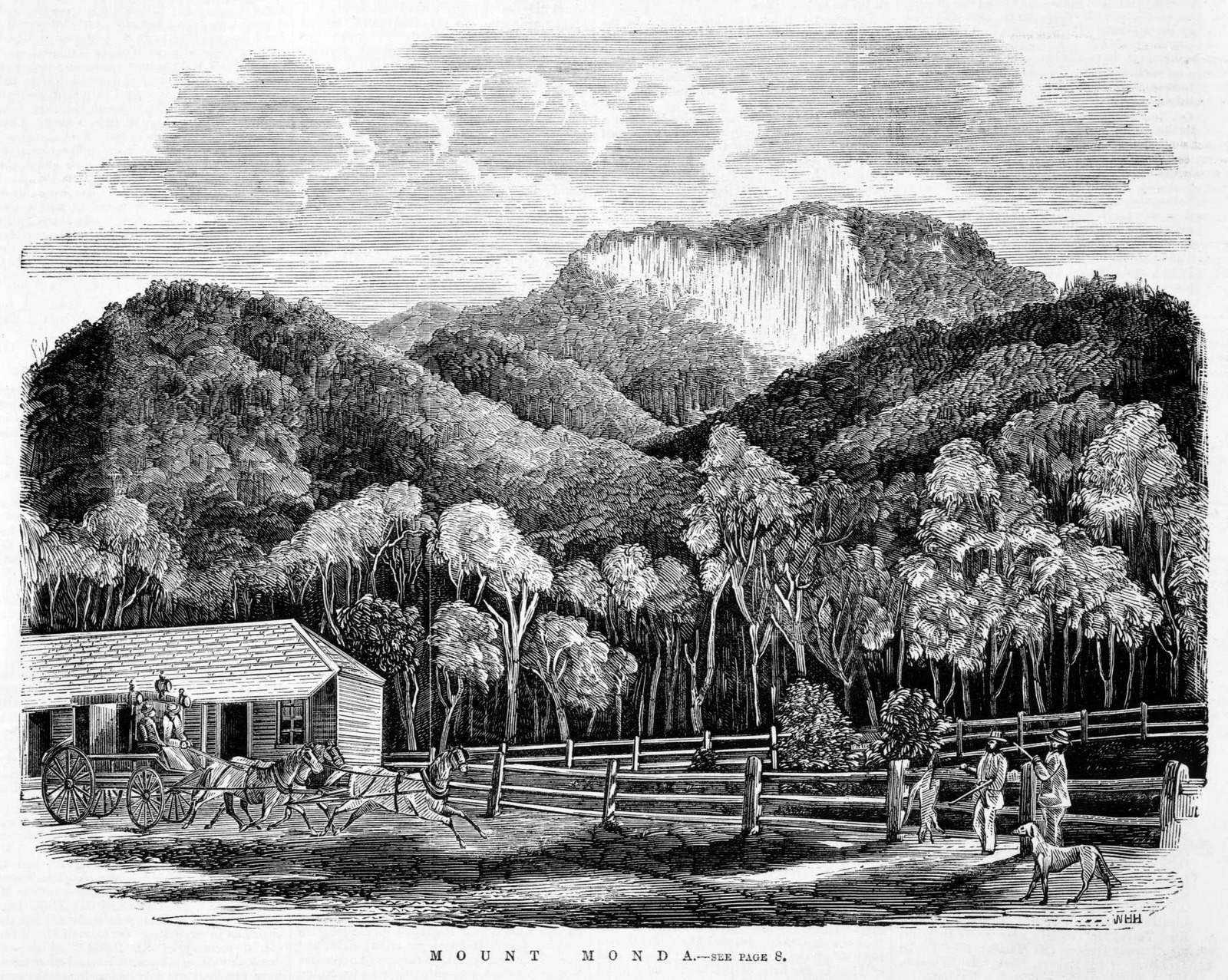
View of Mount Monda from near a house formerly known as Cameron’s Hotel, on the road between Healesville and Fernshaw, 1868. (Note: In January 1866 Cameron's Tri Bhean Hotel, Glenwatts was advertised as; Now open for the public, 40 miles from Melbourne, Yarra track, the finest scenery in Victoria. Pack and saddle horses ready for Woods Point, also guides and ponies for Mount Juliet and Ben More. Coaches daily to and from the Globe Hotel. Not to be confused with Cameron's Glenwatts store, the hotel was located on the main road from Healesville to Woods Point, beyond Healesville but before Henry Box's accommodation and the Mosquito Creek Bridge at Glenwatts (later Maytown) and Fernshaw. In August 1865 Cameron had purchased Lot 34, two acres of land with £1000 improvements on the new section of the Yarra Track surveyed by George McDonald the previous year. The improvements are shown on the subdivision plan as buildings. Beyond Healesville, lot 34 is the only small allotment of a size typically set aside for accommodation or rural stores until the subdivided land at Maytown and Fernshaw. The lot was located at the end of a survey line completed by George McDonald in 1864, on a ridge at the foot of a steep rise beyond which the proposed road was unsurveyed. Later when the Yarra Track had been constructed, this section of the track would be known as Cameron’s Pinch. The road through the forest was exceedingly good all the way with one remarkable exception, this part of the road was called Cameron's Pinch. As a pinch it would probably bear comparison with anything of the kind in the colony, but as a road I did not think much of it; almost as steep as the side of a house, as full of ruts and gullies as it could possibly be, it looked to the uninitiated traveller an impenetrable barrier to further progress. As we approached the commencement of the "pinch" the driver squared himself in his seat, took fresh hold of the reins, glanced at the brake, and clenched his teeth in a way that evidently meant business. At the foot of the pinch the horses charged gallantly, and once fairly started those intelligent animals treated us to an exhibition of acrobatism which I should have hardly thought those quadrupeds were equal to. At times clambering like cats, at other times leaping like kangaroos, and again balancing themselves like the swallow on the house top, they alike excited our wonder and admiration, tempered, however, by occasional fears that losing their balance they might fall back on to the top of the coach. The driver kindly assured us, however, that he had never met with such an accident "as yet," and as after a while we reached the summit in safety and going down on the other side, the driver pointed out the new road, which, passing round the foot of the hill, cut off the pinch entirely, and as the new road was opened on the following day we had the satisfaction of knowing that no accident ever did happen, and that we were the last travellers who risked their necks on Cameron's Pinch. Another hour's smart driving through the forest, and rattling across the Watt's Bridge, we found ourselves at Fernshaw, … The ‘pinch’ and the survey of the new road are illustrated in plans from 1866 and 1894. The origin of the name is clear given the proximity of Ewen Cameron's land holdings. There at the foot of the pinch, about two miles from Healesville on what is now the road to Marysville, he briefly ran Cameron's Tri Bhean Hotel.)

Shanties were built every five or six miles from Healesville to the diggings. Accommodation houses and stores were strung along the rest of the road. As construction of the road progressed, smaller allotments, settlements and rural land was surveyed and the land auctioned in Crown land sales. The Glenwatts Store, Hit or Miss Restaurant, Jefferson's Store, Marysville, Healesville, Mt Arnold, Granton, Fernshaw, and Maytown were progressively surveyed from 1864 to 1866. In 1865, the first drays and wagons reached Woods Point via the Yarra Track, but they could only get through during the summer months. The Yarra Track shortened the trip to Woods Point from Melbourne to a little over 161 kilometres (100 mi), compared with 354 kilometres (220 mi) via Jamieson.

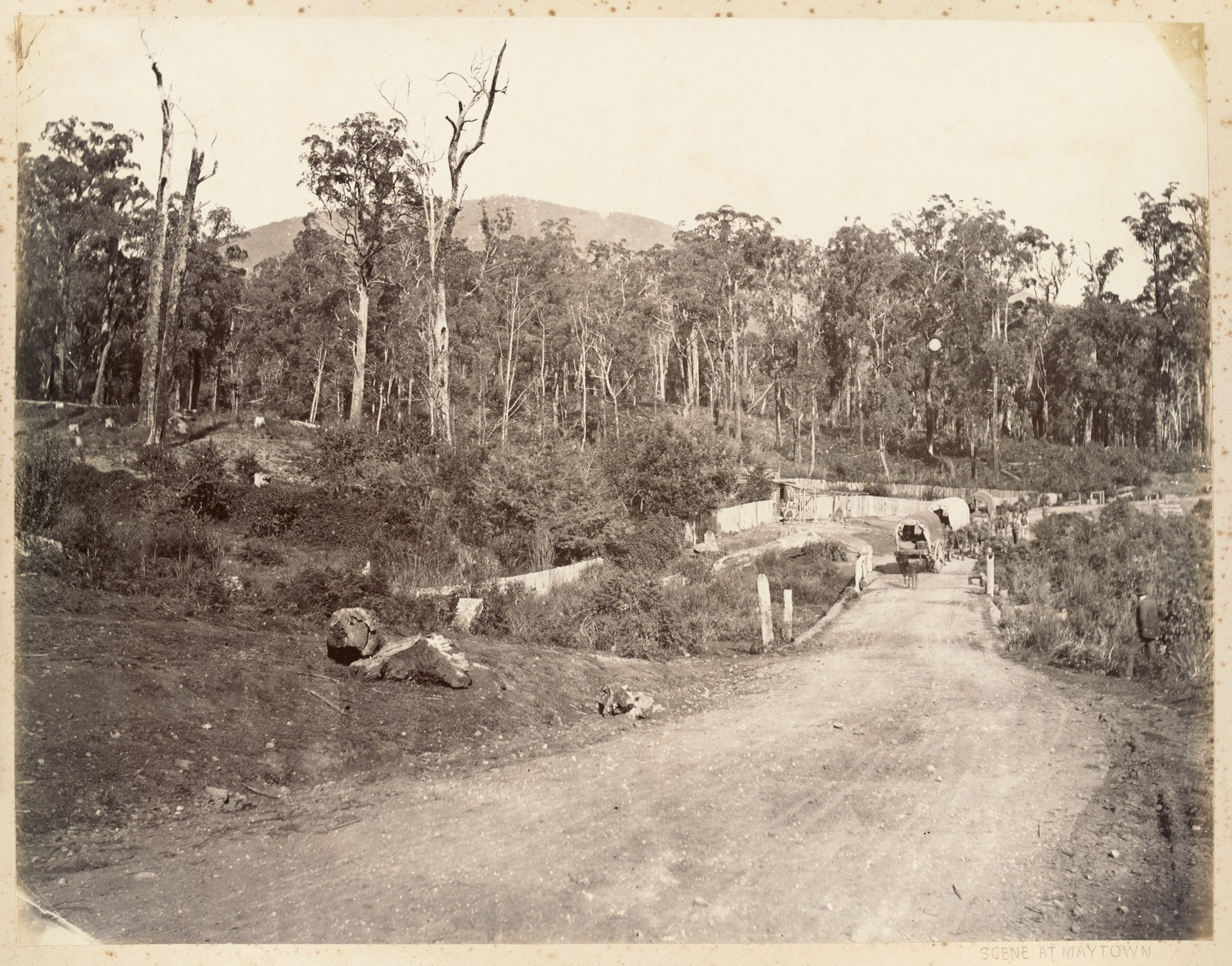
The Yarra Track crossing Mosquito Creek at Maytown near Fernshaw, Victoria, 1879, Nicholas Caire (Note: Various historical reports of Maytown note that timber splitters Messr. Box and Croom and family were there, before a party of road makers that included Thomas Leeder, C. Sims and A. Trask. Henry Box (accommodation house and then labourer), Croom (Splitter), Thomas Leeder [sic] (labourer), James Sims (labourer), and Charles Deakin settled at Maytown near Fernshaw and are noted in Butler's 1866 Directory and subsequent directories of 1868 and 1869.)

Clement Wilks, an engineer with the Victorian Department of Roads and Bridges, was a member of the Yarra Track Committee responsible for building this coach and dray road, designing a number or small bridges and culverts including the Wilks Creek Bridge, on the Marysville Road, and the Big Culvert.

The Black Spur section became a popular tourist destination and sought after location for notable early photographers in Victoria, such as Nicholas Caire and J. W. Lindt.

In 1916 a bus service was introduced, taking travellers over the route in two twelve-seater Buick charabancs. The journey from Melbourne took four and a half hours.

== See also ==
- Roads in Victoria

== Notes and references ==
Notes

=== Bibliography ===
- Thomas, Ann. The last of the Yarra Track stopping place. Marysville, 1983.
- Thomas, Ann. Wilks Creek Bridge at Marysville, Victoria. 1993.
