= Walhalla Football Association =

Defunct Australian rules football competition

The Walhalla Football Association was an Australian rules football league based in the old Victorian gold mining town of Walhalla. The competition ran from 1888 to 1913 with three teams: Commonwealth, North United and YMC. Matches were played at the Walhalla Cricket Ground.

== History ==
The competition began when two teams (Commonwealth and North United) played a game on the Walhalla Cricket Ground. They were later joined by YMC. Two teams would play on Saturday while the other team had a bye. These matches soon became one of the highlights of the week during the winter months. The position of the ground at the top of a large hill soon became advantageous to Walhalla teams. It is said that, due to the relative difficulty in reaching the ground, local players would walk up the hill to it the night before a match so that by the time the spectators arrived the next day the players were rested and ready to play. When visiting teams came to the town, they would walk the steep track to the playing field, causing them to lose large amounts of energy before matches began.
