= Pearson, Victoria =

Pearson was a town in Victoria, Australia, located southwest of Walhalla. It was in the local government area of the Shire of Baw Baw. It was also known as The Happy, and Happy Go Lucky.

The town's history began with the discovery of a quartz reef outcrop or 'blow' by prospector William McGregor in 1863. McGregor was cutting an access track into the mining town of Walhalla when he came across this feature. He examined the rock but failed to find any gold in it. He later showed this to a workmate William Cummin, whose sharper eyes noted that this was not the case. Cummin kept this discovery to himself and soon after he left McGregor's prospecting party and went to Seaton to register a prospecting claim on the site. He later gave McGregor a 1/8 share in this claim as a token gesture of the find.

The town's mines yielded rich gold which was easily extracted at first. The very first crushing of the Happy Go Lucky Quart Gold mine yielded an incredible 700 oz from 150 tons of rock. By May 1868 some 14,862 ozs had been obtained by the town's mines. Prominent mines included the GreyHorse, Lillydale, Union Jack, Evening Star, Wulfsode, Esmeralda and Castle Rose.

By 1864 a booming village had developed including 3 hotels, bakers, butchers, and restaurants. In addition to the area's mining activity, the town had become an important stop for the packing trade which was bringing mining equipment and other goods into nearby Walhalla. The town was surveyed in 1865 and named Pearson after William Pearson, a prominent local pastoralist, mining investor, politician and horseracing identity. Locals inexplicably resisted this name change and continued to call it Happy go Lucky or 'The Happy.'

At its peak it had a population of around 300 including a small community of Chinese prospectors. Happy-Go-Lucky Post Office opened on 12 June 1865. Its first postmaster was Edward Alexander who operated from 7 a.m. to 8 p.m each day.

By the 1870s mining activity had slowed, and Pearson became a satellite town of Walhalla. The Union Hotel and the general store remained until 1912. The Post Office closed in 1916. The advent and completion of the Moe Walhalla rail line also sounded the final death knell for the town as the packing trade through it dwindled. Only ruins exist today.
