= George Porter (mariner) =

Australian mariner (1786–1872)

George Porter (1786-1872) was a mariner and early pioneer of South Australia. He worked as a sea captain for the East India Company in the whaling industry. He is notable for fathering explorer Frederick Charles Porter and being the cousin of Australian settler and shipping company operator William Field Porter.

He is associated with several landmarks, having established a grocery store and a small farm. His home was converted into Sirius Private Hospital, a building which stands today for its historical significance to the area.

== Biography ==
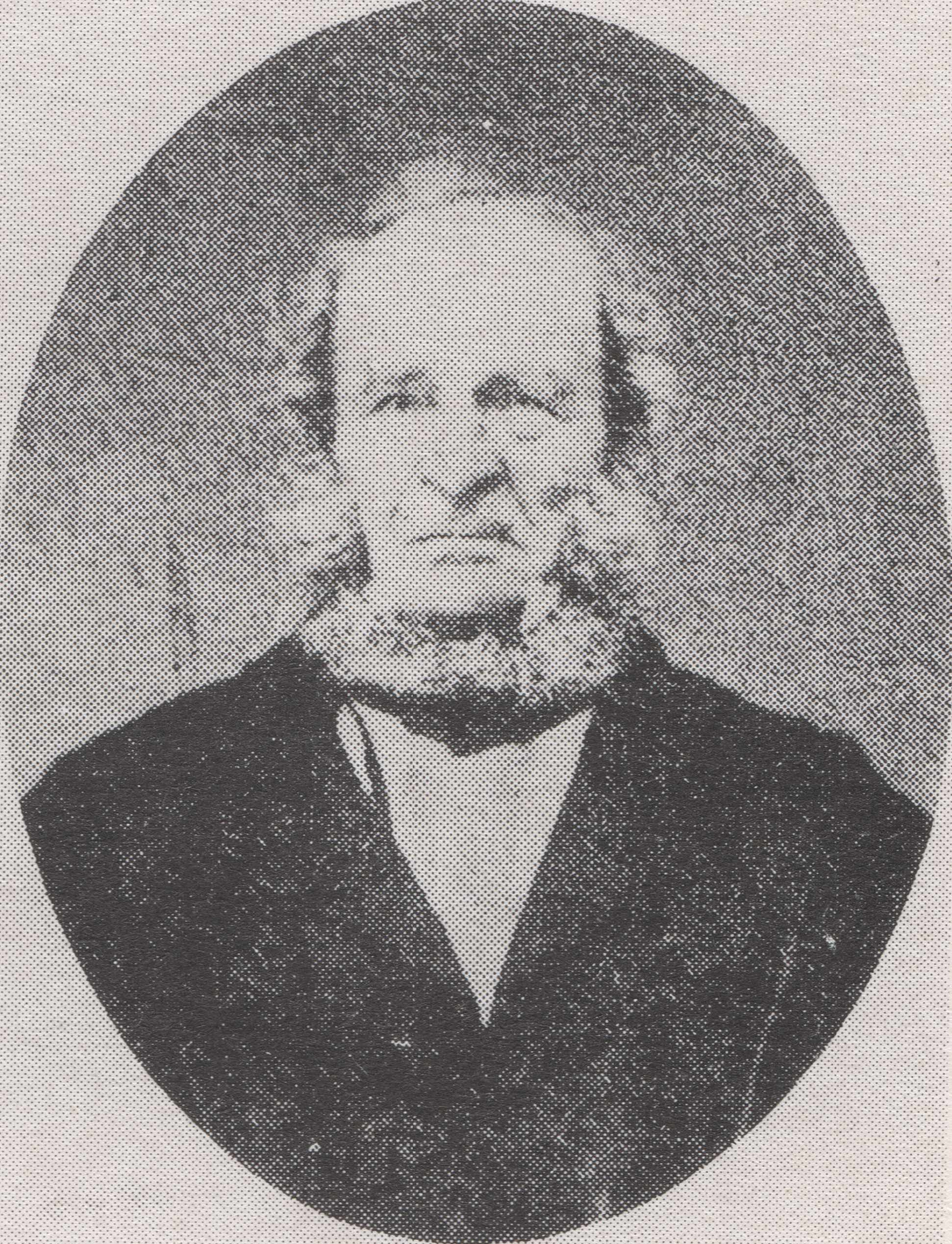
George Porter, whaler and South Australian pioneer, c. 1865

Porter was born in 1786 in Queenborough, England. In 1809, he married Elizabeth Bassett, with whom he had eleven children. She was the daughter of a Kentish dredger, Henry Bassett, operating in the badly silted estuaries of the Swale and Medway.

Porter was a senior sea captain in the employ of the British East India Company, working mainly as a whaler. The deteriorating economic conditions in Queenborough and his positive experiences in the western Pacific seem to have led to the family’s decision to emigrate to Australia with most of their children in October 1839. Their youngest child, Frederick Charles Porter, became an explorer and miner in the Victorian goldfields. The migration may also have been influenced by his cousin, Captain William Field Porter (born, 1784), who had financed and led what was to be an unsuccessful party of settlers to Port Lincoln in two ships, nine months earlier. He helped his cousin set up one of the first shipping services operating out of Port Lincoln and Port Adelaide to Australian and New Zealand ports.

Upon arrival, Porter settled in Albert Town (now known as Alberton), near Port Adelaide. Captain Porter's home was converted later into the Sirius Hospital, located at 23 Prince Street in June 1914.

Porter set up a grocery store near the docks and also established a small farm in the hinterland.

Porter outlived his wife and seven of his children. He died from ‘apoplexy’ (i.e. stroke) on 19 May 1872, aged 85 years. George and Elizabeth Porter are both buried in the old Alberton Cemetery, which is now a public park.
