= Rainbow Creek (Ohio) =

Stream in Ohio, United States

Coordinates: 39°29′35″N 81°29′33″W

Rainbow Creek is a stream entirely within Washington County, Ohio.

Rainbow Creek, noted for its rainbow shape, lent its name to the community of Rainbow, Ohio.

== See also ==
- List of rivers of Ohio
