= Independent State of Rainbow Creek =

Micronation in Australia

- Micronation (unrecognized entity)
- A set of 1979 Rainbow Creek stamps showing Barnes, his secession document, and the creek at the centre of his troubles
- Area claimed: Farmland in Cowwarr, Victoria, Australia
- Claimed by: Thomas Barnes
- Dates claimed: 23 July 1979–present

The Independent State of Rainbow Creek was an Australian secessionist micronation active during the 1970s and 80s, located in Cowwarr, a town on the Thomson River in the Victorian Alps. It was founded on 23 July 1979 by Thomas Barnes in protest of alleged incompetence by the Government of Victoria and others in regards to the flooding of his and others' properties.

== Background ==
It was founded as a result of a long-running compensation dispute between a group of Victorian farmers in the town of Cowwarr, and an agency of the Victorian state government, the State Rivers and Water Supply Commission (SRWSC).

A road bridge built over the Thomson River at Cowwarr in the late 1930s proved to be sited too close to the annual flood high-water mark, so when that structure proved an impediment to the flow of debris during a particularly violent flood in 1952, the river simply carved a new course for itself around the edge of the bridge. This "breakaway" - later named Rainbow Creek - passed through a number of privately owned farming properties. Remedial action proved ineffective, and the creek was enlarged by subsequent flooding to the size of several football fields - at the expense of the affected farmers’ lands.

The farmers began using water from the creek to irrigate their properties, however, local and state authorities responded by serving them with levies for water use. Those affected had to pay one set of levies to the local council for land which was now underwater because their title deeds did not show the existence of the creek, a second levy to the SRWSC for using creek waters for irrigation purposes, and a third levy to the Thomson River Improvement Trust which was supposed to prevent further erosion by the creek - which nonetheless continued to grow with each new flood. The SRWSC then constructed a weir across the river downstream of the bridge in 1954, which had the effect of funneling even higher volumes of floodwater directly into Rainbow Creek.

By the late 1970s, the creek was 8 metres (26 feet) deep and over 50 metres (164 feet) wide, and farmers had to privately fund the construction of bridges to cross from one part of their properties to the other. These were all washed away, along with crops, stock, and equipment by particularly severe flooding in 1978. The farmers of Cowwarr had long blamed government incompetence over nearly three decades for their woes, but when they were denied the right to claim compensation for loss of land, productivity, and private infrastructure in 1978 they decided to take further action.

One of the worst affected properties was Yammacoona, located directly below the weir, and owned by Thomas Barnes since 1970. Barnes was a retired UK and Victorian police officer who had settled in the town some time before. He was known as a man of feisty temperament with little patience for the slow-turning wheels of government bureaucracy, and a flair for publicity.

== Secession ==
In an attempt to gain public sympathy Barnes and around thirty other farmers decided to declare war on the state of Victoria. Signed on 19 December 1978, the Declaration was served with due pomp to a bemused governor in Melbourne on 16 January 1979, before banks of television cameras. Some legal scuffling between Barnes and the SRWSC followed in the Victorian court system, during which minor points were won and lost on both sides, after which a government offer of loans - but not the desired compensation - was rejected by the farmer group.

Barnes meanwhile had become aware of the Hutt River Province and seeking to emulate "Prince Leonard" took legal advice and then declared the unilateral secession of his property from the State of Victoria on 23 July 1979. He appointed himself "Governor" of the newly created Independent State of Rainbow Creek, and together with "Minister for Information" George Downing, swore allegiance to Queen Elizabeth II of the United Kingdom as his Head of State. His secession document was lodged with the Victorian Governor, the Governor-General of Australia, Buckingham Palace and the International Court of Justice in The Hague.

Public attention was again focused on Cowwarr, and the existence of the State of Rainbow Creek ensured that Barnes remained a thorn in the side of the SRWSC and the Victorian Government for a number of years, as he issued passports, stamps, banknotes and other printed material to promote the cause of his farming community.

Ill health eventually forced Barnes to retire to Queensland in the mid-1980s, from where he has since published several books of local history and poetry, whilst the issues that led to the Rainbow Creek secession remained unresolved.
