= Donnelly's Creek =

Coordinates: 37.75°S 146.44°E

Donnelly's Creek was a gold rush town located in the mountains of Gippsland, Victoria, Australia, approximately 40 kilometres north of Walhalla. In its heyday it was home to over 1,200 miners and other residents. Today the town is deserted; however, it still attracts many four-wheel-drive and mining enthusiasts.

== History ==
Donnelly's Creek was named after John Donnelly, the leader of a party of miners who discovered gold there in August 1862. The other members of his group included Soloman Chalmers and a miner by the name of De Crocket.

Donnelly and De Crocket left the creek to register the claim in Sale. In the meantime, Chalmers went back to the gold-mining town of Jericho to obtain tools and supplies. On Chalmers' return he was followed by four miners who jumped half of the Donnelly group's claim. Despite appeals to the authorities, they were unsuccessful in regaining control of the ground because of legal technicalities. In the meantime the publicity attracted more miners to the area, who quickly pegged out the entire creek. The claims returned an average of one ounce per man per claim per day. (In 1866 Donnelly and his two mates finally received a reward of £650 from the Victorian Government Gold Reward Board for the discovery.)

By the end of 1862 the source of the alluvial gold found in the creek had been uncovered. Four reefs were found, the most prominent of these was named Edwards' Reef, after George Edwards. Mining continued in the area until 1911, when the last mine – the White Star – closed. By 1922 the region had been all but forgotten; however, it was worked by scattered individual prospectors up until the outbreak of World War 2.

Since then, the area has been mostly used for outdoor recreation: four-wheel driving, fishing, and camping. In February 2013, fires destroyed four shelter huts in the area from Donnelly's Creek to Aberfeldy.

== Mining ==
The four main reefs found at Donnelly's Creek were

- Edwards' Reef, which returned 5,877 oz. of gold from 8,151 tons of quartz
- Crinoline Reef, which yielded 4,938 oz. from 9,893 tons
- White Star Reef, which produced 2,801 oz. from 6,854 tons
- Bismark (United Star) Beef, which crushed 7,424 tons for 11,488 oz. of gold

There were a number of other, smaller mining operations in the district, including the Hit or Miss, Boy's Reef (discovered by a nine-year-old boy, James Frederick Porter), the Nil Desperandum and Watson's Reward.

== See also ==
- Gold mining
