= Jordan River (Victoria) =

Jordan
- Location of the Jordan River mouth in Victoria
- Etymology: After the biblical River Jordan

Location
- Country: Australia
- State: Victoria
- Region: Victorian Alps (IBRA), West Gippsland
- Local government area: Shire of Baw Baw

Physical characteristics
- Source: Great Dividing Range
  - location: near The Springs, south of Woods Point
  - coordinates: 37°36′0″S 146°9′36″E
  - elevation: 1,170 m (3,840 ft)
- Mouth: confluence with the Thomson River
  - location: Thomson Reservoir
  - coordinates: 37°42′14″S 146°19′32″E
  - elevation: 441 m (1,447 ft)
- Length: 22 km (14 mi)
- Discharge
  - location: mouth

Basin features
- River system: West Gippsland catchment
- Reservoir and lakes: Thomson Reservoir

The Jordan River, a perennial river of the West Gippsland catchment, is located in the Alpine region of the Australian state of Victoria.

== Location and features ==
The Jordan River rises near The Springs, south of Woods Point, part of the Great Dividing Range. The headwaters drain a marginal area of the Big River State Forest near Jordan Gap, Jordan Cutting and McAdam Gap. The river flows generally south by east, much of its course through the Thomson State Forest, before reaching its confluence with the Thomson River within the northern reaches of the Thomson Reservoir. The river descends 732 metres (2,402 ft) over its 22-kilometre (14 mi) course.

The Victorian Department of Primary Industries describes the river as:

A small (5-metre (16 ft) wide) clear, fast-flowing stream running through steep forested country, rock and gravel bottom. Access limited to road crossings and forestry tracks.

== European history ==
The Jordan Valley was intensively mined for gold during the latter half of the 19th and early 20th centuries. As supplies were erratic and high prices were being charged, a group of businessmen from Sale posted a reward in early 1862 to cut a reliable supply track into the Jordan goldfields. Claims were made by Thomas McEvoy, Fred Porter, Archie Campbell and William Anderson, with McEvoy's Track awarded the main prize money and being the one used by most carters and miners.

Several sites from this era, including the Jordan River Diversion Tunnel, are listed in the Victorian Heritage Inventory.

The Thomson Valley - Mount Shillinglaw section of the Australian Alps Walking Track follows the Jordan River for part of its length.

== Etymology ==
The Jordan River was named after the biblical River Jordan (Hebrew: meaning "descending") by Owen Little in 1861 because access was "a hard road to travel". Christie mentions a report in the Gippsland Times that miners thought the tree ferns further down the river reminded them of palm trees in bible illustrations, hence also the Jericho goldfield, as Jericho was "the city of palm trees" (Joshua 34:3).

== See also ==
- List of rivers of Australia § Victoria
