= Thomson River (Victoria) =

Thomson
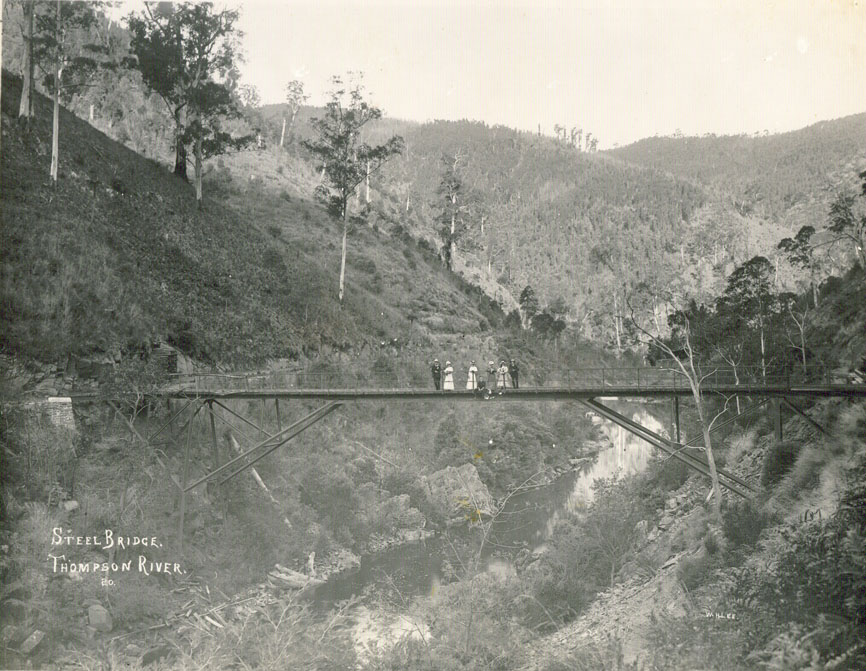
- A bridge over the Thomson River, pictured in 1910

- Location of the Thomson River mouth in Victoria
- Etymology: In honour of Sir Edward Thomson
- Native name: Tambo (Kurnai); Carrang-carrang (Kurnai); Carran-carran (Kurnai)

Location
- Country: Australia
- State: Victoria
- Region: South East Coastal Plain (IBRA), West Gippsland
- Local government area: Shire of Wellington
- Settlements: Heyfield, Sale

Physical characteristics
- Source: Baw Baw Plateau, Great Dividing Range
  - location: near Newlands
  - coordinates: 37°44′45″S 146°10′42″E
  - elevation: 972 m (3,189 ft)
- Mouth: confluence with the Latrobe River
  - location: near Sale
  - coordinates: 38°8′45″S 147°5′11″E
  - elevation: 2 m (6 ft 7 in)
- Length: 170 km (110 mi)
- Basin size: 10,855.2 km^{2} (4,191.2 mi^{2})
- Discharge
  - location: Near mouth
  - average: 102.05 m^{3}/s (3,220 GL/a)

Basin features
- River system: West Gippsland catchment
- Tributaries
  - left: Matlock Creek, Jordan River, Aberfeldy River, Stringers Creek, Lammers Creek, Stoney Creek, Macalister River

The Thomson River, a perennial river of the West Gippsland catchment, is located in the Gippsland region of the Australian state of Victoria.

== Location and features ==
The Thomson River rises below Newlands at the north western end of the Baw Baw Plateau of the Great Dividing Range, where it shares a watershed with the Yarra and Tanjil rivers. From its source, the river flows generally north, then east, then south southeast through its impoundment, then southeast, then east, and finally east by south, joined by seventeen tributaries including the Jordan, Aberfeldy, and Macalister rivers, before reaching its confluence with the Latrobe River near Sale. The river descends 970 metres (3,180 ft) over its 170-kilometre (110 mi) course.

The Thomson Valley was intensively mined for gold during the latter half of the 19th and early 20th centuries. Prospector "Ned" Stringer discovered significant quantities of alluvial gold at the junction of what is now known as Stringers Creek. A short distance up that creek the gold mining township of Walhalla was established. The first person to walk the entire length of the river was Ronald Le Sage, father of David Le Sage, who explored its viability for a cattle droving route in 1959.

The river is impounded not far below its source by the Thomson Dam, creating Thomson Reservoir. The reservoir provides around 70% of Melbourne's water storage and supplies about 30% of Melbourne's water needs. This takes about 50% of the river's natural flow, which places a great environmental stress downstream. It particularly affects the Gippsland Lakes, which include Lake Wellington, Lake Victoria and Lake King. This area has international significance as a Ramsar listed wetland site.

Near the town of Cowwarr it is also impounded on a smaller scale at the Cowwarr Weir, supplying water for an irrigated farming district. Immediately below the Cowwarr Weir, the river has since the 1950s split into two channels, with the newer southern channel known as Rainbow Creek. Rainbow Creek was formed in June 1952 after floodwaters were blocked by a bridge on the Thomson River's main channel and cut a new path, which rejoins the original channel a few kilometres downstream. It has since been widened and deepened by subsequent floods, becoming a permanent waterway cutting through existing farms. Conflict between farmers and the state government regarding land rates paid on land affected by the new waterway led to the establishment of a micronation known as the Independent State of Rainbow Creek in the late 1970s.

=== Diversion tunnel ===
The 170-metre (560 ft) Victorian heritage-listed diversion tunnel is located on the river near its junction with Coopers Creek (and the locality of Platina), approximately 4 kilometres (2.5 mi) south-west of Walhalla. Tunnelling commenced in August 1911 and was completed around October 1912; making the diversion tunnel one of thirteen river diversions surviving from the Victorian gold rush.

== Etymology ==
In the Aboriginal Brataualung language the river is given two names: Tambo, with no defined meaning, and Carrang-carrang or Carrang-carrang, meaning "brackish water".

The river was given its English name in 1840 by the colonial pastoralist, Angus McMillan, in honour of Sir Edward Thomson, the Chief Secretary of the Colony of New South Wales, based in Sydney.

== See also ==
- List of rivers of Australia § Victoria
