= Walhalla, Victoria =

Town in Australia

Walhalla
- Town
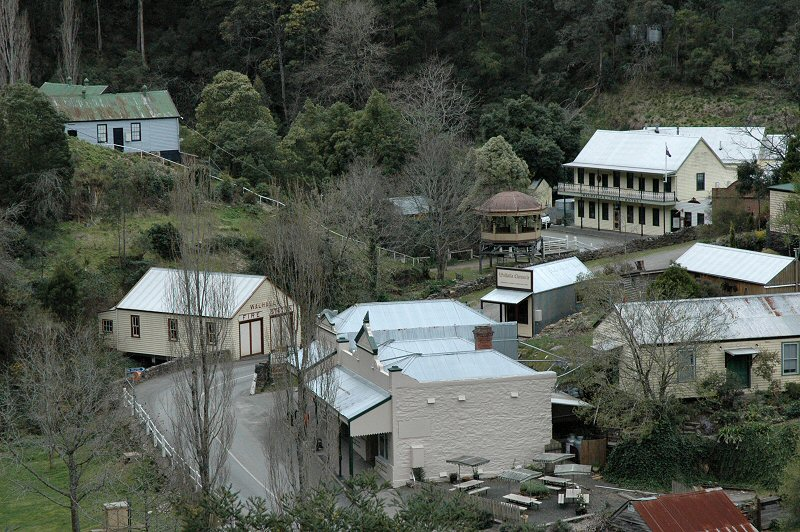
- View of part of Walhalla, showing mainly reconstructed buildings, including the Star Hotel/Oddfellows Hall and several original structures including the band rotunda, Corner Stores and Masonic Lodge.

- Coordinates: 37°56′37″S 146°27′03″E
- Country: Australia
- State: Victoria
- LGA: Shire of Baw Baw
- Location: 182 km (113 mi) E of Melbourne; 49 km (30 mi) NE of Moe

Government
  - State electorate: Narracan
  - Federal division: Monash
- Elevation: 360 m (1,180 ft)

Population
  - Total: 35 (2021 census)
- Postcode: 3825

Walhalla is a town in Victoria, Australia, founded as a gold-mining community in late 1862, and at its peak, home to around 4,000 residents. As of 2023, the town has a population of 20 permanent residents, though it has a large proportion of houses owned as holiday properties. It attracts large numbers of tourists and is a major focus of the regional tourism industry. The town's name is taken from an early gold mine in the area, named for the German hall of fame, the Walhalla temple (Valhalla from Norse sagas).

== Geography ==
Walhalla is located toward the south-eastern corner of Australia, in the state of Victoria's eastern region, Gippsland, about 180 kilometres from the state capital Melbourne. It is located in the Great Dividing Range, in the steep Stringers Creek valley, approximately four kilometres upstream of the creek's junction with the Thomson River. The area around the town is designated as a historic area, adjoining the Baw Baw National Park.

The township is mainly located along one road which winds along the valley floor due to the steep terrain. After the 52-year mining period ended in December 1914, Walhalla's population declined rapidly; the town and surrounding area lost its status as the Shire of Walhalla in 1918. For the latter part of the 20th century fewer than 20 people lived in the town as permanent residents.

== History ==
=== Discovery of gold ===
The history of Walhalla is closely linked to the history of gold in Victoria. The first gold had been found in Victoria in 1851, leading to the Victorian gold rush. By 1859 prospectors had pushed far east of Melbourne into the trackless wilderness of the Great Dividing Range. Major gold strikes on the Jordan River encouraged other prospectors to follow the nearby Thomson River in their search for the valuable metal.

A group of four prospectors who had been exploring in creeks flowing into the Thomson River valley found gold in late December 1862. A claim was pegged out and a member of this group, former convict Edward Stringer, registered the claim at the stage post town of Bald Hills, now called Seaton, about 12 January 1863. Although his party were later posthumously presented with a monetary reward of £100 for the discovery, Stringer was unable to capitalise on his finds, dying in September 1863. After news of the discovery became known, a rush to the creek began and a small town sprang up, The settlement was initially called Stringer's or Stringer's Creek, but after the township was surveyed it was later rechristened Walhalla – the name of the town's largest mine at that time. The creek running through town still bears his name.

Access to the creek was an ongoing problem in the town's early days owing to the goldfield's remote and inaccessible location. In February 1863, two prospectors John Hinchcliffe and William Myers, discovered an immensely rich quartz outcrop in the hill just above the creek, which was named Cohen's Reef, after a storekeeper at Bald Hills.

=== Mining operations ===
Gold panning and related techniques quickly exhausted all the alluvial (surface) deposits. By late 1863 mining operations began as prospectors sought and then followed the underground veins of gold. At Walhalla this could mean tunnelling into the steep valley walls as well as the more traditional digging downward.

The vast majority of gold extraction from Walhalla centred on Cohens Reef, the largest single reef in Victoria. By 1900 the reef had already produced around 55 tonnes of gold (approximately 1.8 million troy ounces, worth around US$790 million in 2005).

Due to the enormous expenses of underground gold mining, small claims operated by individuals or small groups soon folded, being replaced by large companies such as the Long Tunnel Mining Company. This company owned the richest mine working the reef, the Long Tunnel, which produced over 30 tons of gold alone over its operation between the years 1865 and 1914, and paid £1,283,000 in dividends to its shareholders.

The crushing machinery used to extract the gold from the quartz-based ore required large amounts of energy, supplied largely by wood-burning steam engines. The need for fuel wood led to the hills being denuded for some considerable distance around town, timber tramways bringing freshly cut timber for the boilers. The associated costs of bringing wood from further and further away were a key factor in the economic problems which eventually ended mining in Walhalla.

=== Boom period: 1863–1900 ===
By late 1863 there had been more finds made nearby at Happy-Go-Lucky, three kilometres from Stringer's Creek, and at Cooper's Creek, where copper was later to be discovered in even greater abundance. By March 1864, Walhalla had a weekly mail service from Toongabbie, and the Walhalla Post Office was opened on 22 August 1864 (known as Stringer's Creek until 1868). Happy-Go-Lucky had a post office open from 1865 until 1916, as did Cooper's Creek from 1868 until 1893.

The first hotel, the Reefer's Arms, was opened in September 1863. In time, there were more than a dozen hotels, breweries and an aerated waters factory. A branch of the Bank of Victoria was opened in September 1865, and a branch of the Bank of Australasia was opened in February 1866. Shopkeepers, publicans and other traders built the town up quickly in support of the rush.

By May 1866, the township of Stringer's Creek had been surveyed and renamed Walhalla, after one of the most prosperous mines then working. Most of the first lots of township land were sold to the already-resident householders. That year saw a church building was erected for the Wesleyan Church, and establishment of a Police reserve and Court of Petty Sessions.

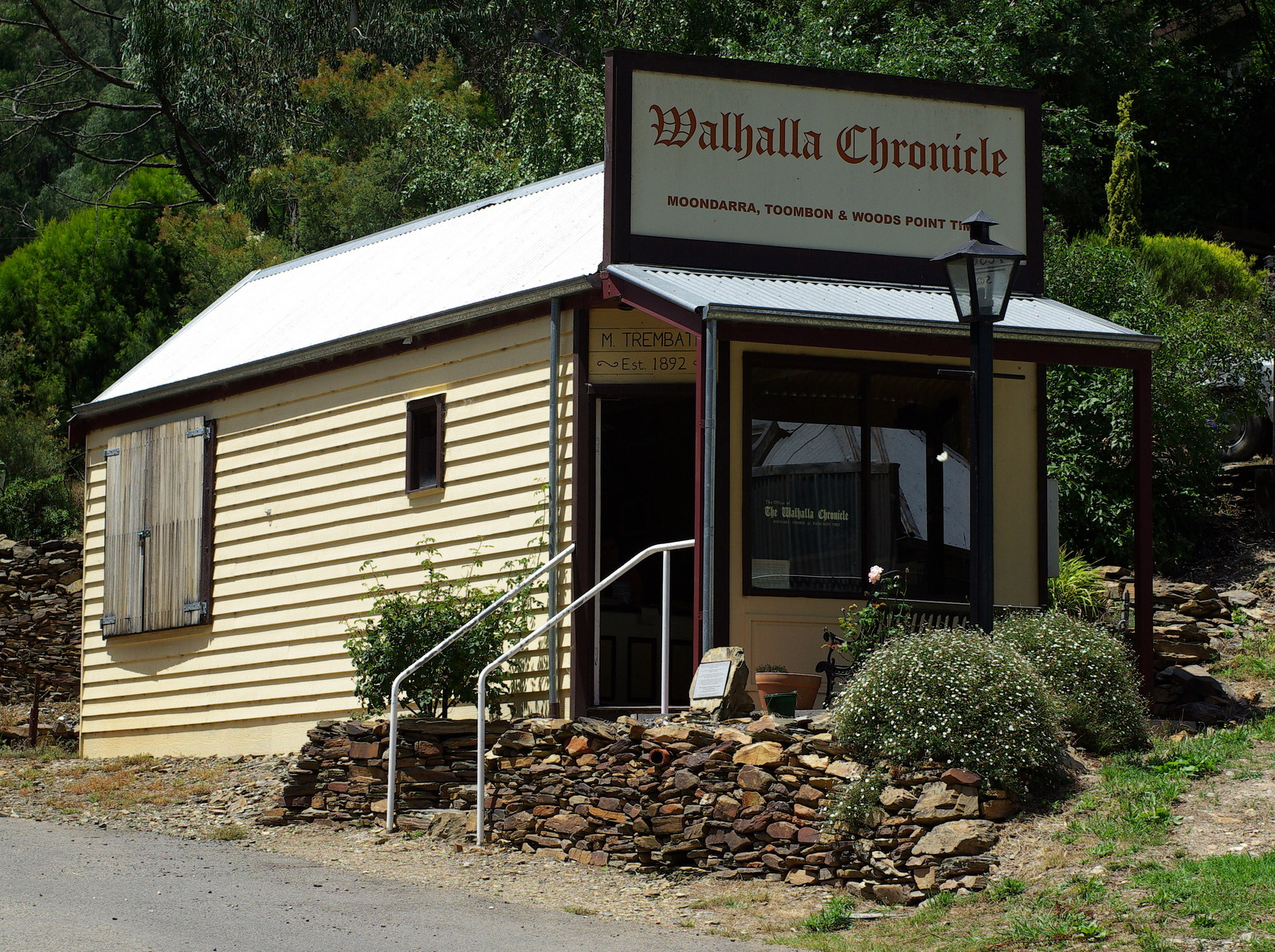
A reconstruction of a former shop, which now houses a small museum highlighting the Walhalla Chronicle newspaper

The growing number of families in the area saw the Mechanics' Institute and Free Library also serving as a school when it opened in 1867. Before long, Walhalla could boast fraternal societies, a debating club, and (briefly at least) a chess club, choral union and dramatic club. By January 1870, the Walhalla Chronicle newspaper was being published, and by December of the same year, a two-acre (0.8 ha) site had been gazetted for State School No. 957, which had taken its first enrolments in 1868.

A self-appointed "Council of Ten" sought registration as a Borough in 1869, but dissolved without the necessary public support for rating the town's properties before it could accomplish much more than commissioning the construction of the stone retaining wall that still stands today in the centre of town. A Borough was eventually proclaimed in late 1872, and by 1878 was able to successfully agitate with the state government for the completion of the first section of the present main road from Moe. By the end of 1879, Walhalla had daily coach services connecting it to the railway line at Moe to the south and to Traralgon to the east, and its isolation had been considerably reduced.

In late December 1874 a visitor recorded an account of Walhalla. He described the township as consisting “of a street about a mile long, situated at the foot of the mountains, with ranges running up almost perpendicular from south-east and west, and the first impression a visitor receives is that the houses are a number of birds' nests situated in the branches of trees, for they are built on the side of the ranges in every conceivable position”.

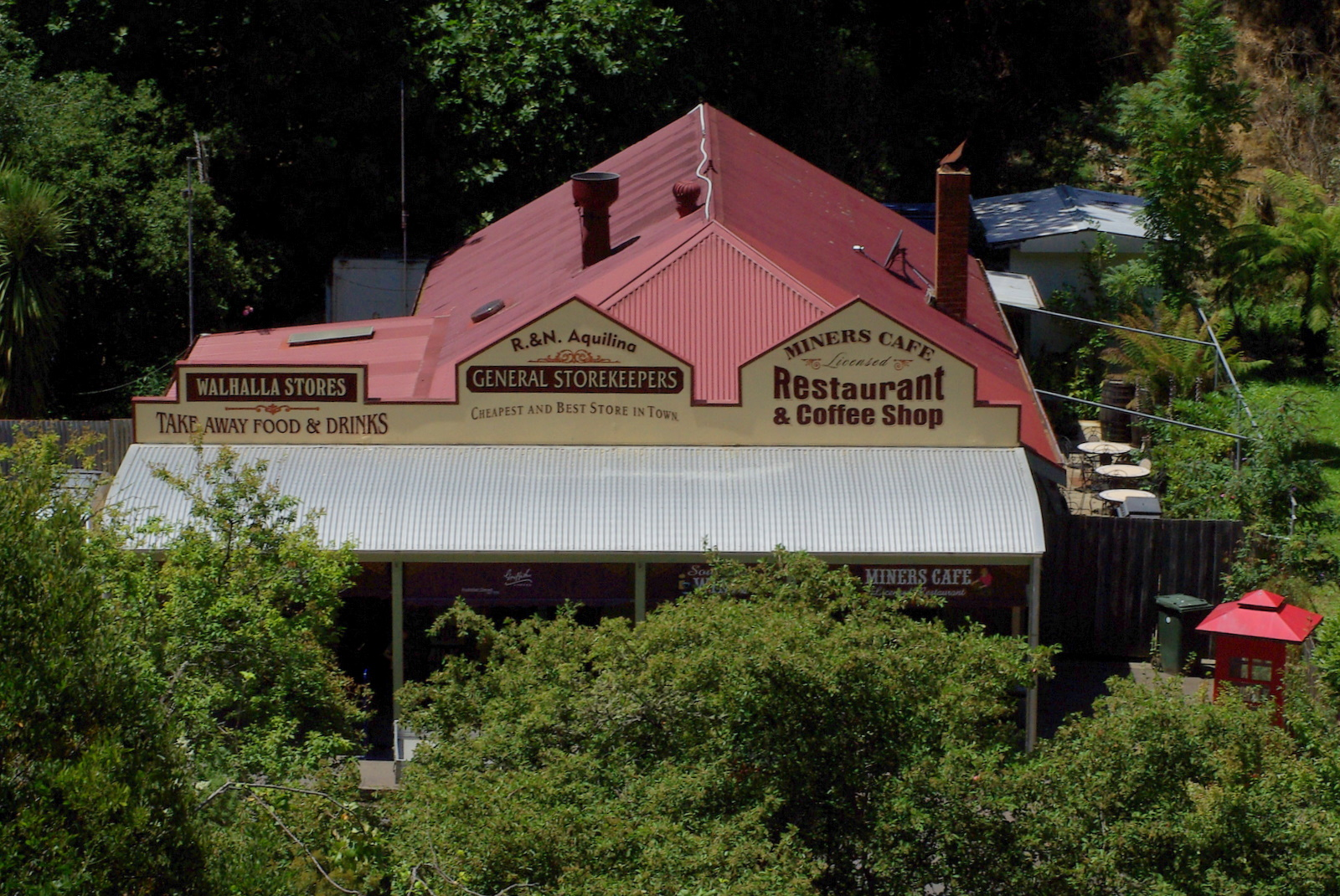
A general store and modern café

The Long Tunnel Company introduced both electricity (1884) and the telephone (1891) into the mine. Although Walhalla briefly led the world in having two electric street lights in 1884, this service was never extended further into the town. But the community continued to grow, with houses and gardens lining the hillsides along the valley, to a peak population of more than 2,000 with more than that many again living in the surrounding mountain-top "suburbs" of Maiden Town, Mormon Town, Happy Go Lucky and Pig Point. Sporting activities included cricket and football clubs, with a cricket ground being created through levelling the top of a nearby hill as no other flat land was available. The Walhalla Football Association operated at the cricket ground between 1888 and 1913.

=== Poverty Point ===
The Italian community made a substantial contribution to the development of Walhalla, working a number of jobs including mine managers, wood cutters and splitters, farmers, miners and mine labourers, merchants and builders. The first Italian residents to settle down in the area came in 1873, when Pietro Bombardieri opened a tram station at the bottom of Little Joe Hill. They quickly proved themselves hardy and resourceful countrymen, particularly with their farming skills, and by 1882 were represented in the town's business community when Anthony Simonin opened the Alpine Hotel. Their two neighbourhoods, one extending along the Long Tunnel Extended tramway to the north, and the other in the southern end of town, peaked around 1910.

The wood cutters and splitters among them would set up camp in bark huts close to the area they were working, and it seems they rarely came into town. Around the turn of the century several of these families took up land at a remote station along the Thomson River to the north west, which was called Poverty Point.

=== End of mining and decades of decline: 1915–1980 ===
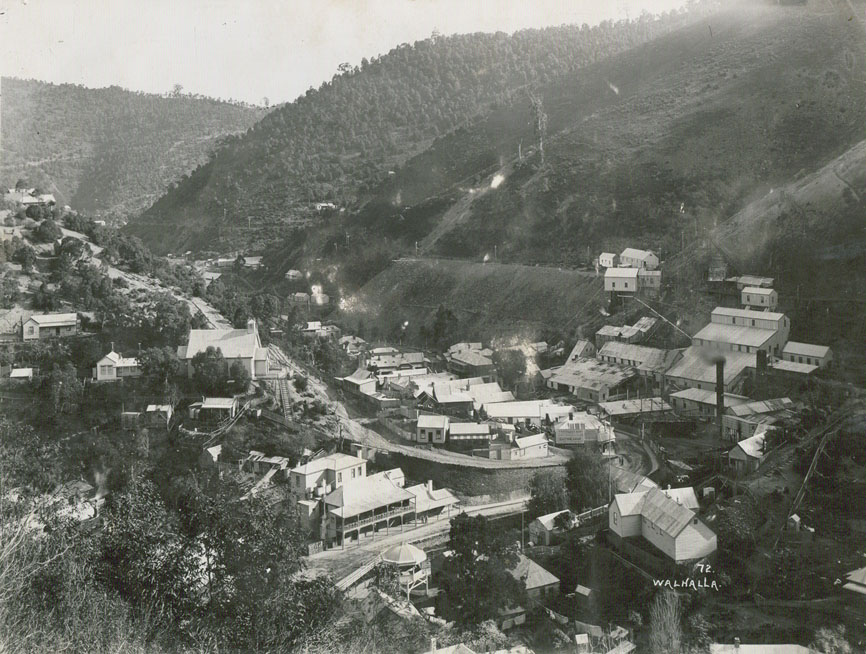
Walhalla township in 1910

After many years of lobbying from business interests, the Victorian government eventually agreed to the construction of a rail line into town. The line was completed into Walhalla in 1910, the last of four narrow gauge (760 mm or 2 ft 6 in) railways built by the Victorian Railways. The seventeen small 2-6-2 NA-class tank engines which operated were interchanged between the four lines. The six remaining NA-class locomotives are owned by Puffing Billy Railway near Melbourne—five of which are preserved and operating. Branching from the main Gippsland line at Moe, the Walhalla line crossed hilly farming country, until it reached the town of Erica where it entered heavily mountainous territory, crossing the Thomson River by means of a large steel and concrete bridge then snaking up Stringer's Creek Gorge over a track featuring ledges blasted from sheer rock faces, dry stone walls built rising from the creek bed, and six timber trestle bridges and brackets within the last few hundred metres into town.

It was hoped that the railway would bring new life back into the community, however gold mining was already becoming largely unprofitable and the last of the major mines closed in 1914. With the disappearance of the main industry in town, the bulk of the population soon left. The Shire of Walhalla was incorporated into the neighbouring Shire of Narracan in 1918.

One of the railway's main uses became the removal of old buildings out of town, with the original railway station being relocated in 1938 to Hartwell in suburban Melbourne. In 1944, the section from Platina to Walhalla was closed, with the small copper and lime producing settlement of Coopers Creek using Platina as a supply point until the section of line between Platina & Erica closed in 1952. The service from Moe to Erica continued to service the farming and timber industries of the area, but it gradually decreased in patronage, until it too was closed in 1954. The line was dismantled late in 1958.

A sawmill operated on the site of the former Long Tunnel Mine yard (now Stringer's Park) from 1949 until 1971. The Corner Stores opposite the mill was used as a barracks for mill workers and was in a poor state of disrepair when purchased by the Walhalla Heritage League in the early 1970s.

Efforts to re-establish mining activities continued between 1915 and the early 1940s, though these were small scale operations producing only small amounts of gold. The town never became a ghost town and has been continuously inhabited with the population supporting basic facilities such as post office, hotel, church, general store and masonic lodge.

On 10 March 1942 a Curtiss P-40 Warhawk of the United States Army Air Force flown by Captain Joseph P McLaughlin crashed near Walhalla on a flight from Canberra to Laverton. It was discovered in 1948. In 2006 his remains were buried at Arlington National Cemetery.

In 1945, the Mechanics Institute, Bank of Australasia and St Patricks Catholic Church were destroyed by a fire started by a State Lands Department employee who was burning off invasive blackberries, and embers spread to the Mechanics Institute. The Star Hotel, Oddfellows Hall and Walhalla Shire Hall were also destroyed in December 1951 due to the use of the wrong fuel in the kitchen's ovens while making Christmas puddings in the Star Hotel, then owned by Arthur Malley. Malley was a descendant of Alice and Daniel Barber who owned Barbers Restaurant and Boarding House in west Walhalla from the early 1860s, and died in Collingwood, Victoria in 1957 (aged 66 years) before being able to return to rebuild. The school closed in 1965 and further floods and neglect slowly degraded the remains of the town. The last buildings lost to fire in Walhalla were Foley's Cottage behind the old fire station in 1993, (fire was caused by a candle), and Cumings Cottage—an original miner's home above the tramway on the western side, destroyed during a major bushfire in February 2019.

=== Resurgence: 1980–present ===
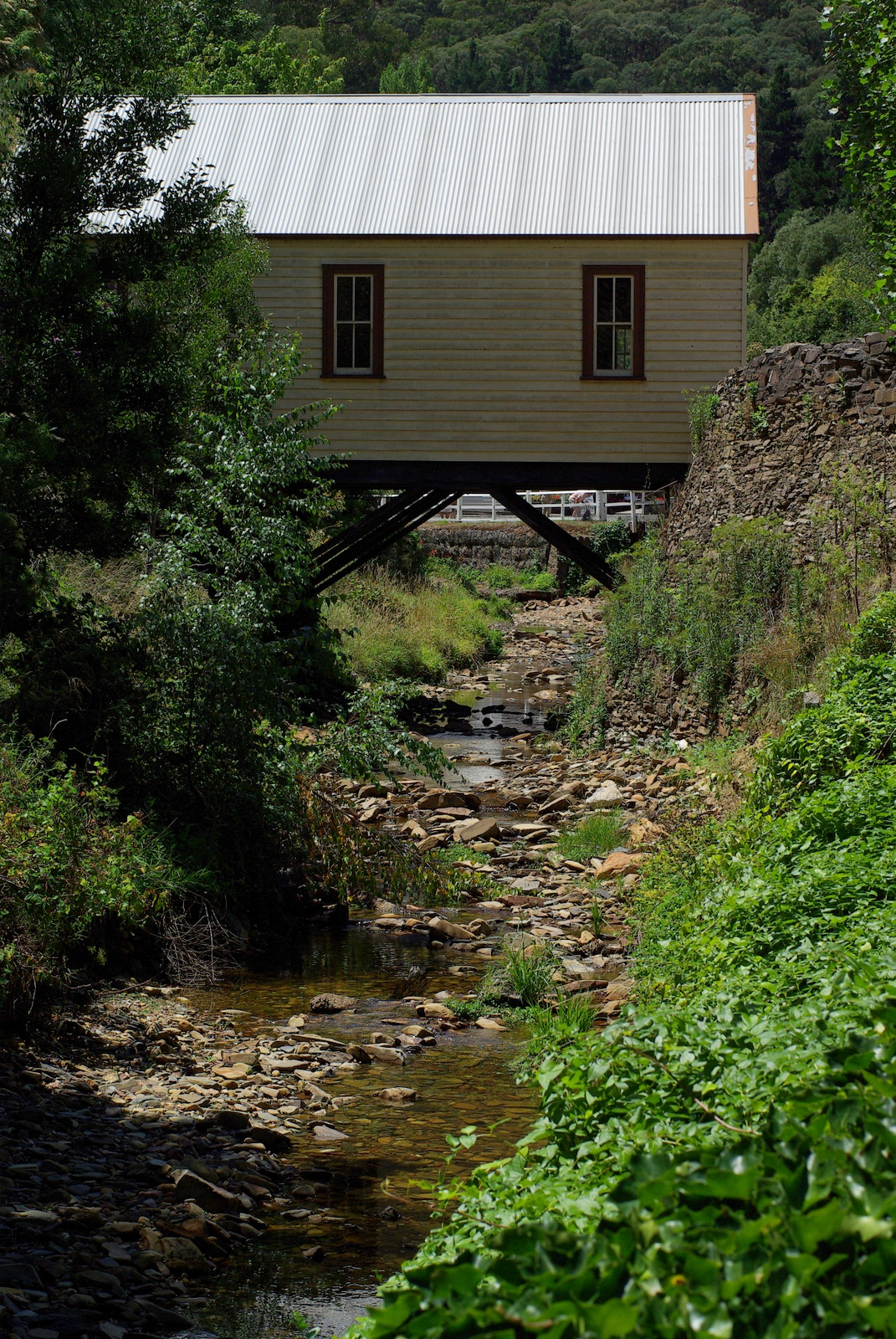
The restored original fire station, built over Stringer's Creek.

Since around 1977, Walhalla has experienced something of a renaissance with a booming tourist industry and the restoration or reconstruction of numerous historical buildings in the town, including the Star Hotel, Mechanics Institute and reconstruction of the Thomson–Walhalla section of the former narrow-gauge railway.

Following amalgamation of local government in Victoria in 1994, the Walhalla and Erica/Rawson areas were placed under the control of the distant Baw Baw Shire at Warragul, 80 km to the west. Despite strong local representation pointing out the much closer proximity and strong historical, social and economic linkages to the neighbouring Latrobe Valley cities of Moe, Morwell and Traralgon, the then Kennett Liberal/National Coalition Government elected to place Walhalla in Baw Baw.

The Gold Era Shops were restored by the Walhalla Heritage League and now operate as a Post Office, museum and gift shop.

In 1991, a group of interested parties formed a taskforce to investigate reconstruction of the Walhalla railway as a tourist attraction, something which had been unsuccessfully attempted on at least one other occasion previously. Work by the newly formed Walhalla Goldfields Railway commenced in 1993 at the former Thomson Station site, situated next to the Thomson River immediately before the bridge. With the restoration of the Thomson River Bridge, trains began to take tourists back up the Stringer's Creek Gorge, with a temporary terminus being created at Happy Creek due to the need for reconstruction of the timber trestle bridges completing the journey into town.

This terminus was the end point for tourist trains from Thomson Bridge from 1996 until 2002, when the line was opened through to the old station site at Walhalla. The current station building is an exact replica of the original, although the yard layout is considerably different owing to a section of the former station's location having been covered by earlier road deviation works of the main road into Walhalla.

In December 1998, Walhalla became the last mainland town in Australia to be connected to a reticulated electricity supply, although some other towns do not have mains electricity yet, such as Licola nearby, they do have a central generator unit that supplies the community. Walhalla was unusual in that every individual property wishing to have their own electricity supply had to provide their own generator. It was illegal to reticulate electricity (even to a next door neighbour) without permission from the (former) S.E.C.V. (State Electricity Commission of Victoria). The S.E.C.V. had half heartedly considered connecting Walhalla to the grid in the early 1970s, however this never proceeded due to the S.E.C.V. not really being interested, and the then town population being concerned that power poles and wires in the main street would ruin the heritage look and feel of Walhalla. The privatisation of electricity in the mid-1990s provided the opportunity for Walhalla to be reconsidered for connection with Eastern Energy (owned by TXU) undertaking a feasibility study. The new proposal was to run the cables entirely underground from nearby Rawson via 4WD tracks and then along the main street. A total of 6,940 metres of cable was laid from Rawson; this is under half the road distance and it cost $640,000 to connect Walhalla to the grid. The Star Hotel was the first to be connected on 16 December with the official switch on held on 21 December.

Several significant attempts have been made resurrect commercial gold mining in the Walhalla area, with Walhalla Resources and Goldstar Resources investing significant amounts in the 1980s and 2002+ respectively. Both companies hoped to use modern mining techniques to access gold bearing ore that was not economically winnable in the town's gold era. In 2008, GoldStar was well advanced to obtaining a mining licence, but the company folded in early 2009 due to lack of funds, in part caused by the 2008 financial crisis. The company was then refloated as Orion Gold NL with a new management team and has adopted a less aggressive approach to restarting gold mining in and around Walhalla. In February 2016, Orion Gold sold its Walhalla tenements to A1 Consolidated Gold Limited (A1 Gold) for $850,000. There is currently no active mining exploration occurring in or around Walhalla.

Walhalla has been impacted by major fire events in 2005, 2006/07, 2009, 2013 and 2019 although the town proper has not sustained any damage from bushfire although a small rail bridge on the Walhalla Goldfields Railway was destroyed in the 2006/07 fire and quickly rebuilt and one cottage was lost in the February 2019 fire. A new CFA fire station was opened in Walhalla on 24 November 2013. This is the fifth location for the fire brigade over the town's 150-year history and is a satellite of the Erica and District Fire Brigade as the Walhalla Fire Brigade was deregistered in 1961. This is the second official fire station in Walhalla for 112 years. The first was the station that straddles the creek which was built in 1901 which is now a museum and houses the restored 1903 Merryweather Fire Cart.

In October 2016, Michael Leaney, a long time Walhalla resident, business owner and community advocate, was elected to Baw Baw Shire Council to represent the newly created East Ward of the Shire. This ward is nearly 3,200 square kilometres in size with Walhalla being the most remote town in the shire accessible via a sealed road. 50 years had passed since Walhalla has had a representative on council. Phil Mouritz, the owner of the [then] Walhalla Lodge Hotel was a councillor for the Shire of Narracan in the mid 1960s.

On Sunday 3 February 2019 Walhalla was directly threatened by bushfire. A fire that had been started by a lightning strike five days earlier to the east of the town was burning away from the town in a south easterly direction when an unexpected easterly wind caused the front to the fire to burn rapidly to the west. The town had been essentially evacuated during the day with only a handful of residents remaining and a CFA Strike Team. At 5:23pm the town's fire siren was sounded, and two hours later the flames were visible on the ridge to the east of the town near Maidentown. More firefighting resources were rushed to Walhalla as numerous spot fires started on the east and west sides of the valley. At 8:37pm rain started to fall and by 9:45pm over 15 mm of rain had fallen essentially quelling the fire. One cottage was lost in Walhalla [on the western hillside north of the Long Tunnel Extended Mine], and five buildings were destroyed in Maidentown. The Walhalla-Stoney Creek Road Fire was active for over five weeks and burnt 8775 hectares.

Mobile phone coverage came to Walhalla on 16 July 2019 with the official switch-on of a Telstra tower, the 600th tower to be commissioned under the Black Spot Program. The community had campaigned for almost ten years to get mobile phone coverage into the valley which posed a number of technically difficulties due to the steep topography.

In October 2020 Michael Leaney was re-elected for a second term with Baw Baw Shire and in November 2021 he was elected Mayor. He is the first Mayor from Walhalla since 1918.

Major flood damage occurred following storms on the night of 9/10 June, 2021 when 204 mm of rain fell in a 12 hour period. The deluge lead to substantial damage to the creek walling in several area throughout the township. The North Gardens Camping area was severely impacted when debris blocked the creek flow at the access bridge causing flood waters to pour through the camping area eroding the creek bank. Further downstream, the road edge was impacted near Valhalla House, the Star Hotel and the CFA shed near the Walhalla Lodge Hotel as the creek wall was swept away. The Walhalla Goldfields Railway sustained damage to bridges. Community donations assisted with the costs of the railway's repairs in the following weeks so services could recommence. Repairs to creek walling was conducted by Regional Roads Victoria and was completed by July 2022.

== Landmarks and tourist information ==
As well as historical buildings, the township features many mines and mineshafts, and the mountainous terrain is popular with hikers and bushwalkers. It is the starting point for the 650 km Australian Alps Walking Track, which continues to near Canberra. Walhalla also features two camping grounds; the North Gardens (free) and Chinese Gardens (paid).

The current railway station is an exact replica built to the Victorian Railways plans of the original station building (now located in the Melbourne suburb of Hartwell), although the interior is different from the original configuration. It is on the opposite side of the station yard from its original location because the main road into Walhalla was realigned over the culvert across Stringers Creek in the 1960s. Train rides are operated by the Walhalla Goldfields Railway over the restored section between Walhalla and the Thomson.

The Long Tunnel Extended Mine is open daily for tours underground to view the original gold workings, Cohens line of reef and the impressive machinery chamber carved out of the mountain.

The Walhalla Corner Stores was purchased by the Walhalla Heritage & Development League (WHDL) in the early 1970s and were restored to their original design. The Corner Store now operates as a Post Office agency, shop and Tourist Information Centre with the adjoining shop housing a museum.

Throughout the town, there is a Heritage Walk with over 30 interpretive signs that include photos and text explaining the various sites and buildings of the gold era. These signs were first piloted by the WHDL in 1996 and a grant from the Federation Fund saw a major expansion of the Heritage Walk. Over the years, additional signs have been added including on the 8 km walk to Poverty Point Bridge on the Australian Alps Walking Track. The Walhalla Visitor Map which is available for free in town shows the locations of these signs.

The Walhalla Fire Station was built straddling Stringers Creek and is now open to the public as a museum. It was totally reconstructed in the early 1960s after many years of neglect and the structure seen today has been rebuilt from the floor up.

The Band Rotunda was built at the junction of the left- and right-hand branches of Stringers Creek in 1896, commissioned by the Mountaineer Brass Band, who held a competition for its design. Two hotels were situated opposite the Band Rotunda, the Star Hotel on the north side of the creek fork, and the Grand Junction Hotel on the south side. The original Star Hotel was burnt down by a fire caused by a faulty hot water service in December 1951, but reconstructed in 1999 with a recreation of the original facade.

The American actor Patrick Swayze visited Walhalla in his youth, where he enjoyed exploring the country side and the local history.

In 2024 the movie Ice Road: Vengeance was filmed in Walhalla, doubling for Nepal.

Windsor House was built by German Johannes Gloz between 1878 and 1888 from around 90,000 handmade bricks, the only surviving brick residence in the town. Gloz maintained a vineyard on the slope above the building, producing around 900 bottles of Riesling in the year 1880.

Situated on top of the hill, immediately to the north-east of the junction of the east and west branches of Stringers Creek is the Walhalla Cricket Ground, approximately a 45-minute return hike from the valley floor.

== Long Tunnel Extended Mine ==
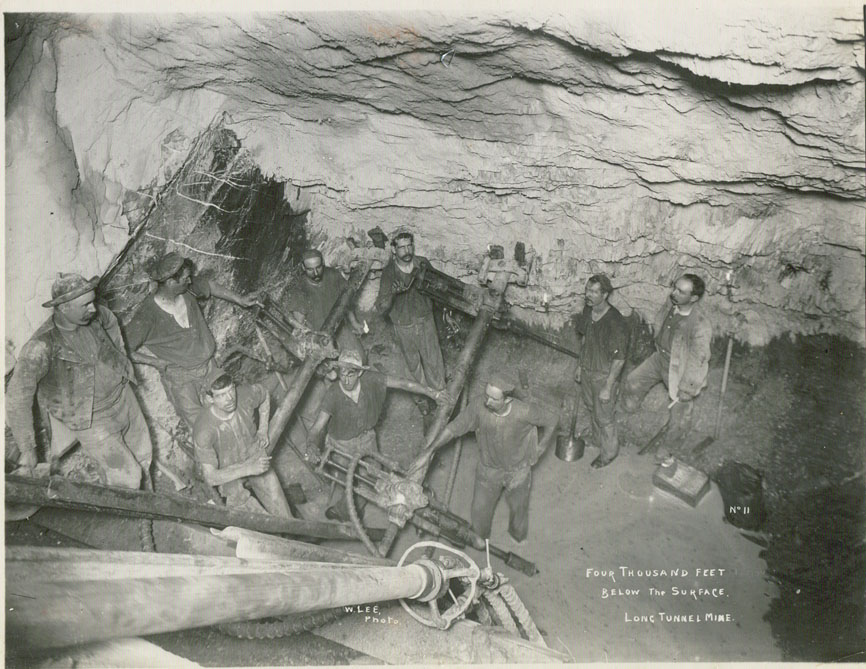
The Long Tunnel Mine about 1910

Long Tunnel Extended Mine (LTEM) was one of the richest mines of Walhalla. The main gold-bearing reef in Walhalla is called Cohens reef. The LTEM mine was started by Hercules United Gold Co. in 1863. After eight years, the company collapsed after not finding any gold. The mine was then taken over by the Long Tunnel Extended Company in 1871. They looked in the opposite direction and found a profitable part of the reef. This mine soon became the second most productive mine in the area (after the Long Tunnel) and in total produced 13,695 kg of gold before it closed in 1911. Overall, the Long Tunnel Extended Mine was Victoria’s fifth largest gold mine during the colonial era.

Today it is operated by the Walhalla Board of Management on behalf of the people of Victoria as a tourist attraction. Underground tours are conducted daily. The mine’s 8.5 kilometres of underground workings extended to a depth of 923 metres below the machinery chamber, which in turn is some 150 metres below natural surface. The tour takes visitors 300 metres into the huge underground machinery chamber hewn from the solid rock over a century ago. Old mining methods are discussed and a large outcrop of the famous Cohens Line of Reef is exposed in the mine.

== Notable residents ==
- William "Barlow" Carkeek, Australian Test Cricketer, was born in Walhalla on 17 October 1878.
- Suzanne Bennett (born Susannah Catherine Evans), was a Broadway actress and singer, and was married to explorer Sir Hubert Wilkins. She was born in Walhalla in 1893.

== Bibliography ==
- Aldersea, John Frank; Hood, Barbara Anne (2003). Walhalla, Valley of Gold: a story of its people, places and its gold mines. Trafalgar, VIC: Walhalla Publishing. ISBN 0-9750887-0-X.
- James, G.F. & Lee, C.G. Walhalla Heyday, Graham Publications, Ringwood, 1970. ISBN 0-9596311-3-5 (a comprehensive pictorial and written history of the old gold town).
- Kiely, John and Savage, Russell, Steam on the Lens: Walhalla Railway Construction, the photographs of Wilf Henty; Vol. 11, Russell Savage, Mildura, 2002, ISBN 0-9581266-0-7 (a second volume pictorial of the construction of the railway into Walhalla during 1908-10. Images taken from large glass negatives).
- Paull, Raymond (new edition, 1980) Old Walhalla: Portrait of a Gold Town, Carlton, Vic: Melbourne University Press, ISBN 0-522-84212-7.
