= Woods Point, Victoria =

Woods Point
- Town
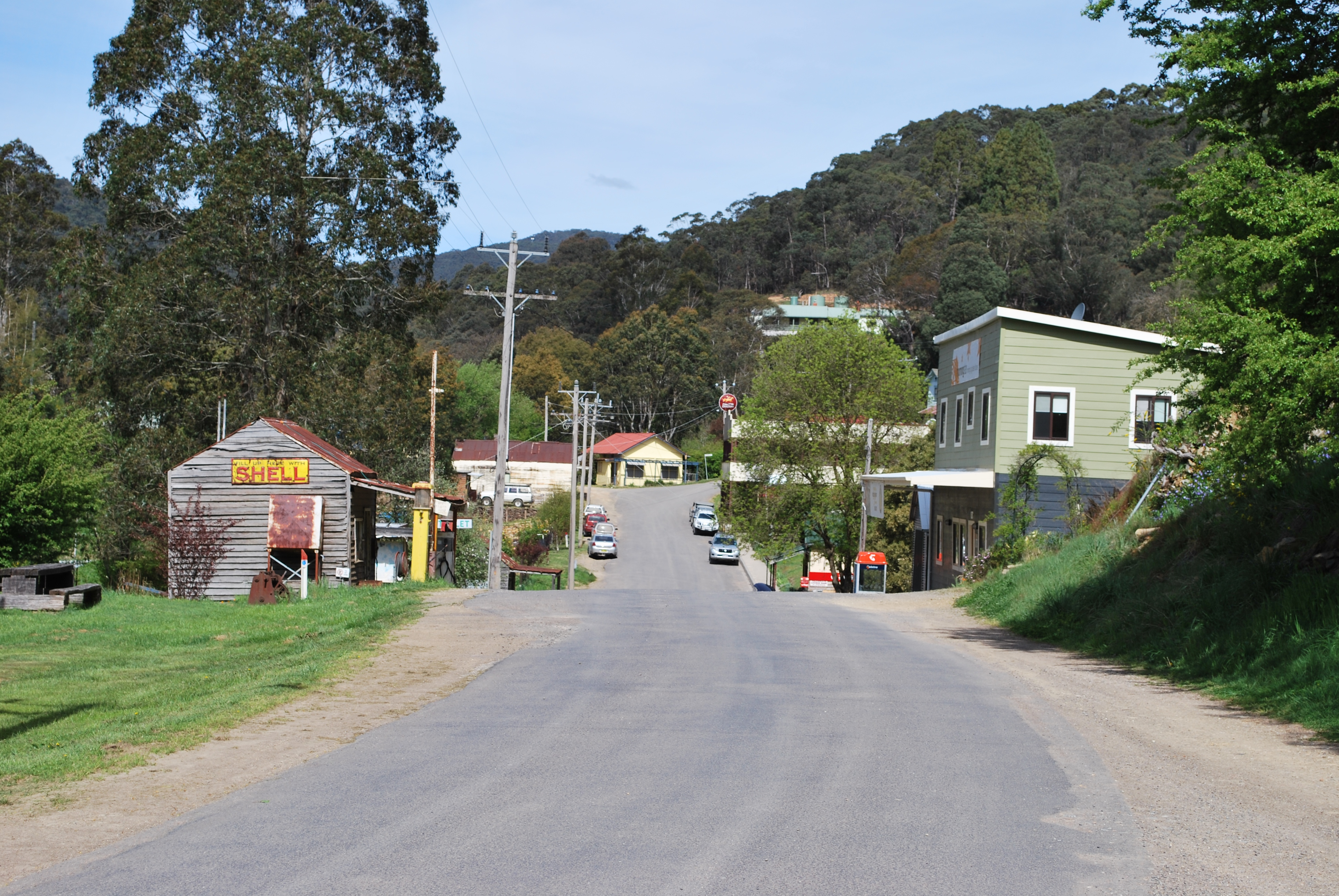
- Bridge Street, the main street of Woods Point

- Coordinates: 37°34′11″S 146°15′15″E
- Country: Australia
- State: Victoria
- Region: Hume
- LGA: Shire of Mansfield
- Location: 179 km (111 mi) NE of Melbourne; 72 km (45 mi) S of Mansfield

Government
  - State electorate: Eildon
  - Federal division: Indi
- Elevation: 680 m (2,230 ft)

Population
  - Total: 33 (2021 census)
- Postcode: 3723
- Mean max temp: 17.0 °C (62.6 °F)
- Mean min temp: 3.5 °C (38.3 °F)
- Annual rainfall: 1,463.6 mm (57.62 in)
Localities around Woods Point
Jamieson	Mount Buller	Mount Buller
Eildon	Woods Point	Licola
McMahons Creek	Erica	Glenmaggie

Woods Point is a town in south-central Victoria, Australia and is located on the banks of the Goulburn River. At the 2021 census, Woods Point and the surrounding area had a population of 33, down from 37 in 2016 census.

== History ==
The town began as a general store built by Henry Wood, to service the gold diggings around the recently discovered Morning Star Reef. Wood's Point Post Office opened on 1 December 1862. By 1864, only three years after the discovery of the gold reef, the area had become a thriving town with 36 hotels. The town was subdivided into numerous suburbs, such as Waverly, Piccadilly, Killarney, Richmond, and Morning Star Hill. Communication was established via a telegraph line to Jamieson, and two local papers were in circulation.

From the 1870s to 1890s, mining activity declined, and the population dropped to between 100 and 200. The mining industry was revived in the 1890s, and the population grew once again, with four hotels servicing the town. Much of the town had to be rebuilt following devastating bushfires in 1939. The Morning Star Mine continued operations until its closure in 1963.

Woods Point, due in part to its terrain, has on many occasions been threatened by bush fires. Most notably in 1939 when the town was completely decimated. In 2006 it was severely threatened but remained unharmed, whilst neighbouring town Gaffney's Creek lost a number of houses. In 2009 the town was threatened again by the "Black Saturday" fires, although the town emerged unscathed. The neighbouring town of Marysville wasn't as fortunate.

The Woods Point Magistrates' Court closed on 1 November 1981, not having been visited by a Magistrate since 1970. Woods Point Primary School closed on 31 December 1998.

The general store in Woods Point closed its doors in late 2010 and a smaller version opened down the main street, just over the bridge. This store facilitates small grocery sales while the Commercial Hotel covers the unleaded fuel sales for motorbikes.

On 22 September 2021 at just after 9:15am, an earthquake with magnitude 5.9 struck near Woods Point, approximately 10 km (6.2 mi) below the surface. The earthquake was felt across the nation, including in Adelaide, Canberra and Launceston. Although this was the largest earthquake ever recorded in Victoria, it did not cause any significant damage in Woods Point.

== Location and features ==
The town now serves as a hub for recreational trail-bike and off-road four-wheel drive activities and contains one hotel and one general store/petrol station (which has closed down), Mini Golf course, tennis court and many camping areas, the most popular being J. H. Scott Reserve. There are two gold mines still active in the area surrounding the town. The town is still only accessible by dirt roads but has recently gained Telstra mobile service due to the government's "black spot" program. Two bus services service the town: a once daily private mail bus and a weekly return Public Transport Victoria bus running to Mansfield. The PTV service is covered under the fare cap scheme. These routes allow access to Mansfield services and connecting V/Line buses to Melbourne and Mount Buller.

Morning Star, a publicly listed company, was operating the Morning Star mine, as well as other nearby projects, until it was placed into receivership in 2015. As at 2020, it was owned by AuStar Gold Ltd.

A.1 Mine, just 20 mins out of town is also currently in operation by Kaiser Reef Ltd (2020).

== Climate ==
At an elevation of 680 m (2,230 ft) and latitude of 37.6 °S, Woods Point is one of the coldest localites in Australia. Summer daytime temperatures are generally mild to warm, but with very cold mornings; winters are cold and very wet, with regular snowfalls that are often heavy.

Climate data for Woods Point (1950–1969, rainfall 1991–2020); 680 m AMSL; 37.57° S, 146.25° E
Month	Jan	Feb	Mar	Apr	May	Jun	Jul	Aug	Sep	Oct	Nov	Dec	Year
Record high °C (°F)	37.2 (99.0)	39.4 (102.9)	36.1 (97.0)	29.4 (84.9)	23.9 (75.0)	17.8 (64.0)	17.8 (64.0)	21.1 (70.0)	27.8 (82.0)	29.4 (84.9)	33.3 (91.9)	35.6 (96.1)	39.4 (102.9)
Mean daily maximum °C (°F)	25.6 (78.1)	25.1 (77.2)	23.0 (73.4)	17.5 (63.5)	12.5 (54.5)	10.2 (50.4)	8.8 (47.8)	10.3 (50.5)	13.4 (56.1)	16.3 (61.3)	19.2 (66.6)	22.2 (72.0)	17.0 (62.6)
Mean daily minimum °C (°F)	7.1 (44.8)	7.6 (45.7)	5.8 (42.4)	3.2 (37.8)	1.8 (35.2)	0.6 (33.1)	−0.1 (31.8)	0.2 (32.4)	1.3 (34.3)	3.5 (38.3)	4.4 (39.9)	6.1 (43.0)	3.5 (38.3)
Record low °C (°F)	−1.1 (30.0)	−1.7 (28.9)	−3.9 (25.0)	−6.7 (19.9)	−7.2 (19.0)	−10.0 (14.0)	−8.9 (16.0)	−7.2 (19.0)	−8.3 (17.1)	−3.9 (25.0)	−4.4 (24.1)	−1.7 (28.9)	−10.0 (14.0)
Average precipitation mm (inches)	75.5 (2.97)	74.7 (2.94)	66.4 (2.61)	86.3 (3.40)	109.7 (4.32)	157.0 (6.18)	164.8 (6.49)	185.9 (7.32)	156.5 (6.16)	111.1 (4.37)	111.3 (4.38)	97.3 (3.83)	1,396.3 (54.97)
Average precipitation days (≥ 1.0 mm)	6.9	5.6	7.1	8.5	10.9	13.2	16.6	16.3	13.2	10.5	10.0	8.2	127.0
Average afternoon relative humidity (%)	46	48	51	60	73	78	75	69	60	60	56	51	61
Source: Australian Bureau of Meteorology; Woods Point

== In popular culture ==
- Woods Point was the central location for the 1986 Australian action-adventure film Frog Dreaming (named The Go-Kids in the UK, The Quest in the US), starring Henry Thomas, Tony Barry, Rachel Friend and Tamsin West.
- Woods Point makes an appearance in the video game Forza Horizon 3 as a locality.

== See also ==
- Yarra Track
