= Tyers Valley tramway =

Former railway in Victoria, Australia

Coordinates: 37°58′52″S 146°20′34″E

The Tyers Valley tramway was a 2 ft 6 in (762 mm) narrow-gauge timber tramway built by the Forests Commission of Victoria to exploit timber resources on the slopes of Mount Baw Baw, Victoria. At Collins Siding the tramway linked with the Victorian Railways' narrow-gauge line from Moe to Walhalla, and was built to the same 2 ft 6 in (762 mm) gauge.

== Background ==
Sawmills in the forests of Victoria were usually connected to a railway by a privately owned tramway. Many of these tramways were constructed to very rudimentary standards, such as using timber rails and horses for motive power. The private tramways serving the Tyers Valley were largely destroyed by bushfires in 1926. Rather than rebuild the private tramways, the Forests Commission, the state-government body created to manage forest resources, decided to construct a higher-quality tramway to serve all private sawmills in the district.

== Technical specifications ==
The tramway used second-hand 40-pound-per-yard (19.8 kg/m) rails from Tasmania. It had a maximum grade of 1 in 30 (3.33%), and the curves a minimum radius of 80 ft (24.38 m). No ballast was used, but greater use was made of sleepers than was normal.

A geared locomotive was constructed by the Port Melbourne firm of Alfred Harmon in 1927. This locomotive, which had been purchased under requirements to support local industry, was too heavy and only ran once before being parked. Permission was given to import a Climax steam locomotive from the United States. The 25-ton class B locomotive was the last Climax locomotive ever manufactured, and the only one built for a 2 ft 6 in (762 mm) gauge railway.

== Route ==
The tramway route extended 6.1 miles (9.8 km) from Collins Siding to Tyers Junction, where the line divided to follow two of the three branches of the Tyers River. From Tyers Junction the western branch was a further 13.5 miles (21.7 km) to Growlers Creek, and the eastern branch was 8.75 miles (14.08 km) to 10 Acre Block.

== Operations ==
The original plan had been to use TACL rail tractors on the two branch lines from sawmills to Tyers Junction, with trains being combined there to be worked by the Harman locomotive to Collins Siding. When the Harman proved to be a failure the tractors had to be used for the whole length of the line, while the Climax was hastily ordered from the USA. The Climax was delivered to and assembled at Newport Workshops, then arrived at Moe on 5 October 1928 and ran under its own power from there through Collins Siding to Tyers Junction.

The Climax was an incredibly powerful and effective machine, but the axles broke often on the uneven track and this occasionally caused the engine to overturn. Occasionally, if the engine stayed upright, a diversion track would be built around the site of the failure and the tractors would resume operation of the full length of the line. Loading on the line was reduced from 77 long tons (78 t) to 61.5 long tons (62.5 t) and the locomotive's boiler pressure reduced to 160 psi (1,100 kPa) in the short term, and later the axles of the engine were strengthened to restore its capacity.

When the G class Garratt locomotives were introduced to the Walhalla and Crowes railway line in 1926, several of Victorian Railways NA class locomotives were deemed surplus to requirements. Engine 14A was tested on part of the Tyers Valley Tramway in 1933 and apparently worked well, but necessary bridge upgrades were never completed.

Over its life the Tramway moved 120,000,000 board feet (280,000 m^{3}) (Note: Board Feet is the same unit as Super-feet, a volume of 12 by 1 by 1 inch (305 mm × 25 mm × 25 mm), but Wikipedia does not support the latter unit.) of timber. In 1928-29 the six mills along the tramway generated 8,836,536 board feet (20,851.90 m^{3}) of timber; this dropped by more than half in the following year due to the economic depression, but by 1932-33 it was back up to comparable numbers. The 1939 bushfires resulted in another drop down to 4,249,129 board feet (10,026.83 m^{3}), and it declined further from there.

== Closure ==
The tramway closed on 5 August 1949, and the Climax locomotive was moved to the Government sawmill at Erica via Collins Siding in 1950. One of the TACLs was used to shunt Erica sawmill, behind the railway station and with a small fleet of around ten former NQ trucks, through the 1960s into the early 1970s even as the Walhalla line around it lay abandoned. Some of the wagons were still generally intact, while others had ends removed in facing pairs to cater for longer logs.

The other TACL and the Climax locomotive were both stored outside on a siding near the sawmill, while the Harman was left in the shed at Tyers Junction until it was sold for scrap in 1951.

Most of the tramway route has been opened as a rail trail. The Climax and one of the TACLs were subsequently preserved on the Puffing Billy Railway. The Climax had been purchased and transported to the Menzies Creek Museum in 1965, and was restored to operational condition in 1988. It is one of less than 20 Climax engines not scrapped, and as of 2011 it was one of only four that were operational.

== See also ==
- Bicycle Trails in Victoria

== Other reading ==
- The Tyers Valley Tramway, Wadeson, N.E. Australian Railway Historical Society Bulletin, January 1959 pp. 1–7
