= Victorian Railways rail tractor =

Class of Australian shunting locomotives

Victorian Railways Rail Tractor
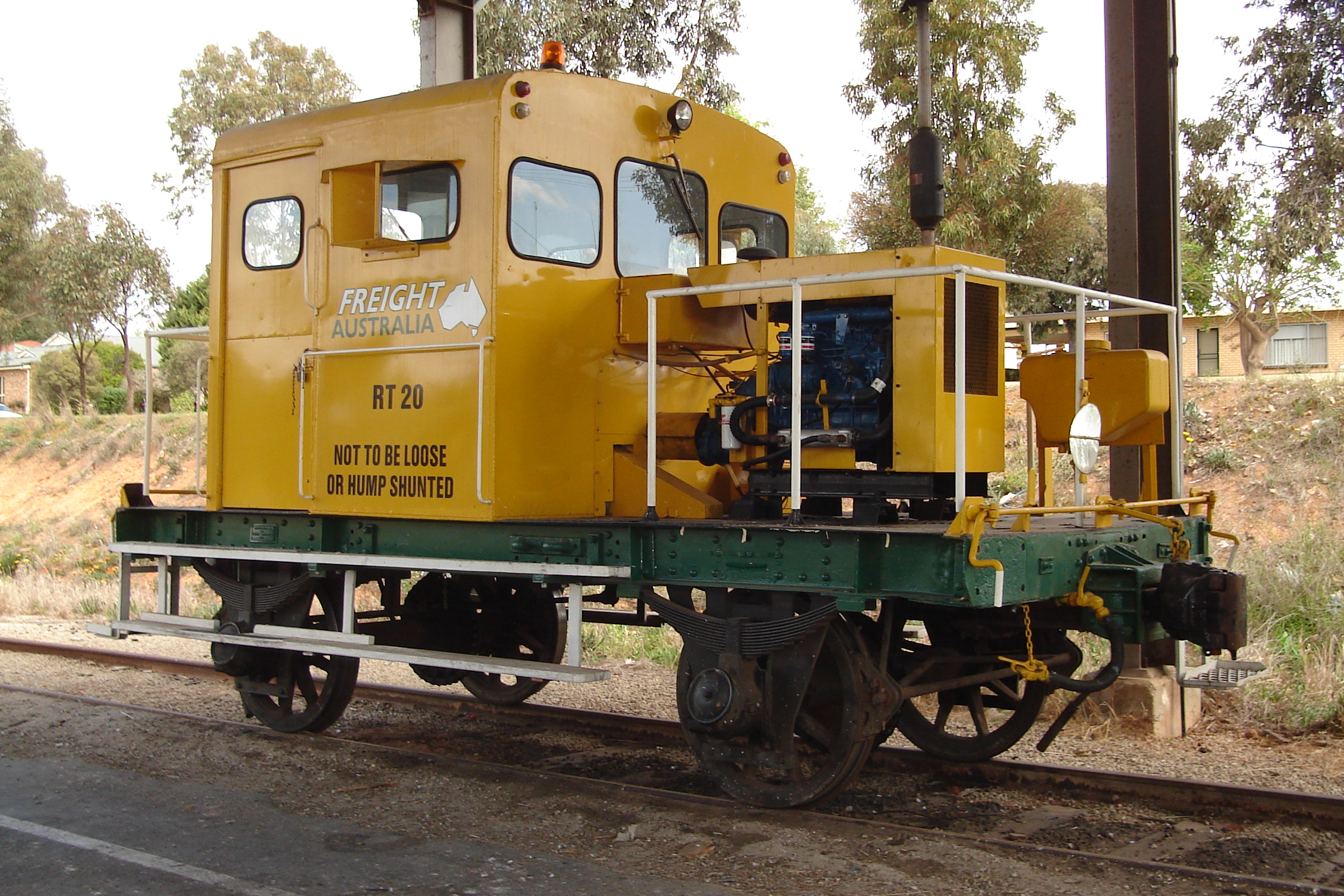
- RT 20 in Swan Hill, featuring the Freight Australia livery
Type and origin
- Power type: Diesel-mechanical
- Designer: Victorian Railways
- Builder: Newport Workshops, Ballarat North Workshops, Aresco
- Total produced: 54
Specifications
- Configuration
  - Whyte: 0-4-0DM
  - UIC: B
- Gauge: 5 ft 3 in (1,600 mm), some are 4 ft 8 1/2 in (1,435 mm)
- Wheel diameter: 3 ft 2.25 in (0.9716 m)
- Wheelbase: 10 ft 6 in (3.20 m)
- Length
  - Over couplers: 20 ft 10 in (6.35 m) (Nos' 2-8); 21 ft 5 in (6.53 m) (Nos' 9-32)
  - Over buffers: 20 ft 9.25 in (6.3310 m) (Nos' 2-8); 21 ft 4.5 in (6.515 m) (Nos' 9-32)
- Height: 11 ft 8 in (3.56 m)
- Loco weight: 9.75 t (9.60 long tons; 10.75 short tons) (No's 2-18); 10.25 t (10.09 long tons; 11.30 short tons) (No's 19-28); 10.2 t (10.0 long tons; 11.2 short tons) (No's 29-32)
- Fuel type: Diesel
- Fuel capacity: 15 imp gal (68 L)
- Water cap.: 3 imp gal (14 L) (Nos' 2-28); 4 imp gal (18 L) (Nos' 29-32)
- Sandbox cap.: Front and rear axles
- Prime mover: Fordson Diesel Major (No's 2-18); Fordson Prime Major (Nos' 19-32)
- RPM
  - Maximum RPM: 1600 (Nos' 2-28); 2000 (Nos' 29-32)
- Engine type: Diesel
- Cylinders: 4, wet sleeve
- Transmission: ML 1647/13 (No's 2-18); Wet plate clutch and 44817 transmission (Nos' 19-28); Wet plate clutch, 44817 transmission and Funk Reversomatic Hydraulic Transmission on front axle (No's 29-32)
- Loco brake: Dual hand brake and clutch operation (Nos' 2-18); Handbrake only, dual operation (Nos' 19-32)
- Couplers: Automatic coupler
Performance figures
- Maximum speed: 20 mph (32 km/h)
- Power output: 40.3 hp (30.1 kW) (Nos' 2-18); 51.8 hp (38.6 kW) (Nos' 19-28); 53.0 hp (39.5 kW) (Nos' 29-32)
- Tractive effort
  - Starting: 3,810 lbf (16.9 kN) (Nos' 2-18); 4,500 lbf (20 kN) (Nos' 19-28); 5,100 lbf (23 kN) (Nos' 29-32)
  - Continuous: At 5 mph (8.0 km/h); 2,710 lbf (12.1 kN) (Nos' 2-18); 3,200 lbf (14 kN) (Nos' 19-28); 2,600 lbf (12 kN) (Nos' 29-32)
Career
- Operators: Victorian Railways and successors
- Class: RT
- Numbers: 1-54, 201
- First run: 1932
- Current owner: Pacific National
- Disposition: 1 in service, 7 preserved, 2 stored, 45 scrapped

The Victorian Railways rail tractors are a fleet of small shunting units used by the Victorian Railways of Australia for moving railway wagons at country stations and in private sidings. Varying in power output and size, they generally consist of an agricultural tractor engine on top of a four-wheeled steel rail wagon frame, recycled from scrapped four-wheel goods wagons.

== History ==
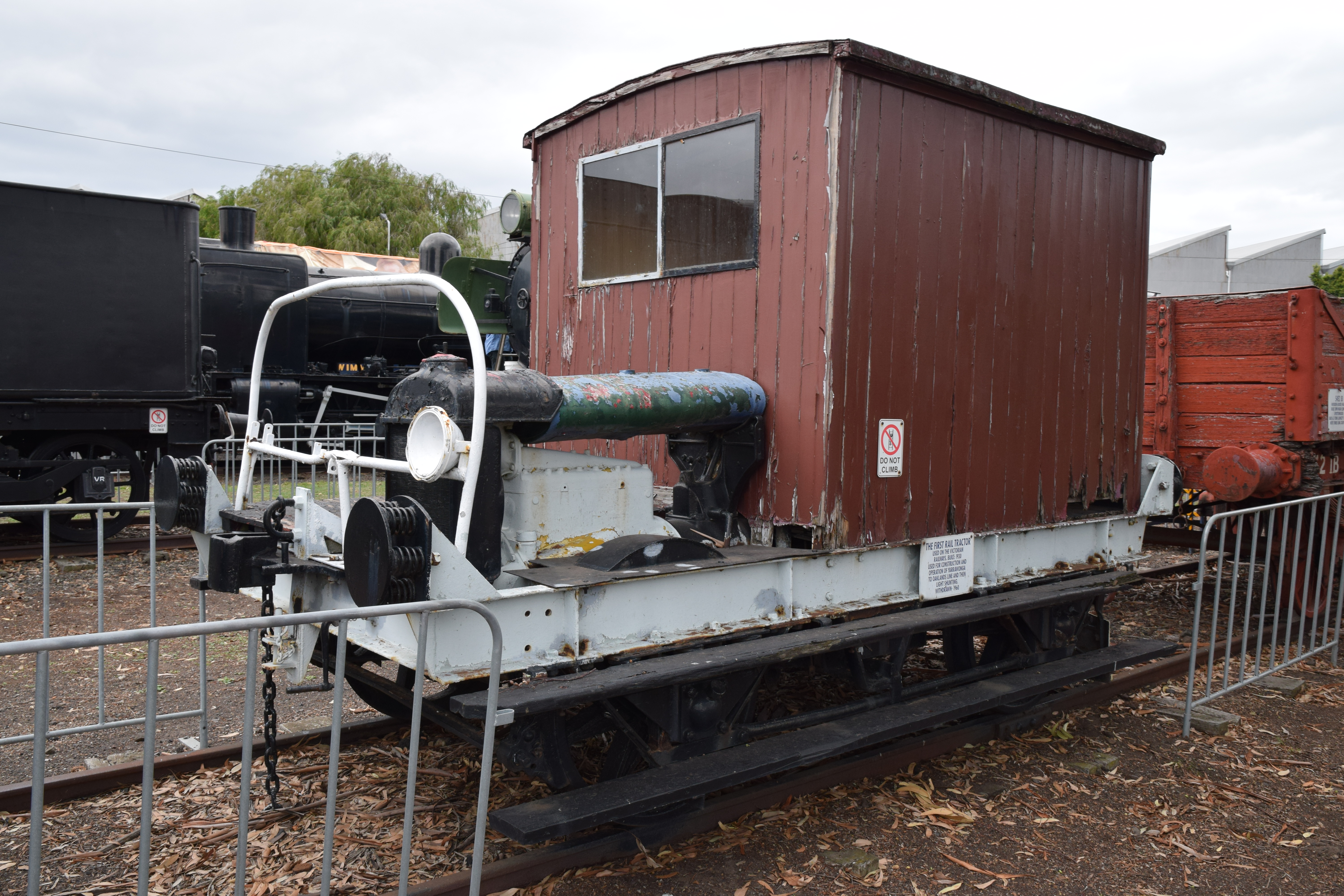
1RT preserved at the Newport Railway Museum

The first unit, RT1, entered service in 1932. RTs 2 through 8 were built at Newport Workshops and entered service in 1957, with a few more entering service each year through to RT39 in 1965. Six more were built at Ballarat North Workshops in 1967, another six in 1969, with a final two units built in 1975 and 1976. They operated all around the state, in any station yard that required mechanically assisted shunting but which did not justify a local locomotive. Previously, the work of that scale had been done with locally housed horses. The classleader was primarily used on new line construction.

Further rail tractors entered service in batches from 1957, as lower-powered steam engines and horses were withdrawn from regional and suburban stations around the state. Horses had been restricted to shunting only up to 50 long tons (51 t) at a time, a quarter of the capacity of the new tractors. The units were used within station yards, and operated by station staff not otherwise qualified as locomotive engine drivers. The low-powered units were only powerful enough to move eight to ten loaded four-wheel wagons on level ground (noting that not all station yards were perfectly flat), and while they were through-piped for air brakes when transferring around the state, the only braking facility the tractor units were given was a ratcheted lever in the cabin, connected mechanically to the underframe's pre-existing brake rigging.

The tractors were generally successful in service, replacing shunting engines and their associated crews at many stations around the state. For example, in October 1962 Colac lost its shunting locomotive (possibly D^{3} 646) and the crews were transferred to other depots. The last horse, a Clydesdale named "Prince", was retired from Ballarat in mid-1966, though he was replaced by a pneumatic-tyred shunting tractor rather than an RT. He was noted as having once hauled 40 long tons 7 cwt (90,400 lb or 41 t) in one movement, putting the capacity of the new rail tractors into perspective.

Fewer RTs were required over time as branch lines closed and block train working (without the need to shunt) was introduced, so many units were withdrawn. However, some were converted to standard gauge for use in Victoria and in New South Wales, and others are still in use as depot shunters.

On 31 January 1999 V/Line was sold to Freight Victoria, and the sale documentation recorded possession of units RT5, 6, 11, 14, 18–20, 25, 27–29, 31–32, 37–38, 42–43, 45-51 and 53 as in service; RT7, 10, 12, 16, 35, 40, 52 and "Aresco" (probably 54) as needing maintenance; RT3, 21, 24, 26, 30, 34 and 39 as sources of spare parts, and replacement engines intended for fitting to units 43, 47, 49, 51 and 52. Medlin (2004) lists RTs 5, 6, 14, 18–19, 27–28, 31–32, 35 37–38, 42, 45, 47–48, 51-52 and 54 as being transferred to Freight Victoria on 1 May 1999; as well as RT11 on 1 September (this may be a typo), and RT49 as to either Freight Victoria or Great Northern Rail Services. As of 2008, units authorised to operate on Victorian tracks were RT 3-40, 42-43 and 45–53, the second group being more powerful, and all are permitted to travel at 15 km/h maximum. Units RT 18, 28 and 43 were gauge converted and transferred to Sydney for use on the construction of the Epping to Chatswood railway.

=== Alternative RT1 ===
Some references indicate a second RT1^{A} entering service in 1938, having been transferred from the Public Works Department. Vincent notes that a second tractor was built to a similar design to RT1 for use inside Newport Workshops and this is corroborated by Divisional Diary. Vincent continues, noting that it was a failure in service and as of November 2007 its underframe was still in use as a parts platform in the Workshops compound. RT1 was reported as being scrapped on 12 October 1965, but given that RT1 is preserved at the Newport Railway Museum, Victoria, it is possible that the unit scrapped was RT1^{A}. Another possibility, given the description that it was "similar to the one preserved at the A.R.H.S. Museum", is that it was the former Stony Crossing/Murrabit tractor noted below.

The Divisional Diary, a precursor to Newsrail, recorded in 1965 that RT1 had originally entered service at Morwell and had been used elsewhere, before being reallocated to Newport Workshops in the later years where it was used to shunt Walker railmotors under repair; it was noted as retaining its original 40 hp (30 kW) Fordson engine to the end. RT1 was sighted at Moe yard on 18 March 1954, stabled in the narrow gauge ramp transfer siding between the buffers and a six-wheeled workmens sleeping car 50X, so the claim that it entered service at nearby Morwell is at least plausible, but the remainder of the text may have applied to the alternate RT1^{A}.

Notably, the plaque fitted to the preserved tractor unit at the Newport Railway museum states:

The first rail tractor used on the Victorian Railways. Built 1930

Used for construction and operation of Yarrawonga to Oaklands line and then light shunting.

Withdrawn 1960

== Operational details ==
The shunting units are not fitted with air brakes but are through-piped to enable them to be worked dead as part of a normal train. When they were transferred between stations and/or workshops the drive chains had to be removed and stored in the cabins, with the doors locked and signs provided indicating the lack of air brakes. The tractor was to be attached immediately behind the locomotive/s, and with a maximum trailing load of 2,400 tonnes. Additionally, the speed of the train is restricted to 65 km/h.

=== Design variations ===
The design of the RTs was constantly under review, with changes to the windows, brake systems, sanding arrangement and even the prime mover, with later units being more powerful. At least four distinct types were recorded in the Victorian Railways' planning documents, with groups 2–8, 9–18, 19-28 and 29-32 distinct enough to require different design documentation as of 1962. The second batch was identical to the first except with a slightly longer frame and different body shape, while the third and fourth had chain drive direct to both axles, a more powerful engine, and different transmission arrangements. Units up to 18RT were provided with kerosene lamps, 12 volt powered front and rear headlamps and windscreen wipers, sand boxes for all four wheels. From 19RT onwards the 12 volt supply also worked an air horn. Each tractor unit had capacity for 1.5 imp gal (6.8 L) engine oil, 4.5 imp gal (20 L) transmission oil in the front axleboxs and 9 imp gal (41 L) in the rear. RT19-28 also held 6 imp pt (3.4 L) of oil in the wet clutch, and RT29-32 had 4.75 imp gal (21.6 L) transmission oil in the front axle's Reversomatic unit rather than the previous arrangement.

The maximum rated haulage load for 2-28RT was 225 long tons (229 t) on the level, but engines 29-32 and probably later units were restricted to 200 long tons (200 t). The earlier units had six speed notches in both directions, while the higher-RPM units only had three:

Notch	RT2-28	RT29-32
1	3.57 mph (5.75 km/h)	6.5 mph (10.5 km/h)
2	5.04 mph (8.11 km/h)	10 mph (16 km/h)
3	6.38 mph (10.27 km/h)	24.5 mph (39.4 km/h)
4	9.05 mph (14.56 km/h)	
5	12.62 mph (20.31 km/h)	
6	22.6 mph (36.4 km/h)	

The maximum loads on various gradients were the same for all types, when shunting at 5 mph (8.0 km/h):

Grade	%	Load
1 in 50	2.00%	30 long tons (30 t)
1 in 75	1.33%	65 long tons (66 t)
1 in 100	1.00%	85 long tons (86 t)
1 in 150	0.67%	90 long tons (91 t)
1 in 200	0.50%	150 long tons (150 t)

As of mid-1986, RT units were limited to 30 km/h and the following loads:

		3-39RT	40, 42-53RT
Grade	%	Tonnes	Tonnes
Level	Level	190	210
1 in 40	2.50%	42	48
1 in 50	2.00%	51	58
1 in 75	1.33%	70	79
1 in 100	1.00%	83	95
1 in 150	0.67%	103	117
1 in 200	0.50%	117	132

By September 1961 all the Victorian Railways' tractors had been fitted with automatic couplers and new underframes. This may explain why records are not immediately available regarding which underframes were used for creation of the earlier tractors; a locomotive's identity generally resides with the frame, so a new frame makes a new (replica or replacement) locomotive.

=== Liveries ===
The first RT tractors were painted red or silver. After a number of level crossing "entanglements", the shunting tractors started to be repainted bright yellow. This started with RT14 at Kerang (having recently been repaired following ongoing clutch issues, then derailing again), and the RT allocated to Swan Hill. One unit is thought to have been painted white, and a number were repainted with yellow cabins but green underframes for use with Freight Australia.

In the period 1982–1983 they were stencilled with a number-code, exceptions being RT42, RT46 and RT51. When they were refurbished for V/Line, most tractors had the code letters placed first, except 20RT at Redcliffs in 1988, and 48RT at Maryborough in 1987. Of the refurbished units, 5, 11, 20, 29, 45, 47, 48 and 53 had orange underframes with white steps, while 7 and 21 had black underframes and steps.

In March 1989, it was reported that a refurbishment program for rail tractors was being undertaken at the Ballarat Railway Workshops and, as units went through the program, they were repainted into the then-current V/Line orange livery.

== Rail tractors associated with the Victorian Railways ==
=== V56 ===
Locomotive V56 was built for shunting at Jolimont Workshops. It entered service between RT18 and RT19, so its number 56 would have followed on from then-in-service steam locomotives C1 to C26 then X27 to X55, and its numbering being adjacent to the final RT54 is coincidental.

=== Aresco Track Chiefs ===
==== ATC1 and 2 ====
Two Aresco Track Chief units were built for use at the Long Island steel plants. Track Chief No.1 was seen at Crib Point and No.2 at Leongatha in 1995; both are now with the Mornington Railway Preservation Society.

==== RT46 ====
RT46 was built by Aresco Engineering in South Australia to the "Track Chief" model, and supplied to the Victorian Railways in 1966. Following testing at the Maribyrnong River goods sidings, it was used to assemble briquette trains at Morwell and occasionally to run construction trains to and from the Hazelwood power station then under construction, because the tractors already stationed there were often incapable of moving the heavy loads. It was later transferred to Spotswood and eventually repainted in V/Line orange (with black lettering instead of white on the logo), and by the 2000s it had been transferred to and repainted for use at the Deniliquin grain storage sidings; it is not clear whether it was sold to new operators, or if so, when.

==== RT54 (Portland Harbour Trust) ====
RT54 was built for the Portland Harbour Trust, which had used it in their private siding. It was briefly used at Jolimont Workshops in October 1976, possibly while V56 was unavailable. It was acquired by V/Line in 1994, around the time that the Portland line was converted to Standard Gauge, and sighted at Echuca in February 1996. As of 2008 specific instructions had been issued for its use in Echuca Yard. These included a maximum speed of 10 km/h while hauling wagons, 15 km/h while running on its own; a maximum trailing load of 450 tonnes without air brakes connected to the trailing vehicles. It has since been sold to Southern Shorthaul Railroad, reclassed to LT4, and is now in use as a workshops shunter at Bendigo North.

=== Portland Harbour Trust RTs ===
==== Portland 201 and classmate ====
Another four-wheel wagon was modified for and purchased by the Portland Harbour Trust in March 1959, becoming the Port of Portland's No.201. It entered service between RT13 and RT14, and was photographed working construction trains in the early 1960s, e.g. and . These photos show it in a dark livery with bright numbering so it was most likely in the Victorian Railways' default shunting red scheme with white letters.

Tractor 201 was initially used on construction (ballast and cement) trains on the main breakwater and the K. S. Anderson wharf. As of late 1960 it was working with a flat wagon cut down from a former Victorian Railways iron I type open wagon, and a side-discharging ballast hopper wagon built by the Portland Harbour Trust, described as "also basically a 1900 V.R. Newport wagon". The two wagons were fitted with side buffers and three-link couplings, so it is probable that the Tractor had locomotive-style dual link and automatic couplers.

In November 1960 a second rail tractor was supplied by the Victorian Railways, to the same design. By this time No.201 had been moved to the old "Ocean Pier" extending from Portland station yard, and the new Tractor was used for traffic to and from the Exchange Sidings between the Portland Harbour Trust railway and the Victorian Railways; these sidings consisted of four 1,470 ft (450 m)-long in clear sidings, and a weighbridge was provided at the northern end of the easternmost siding. In summer 1960-61 the second RT was noted shifting a 10,000 short tons (9,100 t) consignment of oats.

Both tractors were repainted to yellow at the Portland Harbour Trust's workshops by August 1961, and when not in use they were stabled on a new siding provided adjacent to the workshops, with the turnout facing Up trains. They were fitted with radio-telephone systems around early 1964.

Bray et al. 2014 uses photos from 1979 to illustrate No.201, as reproduced here alongside RT54 - , but the above-frame body style is significantly different from the default RT style. Later photos of the vehicle are available here - - roughly matching the 1979 cabin configuration but with alternate shunter step and handrail arrangements.

==== Portland 1 and 2 ====
A photo by John Dennis at Portland in 1971 shows two previously unaccounted-for rail tractors, apparently to the same design as the VR's RTs. It is not known whether these were Portland No.201 and its classmate, or completely separate units.

== Private and other rail tractors ==
=== Massey Ferguson ===
In November 1961, Malcolm Moore Industries provided a small shunting tractor for the Massey Ferguson plant in Sunshine, which had until then been using a former Victorian Railways F class steam locomotive. This unit uses a Massey Ferguson 65R engine, which develops 56.6 hp (42.2 kW) horsepower at 2000rpm. It is fitted with a four-speed hydrostatic transmission and a differential rear axle assembly, with a chain drive to both axles. It is now preserved at the Daylesford Spa Country Railway.

=== A.P.M. Maryvale and Broadford ===
Malcolm Moore Industries provided a small rail tractor to the Australian Paper#Australian Paper Manufacturers in 1939. This was originally used for construction and shunting at Maryvale on the APM's tramway, but later moved to Broadford. It is now with the Victorian Goldfields Railway.

=== Mulyarra ===
Hopper wagon O145, built in 1887, was scrapped in 1950 at Newport Workshops. The underframe was recycled by the Department of Munitions to construct a rail tractor for shunting at Maribyrnong and later Mulwala, north of Yarrawonga. It is not clear where the name Mulyarra came from or if it was ever applied to the unit. It was sold circa 1997. The vehicle was sighted at the West Coast Railway Ballarat East depot in 2000 and 2001, then at Tailem Bend in 2018. There may have been an earlier attempt to create a tractor using the frame from hopper O152 in 1948, but no records were available as of 2014.

=== Stony Crossing tractor ===
A rail tractor, described as "ancient" in 1965 and to the same design as 1RT already preserved at the Newport railway museum, had been based at Kerang and used on trains to Stony Crossing, typically working short trains composed of a handful of trucks and a YZ combined second class passenger and brake van, unless traffic was significant enough to justify a locomotive-hauled service. The line and service was cut back to the Victorian and New South Wales border in 1943 and ceased operation in April 1961.

=== Narrow Gauge ===
==== NRT1 ====
NRT1
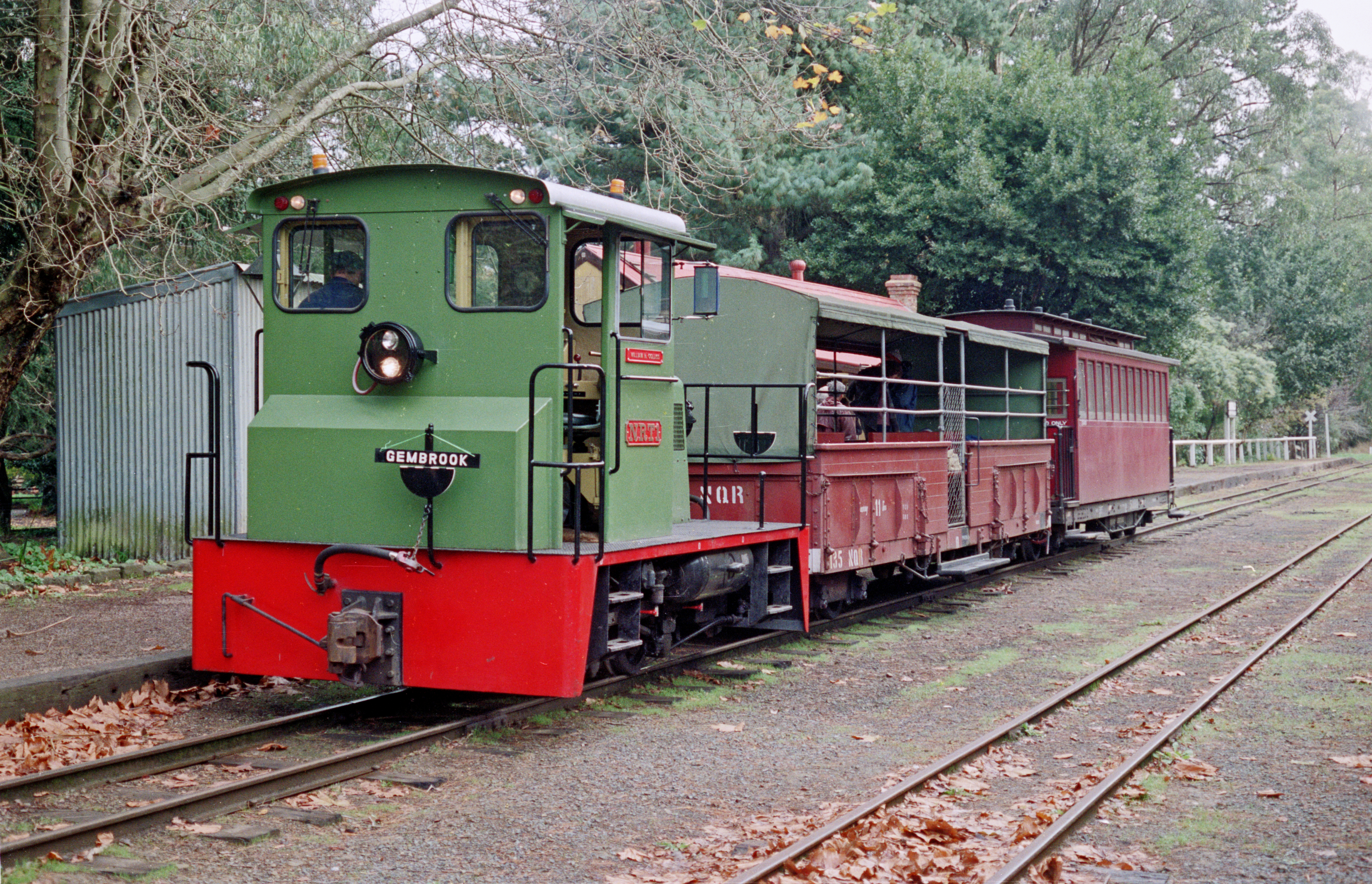
- NRT1 on a special train at Emerald, 30 May 1987
Type and origin
- Power type: Diesel-mechanical
- Builder: Ruston & Hornsby, Lincoln, England
- Model: 48DL
- Build date: 1950
Specifications
- Configuration
  - Whyte: 0-4-0DM
- Gauge: 3 ft (914 mm), later 2 ft 6 in (762 mm)
- Wheel diameter: 18 in (0.46 m)
- Length: 15 ft 6 in (4.72 m)
- Height: 10 ft (3.0 m)
- Axle load: 4.75 short tons (4.31 t)
- Loco weight: 9.15 short tons (8.30 t)
- Engine type: Diesel
Career
- Operators: Victorian Railways
- Class: NRT
- Numbers: 1
- First run: 1951
- Current owner: Puffing Billy Railway

A small diesel shunting unit was built by Ruston & Hornsby in 1950, to a rail gauge of three feet, for use by the Victorian State Electricity Commission at the Kiewa Power Station. After that project was completed the unit was sold to the Melbourne & Metropolitan Board of Works, regauged to 2 ft 6in, and continued in use until 1977 when it was purchased by the Emerald Tourist Railway Board and Puffing Billy Railway. It was initially stored in the Menzies Creek museum, then transferred in 1978 to the Emerald Carriage Workshops. In 1983 it was painted green and returned to service as NRT1, following the Victorian Railways' system of classifying narrow gauge stock with an 'N' prefix and a new number sequence.

The unit features a clutch-less 3 speed gearbox, meaning the driver could control them whilst walking alongside to make shunting easier. Adjustable tie rods meant that as the axles moved on the springs they followed the radius of the drive chains, reducing the chances of chain snatch.

Older references indicate that Puffing Billy Railway intended to repaint the engine to represent earlier Victorian Railways shunting units' red livery, but in early 2015 the engine was repainted to the same green and red scheme.

==== TACL ====
TACL
Type and origin
- Power type: Diesel-mechanical
- Builder: Malcolm Moore, Port Melbourne
Specifications
- Configuration
  - Whyte: 0-4-0DM
- Gauge: 2 ft 6 in (762 mm)
- Wheelbase: 5 ft (1.5 m)
- Engine type: Diesel
Performance figures
- Power output: 20 hp (15 kW)
- Tractive effort: 2,000 lbf (8.9 kN)
Career
- Operators: Tyers Valley Tramway
- First run: 1928
- Current owner: Puffing Billy Railway

The first TACL is an 0-4-0DM built by Malcolm Moore of Port Melbourne in January 1928, using a Tractor Appliance Company Limited engine, for the Tyers Valley Tramway.

The tramway was built by the Forests Commission of Victoria in response to forest fires in 1926. It connected to the Victorian Railways' Moe-Walhalla line at Collins Siding; the tractor was used to haul timber extracted from the local area to the railway, where it was transhipped to railway wagons.

The original plan was for the tractor to haul timber to Tyers Junction, with steam haulage from there to Collins Siding, but the steam locomotive proved unreliable. This eventually resulted in the Tramway ordering their Climax locomotive, and a second TACL was purchased in May 1928. From late May, the smaller tractor units were used on the branch lines and for ballast trains, while a larger Harman locomotive ran trips between Tyers Junction and Collins Siding in sets of eight trucks.

The TACL was used until 1949 then abandoned at Erica until purchased by the W&T.R.S.T. in 1971. It was never used at Walhalla, but in 1974 it was purchased by the Puffing Billy Preservation Society and moved to Emerald for storage. Restoration commenced in 1987 and was completed in 2000.

== Fleet details ==
ID	Entered service	Frame	Withdrawn	Scrapped	September 1981	March 1982	January 1989	31 January 1999	Last known location	Notes
RT1	11 June 1932	(Unlisted)	1968	(Unlisted)	(Unlisted)	(Unlisted)	(Unlisted)	Museum	Newport Railway Museum (2020)	Preserved, Wooden Bodied, Red Livery
RT1^{A}	August 1938	(Unlisted)	(Unlisted)	12 October 1965	(Unlisted)	(Unlisted)	(Unlisted)	(Unlisted)	(Unlisted)	Scrapped, Wooden Bodied, Red livery
RT2	24 January 1957	(Unlisted)	1980s	(Unlisted)	(Unlisted)	(Unlisted)	(Unlisted)	Huon	Creek Sidings North Melbourne (2007)	Scrapped, yellow livery
RT3	15 February 1957	(Unlisted)	(Unlisted)	(Unlisted)	Rochester	Rochester	Rochester	Bendigo Loco, spare parts	Daylesford (2024)	Preserved, yellow livery
RT4	29 August 1957	(Unlisted)	(Unlisted)	(Unlisted)	Warracknabeal	Wodonga	Seymour Loco	(Unlisted)	(Unlisted)	Scrapped, yellow livery
RT5	6 September 1957	(Unlisted)	(Unlisted)	(Unlisted)	Spotswood	Spotswood	Wangaratta	Tocumwal, for Kelly's	North Bendigo (2012)	Scrapped, yellow livery
RT6	18 September 1957	(Unlisted)	(Unlisted)	(Unlisted)	Rochester	Rochester	Ballarat, Bairnsdale	Morwell	North Bendigo (2012)	Scrapped, yellow livery
RT7	1 October 1957	(Unlisted)	(Unlisted)	(Unlisted)	Euroa	Oaklands	Donald	Bendigo, pending maintenance	Bendigo (2006)	Scrapped, yellow livery
RT8	16 October 1957	(Unlisted)	1990	(Unlisted)	Ouyen	Recliffs	Ballarat Workshops	(Unlisted)	(Unlisted)	Scrapped, yellow livery
RT9	12 September 1958	(Unlisted)	(Unlisted)	1990	Kyabram	Kyabram	Seymour Loco	(Unlisted)	(Unlisted)	Scrapped, yellow livery
RT10	18 September 1958	(Unlisted)	(Unlisted)	(Unlisted)	Woodend	Woodend	Colac, Geelong North Yard	Bendigo Loco, pending maintenance	Bendigo (2006)	Scrapped, yellow livery
RT11	29 September 1958	(Unlisted)	(Unlisted)	(Unlisted)	Horsham	Ararat	Bridgewater	Bridgewater	Allied Mills Ballarat (2014)	Scrapped, yellow livery
RT12	10 October 1958	(Unlisted)	(Unlisted)	(Unlisted)	Oakleigh	Oakleigh	Seymour Loco	Bendigo Loco, pending maintenance	(Unlisted)	Scrapped, yellow livery
RT13	28 October 1958	(Unlisted)	(Unlisted)	(Unlisted)	Numurkah	Numurkah	Ballarat Workshops	(Unlisted)	(Unlisted)	Scrapped, yellow livery
RT14	9 June 1959	(Unlisted)	(Unlisted)	(Unlisted)	Tottenham	Colac	Bendigo Loco	Swan Hill	Swan Hill (2025)	Scrapped, yellow livery
RT15	22 June 1959	(Unlisted)	(Unlisted)	(Unlisted)	Bendigo	Horsham	Euroa	(Unlisted)	To Trentham Agricultural & Railway Museum circa 1994	Preserved, yellow livery
RT16	3 July 1959	(Unlisted)	(Unlisted)	(Unlisted)	Bendigo	Bridgewater	Warrnambool	Bendigo Loco, pending maintenance	Bendigo (2006)	Scrapped, yellow livery
RT17	16 July 1959	(Unlisted)	(Unlisted)	(Unlisted)	Sea Lake	Sea Lake	Castlemaine	(Unlisted)	Healesville (2010)	Preserved, yellow livery
RT18	11 September 1959	(Unlisted)	(Unlisted)	(Unlisted)	Hamilton	Hamilton	Dimboola	Dimboola (standard gauge)	Lithgow - NSW (2018)	Scrapped, yellow livery
RT19	5 August 1960	(Unlisted)	(Unlisted)	(Unlisted)	Footscray	Footscray	Kerang	Kerang	Swan Hill (2018)	Scrapped, yellow livery
RT20	25 August 1960	(Unlisted)	(Unlisted)	(Unlisted)	Redcliffs	Irymple	Irymple	Ballarat, leased to Bunge	Swan Hill (2018)	Scrapped, yellow livery
RT21	9 September 1960	(Unlisted)	(Unlisted)	(Unlisted)	Ouyen	Ballarat	Horsham	Bendigo Loco, spare parts	Bendigo (2006)	Scrapped, yellow livery
RT22	22 May 1961	(Unlisted)	(Unlisted)	(Unlisted)	Kerang	Kerang	Ballarat Workshops	(Unlisted)	(Unlisted)	Scrapped, yellow livery
RT23	9 June 1961	(Unlisted)	(Unlisted)	(Unlisted)	Melbourne Yard	Seymour	Ballarat Workshops	(Unlisted)	(Unlisted)	Scrapped, yellow livery
RT24	23 June 1961	(Unlisted)	(Unlisted)	(Unlisted)	Traralgon	Traralgon	Leongatha	Shaw's, pending delivery to Bendigo for repairs	Murray Bridge (2015)	Scrapped, yellow livery
RT25	10 July 1961	(Unlisted)	(Unlisted)	(Unlisted)	Nhill	Nhill	Red Cliffs	Albion, leased to Independent Mills	Albion, Eclipse Flour Mill (2015)	Scrapped, yellow livery
RT26	26 July 1961	(Unlisted)	(Unlisted)	(Unlisted)	Ballarat	Ouyen	Geelong Loco	Bendigo Loco, spare parts	(Unlisted)	Scrapped, yellow livery
RT27	7 August 1961	(Unlisted)	(Unlisted)	(Unlisted)	Ararat	Seymour, Yarrawonga	Traralgon	Donald	North Bendigo (2014)	Scrapped, yellow livery
RT28	24 August 1961	(Unlisted)	(Unlisted)	(Unlisted)	Seymour	Seymour	Kyabram	Horhsam (standard gauge)	Port Waratah (2018)	Scrapped, yellow livery
RT29	18 January 1962	(Unlisted)	(Unlisted)	(Unlisted)	Traralgon	Traralgon	Ballarat Loco	Dennington, leased to Nestlé	Donald (2019)	Returned to service by 30 June 2026 for use within the Peaco Foods' siding at Donald, for shunting only at maximum speed of 10 km/h (6.2 mph). Yellow livery
RT30	3 October 1962	(Unlisted)	(Unlisted)	(Unlisted)	Colac	Tocumwal	North Melbourne wagon workshops	Bendigo Loco, spare parts	(Unlisted)	Scrapped, yellow livery
RT31	24 October 1962	IA7614	(Unlisted)	(Unlisted)	Moe	Moe	Morwell Briquette Siding	Congupna, leased to Pivot	Castlemaine (2024)	Preserved, yellow livery
RT32	19 November 1962	IA7241	(Unlisted)	(Unlisted)	Swan Hill	Swan Hill	Bendigo Loco	North Dynon, leased to S.C.T. (standard gauge)	Laverton (2019)	Stored, mounted outside SCT Laverton, SCT livery
RT33	28 March 1963	(Unlisted)	(Unlisted)	(Unlisted)	Korong Vale	Korong Vale	Ballarat Workshops	(Unlisted)	(Unlisted)	Scrapped, yellow livery
RT34	7 May 1963	(Unlisted)	(Unlisted)	(Unlisted)	Camperdown	Warracknabeal	Warracknabeal	Bendigo Loco, spare parts	(Unlisted)	Scrapped, yellow livery
RT35	24 April 1963	IA7046	(Unlisted)	(Unlisted)	Orbost	Orbost	Traralgon	Bendigo Loco, requires engine	North Bendigo (2012)	Scrapped, yellow livery
RT36	1 July 1964	IA2385	(Unlisted)	(Unlisted)	Traralgon	Cowwarr	Bairnsdale	(Unlisted)	(Unlisted)	Scrapped, yellow livery
RT37	28 July 1964	IA7603	(Unlisted)	2025	Charlton	Charlton	Boort	Bendigo Loco, reserved spare for Northern Region	North Bendigo (2025)	Scrapped, yellow livery
RT38	15 August 1964	IA7363	(Unlisted)	(Unlisted)	Leongatha	Leongatha	Sunshine	Morwell, reserved spare for Eastern Region	North Bendigo (2012)	Scrapped, yellow livery
RT39	4 June 1965	IA7401	(Unlisted)	(Unlisted)	Nowa Nowa	Nowa Nowa	Morwell	Shaw's, pending delivery to Bendigo for repairs	Dynon (2018)	Scrapped, yellow livery
RT40	26 June 1967	IA7539	(Unlisted)	(Unlisted)	Westall	Westall	Seymour Loco	Tottenham Yard, pending maintenance	(Unlisted)	Scrapped, yellow livery
RT41	14 July 1967	IA7565	(Unlisted)	(Unlisted)	(Unlisted)	(Unlisted)	(Unlisted)	(Unlisted)	To Shire of Morwell then South Gippsland Tourist Railway; to Moorooduc by 2010.	Preserved, yellow livery
RT42	15 February 1967	IA7576	(Unlisted)	(Unlisted)	Seymour	Seymour	Bendigo Loco	Boort, leased to HiCube	North Bendigo (2012)	Scrapped, yellow livery
RT43	29 August 1967	IA7622	(Unlisted)	(Unlisted)	Echuca	Echuca	Swan Hill, Bendigo Loco	Kensington, leased to Goodman Fielders	Port Kembla - NSW (2018)	Scrapped, yellow livery
RT44	14 September 1967	IA7001	(Unlisted)	1987	Traralgon	Morwell	"Wrecked"	(Unlisted)	(Unlisted)	Scrapped, yellow livery
RT45	3 October 1967	IA7331	(Unlisted)	(Unlisted)	Morwell	Traralgon	Benalla	Wodonga, leased to Pivot	North Bendigo (2012)	Scrapped, yellow livery
RT46	1 September 1966	Aresco Track Chief	(Unlisted)	(Unlisted)	Spotswood	Spotswood	Spotswood	Spotswood Anzac siding	Spotswood (2024)	To VicTrack circa 2000; stored, yellow livery
RT47	25 July 1969	IA7214	(Unlisted)	(Unlisted)	Deniliquin	Deniliquin	Ballarat Workshops	Benalla	Echuca (2023)	Scrapped, yellow livery
RT48	7 August 1969	IA7228	(Unlisted)	(Unlisted)	Morwell	Portland	Maryborough	Warragul, leased to log contractor	Port Kembla - NSW (2018)	Scrapped, yellow livery
RT49	20 August 1969	K85	(Unlisted)	(Unlisted)	Portland	Morwell	Maffra	Flinders Street, leased to Colemans FSS	North Bendigo (2012)	Scrapped, yellow livery
RT50	3 September 1969	IA7457	(Unlisted)	2025	Stawell	Stawell	Deniliquin	Echuca, reserved spare for Northern Region	North Bendigo (2025)	Scrapped, yellow livery
RT51	19 September 1969	IA6998	(Unlisted)	(Unlisted)	Tocumwal	Camperdown	Traralgon	Morwell Briquette Siding	Bendigo (2006)	Scrapped, yellow livery
RT52	6 November 1969	IA7506	(Unlisted)	(Unlisted)	Castlemaine	Castlemaine	Echuca	Echuca, pending maintenance	Port Kembla - NSW (2018)	Scrapped, yellow livery
RT53	27 October 1975	(Unlisted)	(Unlisted)	(Unlisted)	Redan	Ballarat	Ballarat Loco	North Bendigo Workshops, leased to Goninans	Healesville (2025)	Preserved, yellow livery
RT54	6 October 1976	Aresco Track Chief	(Unlisted)	2025	(Unlisted)	(Unlisted)	(Unlisted)	Echuca, defective	North Bendigo (2025)	To V/Line September 1994. Scrapped, yellow livery
201	27 February 1959	KR125	(Unlisted)	2025	(Unlisted)	(Unlisted)	(Unlisted)	(Unlisted)	(Unlisted)	Scrapped
2^{nd} P.H.T.	November 1960	(Unlisted)	(Unlisted)	(Unlisted)	(Unlisted)	(Unlisted)	(Unlisted)	(Unlisted)	(Unlisted)	(Unlisted)

== See also ==
- New South Wales X100 class
- New South Wales X200 class
