= British Australian Tramway, Woolgoolga =

Coordinates: 30.111785°S 153.193402°E

British Australian Tramway
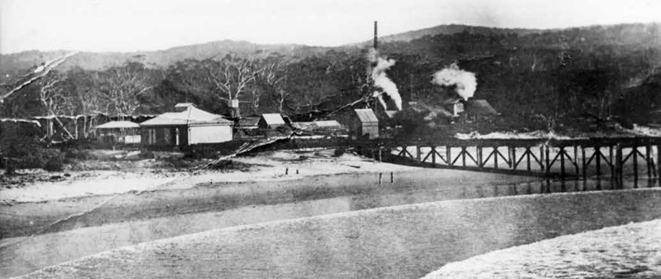
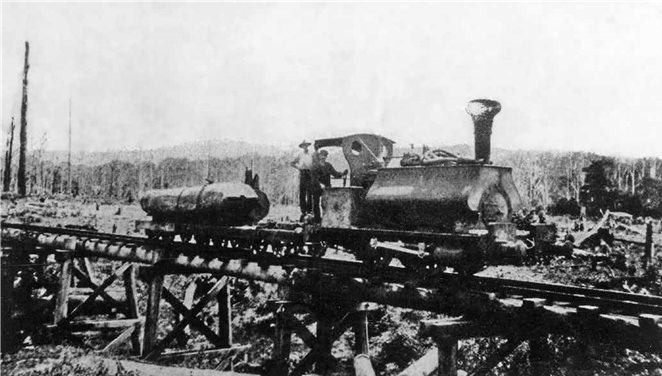
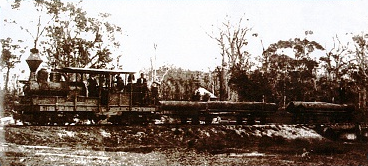
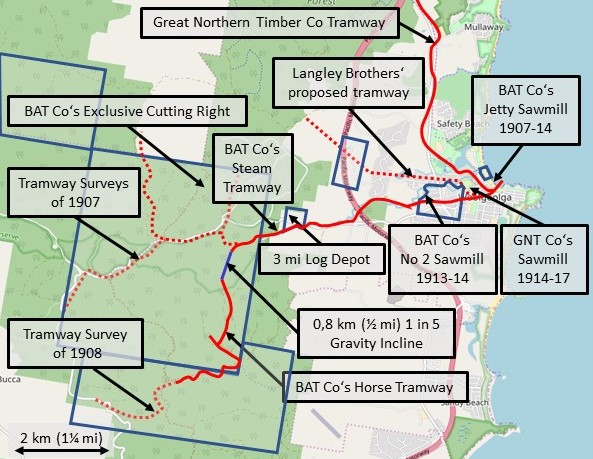
- BATCo’s Jetty Sawmill at the jetty in Woolgoolga Murray and Paterson 0-4-0ST locomotive (205/1886) crossing Woolgoolga Creek between jetty and incline Tramway alongside Creek Road in Woolgoolga Route of tramway superimposed onto a modern map

Technical
- Line length: 7 miles (11.27 km)
- Track gauge: 3 ft 6 in (1,067 mm)

The British Australian Tramway was a 9 kilometres (5.6 mi) long logging railway with a gauge of 3 ft 6 in (1,067 mm) in Woolgoolga in the Australian state New South Wales, which operated from 1907 to 1914.

== Set-up and construction ==
The British Australian Timber Company (B.A.T. Co.) was founded in 1906 as a subsidiary of Dalgety Holdings. It purchased in October 1906 a sawmill in Woolgoolga, which had been set-up in 1903 by George W. Nichols. The deal included machinery and equipment, as well as 2.2 hectares (5.5 acres) of land in Woolgoolga and three log harvesting contracts of 3,500 pounds plus two more sawmills in Woolgoolga and south of it.

The other tramway in Woolgoolga was operated from 1912 by the Great Northern Timber (G.N.T. Co.) on its 3 ft 6 in (1067 mm) track from the jetty to Corindi.

The ship Dorrigo delivered rails and machines for the sawmill to Woolgoolga in 1906 with a total weight of 200 t. Building a tramway was required, because the unsealed roads became to muddy by the bullock teams and traction engines. Its construction commenced mid 1907.

== Route ==
The tramway of B.A.T. Co. ran from the government-owned jetty of Woolgoolga to the forest in the lower Bucca of the Jesse Simpson Range. By August 1907 it reached the 3 mile depot. Subsequently the ship Nymboida delivered more steel rails with a weight of 30 t to Woolgoolga. By end of January 1908, the tram had reached its planned end of track near a waterfall, where an incline was subsequently built.

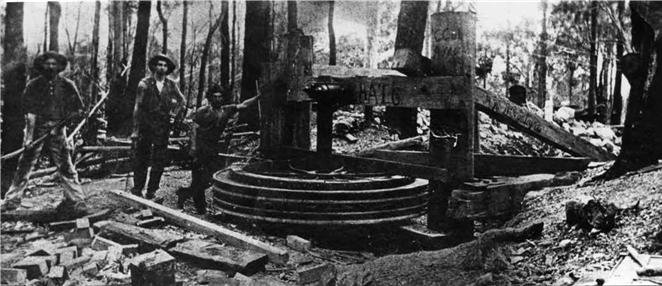
A horizontal bull wheel was installed at the upper end of the gravity-operated incline

A horizontal bull wheel was installed in 1908 at the upper end of the gravity operated incline with a grade of 1 in 5 (i.e. 2 %). When loaded log cars ran down the incline they pulled up empty ones uphill by a steel rope with. By end of March 1909 the tramway had been extended to 8 km (5 miles). By end of April of the same year it was 10,5 km (6⅓ miles) long. Above the incline and on the jetty it was hauled by horses.

== Operation ==
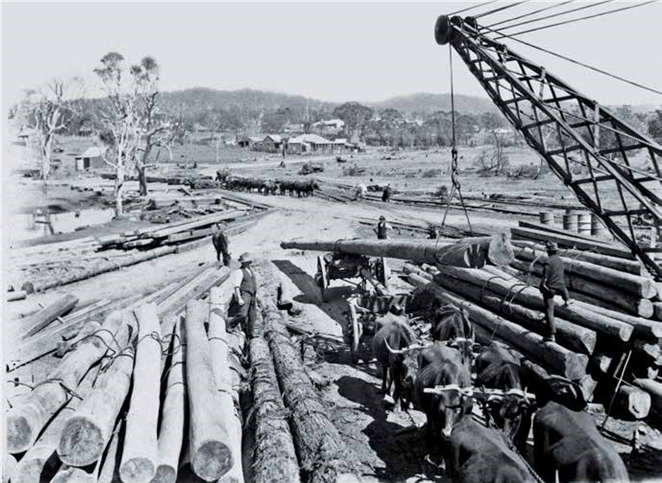
Bullock teams with logs and railway sleepers at Woolgoolga jetty crane, 1929

Up to 16 logs could be transported per train. Up to two return runs were conducted per day, if required. The sawmills could cut the logs faster than the sawn timber could be loaded onto ships. Thus connecting the tramways in Coffs Harbour and Woolgoolga was considered during busy times, but the plans have not been implemented. By 1913 six ships were loaded per week. Wet weather and the outbreak of World War I put the B.A.T. Co. into financial difficulties, because the orders from Germany, Japan, South Africa and the United Kingdom could not be placed with them anymore. The operation ceased in 1914 and most assets were sold in November and December 1916.

== Locomotive ==
B.A.T. Co. purchased a used 12 t steam locomotive, which Lewis Thomas had previously used on his 3 km (2 mi) longe industrial railway from Aberdare Colliery in Blackstone to the station of the government railways in Bundamba near Ipswich in Queensland. It had been built in 1886 with works number 205 by Murray & Paterson in Coatbridge, Scotland. Its saddletank was inversely curved as in contemporary Andrew Barclay locomotives but differently to most other saddle tank locomotives. It arrived on 13 July 1907 in an operable condition at Woolgoolga Jetty.

According to other sources, the locomotive has been purchased in 1908, and was finally transferred to the Boambee Tramway.

Manufacturer	Works No	Year	Photo	Type	Cylinders
Murray & Paterson	205	1886		0-4-0ST	9 inch

== Decline and closure ==
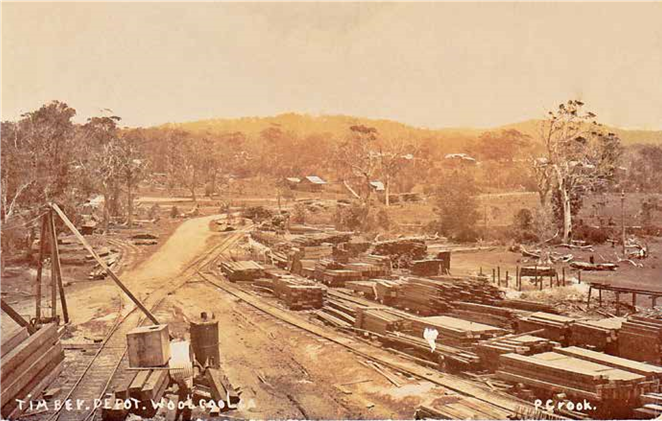
Woolgoolga Jetty after World War I with sawn timber of the sawmills in Bark Hut and Coramba, remnants of B.A.T.Co.’s tramway and on the left a siding to ED Pike’s town sawmill

The operation ceased in September 1914, and in November and December 1916 the assets were sold after the sister company in Coffs Harbour had burned-down.

== Preserved relics ==
A loaded rail car is exhibited at 73 Turon Parade, Woolgoolga in front of Woolgoolga Art Gallery on a 3 long piece of railway track. Plates 7 and 8 of the Woolgoolga Heritage Walk describe the tramway. A 65 t log of a blue gum tree was exhibited from 1990 to at least 2014 at the former Clouton & Blacker Mill in 1670 Solitary Islands Way, Woolgoolga.

== Cultural heritage ==
The tramway is not listed in the heritage register or on the heritage schedule of the Coffs Harbour local environmental plan of Coffs Harbour, although it represents the social and economic history of the region.

== Additional literature ==
- The Tramways of Woolgoolga, The British Australian Timber Company. Australian Railway History Society, ARHS Bn No. 94, August 1945.
- N. Yeates: Woolgoolga - The History of a Village, North Coast, N.S.W. Advocate-Opinion Press, Coffs Harbour, 1982.
- J. Longworth The Jetty and Sawmill Tramways of Woolgoolga. Australian Railway History Society, ARHS Bn No. 832, Februar 2007.

== See also ==
- British Australian Tramway, Coffs Harbour
