= Australian Paper =

Australian paper manufacturer

- Type: Private
- Industry: Manufacturing
- Founded: 1895
- Headquarters: Melbourne, Australia
- Products: Reflex copy paper, Tudor envelopes, Tudor and Olympic stationery products, Postspeed, Saxton, Australian Copy Paper
- Number of employees: Approximately 1,300
- Website: http://www.australianpaper.com.au/

Australian Paper (now known as Opal) is an Australian manufacturer of office, printing and packaging papers.

The company manufactures more than 600,000 tonnes of paper annually for Australia, New Zealand and other export markets. Australian Paper was purchased from Paperlinx by Nippon Paper Industries in June 2009. In 2020 Nippon Paper Industries announced it had acquired Orora Fibre's businesses and had combined them to form a new company, Opal.

== Facilities ==
Australian Paper has two manufacturing facilities: the Maryvale Mill in the Latrobe Valley and a manufacturing facility in Preston. In February 2015 Australian Paper announced the closure of the Shoalhaven Paper Mill in Bomaderry, New South Wales. The mill closed in July 2015. In April 2015, Australian Paper opened a new A$90 million paper recycling plant at the Maryvale Mill. The plant can process up to 80,000 tonnes of wastepaper a year.

=== Maryvale tramway ===
Maryvale Paper Train
Overview
- Service type: Freight train
- First service: 12 March 1996
- Current operators: V/Line Freight; Freight Victoria; Freight Australia; Pacific National; Qube

Route
- Termini: APM in Maryvale; Dynon Freight Terminal
- Train number: 9471/9472

Technical
- Track gauge: 1,600 mm (5 ft 3 in)
- Operating speed: 80 km/h

To serve the paper mill in Maryvale, an extended siding was built diverging north from the Gippsland railway line between Morwell railway station and Traralgon railway station. A set of sidings were established at a place referred to as Maryvale, at about 148.3 km (92.1 mi) from Melbourne.

==== Operations ====
The line was built with the mill during 1939-1940, with APM-operated shuttle trips between the Mill and the Exchange sidings, from which the Victorian Railways would convey wagons for the rest of their trip. This system remained in place for over fifty years, over which time the traffic load from the Mill site increased, while at the same time the Victorian Railways, later VicRail and V/Line, were winding up the local freight business and converting to a block train model with dedicated, high intensity service to specific locations rather than having to shunt at every siding between a pair of terminals.

After several years of negotiations, V/Line Freight won a contract for the transport of large quantities of containerised paper products from Maryvale, in the Gippsland region, for both Victorian and interstate customers. Trains would be split in the city, with one portion unloaded at Footscray Road and the other at the Dynon terminal; the latter loading was then transferred to National Rail freight trains running to Sydney or Adelaide, as required. The first service ran on 12 March 1996, using VQDW "Jumbo" container flat wagons, each of which could be loaded with two 40 ft containers. The initial contract was worth about $1.6 million per year for five years, with 160,000 tonnes of goods expected to run in the first year (about 800 tonnes per train), of which about two-thirds was domestic and the balance interstate.

In 1999, the contract transferred to Freight Victoria (later Freight Australia), which were purchased by Pacific National in 2004. In 2013, the contract was handed over to Qube, partially because Pacific National was withdrawing most of its Victorian operations. At the time, Australian Paper was transporting less than 300,000 tonnes of freight per year by rail, with the balance by road. To cater for an additional proposed 100,000 tonnes per year of loading, Qube invested in a fleet of 80 ft skeletal flat wagons, some of which were deployed on the Maryvale run.

As of 2019, the most common operation used two of the four locomotives VL353, VL356 & VL360, G512 and G515, hauling the equivalent of around thirty 40 feet (12 m) containers on about twenty Jumbo-length wagons.

==== Plant boiler locomotives ====
During construction the mill was served by a set of five redundant Victorian Railways locomotives lined up beside the paper manufacturing equipment, with their steam generation capacity being used to work the equipment and a common smoke flue connected for exhaust. These remained in service until the new plant boiler was commissioned.

==== Locomotives ====
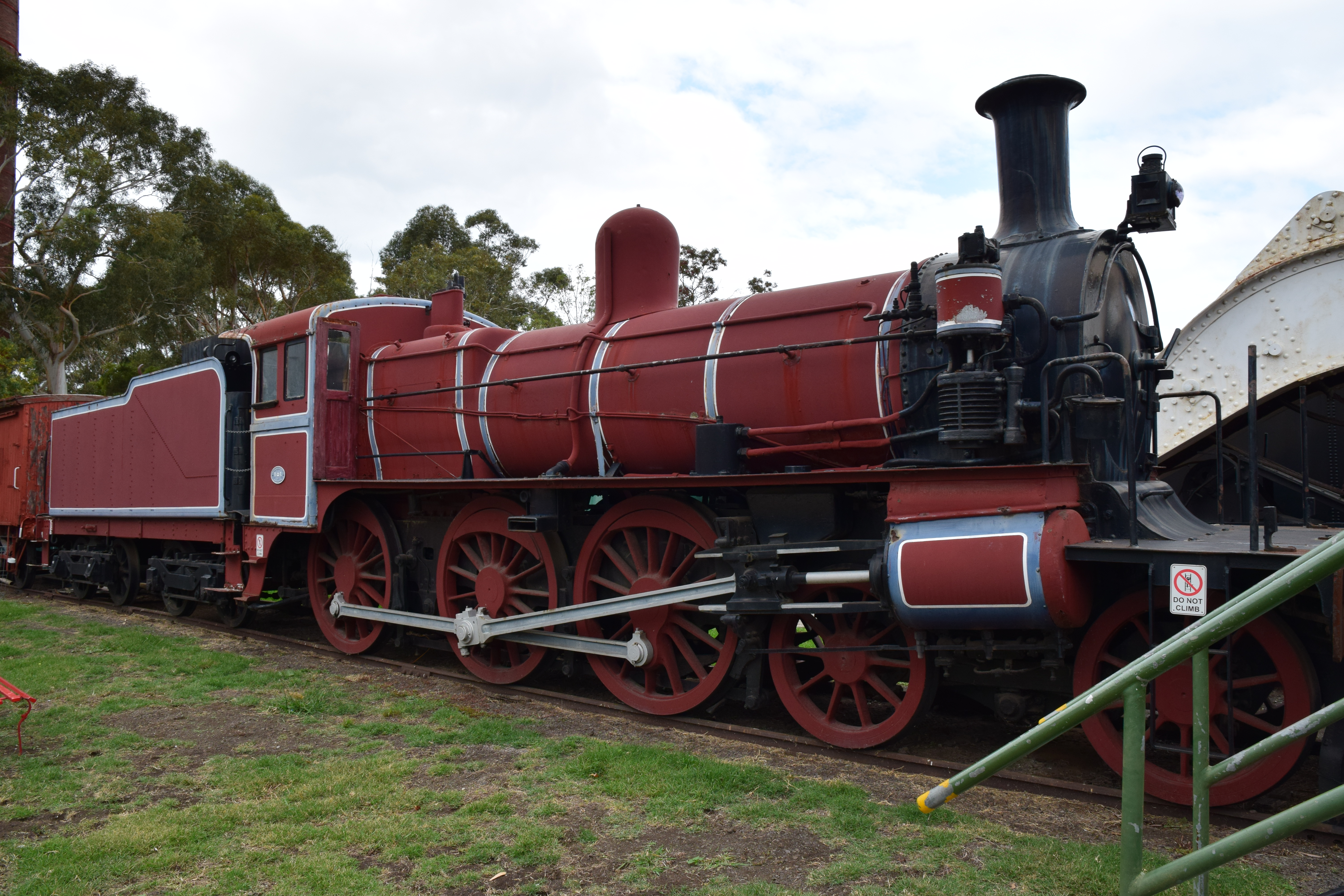
D^{2} 604 at Newport Railway Museum

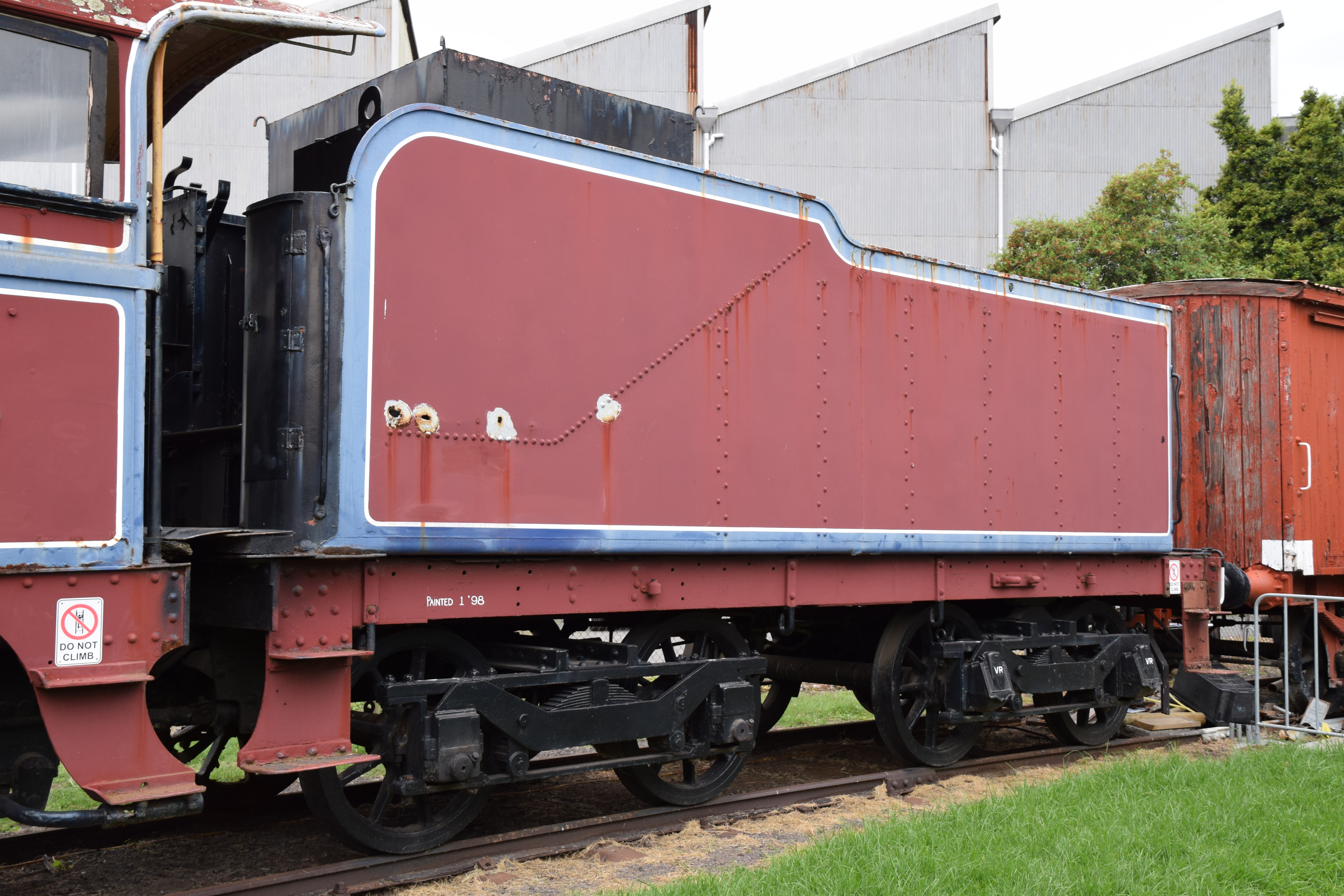
Tender of D^{2} 604, showing the frame is longer than the tank.

To shunt railway wagons around the mill site and on the tramway connecting with the Victorian Railways a variety of engines were used. The first was a small rail tractor built by Malcolm Moore Industries of Port Melbourne in 1939 to assist with construction, and it was joined in 1941 by ex-Victorian Railways locomotive, D^{1} 552, which had been withdrawn as surplus to requirements (despite the ongoing war effort). The tractor unit was later moved to the Broadford site. No further record of D^{1} 552 exists, so it was probably scrapped on site.

In 1951 a pair of 50 t (49 LT) 0-4-4-0 diesel-electric engines were purchased from Whitcomb Locomotive Works, necessary because the increased production had exceeded the capacity of the D1 and tractor. These were serial numbers 61108 and 61109, but on the Tramway they became engines 1 and 2.. Each engine was fitted with a pair of Hercules 160 hp (120 kW), 1800 rpm engines, driving one axle mounted traction motor each with chain drive to the other axle of that bogie. The engines were initially unreliable, with the chains prone to slipping off, and so the Mill purchased another D^{D}-class engine, this time D^{2} 604. as a standby if one of the two Whitcomb engines failed. While at Maryvale the engine was converted from coal to oil burning, and paired with an oil-burning A2 class tender body mounted on the D2's previous tender frame.

Around 1958-59 the Whitcombes were fitted with side rods on each bogie in lieu of the chain drive, resolving the reliability issues, and D^{2} 604 was put into storage at the end of a siding. Later, both locomotives had each of their Hercules diesel engines replaced with General Motors Detroit 6-71 engines, for greater reliability and spare parts supply. In this form they were rated to haul 1,350 t (1,330 LT) on flat track, 350 tonnes (340 LT) on a 1-in-100 slope, or 184 tonnes (181 LT) on a 1-in-50 slope. They were restricted to a maximum speed of 20 mph (32 km/h). As of 1984, one engine was generally in service at the Mill and making delivery runs to and from the exchange sidings, while the other was undergoing routine maintenance.

Both Whitcomb locomotives were withdrawn in September 1988 and scrapped on site. They were replaced first by Victorian Railways' T Class diesel locomotive T334, painted pink from an earlier "Ozride" safety campaign video, and later by classmate T342 painted yellow specifically for APM operation. Around 1990 T342 was withdrawn and replaced by Y173, also painted yellow.

The Malcolm Moore tractor is now preserved at the Victorian Goldfields Railway. D^{2} 604 sold to the Australian Railway Historical Society in 1962, and has been on display since at the Newport Railway Museum. T334 is now with the Mornington Railway, and T342 is also preserved, privately, but based at the Seymour Railway Heritage Centre.

==== Passenger trains ====
The line has seen a total of two passenger trains.

The first was the Royal Train in early 1956, conveying the Duke of Edinburgh who was visiting Victoria at the time, worked from Melbourne by engine L1150 with five carriages, and from Maryvale to the Mill with additional engine T342 attached to the front.

The second train was on 30 May 1984 and put on for the APM Board and guests, for the opening of the new Pine Kraft Pulp Mill. The train left Spencer Street at 8:05 am, running express with engine L1171 to Moe, stopping at Hernes Oak to pass another train, then at Morwell to swap to shunting engine Y175 which took the train on to the plant site. The carriages were, from the east end, ACN39-37BRN-16BN-Club Car No.1-PCO1. The return trip left the Mill at 1:55 pm, changed engines again at Morwell and ran express back to Melbourne, arriving at 4:36 pm.

== Environmental impact ==
Australian Paper has a contract with the Victorian Government for the period 1996–2030 of buying wood at a 1996 fixed price on the logs. This includes mountain ash timber, deemed by scientists to be of high conservation value. In August 2011, Australian Paper withdrew from Forest Stewardship Council (FSC) certification, in order to be able to use wood from old-growth forest logging by VicForests, but remained under the certification of the Australian Forestry Standard. Their previous auditor, SmartWood, was suspended in September 2011 following an FSC internal audit. Later, the company announced that its FSC certification had been retained for all products except Reflex paper. As of 2013, the Reflex 100% recycled paper is FSC-certified.

== See also ==
- List of paper mills
- List of oldest companies in Australia
