= Railway Digest =

Monthly magazine in Australia

- Editor: Harry Windsor
- Categories: Rail transport
- Frequency: Monthly
- Publisher: Australian Railway Historical Society
- First issue: 1963
- Country: Australia
- Based in: Redfern, New South Wales
- Language: Australian English
- Website: www.arhsnsw.com.au
- ISSN: 0157-2431

Railway Digest is a monthly magazine, published in Sydney, covering contemporary railways in Australia.

== Overview ==
The magazine is published by the Australian Railway Historical Society (ARHS), NSW Division. The first issue was in March 1963, under the name New South Wales Digest, and regular publication commenced with the May 1963 edition. It was renamed in January 1983. In January 1985 it changed size from SRA5 to A4.

Originally an enthusiast magazine, mainly focusing on reporting day-to-day workings of the New South Wales Government Railways and its successors, it was produced by volunteers using a hand-operated duplicator at the home of an ARHS member. In May 1993, a paid editor was appointed and the magazine's focus gradually shifted to reporting rail news from across Australia. It has evolved into a professional, full-colour production, directed at the wider community, and commercially distributed to newsagents throughout Australia.

The magazine content is mainly news, with some feature articles. Other state and territory divisions of the ARHS publish their own news magazines, while Australian Railway History is the national magazine, publishing well-researched historical features. As of 2026, it retailed for $16 per issue and had printed and digital subscriptions.

== Publication details ==
- New South Wales Digest, Australian Railway Historical Society, New South Wales Division, 1963
- Railway Digest, Australian Railway Historical Society, New South Wales Division, 1983, ISSN 0157-2431
