= British Australian Tramway =

The British Australian Tramway was operated by the British Australian Timber company at two locations:

- British Australian Tramway, Coffs Harbour, logging railway
- British Australian Tramway, Woolgoolga, logging railway
