= Watson railway station =

Former railway station in Victoria, Australia

Watson

General information
- Coordinates: 38°0′20″S 146°21′15″E
- Line: Walhalla
- Platforms: 1
- Tracks: 1

Other information
- Status: Closed

History
- Opened: 3 May 1910
- Closed: 26 June 1954

Services
Preceding station	Disused railways	Following station
Moondarra	Walhalla line	Collins Siding
	List of closed railway stations in Victoria	
Location

Watson was a railway station on the Walhalla narrow gauge line in Gippsland, Victoria, Australia. The station was opened in 1910, it consisted of a "waiting shed".
