= British Australian Tramway, Coffs Harbour =

Coordinates: 30.30523°S 153.13577°E

British Australian Tramway
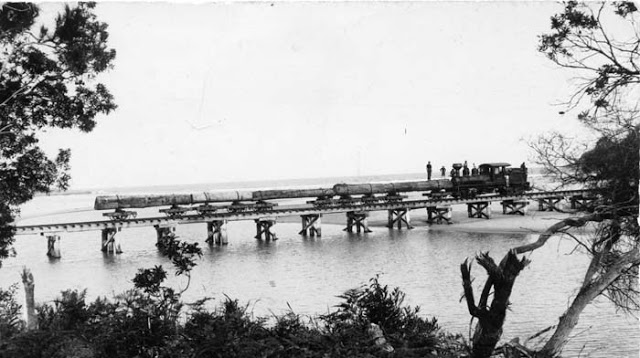
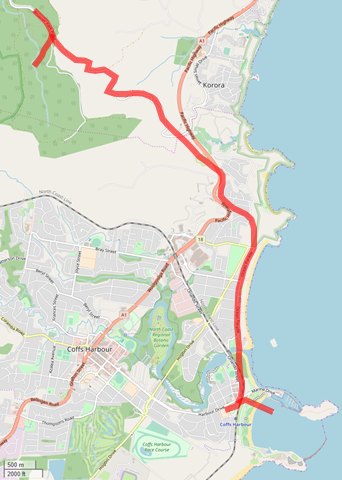
- Shay locomotive on Coffs Creek Bridge Route of the former tramway superimposed onto a modern map

Technical
- Line length: 9 miles (10 km)
- Track gauge: 3 ft 6 in (1,067 mm)
- Minimum radius: 2 chains (40 m)

The British Australian Tramway was a 9 kilometres (5.6 mi) long logging railway with a gauge of 3 ft 6 in (1,067 mm) in Coffs Harbour in the Australian state New South Wales, which operated from 1907 to 1914.

== Set-up and construction ==
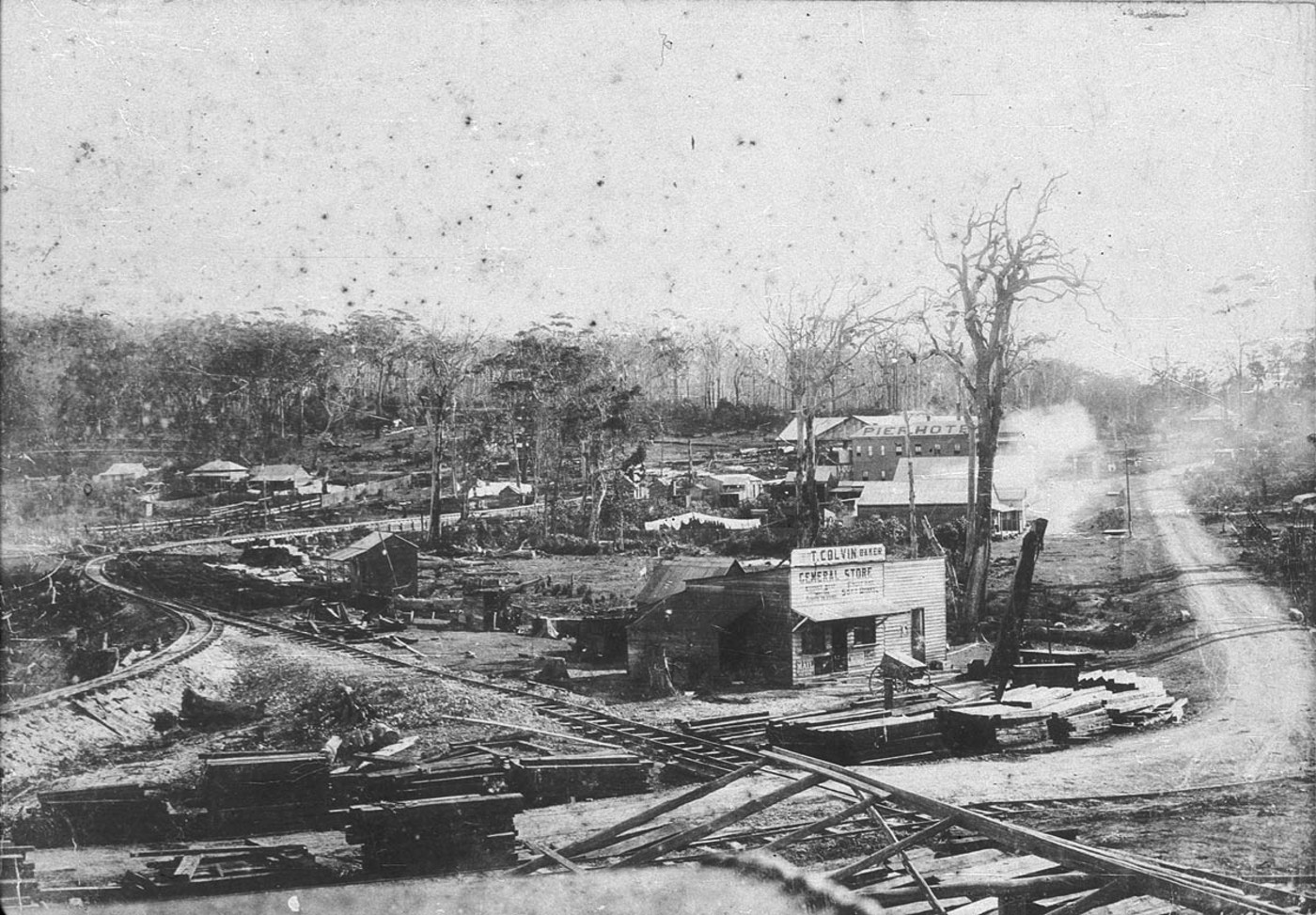
Tramway at the Pier Hotel, 1908

The British Australian Timber Company (BAT Co) was founded in 1906 as a subsidiary of Dalgety Holdings. It purchased in October 1906 a sawmill, which had been set-up in 1903 by George W. Nichols. The deal included machinery and equipment, as well as 2.2 hectares (5.5 acres) of land in Woolgoolga and three log harvesting contracts of 3,500 pounds plus two more sawmills in Woolgoolga and south of it.

In 1907 BAT Co applied for permission to build a forest railway for the transport of logs to the sawmill and began in the same year, shortly after obtaining the approval, with the construction track. BAT Co laid steel rails weighing 17.4 kg/m (35 lb/yd) onto wooden sleepers made of locally harvested and sawn hardwood. The construction cost was 1500 pounds per mile. The line was roughly built, because sharp corners remained at the rail joints, to save construction costs. The ballast consisted of rock or sand. During the construction William Norton died on February 5, 1909, while felling a tree.

== Route ==
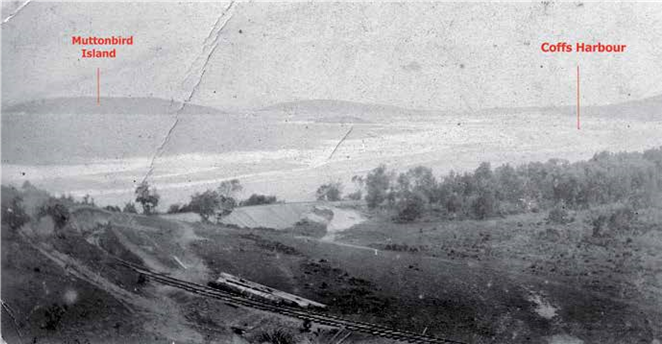
Cutting in Macauley's Headland, circa 1910

From June 1910, the track was laid and in the course of the work, a branch to the jetty was built. For the loading of logs, wooden ramps and steam-powered winches were built along the route. Two round trips per day were carried out transporting six logs per train.

The logging railroad began at the Coffs Harbor jetty, crossed Coffs Creek on a wooden bridge and then ran to Macaulay's Headland, where the first lumberyard was located. As the track was upgraded, the route was extended from Macaulay Headland climbing up the slope to Bruxner Park until the turnoff to Sealy Park Lookout. There it had radii of more than 40 m (2 chain) and a gradient of 4% (1 in 25). The logging railway turned right before reaching the lumberyard on the top of the hill.

== Locomotives ==
The first steam locomotive was procured second-hand in Tasmania in 1904. Originally, it was a 4-6-0 type with two non-driven leading axles and three coupled drive axles before the BAT had one drive axle removed during a conversion so that it had the 4-4-0 wheel arrangement. The locomotive coped well with the journey over Macaulay's Headland, but after the route had been extended to Bruxner Park, it was found to be inadequate. The locomotive was too heavy for the easily laid rails of the forest railway and spread the rails several times in different places. Therefore, Dalgety Holdings sought a more suitable locomotive, and acquired a 25 or 27 ton Shay locomotive, which was delivered on July 8, 1909, on the ship "Cooloon". The Shay could be used without major problems along the entire length of the forest railway.

Manufacturer	Works No	Year	Photo	Type	Comments
Hunslet Engine Company	Ex TMLR No 6 (117/1874)	1874		4-4-0 ex 4-6-0	Derailed often by spreading the track
Lima Locomotive Works	Lima 2135 of 1909	1909		Shay A class	Weight: 25 or 27 t

== Decline and closure ==
The construction of the North Coast Railway had a significant impact on shipping in the region, but also on the operation of BAT Co near to the jetty. Since their sawmill was on the planned route, it came to dispute which lasted until February 1913 and delayed the railway construction in the station area. A fire, the cause of which could not be established beyond doubt, destroyed the sawmill, which subsequently could not be operated for one year. The operation permanently closed in 1916.

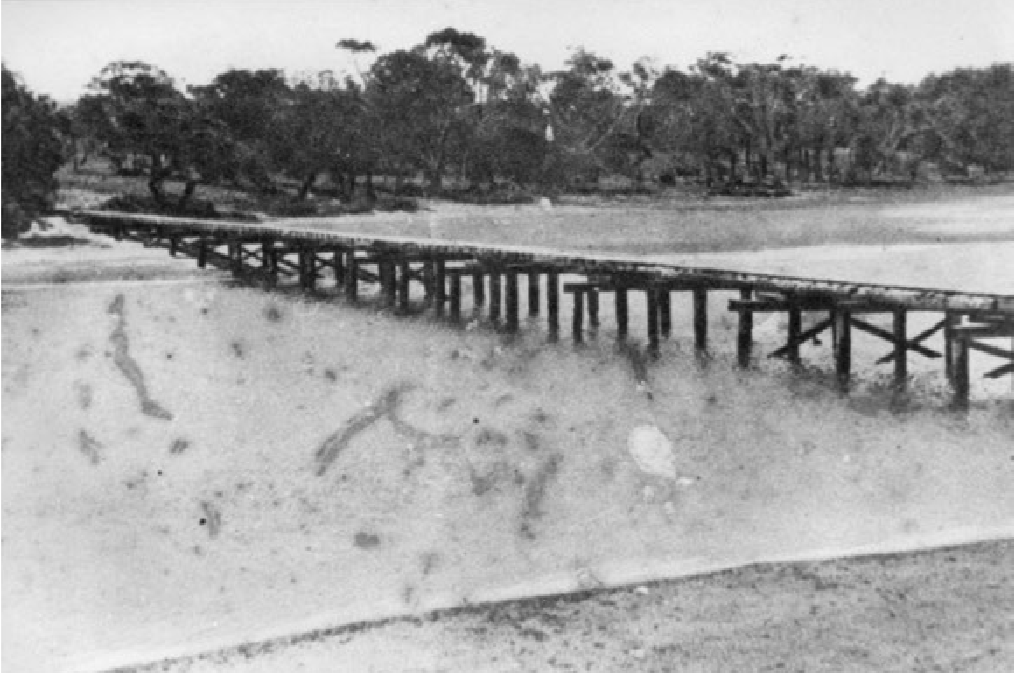
Former tramway bridge over Coffs Creek re-used as a pedestrian bridge

In March 1915, the Coffs Harbour Timber Company (CHT) acquired the rail vehicles, a stationary steam engine as well as 13 km (8 miles) of rails from the BAT Co. The office building of BAT Co. on the corner of Camperdown Street and Nile Street was taken over by the state railways and became the Station Master's Cottage. The tramway bridge over the Coffs Creek remained until 1928 in use as a pedestrian bridge, after wooden planks had been laid onto it. Very little remains are preserved from the tramway. Some rails are left in situ on the beach on the north side of Marina Drive and between the Pacific Highway and turn-off to the Sealy Park Lookout. In the vicinity of Richmond Drive, the remains of a cutting have been preserved on private land and remains of two bridges could be seen in 2012 in the difficult to reach terrain in the Bucca Bucca Creek. The former right-of-way is now mainly used by a modern road.

== Further literature ==
- The British Australian Timber Company Limited (NSW). In: Light Railways No. 238 August 2014, 13 pages.

== See also ==
- British Australian Tramway, Woolgoolga
