= O'Shea and Bennett's Siding =

Former railway station in Victoria, Australia

Coordinates: 37°58′15″S 146°23′40″E

General information
- Line: Walhalla
- Platforms: 0
- Tracks: 3

Other information
- Status: Closed

History
- Opened: 26 April 1921
- Closed: 24 June 1941

Services
Preceding station	Disused railways	Following station
Knott's Siding	Walhalla line	Murie
	List of closed railway stations in Victoria	
Location

O'Shea and Bennett's Siding was a railway siding on the Walhalla narrow gauge line in Gippsland, Victoria, Australia, named for the local sawmill company of William O'Shea and David Bennett. The siding opened in 1921. Located at the down end in a dead end was the White Rock Lime Company's original siding, later moved to Platina. It closed in 1941 under the name Ezard's Siding, the name having been changed after the purchase of O'Shea and Bennett's sawmills by James Ezard in 1931.

The station was situated at the down end of a deep cutting under Boola Road (Walhalla-Tyers Road), adjacent to the intersection with the main Walhalla Road. After the closure of the railway in 1954, the cutting was used as a landfill for the local town's garbage dump.

The Walhalla Goldfields Railway are planning in the long term to rebuild from Thomson to Erica, but as the cutting would need to be re-excavated, the current plan is for an intermediate station to be built at the site of O'Shea and Bennett's Siding.
