= Collins Siding =

Former railway station in Victoria, Australia

Coordinates: 37°59′55″S 146°22′0″E

General information
- Line: Walhalla
- Platforms: 0
- Tracks: 2(NG), 3(2' 6")

Other information
- Status: Closed

History
- Opened: 3 June 1918
- Closed: ?

Services
Preceding station	Disused railways	Following station
Watson	Walhalla line	Erica
	List of closed railway stations in Victoria	
Location

Collins Siding was a railway siding on the Walhalla narrow gauge line in Gippsland, Victoria, Australia. The siding opened in 1918; it served as a junction with the Forests Commission timber tramway which served the Tyers Valley.
