= Morwell railway station =

Railway station in Victoria, Australia

Morwell
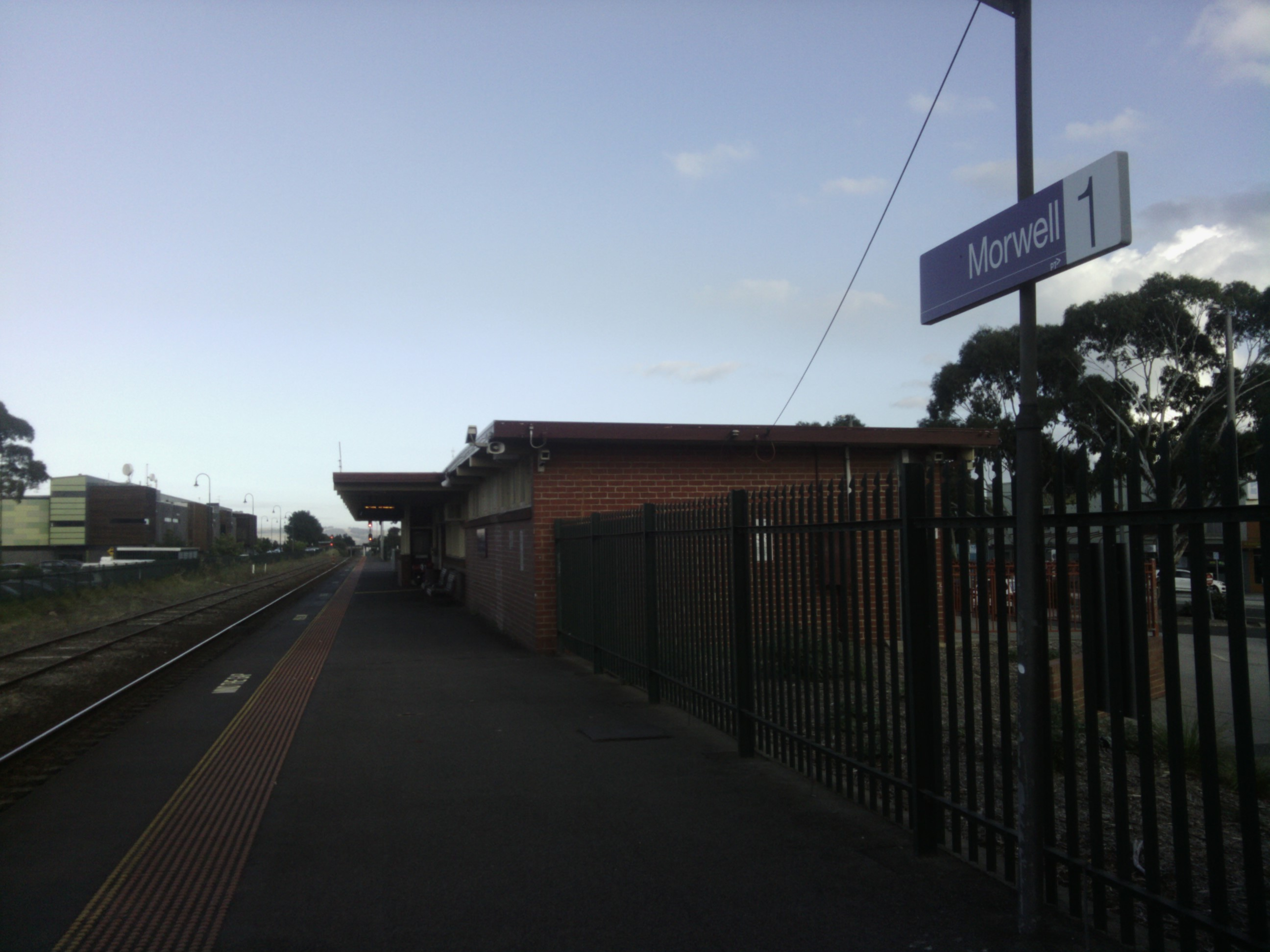
- Westbound view from station platform, February 2015

General information
- Location: Princes Drive, Morwell, Victoria 3840; City of Latrobe; Australia
- Coordinates: 38°14′12″S 146°23′50″E
- System: PTV regional rail station
- Owner: VicTrack
- Operator: V/Line
- Line: Gippsland
- Distance: 144.37 kilometres from Southern Cross
- Platforms: 2
- Tracks: 2
- Train operators: V/Line
- Connections: Bus

Construction
- Structure type: At-grade
- Parking: Yes
- Cycle facilities: Yes
- Accessible: Yes

Other information
- Status: Operational, staffed
- Station code: MWL
- Fare zone: Myki zone 11
- Website: Public Transport Victoria

History
- Opened: 1 June 1877; 149 years ago

Services
Preceding station	V/Line	Following station
Moe towards Southern Cross	Gippsland line	Traralgon Terminus
Moe towards Southern Cross	Gippsland line	Traralgon towards Bairnsdale

Former service
Preceding station	Disused railways	Following station
Terminus	Mirboo North line	Hazelwood
List of closed railway stations in Victoria
Location
- Location within Victoria

Morwell railway station is a regional railway station on the Gippsland line, part of the Victorian railway network. It serves the town of Morwell, in Victoria, Australia. Morwell station is a ground level unstaffed station, featuring two side platforms. It opened on 1 June 1877.

In 2025, the disused track opposite platform 1, which was used in the past when State Electricity Commission and rail freight trains were more common, was converted to a second side platform.

Two branch lines exist at the down end of the station; the Maryvale paper mill branch, and the Energex briquette branch. The former is regularly used for paper trains each weekday, while the latter is not in use. The Energex briquette branch originally opened to traffic in 1951.

== History ==
The station was electrified on 15 March 1956, and had regular electric locomotive services until 2 July 1987. The overhead wires were later removed.

In 1966, a signal panel was provided at the station, when Automatic and Track Control was provided between Morwell and Moe. The panel was abolished on 28 April 2006.

The station was also the terminus of the Mirboo North branch line. The last passenger service operated on 7 September 1968, with passenger services ceasing two days later, on 9 September. The last freight service operated on 18 June 1974, with the line closing six days later, on 24 June.

In 1988, a number of points at the station were abolished, as well as a siding leading to the former dock platform.

The station was upgraded during the early 1990s.

Much of the old yard located adjacent to the station was removed in 2004, as part of works associated with the Regional Fast Rail project. Latrobe City Council's offices now reside in the former location of the yard.

As part of the Regional Rail Revival project, a second platform will be constructed at the station, and will include upgraded accessibility improvements. The crossing loop, located in the up direction of the station, will also be extended as part of the project, using the old disused track.

The crossing loop had been installed on 28th July 2025 connecting the second platform and allowing trains to use both platforms increasing the number of possible trains per hour. With the new timetable change trains are expected to run every 40 minutes servicing Morwell.

== Platforms and services ==
Morwell has one platform. It is serviced by V/Line Traralgon and Bairnsdale line services.

Morwell platform arrangement
Platform	Line	Destination
1	Traralgon line Bairnsdale line	Southern Cross
2	Traralgon line Bairnsdale line	Traralgon, Bairnsdale

== Transport links ==
Latrobe Valley Bus Lines operates five routes via Morwell station, under contract to Public Transport Victoria:

- 1 : Moe – Traralgon
- 2 : Morwell – Churchill
- 8 : Traralgon – Moe station
- 21 : to Mid Valley Shopping Centre
- 22 : to Mid Valley Shopping Centre

South Coast Bus operates one route via Morwell station, under contract to Public Transport Victoria:

- Wonthaggi – Traralgon station

Warragul Bus Lines operates two routes via Morwell station, under contract to Public Transport Victoria:

- Garfield station – Traralgon Plaza
- Traralgon station – Drouin North
