= Knott's Siding =

Former railway station in Victoria, Australia

Coordinates: 37°58′11″S 146°23′40″E

General information
- Line: Walhalla
- Platforms: 0
- Tracks: 2

Other information
- Status: Closed

History
- Opened: 3 May 1910
- Closed: June 1941

Services
Preceding station	Disused railways	Following station
Erica	Walhalla line	O'Shea and Bennett's Siding
	List of closed railway stations in Victoria	
Location

Knott's Siding was a railway siding on the Erica narrow gauge line in Gippsland, Victoria, Australia. The siding opened with the line. After the closure of nearby Murie station in April 1914, the siding was opened to passenger traffic.

In 1922 a second siding was opened on the Knott's Siding known as Fullwood's Siding, this operated until 1941. The main Knott's Siding was closed in 1922, and was used only as a shunt from Fullwood's siding.
