= Murie railway station =

Former railway station in Victoria, Australia

Coordinates: 37°58′30″S 146°24′30″E

Murie

General information
- Line: Walhalla
- Platforms: 1
- Tracks: 1

Other information
- Status: Closed

History
- Opened: 3 May 1910
- Closed: 22 April 1914

Services
Preceding station	Disused railways	Following station
O'Shea and Bennett's Siding	Walhalla line	Platina
	List of closed railway stations in Victoria	
Location

Murie was a railway station on the Walhalla narrow gauge line in Gippsland, Victoria, Australia. The station was opened in 1910 and was closed on 22 April 1914. In lieu of Murie station, Knott's Siding, located a half-mile towards Moe, was opened to passenger traffic.
