= Erica railway station =

Former railway station in Victoria, Australia

Coordinates: 37°58′50″S 146°22′20″E

Erica

General information
- Line: Walhalla
- Platforms: 1
- Tracks: 3

Other information
- Status: Closed

History
- Opened: 3 May 1910
- Closed: 25 June 1954

Services
Preceding station	Disused railways	Following station
Collins Siding	Walhalla line	Knott's Siding
	List of closed railway stations in Victoria	
Location

Erica was a railway station on the Walhalla narrow gauge line in Gippsland, Victoria, Australia. Officially opened in 1910, it became the terminus of the line on 4 October 1952, following the closure of the section of track to Platina, and closed on 25 June 1954.

From 1941 onwards, the station had sidings serving a Forests Commission timber mill.

Before the line opened, Erica was to be named Upper Moondarra, but was renamed Moondarra prior to 15 June 1908, and then renamed Harris, after Albert Harris, the member of parliament for Walhalla. In 1914, it was renamed Erica after a local mountain.

The site is currently leased by a caravan park, although it is planned to be the ultimate western terminus for the Walhalla Goldfields Railway.
