= Australian Railway Historical Society =

Society preserving Australian railway operations

Coordinates: 37.8542719°S 144.8814227°E

- Abbreviation: ARHS
- Formation: 1933
- Founded at: Sydney, New South Wales
- Type: Railway historical and preservation organisation
- Purpose: History and preservation of railway heritage
- Headquarters: Alexandria, New South Wales (NSW Division/Railway Resource Centre)
- Region served: Australia
- Products: Books, national and divisional Magazines
- Services: Museum operation, heritage train trips, historical research, archival management
- Members: 2,500 (individual)
- Publication: Australian Railway History, Railway Digest
- Subsidiaries: State Divisions (e.g., NSW, QLD, SA, WA)
- Formerly called: The Railway Circle (1933); Australasian Railway and Locomotive Historical Society (c. 1933–1952)

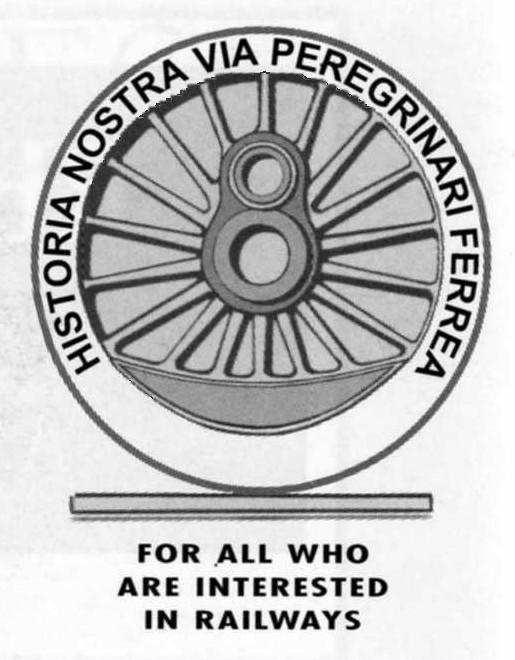

The Australian Railway Historical Society (ARHS) is a railway organisation concerned with history and preservation of railway heritage at a national level.

It has had divisions in every state and the Australian Capital Territory, although the ACT division was wound up in 2016, along with the Victorian division in 2020. Since 1967, when each division incorporated, the state divisions operated as separate entities. Each still trades under the ARHS brand, except in Western Australia, where the division is called Rail Heritage WA. Individual membership exceeds 2,500.

== Background ==
The ARHS was founded in Sydney in 1933 as The Railway Circle, becoming the Australasian Railway and Locomotive Historical Society shortly afterwards. The society's name was changed to the present form in 1952.

Divisions were later formed in other states, most of which established a railway museum:

- ACT – Canberra Railway Museum, Kingston
- Queensland – Rosewood Railway Museum
- South Australia – operated the Mile End Railway Museum from 1964 to 1988, when the exhibits were moved to Port Adelaide, becoming, in 1999, the National Railway Museum. Meanwhile, the Division had set up a train-operating arm, SteamRanger Heritage Railway, which operates the Victor Harbor line as a working museum.
- Victoria – Australian Railway Historical Society Museum, Williamstown North
- Western Australia – Western Australian Rail Transport Museum, Bassendean

In February 2015, the ACT division commenced operating scrap metal services from Fyshwick to Port Botany through its commercial division, Espee Railroad Services, with locomotives and wagons leased from CFCL Australia. In November 2016, the Canberra Railway Museum was suddenly closed after the commercial division, which had been started to subsidise popular but expensive heritage train trips, collapsed with more than $700,000 of debt. That led to the ACT Division of the ARHS being placed into liquidation.

In July 2020, the Victorian Division was wound up, as the result of a number of civil claims made against it by those who, as children, were abused by ARHS volunteers.

Both the Canberra Railway Museum (Capital Region Heritage Rail) and the Newport Railway Museum are now run by organisations separate from the ARHS. In the latter case, Newport Railway Museum Inc., formed by museum volunteers, entered into an arrangement with VicTrack to take over the museum site lease

== Railway Resource Centre ==
Located at the Alexandria premises of the New South Wales Division, the Railway Resource Centre is a collection of historical material pertaining to Australian railways, managed by the Society and volunteers. Access to the collection is available to members and to the general public for private research only. It houses thousands of documents, books, periodicals, photographs and slides which the Society has acquired over many years. It is constantly being added to by acquisitions through donations and bequests from Australian Railway Historical Society members and others.

== Publications ==
=== Books ===
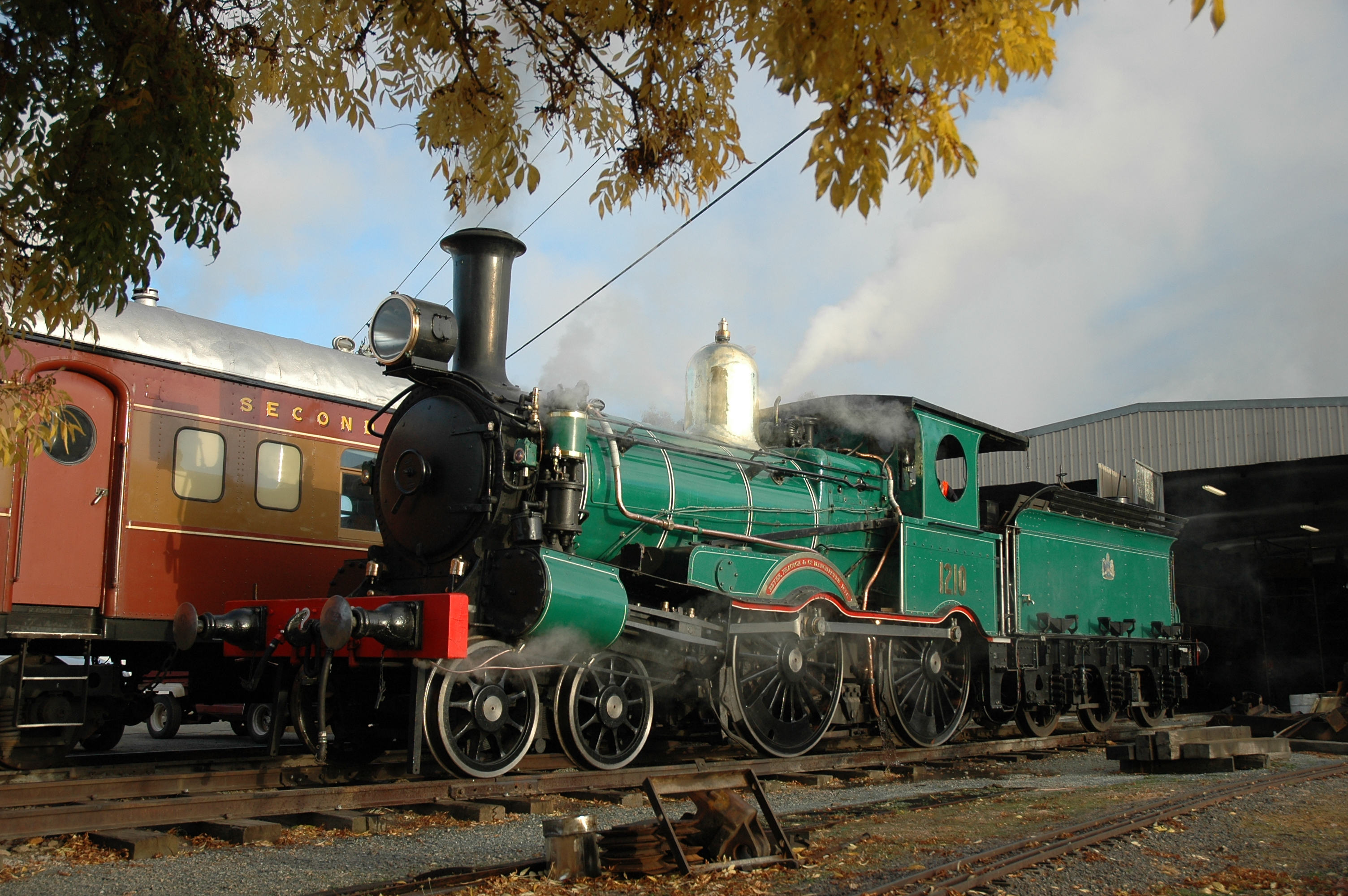
1210 at the Canberra Railway Museum in April 2011

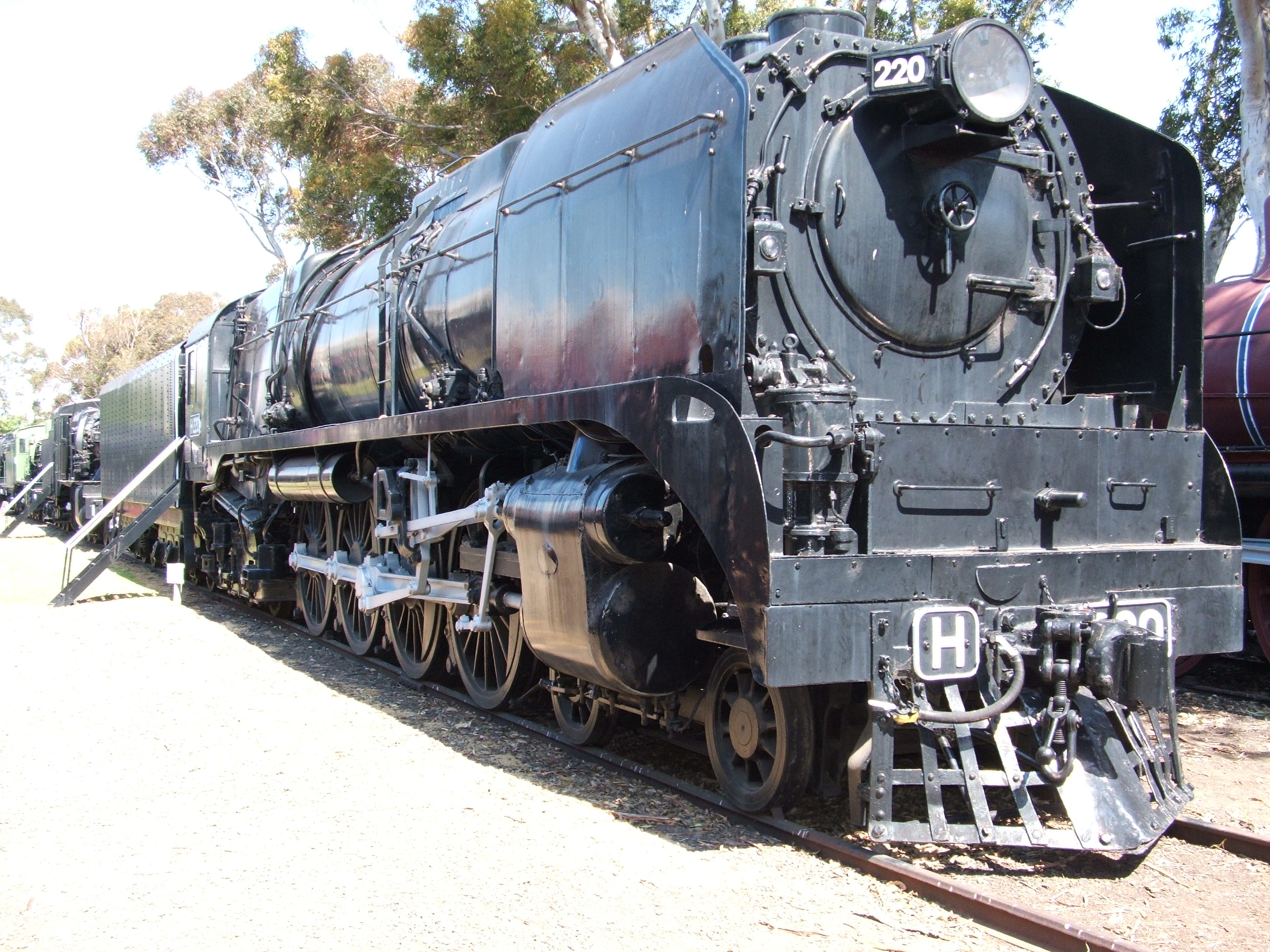
H220 at the Australian Railway Historical Society Museum in October 2006

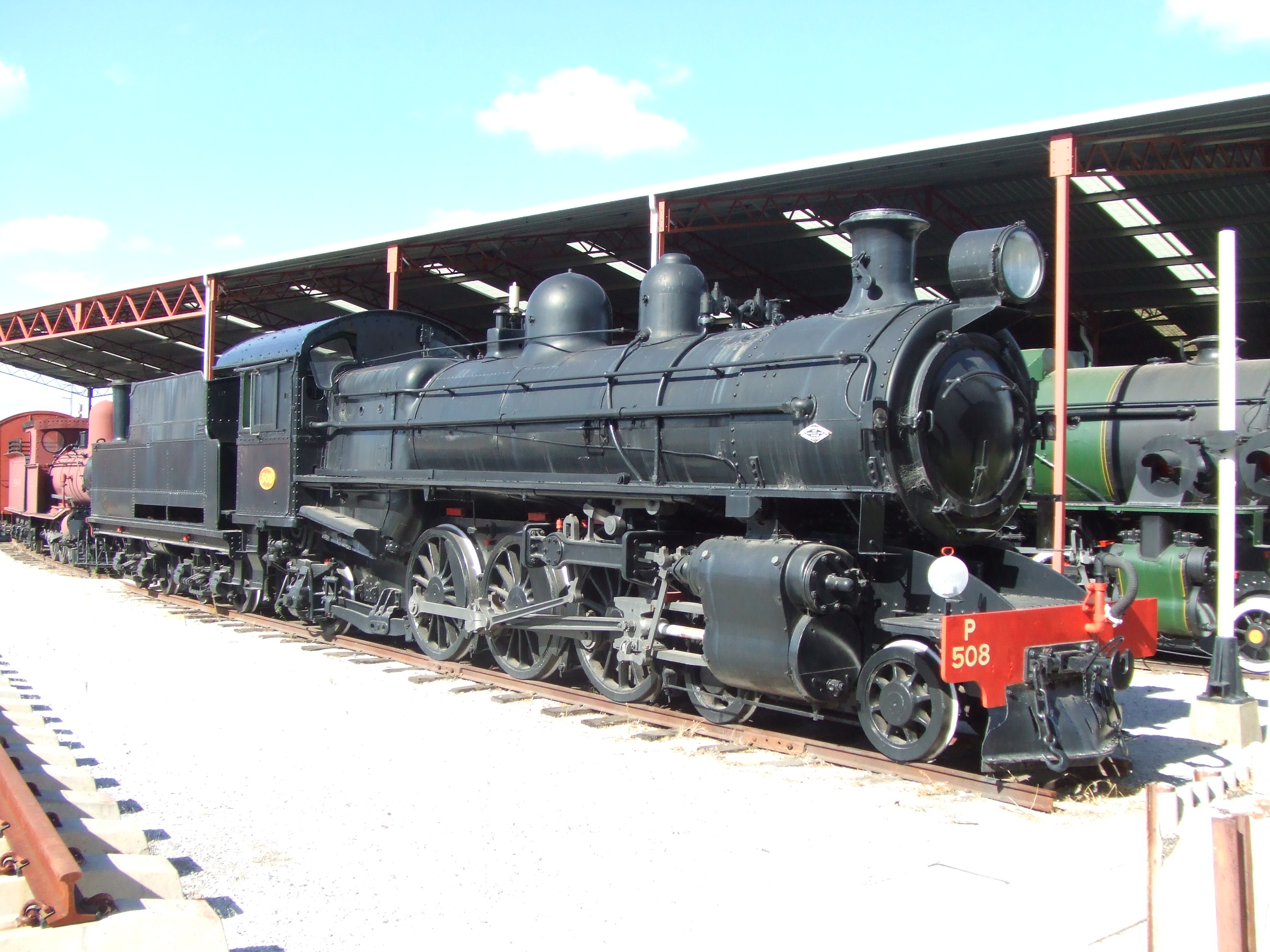
P508 at the Western Australian Rail Transport Museum in April 2006

Each division has published and supported publishing of books and pamphlets about the history of regional railways. Significantly divisions have been the main resource of expertise in creating centenary and other anniversary publications regarding rail history.

The New South Wales Division operates a shop in Alexandria. The NSW division also maintains the Railway Resource Centre. The centre houses the thousands of documents, books, periodicals, photographs and slides that the society has acquired over many years.

=== National magazines ===
==== Australian Railway History ====
In October 1937, Australasian Railway and Locomotive Historical Society Bulletin was launched by the New South Wales Division. In May 1950, it was relaunched as the Australian Railway History Society Bulletin. In January 2004, it was renamed Australian Railway History, and is published monthly.

Australian Railway Historyincludes historical material from all states and territories.

==== Railway Digest ====
In March 1963, the New South Wales division launched Railway Digest as a national magazine covering contemporary railway matters. It is published monthly and is sold in newsagents.

=== Divisional magazines ===
Some divisions publish magazines at various frequencies. The state and divisions of the society publish magazines that vary in content and depth, but which provide items of local information about their state railway history and activities.

==== Newsrail ====
In November 1957, the Victorian Division launched Divisional Diary. From 1958 until 1965, it was also the publication of the Tasmanian division. In January 1973, Divisional Diary was replaced by Newsrail. It is published monthly. Since the winding-up of the Victorian Division in mid-2020, the magazine has been published by Victorian Rail Publishing Inc.

==== Sunshine Express ====
After publishing a supplement within the Australian Railway Historical Society Bulletin for 16 issues, in February 1966, the Queensland division launched Sunshine Express. In 1968, annual publication was increased from six issues to eight. As of 2023, it is published every two months.

==== Tasmanian Rail News ====
From 1958 until 1965, the Victorian Division publication, Divisional Diary, also served as the Tasmanian Division's publication. In August 1965, Rail News was launched, which was renamed Tasmanian Rail News in July 1968.

==== The Recorder ====
In October 1963, the South Australian division launched The Recorder. In May 1992, The Recorder ceased publication when the ARHS decided to pool resources with the National Railway Museum's Catch Point Magazine. The arrangement ceased in December 2008; the museum continues to publish Catchpoint every two months.

==== The Westland ====
In July 1972, the Western Australian division launched The Westland Express. It ceased in June 1973 after 12 issues. In January 1985, it was revived as The Westland. Publication ceased in 2019 after 287 issues.

== Affiliations ==
Other societies and organisations with which the Australian Railway Historical Society is affiliated include:-

- Australian Electric Traction Association
- Canadian Railroad Historical Association
- East Coast Heritage Rail
- Irish Railway Record Society
- Light Railway Research Society of Australia
- Light Rail Transit Association (UK)
- Narrow Gauge Railway Society (UK)
- National Railway Historical Society (USA)
- NSW Rail Museum
- New Zealand Railway & Locomotive Society
- Rail Motor Society
- Railway Correspondence & Travel Society (UK)
- Railway Society of Southern Africa
- Royal Australian Historical Society

=== Other groups ===
Rail heritage is not the exclusive domain of the ARHS in Australia, and at various stages other groups of enthusiasts and individuals have endeavoured to create niches in the publishing and rail heritage businesses.

== See also ==
- History of rail transport in Australia overall history plus bibliographies
- List of railroad-related periodicals
