= Coffs Harbour Timber Company =

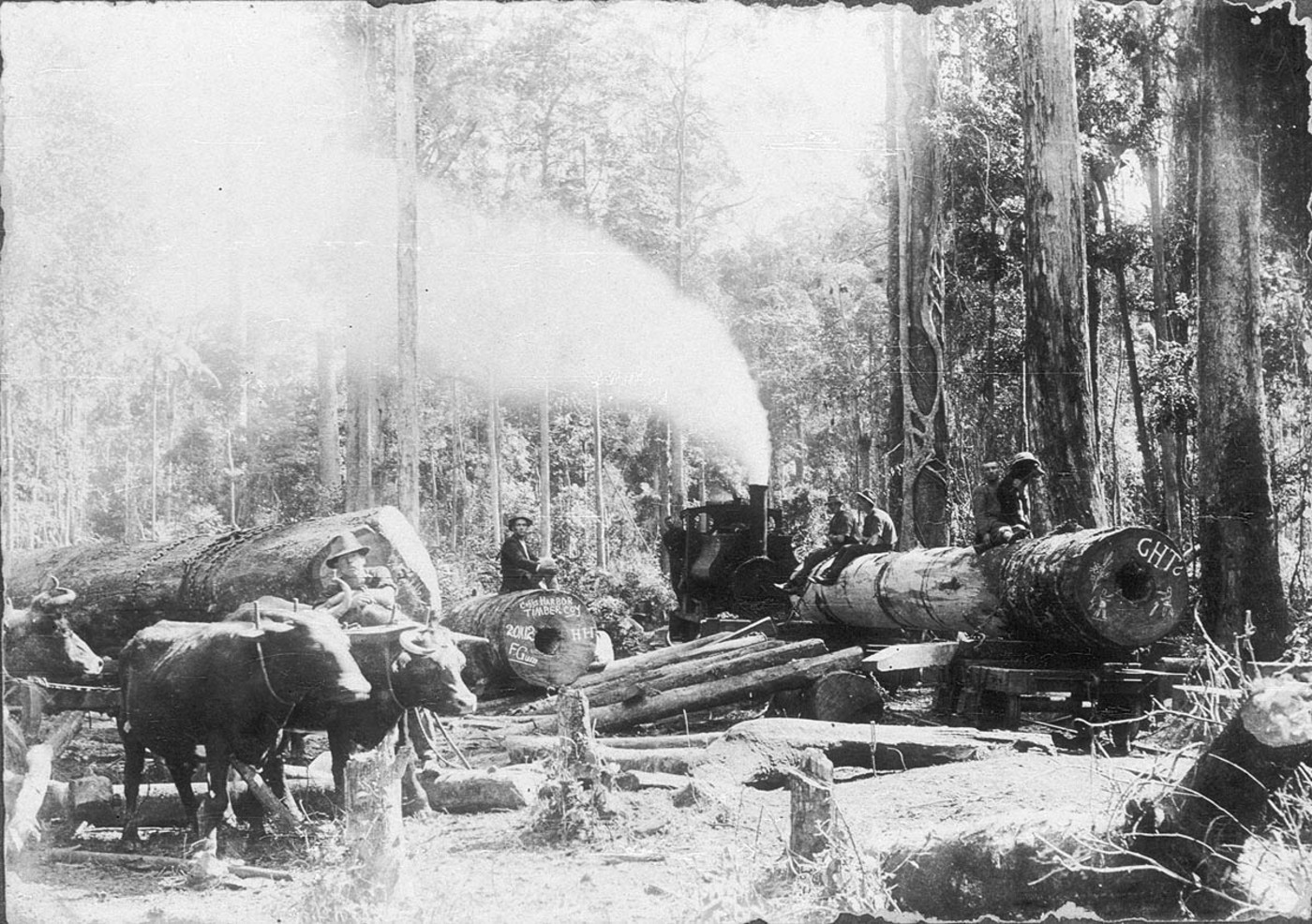
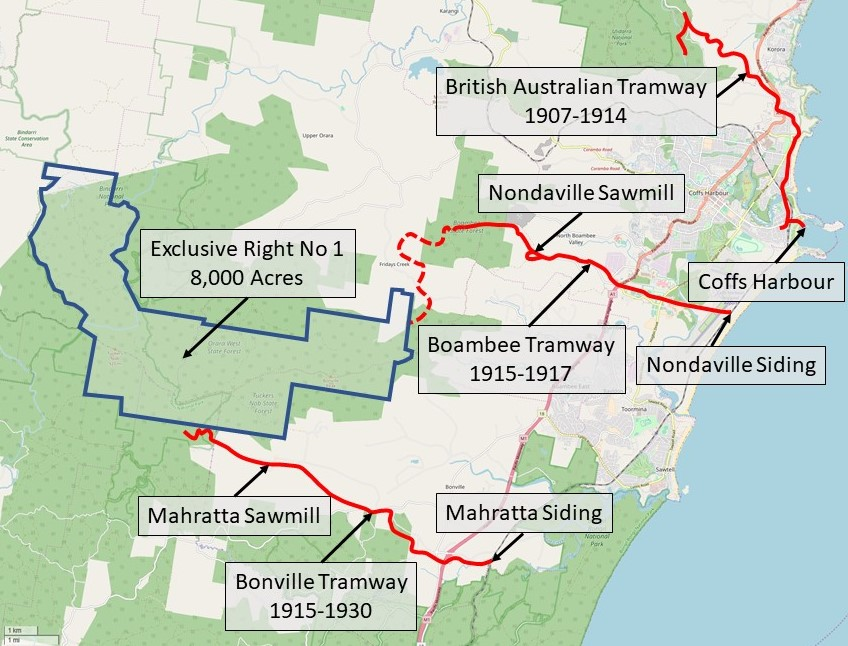
- The bullocks Bright and Lively transfer flooded gum logs from Matt Singleton's property onto the tramline of Coffs Harbour Timber Co. Routes of former tramways superimposed onto modern map

Technical
- Track gauge: 3 ft 6 in (1,067 mm)

The Coffs Harbour Timber Company (CHT) operated two sawmills and two logging railways with a gauge of 3 ft 6 in (1,067 mm) south of Coffs Harbour in the Australian state New South Wales.

== History ==
The Coffs Harbor Timber Company was headquartered on Castlereagh Street in Sydney. C.W. Elliot and A.C. Mackay were their managing directors. They had hoped to transport their timber from Maharratta (Bonville) and Nondaville (Boambee) to the port of Coffs Harbor, but in 1913 they experienced unforeseen delays in obtaining rails for section No. 7 from Raleigh to Coffs Harbor.

In March 1915, the Coffs Harbour Timber Company (CHT) acquired the rail vehicles, a stationary steam engine as well as 12. 9 km (8 miles) of rails from the British Australian Timber Company. Their Bonville Mill was opened in 1912 and their Boambee Mill in 1913. Both sawmills and the associated logging railways had a value of 50 to 60 thousand Pounds. On 1 March 1918 it was announced that the Boambee Mill should be closed. It was closed in February 1919, and the CHT was liquidated in 1931, which also led to the closure of the Bonville Mill.

== Locomotives ==
Manufacturer	Works No	Year	Photo	Type	Comments
Andrew Barclay Sons & Co.	B/No. 237	1881		0-4-0ST	Small locomotive with extra tank on top of the saddle tank and a self-made tender
Lima Locomotive Works	Lima 2135 of 1909	1909		Shay A class	Purchased from British Australian Tramway

== Further literature ==
- Ian McNeil: The Coffs Harbour Timber Company Limited – Part 1 - Nondaville Mill and the Boambee Timber Tramway (NSW). In: Light Railways No. 251 October 2016.
- Coffs Harbour City Council: Bridge - trestle remnant. Coffs Harbour, SHI number 1360029.
- Coffs Harbour Heritage Study 2015. October 2015.
