= Newsrail =

Australian monthly railway magazine

- Newsrail magazine cover
- Editor: John Hawthorne
- Frequency: Monthly
- Format: A4
- Circulation: 5,000
- Publisher: Victorian Rail Publishing Inc.
- Founded: 1957 (as Divisional Diary)
- Country: Australia
- Based in: Melbourne, Victoria
- Language: English
- Website: Official website
- ISSN: 0310-7477

Newsrail is a monthly railway magazine covering the railways and tramways of Victoria, Australia. It was launched in January 1973 by the Victorian Division of the Australian Railway Historical Society, superseding Divisional Diary, that had been published by the society since November 1957.

Since May 2020, the magazine has been published by Victorian Rail Publishing Inc.

== Details ==
- Issue December 2019 is Vol 47 No. 12.
- Period = monthly
- Size = 245 mm (H) by 170 mm (W) (to Dec 1991), A4 (from Jan 1992)
