= Australian Railway History =

Magazine published in New South Wales, Australia

- Categories: Rail transport
- Frequency: Monthly
- Publisher: Australian Railway Historical Society
- Founded: 1937
- Country: Australia
- Based in: Redfern
- Language: Australian English
- Website: arhsnsw.com.au
- ISSN: 1449-6291

Australian Railway History is a monthly magazine covering railway history in Australia, published by the New South Wales Division of the Australian Railway Historical Society on behalf of its state and territory Divisions.

== History and profile ==
It was first published in 1937 as the Australasian Railway and Locomotive Historical Society Bulletin.

It was renamed ARHS Bulletin in 1952.

In January 2004, the magazine was re-branded as Australian Railway History. Historically, the magazine had a mix of articles dealing with historical material and items on current events drawn from its affiliate publications. Today, it contains only historical articles, two or three of them being in-depth.

== Publication details ==
- Australian Railway History: bulletin of the Australian Railway Historical Society Redfern, New South Wales ISSN 1449-6291 Vol. 55, no. 795 (Jan. 2004)-
- Bulletin (Australian Railway Historical Society) Redfern, New South Wales 1952-2003 ISSN 0005-0105. New ser., v. 3, no. 178 (Aug. 1952)-v. 54, no. 794 (Dec. 2003)
