= Sydney Express (passenger train) =

Former Australian train service

The Sydney Express
- Stock type: Passenger train
- In service: 1883–1937 (superseded in Victoria); 1883–1949 (superseded in New South Wales); 1986–1993 (revived name)
- Retired: 1937 (Victoria); 1949 (New South Wales); 1993 (revived name)
- Successor: Spirit of Progress (Victoria, 1937); Riverina Express (New South Wales, 1949); Sydney/Melbourne Express (1986 merge)
- Operators: Victorian Railways; New South Wales Government Railways
- Lines served: North East line (Victoria); Main Southern line (New South Wales)

Specifications
- Bogies: Six-wheel bogie carriages
- Seating: Pullman sleeping cars
- Track gauge: Broad gauge (Victoria); Standard gauge (New South Wales)

The Sydney Express was a passenger train which operated between Australia's two most populous cities, Melbourne and Sydney, between 1883 and 1937. The service commenced when the Victorian (broad gauge) railway was extended across the Murray River to Albury to link with New South Wales' standard gauge line. The Sydney Express was superseded in 1937 by the Spirit of Progress, which also terminated at Albury until 1962, when the North East railway line was converted to standard gauge allowing it, and the new Southern Aurora to operate through to Sydney.

== History ==
=== Melbourne – Wodonga ===
In 1868 definite plans were made by the Victorian government for continuation of the North East railway line at Kilmore to the Victorian town of Wodonga on the opposite side of the Murray River to Albury, an important town for river transportation and the customs posts which regulated commerce between the two colonies. Extension of the railway, which passed through Benalla, Wangaratta, and Chiltern, was completed in November 1873. The tiny township of Wodonga (population 788) profited little from the arrival of the railway, most travellers preferring to continue on by stagecoach to Albury, with a population (1881 census) of 5,715. Before 1883 passengers to Sydney were obliged to take the Cobb & Co coach to the furthest southerly extent of the NSW railways, which for some time was Bethungra.

=== Sydney – Albury ===
New South Wales interests were uneasy about the rapid advances being made by the Victorian Railways in business with the Riverina district of New South Wales. The Main Southern railway line from Sydney reached Murrumburrah in March 1877, Cootamundra in November 1877, North Wagga Wagga in September 1878 and South Wagga Wagga a year later. The line was opened to Albury on 3 February 1881.

=== Crossing the Murray ===
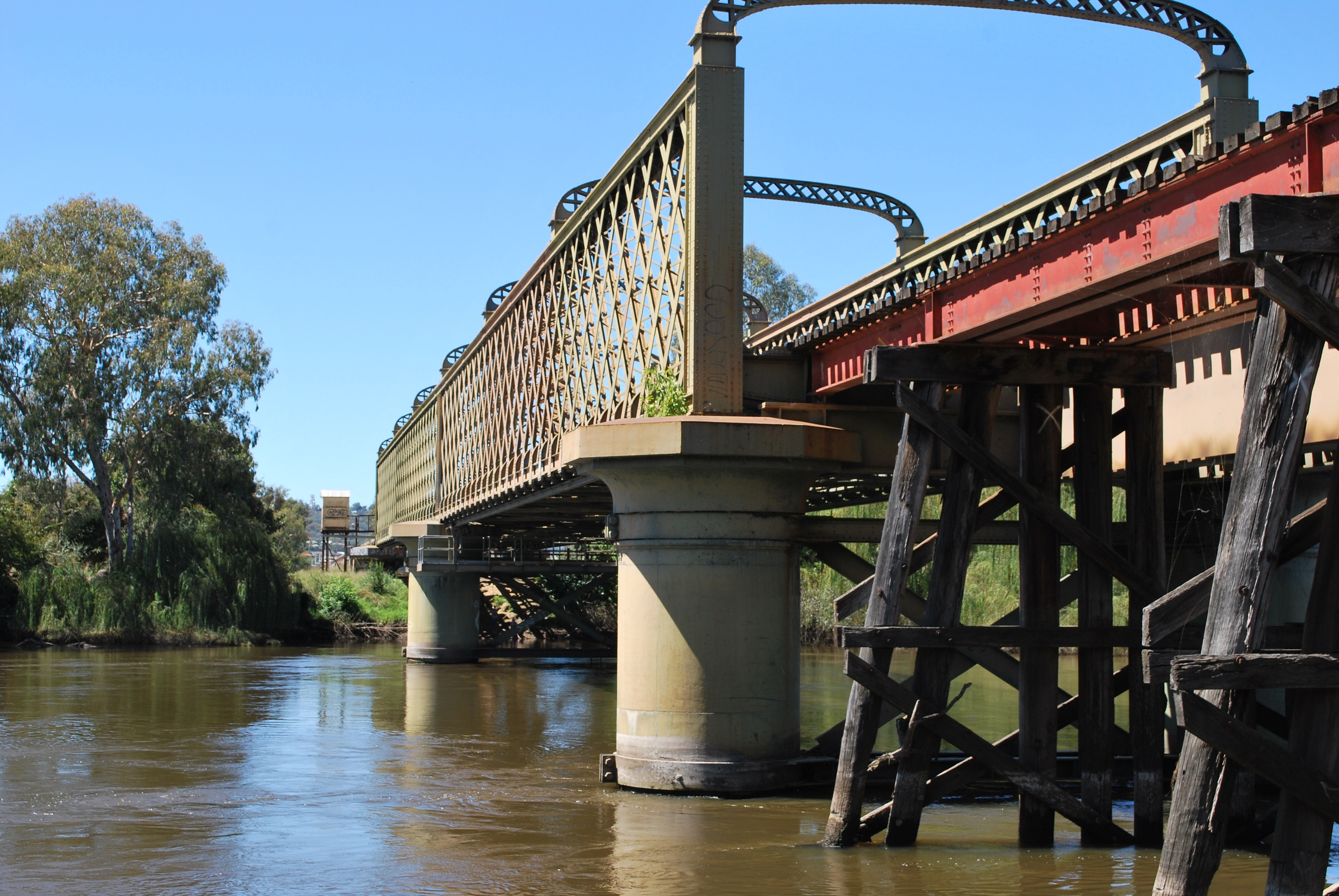
Albury-Wodonga Railway Bridge

The Sydney Express, between Australia's two most populous cities officially began on 14 June 1883 when the broad gauge line from Melbourne was extended over the Murray to Albury via the Albury-Wodonga Railway Bridge and passengers and goods were able, customs permitting, to cross from one side of No. 1 platform to the other, and continue their journey.

The first rail crossing was by a temporary wooden bridge erected by the Victorian government, while the permanent structure was to be a NSW responsibility, the cost of both being shared by the two colonies. The components for the massive iron bridge had to be ordered from England. The piers were 9 feet (2.7 m) diameter cast iron cylinders, sunk deep into the river bed and filled with concrete. Construction of the iron bridge began in 1883 and it was open to rail traffic in August 1884.

Initially the bridge carried both standard and broad-gauge lines so that the south-bound train could terminate at Wodonga, but this hated practice was discontinued from 1 March 1886 and Albury became the transfer point in both directions for passengers and freight. As a concession to Wodonga, transfer of livestock would be made on that side of the river.

=== Customs ===
Before Federation, customs duties and excise were a major source of revenue for the individual colonies, and each had its own scale of charges for goods crossing their border, depending on producers they wished to protect or vices to discourage. Dutiable goods and the tariff charged on each was subject to change with every change of government; the schedule of charges for 1200 classes of goods in the Australian Year Book occupying 30 closely printed pages. New South Wales and Victoria each had two customs houses through which every traveller and his luggage had to pass.

=== The service ===
From August 1883 the Sydney Express left Spencer Street station, Melbourne at 18:55 every weekday and arrived at Albury 22:50 the same night, a journey of 198.5 miles (319 km) in 5 hours and 55 minutes. (Note: The discrepancy arises from the (then) 25 minute time difference between the two colonies.) There was a break of half an hour and the train for Sydney left at 23:45 and arrived at Redfern at 13:45 the following day, 475 miles (764 km) in 14 hours, total 576.5 miles (928 km) in 21 hours; four hours quicker than the regular service, with stops at intermediate stations.

The Melbourne Express or The Overland, (Note: Both these terms have also been applied to the Melbourne/Adelaide Express between those two cities) as the reciprocal service was variously named, left Sydney at 17:00 and arrived at Albury at 07:00 and Melbourne at 14:00 the following day. The timetable was designed specifically for the convenience of those who had to transact banking business at the other city. The timetable also had to minimise interference with ordinary traffic.

The service was popular, especially with the sport-loving community, and great strides were made in comfort with six-wheel bogie carriages and Pullman sleeping cars, and with some improvement in times — Albury to Sydney had been cut by nearly an hour by a P6 class locomotive in New South Wales from 1901 (when the Wagga bridge was upgraded), while Victoria went for the Dd class, followed in 1907 by the A2 class (which was not replaced until 1928 by S class), but any gains in time were offset by additional stops, and that part of the journey was actually lengthened by 20 minutes.

The Sydney Express was superseded in Victoria in 1937 by the Spirit of Progress. The New South Wales portion continued to be named the Sydney Express until superseded by the Riverina Express in 1949. After the North East line was converted to standard gauge in 1962, the Spirit of Progress was extended to Sydney and complemented by the Southern Aurora.

The Sydney Express name was revived in 1986 after the Spirit of Progress and Southern Aurora were merged into one train, the Sydney/Melbourne Express. It ceased in 1993.
