= New South Wales stainless steel carriage stock =

Former passenger carriage operated in Australia

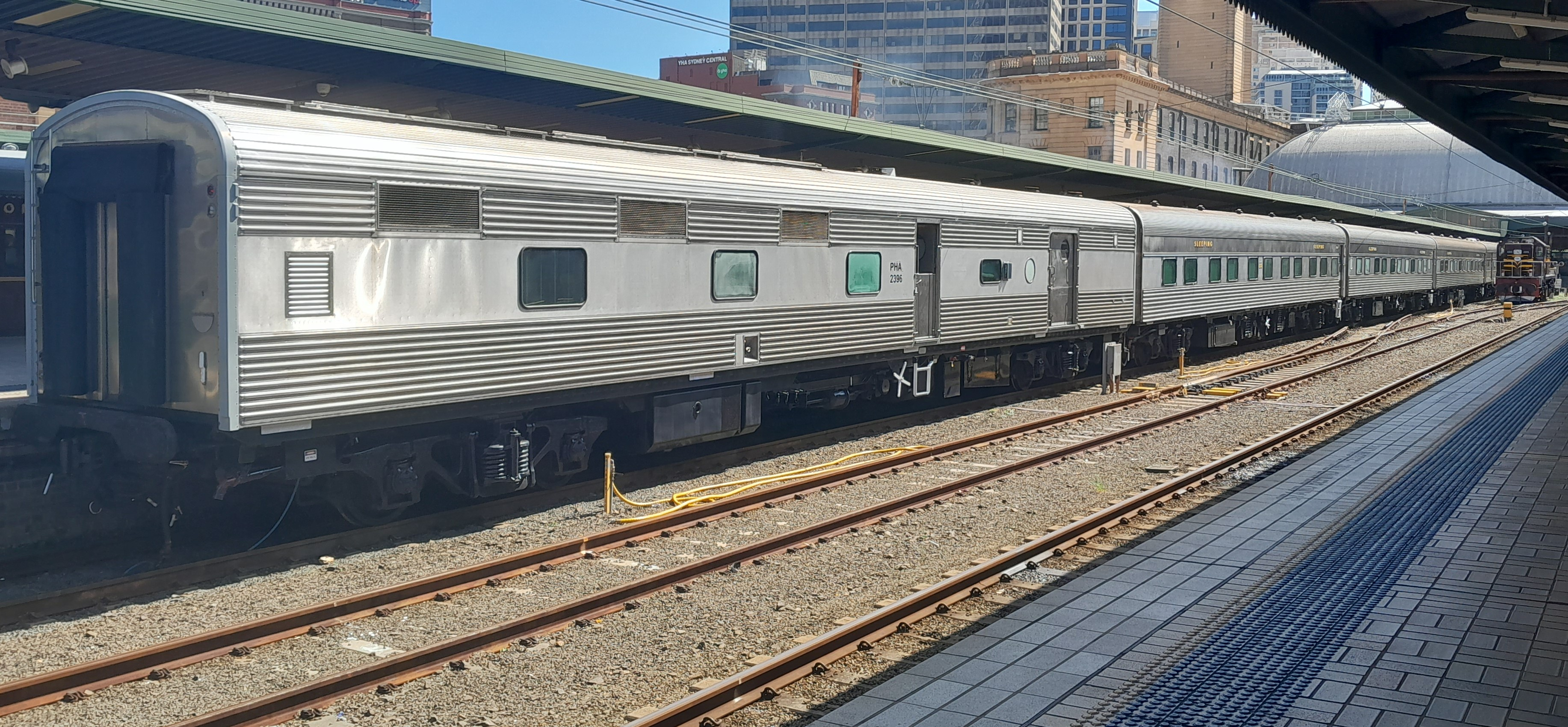
- A consist of carriages in 2025
- In service: 1964-1993
- Manufacturers: Commonwealth Engineering; A Goninan & Co
- Number built: 72
- Number in service: 5
- Number preserved: 54
- Number scrapped: 11
- Operators: State Rail Authority; V/Line various heritage operators

Specifications
- Track gauge: 4 ft 8 1/2 in (1,435 mm) standard gauge, has operated on 5 ft 3 in (1,600 mm)

The New South Wales stainless steel carriage stock is a type of passenger carriage operated by the New South Wales Government Railways from 1961 until 1993.

These carriages were mainly used on interstate trains such as the Southern Aurora, which ran between Sydney and Melbourne, its slower counterpart the Spirit of Progress and the Brisbane Limited. They were also used on the Gold Coast Motorail to Murwillumbah.

With the demise of locomotive-hauled trains, the majority of the carriages passed to the Australian Railway Historical Society, Canberra and New South Wales Rail Transport Museum (now the NSW Rail Museum) who have maintained them in operational condition. The latter infrequently operates them on tours under the Southern Aurora banner. Since November 2020, Vintage Rail Journeys has emerged as the primary operator of ex-Southern Aurora/Brisbane Limited carriages, using a combination of their carriages and carriages hired in from THNSW/LVR.

== Design ==
The carriages used featured fluted sides and consisted of roomette and twinette sleepers, lounge cars and diners, with the Southern Aurora carriages being owned when new jointly by the New South Wales Government Railways and Victorian Railways, and both the Brisbane Express and Gold Coast Motorail carriages being owned by the New South Wales Government Railways.

== Construction ==
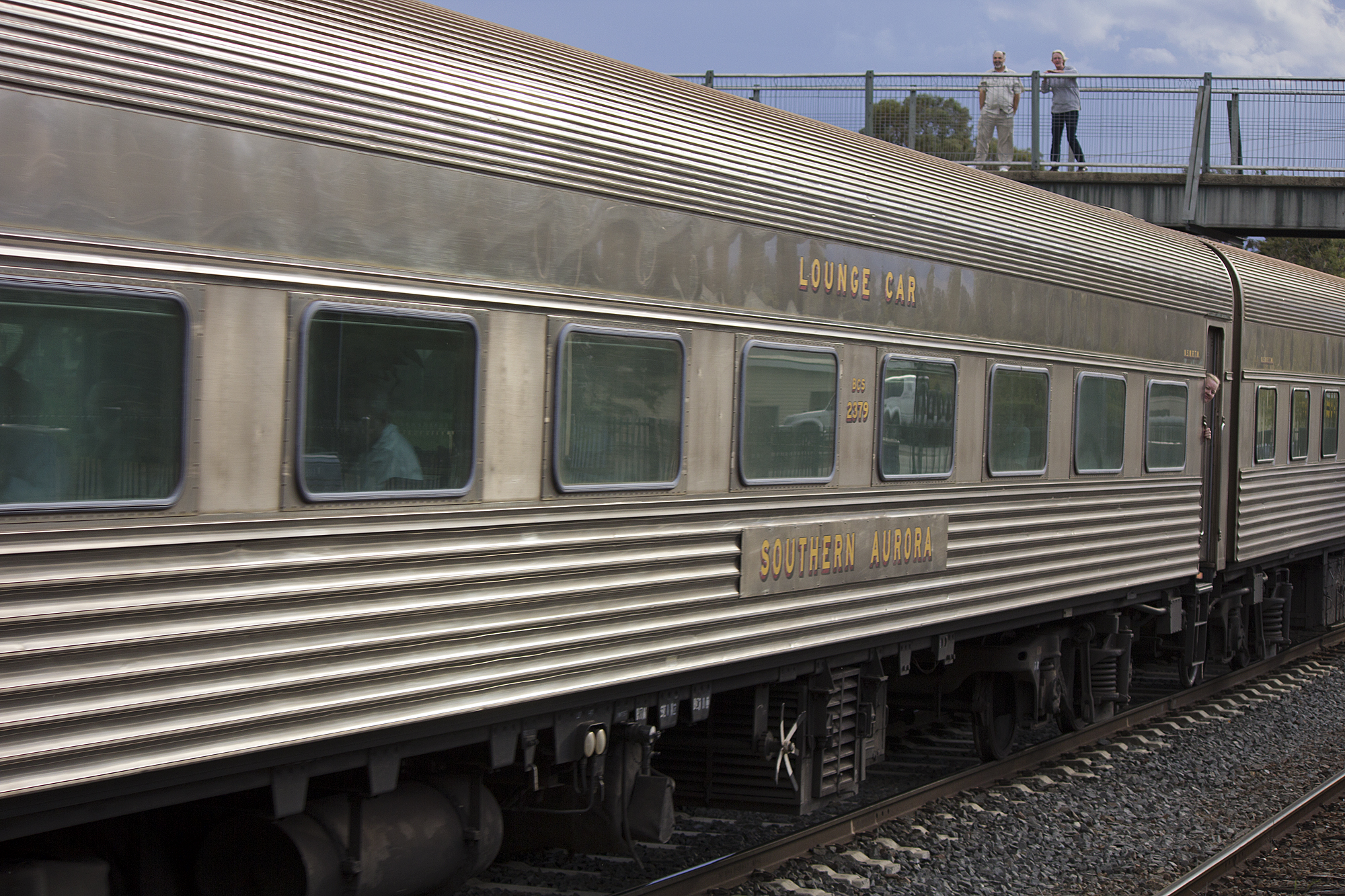
Preserved BCS2379 at Wagga Wagga in April 2012

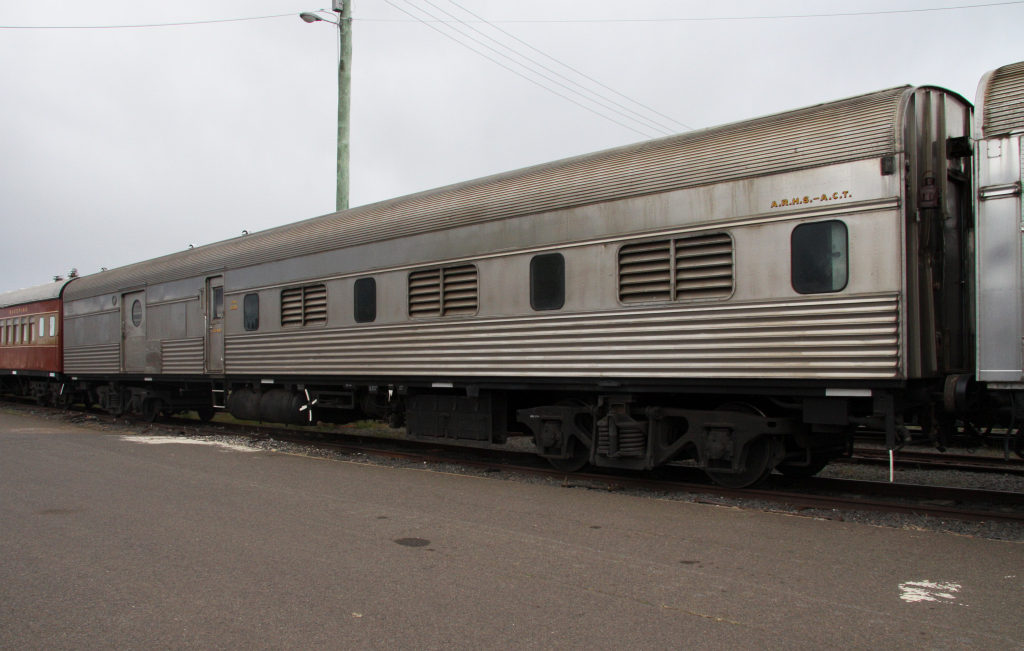
Preserved PHN2381 at the Canberra Railway Museum in October 2009

=== Brisbane Express Cars ===
In late 1954, tenders were called for by the Department of Railways for 24 air conditioned carbon steel bodied cars for the Brisbane Limited similar in construction the HUB and RUB sets. The trains would have been marshalled into two 9-carriage sets, plus one of each type spare. The contract was awarded to Commonwealth Engineering, Granville in August 1955. Commonwealth Engineering had put an option in their tender application for these cars to be constructed from stainless steel instead of the carbon steel specified and they were successful with this option. However, reduced available funds led to extended delays and the renegotiation of the contract and with the contract being changed and by 1959 the cars actually ordered had changed to only 5 LAN roomette sleepers (2323–2327) and 5 NAM twinette sleepers (2328–2332). These cars were built from stainless steel and used design techniques that Commonwealth Engineering had licensed from the Budd Company.

=== Southern Aurora & Spirit of Progress Joint Stock Cars ===
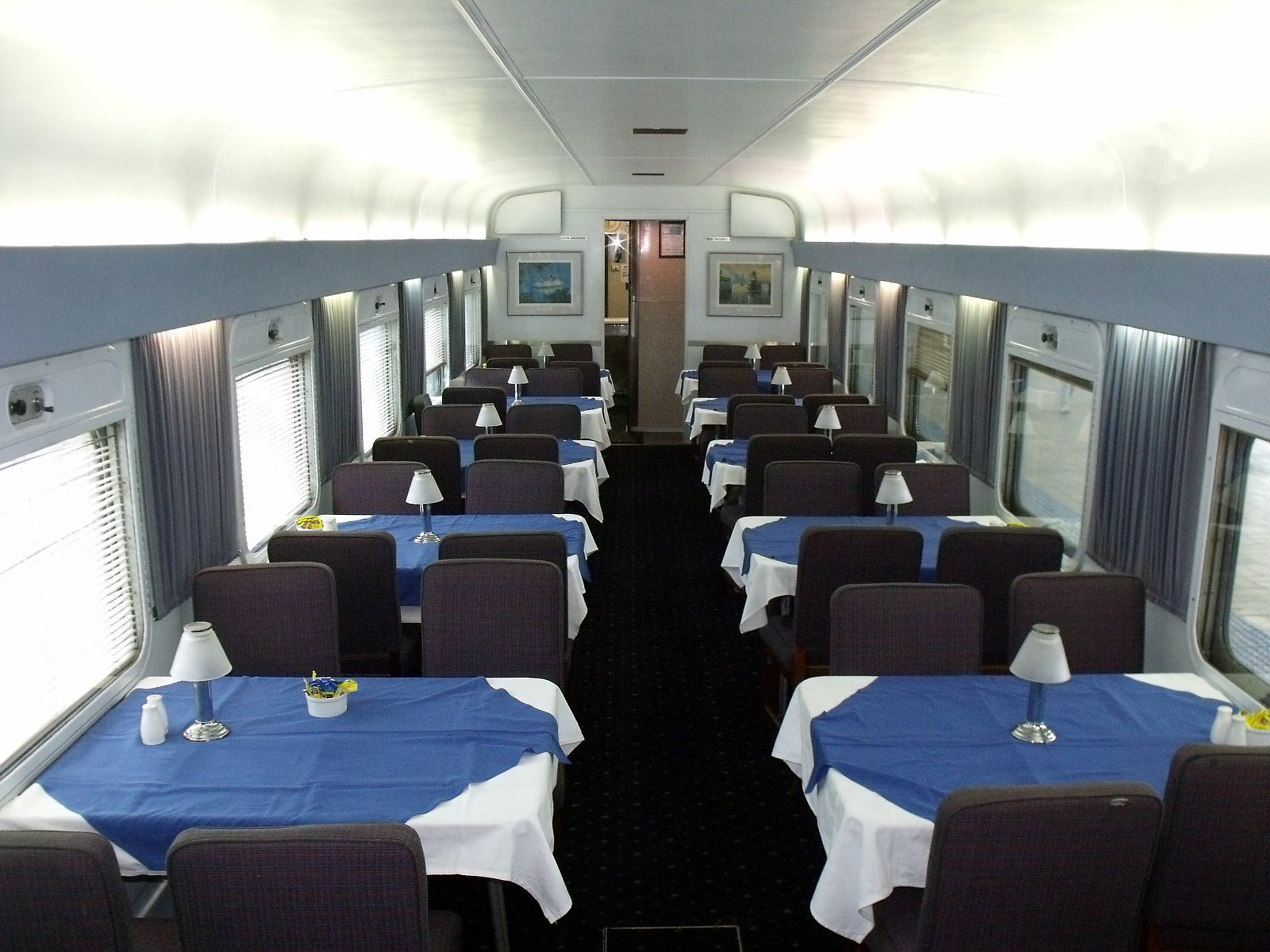
Interior of a Blue Dinning car

A fleet of 34 stainless steel carriages were jointly purchased by the Department of Railways New South Wales and Victorian Railways for the commencement of the Southern Aurora between Sydney and Melbourne in April 1962. The carriages were ordered from Commonwealth Engineering, Granville and the cars as ordered for this service consisted of:

- 9 NAM twinette sleeping cars with a capacity of 20 passengers numbered 2335–2343
- 2 DAM deluxe twinette sleeping cars with a capacity of 18 passengers numbered 2333 & 2334, with 2333 being owned by Victorian Railways and 2334 by NSWGR.
- 3 RMS dining cars numbered 2358–2360
- 3 BCS lounge cars numbered 2355–2357
- 11 LAN roomette sleeping cars with a capacity of 20 passengers numbered 2344–2354
- 3 PHN power/ brake vans numbered 2361–2363
- 3 MHN luggage brake vans numbered 2364–2366

Additional cars to the same design were also ordered for use on the Spirit of Progress, these cars consisted of:

- 3 NAM twinette sleeping cars with a capacity of 20 passengers numbered 2367, 2368 & 2373
- 3 PHN power/ brake vans numbered 2369–2371

Seven were destroyed in the Violet Town rail accident on 7 February 1969 with replacement stock built in 1970/71. The replacement cars of the same design were given new numbers, but used bogies recovered from the crash site.

- 2 NAM, numbered 2374-2375
- 3 LAN, numbered 2376-2378
- 1 BCS, numbered 2379
- 1 PHN, numbered 2381

=== Gold Coast Motorail Cars ===
To provide additional sleeping cars for the Brisbane Limited and Gold Coast Motorail, ten twinette sleeping cars with a capacity of 18 sleeping passengers in nine compartments were ordered by the Public Transport Commission. These cars were coded FAM (2382–2391) and were delivered by Commonwealth Engineering in 1975/76. These had deeper skirts than the earlier built carriages.

=== Power Vans ===
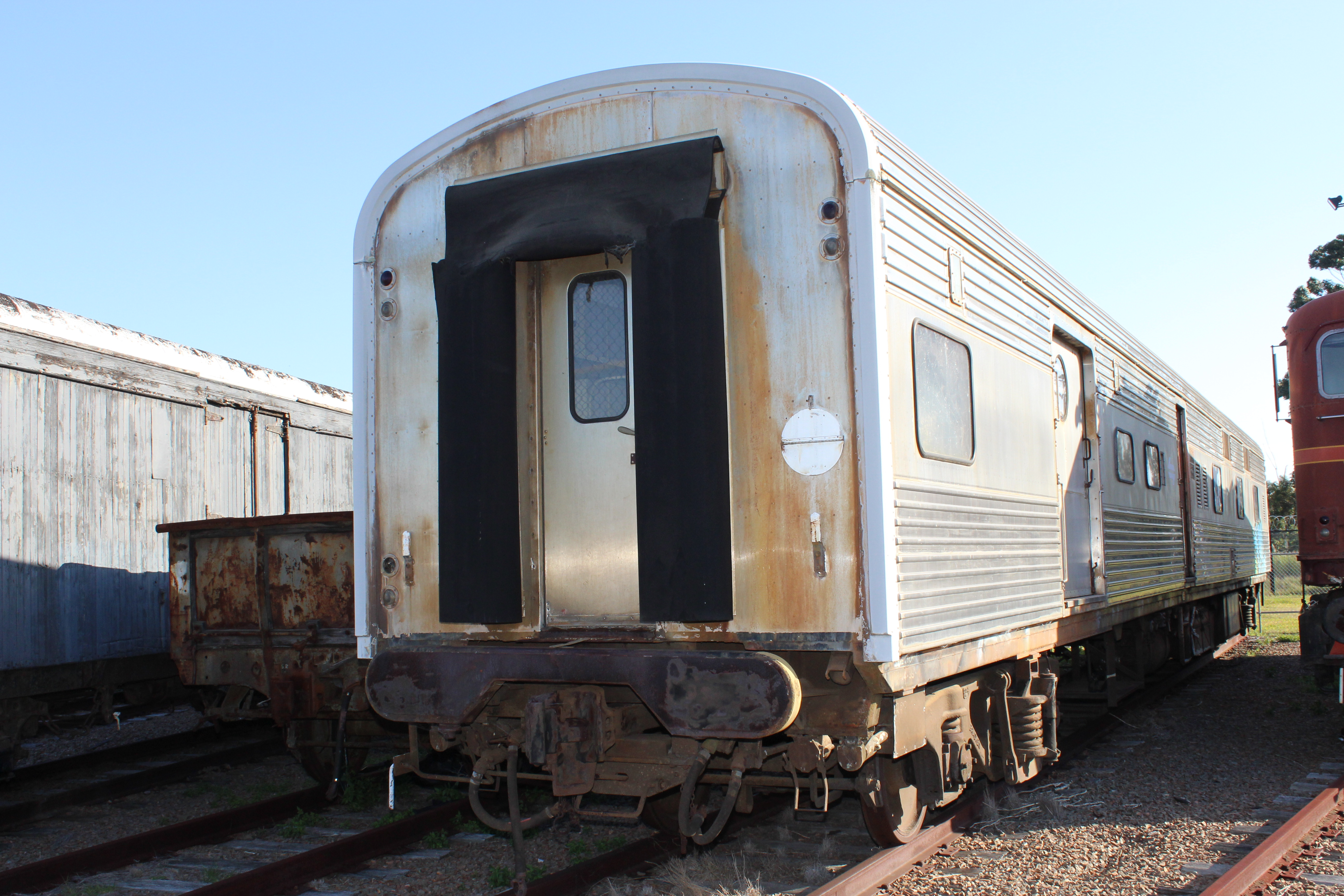
Preserved stainless steel power van PHA2392 at Broadmeadow Locomotive Depot in August 2013

Five power vans with a guard's compartment were delivered during late 1984; they were coded PHA & numbered 2392–2396. These cars were built by A Goninan & Co and differed slightly in exterior finish as Goninans constructed them using design techniques that they had licensed from the Pullman Company as opposed to the Budd techniques used by Commonwealth Engineering. The PHA vans were meant to be replacements for the PHS vans on the longer distance locomotive hauled trains and were fitted with three GM 8V71 125 kW diesel alternator units. These were later replaced by three Cummins engines in PHA 2393 and 2396.

== Operations ==
=== Southern Aurora era 1962–1986 ===
==== Violet Town crash, 1969 ====
Seven were destroyed in the Violet Town rail accident on 7 February 1969 with replacement stock built in 1970/71. The replacement cars of the same design were given new numbers.

=== Withdrawal ===
Some of these cars were withdrawn following the cessation of the North Coast sleepers in February 1990 and the balance when the Sydney/Melbourne Express ceased in November 1993.

=== Heritage operations era 1993–Current ===
Some were placed on RailCorp's heritage register and placed in the custody of the New South Wales Rail Transport Museum. with most other auctioned in August 1994. Queensland Rail purchased six and moved them to Townsville with the aim of refurbishing for use on The Inlander, but the project was cancelled. Canberra Railway Museum had fifteen cars.

=== Repurposing ===
NAM 2332 & NAM 2342 were retained for use as crew carriages with breakdown cranes. NAM 2332 had 4 compartments and the conductors compartment reconfigured as a dining area and kitchen. It is now used by THNSW as a crew carriage. NAM 2342 had the interior of its compartments painted gloss beige whilst in service as a crew car.

Three were converted to track recording cars (known as AK Cars) and have been used across Australia's standard gauge network to record track geometry.

==== V/Line Passenger acquisition of NAM2337 ====
NAM 2337 was purchased by V/Line in 2016 from a private buyer, and the preparations were made to convert it to a power van to be used on the North East Line. In July 2018, the V/Line Board kindly agreed to donate the carriage to the Southern Aurora commemoration project located at Violet Town.

=== Vintage Rail Journeys era 2017–Current ===
In August 2017, Simon Mitchell & Danielle Smith of NSWGR Holdings Pty Ltd purchased 7 carriages at auction from the liquidator of the former ARHS (ACT). Further purchases were subsequently made, such that the organisation owned a total of 17 ex-Southern Aurora Carriages. From November 2017, the initial 7 carriages were moved to Lithgow Railway Workshops, where NAMs 2330, 2341, 2342 & 2374 were restored. LANs 2348, 2372, MHN 2366 & NAM 2335 were subsequently moved to Goulburn Locomotive Roundhouse where restoration commenced in September 2019, concluding in March 2020. RMS 2360 was restored in Goulburn and Thirlmere commencing January 2021, with PHN 2381 following in January 2022. These carriages were housed at the NSW Rail Museum, Thirlmere under a commercial arrangement which concluded on 30 June 2022. NAM 2367 and LANs 2325 & 2344 were moved to Goulburn Locomotive Roundhouse pending restoration. NAM 2367 was the subject of a Regional Job Creation Grant, with restoration commencing in November 2021, and completed by August 2022. On 1 July 2022 the fleet comprising NAM 2330, NAM 2335, NAM 2341, NAM 2342, LAN 2348, RMS 2360, MHN 2366, NAM 2367, NAM 2374 & PHN 2381 were re-located to Goulburn Rail Heritage Centre. On 4 June 2024, Vintage Rail Journeys became part of Journey Beyond's portfolio of iconic Australian train experiences

== Fleet Details ==
Most of the Southern Aurora cars entered service in February, March or April 1962, and except for those destroyed at Violet Town in 1969, they lasted until 1991. They were then stored until August 1994, at which point the final XPT deliveries rendered the Aurora fleet obsolete and they were dispersed among various collections.

Cars were allocated to either the New South Wales Railways or the Victorian Railways for maintenance purposes, and fitted with either 2BS or 2BU bogies respectively. The 2BU bogies were each half a ton heavier than their 2BS counterparts. NSW carriages were maintained at ACDEP while Victorian Railways carriages were transferred to South Dynon, then shifted across to temporary broad gauge bogies and run to Newport Workshops for maintenance, then returned by the same procedure. All PHN and MHN vans were allocated to New South Wales, and were fitted with 2CA bogies which had higher capacity due to 6R axle boxes/130mm axle journals and different secondary spring sets.

=== Dining cars (RMS) ===
Three RMS dining cars were built for the Southern Aurora service. Numbered 2358 through 2360 and entering service in 1962, they used more or less the standard dining car interior with a kitchen at one end and two rows of six four-seater tables either side of a central aisle, for 48 diners at any time. The standard Aurora consist carried up to 200 passengers, so they could nearly all be served across four sittings; additional food facilities were provided in the BCS lounge car for the balance.

The kitchen area was about 28 ft long, plus a small staff compartment and staff toilet facility at the non-dining end of the carriage. External doors were only provided for kitchen access; passengers were expected to access the carriage from other cars, rather than directly. The New South Wales car weighed 43 tons, while the Victorian cars rated 44 tons because of the different bogie designs.

=== Lounge cars (BCS) ===
Three BCS lounge cars were initially provided for the Southern Aurora service. BCS2355 and 2357 were allocated to New South Wales and operated on 2BU bogies, while BCS2356 was allocated to Victoria with 2BU bogies.

The cars had three saloon areas, provided with 27 movable chairs, 5 movable tables and 15 smokers' stands as well as some fixed lounge benches, for a total capacity of 40 passengers. A small kitchen area was also provided, but no toilet facilities. When fitted with 2BU bogies the cars were rated at 40 tons, or with 2BS bogies 39 tons.

=== Roomette cars (LAN) ===
Twenty LAN cars were built from 1959 to 1971. Cars 2323–2327 were the first built, and they were followed by 2344–2354, 2372 and 2376–2378.

The first five were constructed for the Brisbane Limited Express from 1959, and the design was mostly repeated with the eleven Southern Aurora cars from 1961. The only difference was the arrangement of access to the toilet and the location of the doorway for accessing the Conductor's compartment. The modified design was also applied to 2372, built as extra capacity for the Brisbane Limited, and 2376–2378 built to replace cars 2345, 2346 and 2350 destroyed in the 1969 Violet Town crash.

These cars used a central curved hallway with compartments either side, providing a total of 20 single-person berths. In daylight hours the beds would be folded away and replaced with a single lounge chair and small table.

=== Twinette cars (NAM & FAM) ===
A total of 19 NAM twinette sleeping cars were constructed across five batches from 1959 to 1971, numbered 2328–2332, 2335–2343, 2367–2368, 2373 and finally 2374–2375.

The first five were constructed for the Brisbane Limited Express from 1959, and the design was repeated with 9 cars built for the Southern Aurora, three built for the Spirit of Progress, and two built as replacements for cars 2339 and 2343 destroyed in the Violet Town crash of 1969.

Each car had a side hallway, serving an attendant's compartment at pone end plus ten individual compartments. Each of these could seat three passengers in day mode, but were only fitted with two berths (in a bunk arrangement) for night travel. The berths were set up while passengers were in the dining room for dinner, and restored to seating format following breakfast each day. The name "twinette" indicates two people per sleeping compartment.

The ten FAM cars built for the Brisbane Limited and Gold Coast Motorail were based on a more modern design, as applied for the Indian Pacific fleet from 1970. Compartments were a little larger each, and as such the cars only had capacity for 18 passengers in 9 compartments (or 27 sitting).

=== Deluxe Twinette cars (DAM) ===
One deluxe twinnette sleeping carriage was built for each system – Victoria had DAM2333 on 2BU bogies at 42 tons, and New South Wales had DAM2334 on 2BS bogies for 43 tons.

The cars were almost identical to the NAM sleepers, with compartments attached to a side corridor and a small conductor's cabin at one end. The main difference was that the DAM cars' centre two compartments were merged, with the internal wall removed and the whole space allocated to only two sleeping passengers, rather than four. This luxury compartment provided a wider bed at one end, with two armchairs and a full WC and shower, and was placed in the centre of the carriage for maximum comfort.

The cars entered service in February and March 1962, and were both in use until 1991, then stored to August of 1994.

=== Power vans (PHN & PHA) ===
Three PHN power vans were initially built for the Southern Aurora, to provide head end power for air conditioning and on-train lighting as well as an additional 6 tons of luggage capacity. The vehicles were PHN2361, 2632 and 2363. A further three vehicles were built in 1962 for the Spirit of Progress when that was transferred across to standard gauge, and numbered 2369, 2370 and 2371. The six entered service respectively in December 1961, then February and March of 1962, with all three of the Spirit vans entering service in April 1962.

The vans were fitted with three engine mounting points, and weighed 48 tons with two fitted or 51 tons with all three.

In 1984 five further vans were built for the Gold Coast Motorail service to a similar design, but with deeper skirts and other minor finish differences, this was due to these vans being built by A Goninan & Co instead of Commonwealth Engineering who built all the other stainless steel cars. These vans became PHA 2392 to 2396.

=== Luggage vans (MHN) ===
Three MHN vans were built for the Southern Aurora, to provide 24 tons of luggage capacity for the train as well as a guard compartment. The three were identified as MHN 2364 to 2366, and were jointly owned by the Victorian and New South Wales railways but allocated to NSW for maintenance purposes, and fitted with 2CA bogies. Each van weighed 34 tons, with a central 6'6" guards compartment and two 34'3" luggage compartments, one either side.

=== Individual carriage details ===
Columns "Code" through "Withdrawn" are derived from Banger (2012) pp. 180–186, except where marked as another source.

(Banger, Chris (2012). Southern Aurora and the Melbourne Express/Sydney Express 1962–1993. Australian Railway Historical Society (New South Wales division). pp. 180–186. ISBN 978-0-9873408-2-5.)

Key:	In Service	Withdrawn	Preserved	Scrapped	Unknown

Code	Number	Delivered	Entered service	Allocated / Bogie type	Withdrawn	Current owner	Allocation	Notes
LAN	2323	1961-03-xx	1961-05-xx	NSW / 2BS	1994-08-xx	Great Southern Rail (Australia)	Canberra	Formerly Canberra Railway Museum, ACT and before that, Hunter Valley Railway Trust, Rothbury. Sold to NSWGR Holdings Pty Ltd on 3 August 2020. Sold to Great Southern Rail on 4 June 2024.
LAN	2324	1961-03-xx	1961-03-xx	NSW / 2BS	1990-xx-xx	Great Southern Rail (Australia)	Canberra	Formerly owned by the Canberra Railway Museum, ACT. Stripped for parts, likely beyond economic repair. All running gear removed from below the sole bar. Sold at auction 2 August 2017 to NSWGR Holdings Pty Ltd. Sold to Great Southern Rail on 4 June 2024.
LAN	2325	1961-03-xx	1961-03-xx	NSW / 2BS	1990-xx-xx	Great Southern Rail (Australia)	Goulburn	Formerly owned by the Canberra Railway Museum, ACT. As at 4 October 2016, car was listed for sale for $20,000AUD. Previously reported as at Hunter Valley Railway Trust, Rothbury. Sold at auction 2 August 2017 to NSWGR Holdings Pty Ltd. Moved to Goulburn Locomotive Roundhouse in January 2021. Sold to Great Southern Rail on 4 June 2024.
LAN	2326	1961-04-xx	1961-04-xx	NSW / 2CA	1990-xx-xx	Great Southern Rail (Australia)	Canberra	Formerly Canberra Railway Museum, ACT and before that, Hunter Valley Railway Trust, Rothbury.Sold to NSWGR Holdings Pty Ltd on 3 August 2020. Sold to Great Southern Rail on 4 June 2024.
LAN	2327	1961-04-xx	1961-05-xx	NSW / 2BS	1994-08-xx	Private Ownership	Tumut	Interior extensively stripped
NAM	2328	1960-11-xx	1960-12-xx	NSW / 2BS	1989-11-xx	Purchased by M. McEwen, Railway Barracks	Railway Barracks, Goulburn	Stored at Eveleigh Railway Workshops previously.
OAM	2329	1960-11-xx	1960-12-xx	NSW / 2BS	1994-08-xx	Lachlan Valley Railway		Previously Hunter Valley Railway Trust, Rothbury, renovated for the 'Ozback Explorer' who reclassed the vehicle from NAM to OAM.
NAM	2330	1960-12-xx	1960-12-xx	NSW / 2CA	1994-08-xx	Great Southern Rail (Australia)	Chullora	Formerly owned by the Canberra Railway Museum, ACT. Sold at auction 2 August 2017 to NSWGR Holdings Pty Ltd. Restored to operating condition at Lithgow Railway Workshops. Transferred to Goulburn Locomotive Roundhouse on 1 July 2022. Sold to Great Southern Rail on 4 June 2024.
OAP	2331	1960-12-xx	1961-01-xx	NSW / 2BS	1994-08-xx	Great Southern Rail (Australia)	Canberra	Formerly Canberra Railway Museum, ACT and before that, Hunter Valley Railway Trust, Rothbury. Was reclassed to OAP while at Rothbury. Sold on 31 December 2019 to NSWGR Holdings Pty Ltd. Sold to Great Southern Rail on 4 June 2024.
NAM	2332	1961-02-xx	1961-05-xx	NSW / 2BS	1994-08-xx	Transport Heritage NSW	Thirlmere	Allocated to Enfield breakdown train mid-1993, rebuilt as crew car 1995. Currently used as crew car by THNSW.
DAM	2333	1961-10-31	1962-02-27	VIC / 2BU	1994-08-xx	VicTrack Heritage	Capital Region Heritage Rail	Allocated to the Australian Railway Historical Society's museum in Newport, Victoria, and it was transferred to Seymour for storage in mid-July 1994. However, vandals lit the carriage on fire about a year later, and VicTrack Heritage chose to sub-allocate the car to the ARHS (ACT) division in August 2007. A tour train passing Seymour collected the carriage on 15 December that year and transferred it to Canberra. The stainless steel of the vehicle crystallised in the fire and while the car could theoretically be restored, it is not likely in the short term. Following liquidation of the ARHS-ACT's assets the carriage was passed over to Capital Region Heritage Rail (CRHR).
DAM	2334	1961-11-13	1962-03-20	NSW / 2BS	1994-08-xx	Private Owner	Goulburn	Purchased at the carriages auction of 24 August 1994 by the Rothbury Riot Railway, now known as the Hunter Valley Railway Trust. Subsequently sold to a private owner.
NAM	2335	1961-09-18	1965-02-16	NSW / 2BS	1994-08-xx	Great Southern Rail (Australia)	Chullora	Formerly owned by the Canberra Railway Museum, ACT. Refurbished mid-1980s. Purchased at the carriages auction of 24 August 1994 by the ARHS-ACT; re-entered service July 1995. Sold to NSWGR Holdings Pty Ltd. Cosmetically refurbished at Canberra Railway Museum 2018. Restored to operational condition at CFCLA Goulburn Railway Workshops and Goulburn Roundhouse March 2020. Transferred to NSW Rail Museum, Thirlmere on 2 November 2020. Transferred to Goulburn Locomotive Roundhouse on 1 July 2022. Sold to Great Southern Rail on 4 June 2024 and moved to Adelaide on January 25 2026.
NAM	2336	1961-09-29	1962-02-16	VIC / 2BU	1994-08-xx	707 Operations, Newport Workshops		Purchased at the carriages auction of 24 August 1994 by the Rothbury Riot Railway, now known as the Hunter Valley Railway Trust. Leased to Ozback Explorer from September 2003 and reclassed to OAM in 2004. Returned to Hunter Valley Railway Trust. Later purchased by 707 Operations and converted to broad gauge.
NAM	2337	1961-10-09	1962-02-19	NSW / 2BS	1994-08-xx	Violet Town		Purchased at the carriages auction of 24 August 1994 by the Rothbury Riot Railway, now known as the Hunter Valley Railway Trust. Leased to Ozback Explorer from September 2003. Returned to Hunter Valley Railway Trust, then to Lachlan Valley Railway in October 2011. The car was purchased by V/Line Passenger for conversion to a power car at Newport Workshops, planned to be used on the Albury line with their N sets. Conversion was abandoned and the carriage shell has been donated to the Violet Town community for display at a new memorial in 2019.
NAM	2338	1961-10-26	1962-02-15	NSW / 2BS	1994-08-xx	Transport Heritage NSW	Thirlmere	
NAM	2339	1961-11-22	1962-02-27	VIC / 2BU	1970-10-xx	Scrapped, taken off register 1969-10-13		Violet Town rail accident, 7 February 1969
NAM	2340	1961-11-30	1962-02-28	NSW / 2BS	1994-08-xx	Private Owner	Goulburn	Purchased at the carriages auction of 24 August 1994 by the Rothbury Riot Railway, now known as the Hunter Valley Railway Trust. Subsequently sold to a private owner
NAM	2341	1961-12-31	1962-03-01	NSW / 2CA	1994-08-xx	Great Southern Rail (Australia)	Chullora	Formerly owned by the Canberra Railway Museum, ACT. Purchased at the carriages auction of 24 August 1994 by Steamrail Victoria. In May 2003 it was stored near the South Dynon loco depot. Purchased by ARHS (ACT) in 2004, re-entered service in April 2006. Sold at auction 2 August 2017 to NSWGR Holdings Pty Ltd. Restored to operating condition at Lithgow Railway Workshops. Transferred to Goulburn Locomotive Roundhouse on 1 July 2022. Sold to Great Southern Rail on 4 June 2024.
NAM	2342	1962-01-31	1962-03-20	VIC / 2CA	1994-08-xx	Great Southern Rail (Australia)	Chullora	Formerly owned by the Canberra Railway Museum, ACT. Refurbished September 1985. Had been purchased at the carriages auction of 24 August 1994 by S. Sheerif of Taree. Stored outside the Eveleigh Railway Workshops as of June 2010, later purchased by the Canberra Railway Museum, ACT. Sold at auction 2 August 2017 to NSWGR Holdings Pty Ltd. Restored to operating condition at Lithgow Railway Workshops. Transferred to Goulburn Locomotive Roundhouse on 1 July 2022. Sold to Great Southern Rail on 4 June 2024.
NAM	2343	1962-03-12	1962-03-20	VIC / 2BU	1970-10-xx	Scrapped, taken off register 1969-10-13		Violet Town rail accident, 7 February 1969
LAN	2344	1961-06-29	1962-01-30	NSW / 2BS	1994-08-xx	Great Southern Rail (Australia)	Goulburn	Formerly owned by the Canberra Railway Museum, ACT. As at 4 October 2016, car was listed for sale for $20,000AUD. Renumbered LAN2844 from September 1981 to May 1982. Purchased at the carriages auction of 24 August 1994 by J. McCusker. Sold to the Rothbury Riot Railway, now known as the Hunter Valley Railway Trust in 1995. It spent some time in the late 90s on loan to Austrac. Returned to Hunter Valley Railway Trust (Rothbury) March 2000. Sold at auction 2 August 2017 to NSWGR Holdings Pty Ltd. Moved to Goulburn Locomotive Roundhouse in January 2021. Sold to Great Southern Rail on 4 June 2024.
LAN	2345	1961-06-29	1962-01-30	NSW / 2BS	1970-10-xx	Scrapped, taken off register 1969-10-13		Violet Town rail accident, 7 February 1969
LAN	2346	1961-07-14	1962-02-15	NSW / 2BS	1970-10-xx	Scrapped, taken off register 1969-10-13		Violet Town rail accident, 7 February 1969
LAN	2347	1961-07-14	1962-01-30	NSW / 2BS	1994-08-xx	Scrapped at Rothbury, ex Queensland Rail		Renumbered LAN2847 August 1981 to August 1982. Purchased at the carriages auction of 24 August 1994 by Queensland Rail, for use on the Inlander train. Queensland Rail decided to instead refurbish their own fleet, so the carriage was onsold to a private property between Woodstock, Queensland and Calcium, Queensland. Subsequently acquired by the Hunter Valley Railway Trust and scrapped.
LAN	2348	1961-07-24	1962-02-22	NSW / 2BS	1994-08-xx	Great Southern Rail (Australia)	Chullora	Formerly owned by the Canberra Railway Museum, ACT. Refurbished mid-1980s. Purchased at the carriages auction of 24 August 1994 by the ARHS-ACT; re-entered service June 1995. Sold at auction 2 August 2017 to NSWGR Holdings Pty Ltd. Restored to operational condition at CFCLA Goulburn Railway Workshops and Goulburn Roundhouse March 2020. Transferred to NSW Rail Museum, Thirlmere on 2 November 2020. Transferred to Goulburn Locomotive Roundhouse on 1 July 2022. Sold to Great Southern Rail on 4 June 2024.
LAN	2349	1961-07-24	1962-02-22	VIC / 2BU	1994-08-xx	Scrapped at Rothbury, ex Queensland Rail		Purchased at the carriages auction of 24 August 1994 by Queensland Rail, for use on the Inlander train. Queensland Rail decided to instead refurbish their own fleet, so the carriage was onsold to a private property between Woodstock, Queensland and Calcium, Queensland. Subsequently acquired by the Hunter Valley Railway Trust and scrapped.
LAN	2350	1961-07-31	1962-02-22	VIC / 2BU	1970-10-xx	Scrapped, taken off register 1969-10-13		Violet Town rail accident, 7 February 1969. First stainless steel carriage to be scrapped in Australia.
LAN	2351	1961-08-07	1962-02-27	VIC / 2BU	1994-07-xx	VicTrack Heritage	Capital Region Heritage Rail	Refurbished in October 1986. Allocated to the Australian Railway Historical Society's museum in Newport, Victoria, and it was transferred to Seymour for storage in mid-July 1994 and stored on one of the turntable tracks. Allocated by VicTrack Heritage to the ARHS (ACT) division in August 2007. A tour train passing Seymour collected the carriage on 15 December that year and transferred it to Canberra. Following liquidation of the ARHS-ACT's assets the carriage was passed over to Capital Region Heritage Rail (CRHR).
LAN	2352	1961-08-14	1962-03-20	VIC / 2BU	1994-08-xx	Transport Heritage NSW	707 Operations, Newport Workshops	Refurbished in March 1987. Custody awarded to 707 Operations, transferred from Thirlmere to Melbourne March 2020 and converted to broad gauge May 2020
LAN	2353	1961-08-20	1962-04-19	NSW / 2BS	1994-08-xx	Transport Heritage NSW	Thirlmere	Refurbished in June 1987. Purchased at the carriages auction of 24 August 1994 by J. McCusker. Sold to the Rothbury Riot Railway, now known as the Hunter Valley Railway Trust in 1995. It spent some time in the late 90s on loan to Austrac. Returned to Hunter Valley Railway Trust March 2000. Sold to Transport Heritage NSW in 2015 who moved it to Broadmeadow Loco Depot for storage. Moved to Thirlmere and re-activated.
LAN	2354	1961-09-05	1962-03-20	VIC / 2BU	1994-08-xx	707 Operations	Newport Workshops	Refurbished in October 1987. Purchased at the carriages auction of 24 August 1994 by Steamrail Victoria. Fitted with Harris motor car bogies for operation on the broad gauge system in November–December 1997. Sold to a private individual on behalf of 707 Operations in mid-2018 and converted to broad gauge
BCS	2355	1961-11-30	1962-02-27	NSW / 2BS	1970-10-xx	Scrapped 1969-06-xx, taken off register 1969-10-13		Violet Town rail accident, 7 February 1969
BCS	2356	1962-02-28	1962-03-06	VIC / 2BU	1994-08-xx	Transport Heritage NSW	Thirlmere	Refurbished in July 1984.
BCS	2357	1962-03-14	1962-04-18	NSW / 2BS	1994-08-xx	Transport Heritage NSW	Thirlmere	Temporarily renumbered to BCS2857 from October 1981 to April 1982.
RMS	2358	1961-12-31	1962-02-27	NSW / 2BS	1994-08-xx	Transport Heritage NSW	Thirlmere	In the 1969 Violet Town collision the car received some damage, but it successfully rebuilt by Commonwealth Engineering later that year.
RMS	2359	1962-03-05	1962-03-09	VIC / 2BU	1994-08-xx	Transport Heritage NSW	Thirlmere	The kitchen caught fire in 1983 near Goulburn and the car was detached, but the fire had burnt out before the fire brigade arrived. The car was internally refurbished in July 1985.
RMS	2360	1962-03-30	1962-04-18	VIC / 2BU	1993-11-xx	Great Southern Rail (Australia)	Adelaide (Journey Beyond)	The car was internally refurbished in 1984, but partially damaged by fire in 1990. The car was transferred to Newport for assessment but the damage was thought to be too great, and so the vehicle was stored at Dynon from 1991. In November 1993 it was purchased by West Coast Railway, then transferred to Ballarat East via Geelong. The car was restored and re-entered service on 20 November 1998, as the last Aurora carriage to be overhauled in Victoria. As the 2BU bogies were only suited for standard gauge, new bogies were needed for broad gauge operation; former Harris motor carriage bogies were utilised. The car was used semi-regularly, particularly for excursion trains, until the end of West Coast Railway when it was used on the 31 August 2004 farewell trip to Warrnambool. It was then purchased by the Australian Railway Historical Society (Canberra) division, fitted with 2CA bogies and transferred in November 2004. Following liquidation of the ARHS-ACT's assets the carriage was passed over to ACT Heritage Rail Holdings (ACT HRH). Sold on 30 September 2019 to NSWGR Holdings Pty Ltd, on 2BU bogies. Moved to Goulburn Locomotive Roundhouse in January 2021 for cosmetic restoration, then transferred to the NSW Rail Museum, Thirlmere for further engineering works. Re-commenced service in March 2021. Transferred to Goulburn Locomotive Roundhouse on 1 July 2022. Sold to Great Southern Rail on 4 June 2024 and moved to Adelaide January 25 2026.
PHN	2361	1961-11-22	1961-12-01	NSW / 2CA	1994-08-xx	Privately owned	Queensland	In December 1961, PHN2361 was transferred across to broad gauge, to provide head end power to the Spirit of Progress carriages that had already been converted to head end power in lieu of axle-mounted generators. At the time, the vehicle only had two 165kW diesel alternators fitted, with the third was fitted in May 1962. In 1980 the guard's compartment was air conditioned, and crew showers were fitted. At the end of 1985 all three alternators were removed and replaced with 125 kW alternator units. The vehicle was sold in the August 1994 auction to a J. Attard, then onsold to the Hunter Valley Railway Trust in 1995. It spent some time in the late 90s on loan to Austrac. Onsold to private ownership.
PHN	2362	1961-12-31	1962-02-27	NSW / 2CA		Transport Heritage NSW	Newport Workshops	PHN2362 took significant damage in September 1969 when the northbund Spirit of Progress derailed between Bowral and Mittagong. It was repaired at Eveleigh workshops and re-entered service in October 1970. Circa 1981 it underwent the same modifications as PHN2361, with the guard compartment air conditioned and staff showers fitted. Around the same time it was renumbered from 2362 to 2862, but its original identity was restored in June 1982. Five years later the alternators were replaced, with two Cummins 200kW units installed and the electrical equipment swapped out for a Marathon system. From 1999 to 2003 it was loaned to Great Southern Railway, then returned to the New South Wales State Rail Authority and stored at Eveleigh. On 17 May 2024 it was transferred to 707 Operations
PHN	2363	1962-02-28	1962-03-06	NSW / 2CA		Transport Heritage NSW	Thirlmere	PHN2363 was fitted with its air conditioned guard's compartment and shower in 1981, and temporarily renumbered 2383. 1989 saw the alternator sets replaced with Cummins units and Marathon electricals. The car was used to provide power for the RailCorp breakdown train, until 2007 when the crane was damaged. As of 2010 the crane had not been repaired, so the train was stored at Flemington Car Sheds.
MHN	2364	1961-09-14	1962-02-15	NSW / 2CA		Transport Heritage NSW	Thirlmere	MHN2364 was used in the XPT demonstration train in 1981 in a custom livery, as no XPT guards van carriages had yet been constructed. An end door was fitted at one end in 1991, and in 1993 it was transferred to the NSW Freight Rail division for use on the breakdown train. When that train's crane was damaged in 2007 the car was stored at Flemington Car Sheds.
MHN	2365	1961-09-29	1962-03-18	NSW / 2CA		Transport Heritage NSW	Chullora Heritage Hub	MHN2365 also had a single end door fitted in 1991, and was allocated to the breakdown train in 1993. From 1999 to 2003 it was loaned to Great Southern Railway, and after being returned it was allocated to the NSW RTM.
MHN	2366	1962-03-30	1962-05-09	NSW / 2CA		Great Southern Rail (Australia)	Chullora	Formerly owned by the Canberra Railway Museum, ACT. MHN2366 was temporarily renumbered 2866, from August 1981 to June 1983. in September of 1990 it was fitted with an end door and recoded AHO as an inspection car. In May 1991 the car was transferred from the Joint Stock register to NSW exclusively; and in July 1995 it was further passed to Freight Corp. From 2001 it was loaned by Rail Services Australia to ARHS (ACT); in 2007 it was recoded back to MHN, and used as a staff and storage vehicle on tours. Sold at auction 2 August 2017 to NSWGR Holdings Pty Ltd. Restored to operational condition at CFCLA Goulburn Railway Workshops and Goulburn Roundhouse March 2020. Transferred to NSW Rail Museum, Thirlmere on 2 November 2020. Transferred to Goulburn Locomotive Roundhouse on 1 July 2022. Sold to Great Southern Rail on 4 June 2024.
NAM	2367	1962-05-10	1962-05-21	VIC / 2BU	1994-08-xx	Great Southern Rail (Australia)	Chullora	Formerly owned by the Hunter Valley Railway Trust, Rothbury; purchased at the carriages auction of 24 August 1994 by the Rothbury Riot Railway, now known as the Hunter Valley Railway Trust. Later sold to P. Anderson, who on-sold it to NSWGR Holdings Pty Ltd. Moved to Goulburn Locomotive Roundhouse in January 2021 for restoration, which concluded in August 2022. Sold to Great Southern Rail on 4 June 2024.
NAM	2368	1962-05-24	1962-06-05	VIC / 2BU	1994-08-xx	Unknown. Purchased 24 August 1994 by P. Hickey.		
PHN	2369	1962-03-26	1962-04-04	NSW / 2CA	1994-08-xx	Great Southern Rail (Australia)	Keswick, South Australia	PHN2369 entered service on the Brisbane Limited Express, then about a week later it was transferred to Melbourne for the first Spirit of Progress run to Sydney. The alternators and electricals were rteplaced in 1989, but the guard comaprtment was not air conditioned nor were showering facilities fitted. The car was privately purchased in 1994, and later passed to the Northern Rivers Railroad based in Casino NSW. NRR applied a blue vinyl sticker along the window line. The car was sold to Great Southern Rail in 2005, then re-entered service with them in late 2006.
PHN	2370	1962-04-04	1962-04-09	NSW / 2CA	1970-10-xx	Scrapped, taken off register 1969-10-13		Violet Town rail accident, 7 February 1969
PHN	2371	1962-04-13	1962-04-19	NSW / 2CA	1992-07-xx			PHN2371 was stored from 1990 and formally withdrawn in 1992, but not offered for sale in 1994.
LAN	2372	1963-06-19	1963-11-06	NSW / 2BS	1994-08-xx	Great Southern Rail (Australia)	Chullora	Formerly owned by the Canberra Railway Museum, ACT. Purchased at the carriages auction of 24 August 1994 by Steamrail Victoria. Sold to ARHS ACT in 1998; overhauled and re-entered service in 1999. Sold at auction 2 August 2017 to NSWGR Holdings Pty Ltd. Restored to operational condition at CFCLA Goulburn Railway Workshops and Goulburn Roundhouse March 2020. Transferred to NSW Rail Museum, Thirlmere on 2 November 2020. Transferred to Goulburn Locomotive Roundhouse on 1 July 2022. Sold to Great Southern Rail on 4 June 2024.
NAM	2373	1963-05-30	1963-10-18	NSW / 2BS	1994-08-xx	Transport Heritage NSW	Newport Workshops	Transferred to 707 Operations on 17 May 2024.
NAM	2374	1970-12-16	1971-01-04	VIC / 2BU	1994-08-xx	Great Southern Rail (Australia)	Chullora	Formerly owned by the Canberra Railway Museum, ACT. Refurbished in April 1986. Was last used on northbound Sydney Express 27 January 1992. Purchased at the carriages auction of 24 August 1994 by the ARHS-ACT. Sold at auction 2 August 2017 to NSWGR Holdings Pty Ltd. Restored to operating condition at Lithgow Railway Workshops. Transferred to Goulburn Locomotive Roundhouse on 1 July 2022. Sold to Great Southern Rail on 4 June 2024.
NAM	2375	1971-04-06	1971-06-10	VIC / 2BU	1994-08-xx	Transport Heritage NSW	Thirlmere	Refurbished in July 1986.
LAN	2376	1970-12-16	1971-01-21	VIC / 2BU	1994-08-xx	Dorrigo Steam Railway & Museum	Dorrigo	Purchased at the carriages auction of 24 August 1994 by the Dorrigo Steam & Railway Museum, left Sydney 15 September 1994.
LAN	2377	1970-11-30	1970-12-18	NSW / 2BS	1994-08-xx	Transport Heritage NSW	Thirlmere	Temporarily renumbered LAN2877 from September 1981 to March 1982.
OAN	2378	1971-03-22	1971-04-28	NSW / 2BS	1994-08-xx	Lachlan Valley Railway	Orange	Purchased at the carriages auction of 24 August 1994 by S. Sheerif of Taree. Sold to Ozback Explorer January 2003, reclassed to OAN2378 in May 2004. Sold to Hunter Valley Railway Trust, then to Lachlan Valley Railway in October 2011 but not moved. Moved to Orange June 2023.
BCS	2379	1970-11-18	1970-12-22	NSW / 2BS	1994-08-xx	Transport Heritage NSW	Thirlmere	Used by 3801 Limited for a short period before being allocated to the RTM in 2007.
NAM	2380	1963-07-xx	1963-07-xx	NSW / 2BS	1994-08-xx	707 Operations	Newport Workshops	Formerly Canberra Railway Museum, ACT and before that, Hunter Valley Railway Trust, Rothbury (then the Rothbury Riot Railway) purchased the vehicle at the carriages auction of 24 August 1994.
PHN	2381	1970-10-30	1970-12-16	NSW / 2CA	1990-xx-xx	Great Southern Rail (Australia)	Adelaide (Journey Beyond)	PHN2381 was withdrawn in 1990 and stored at Eveleigh, then purchased by the ARHS (ACT) in 1999. Following liquidation of the ARHS-ACT's assets the carriage was passed over to Capital Region Heritage Rail (CRHR). Sold to NSWGR Holdings Pty Ltd on 30 September 2019. Moved to Goulburn Locomotive Roundhouse in January 2021. Sold to Great Southern Rail on 4 June 2024. Moved to Adelaide on the 25th Jan 2026.
AK	2382		1975-08-xx	NSW / 2CP		Sydney Trains and Australian Rail Track Corporation Joint Venture		Temporarily renumbered 2882. Was converted to track recording carriage ex FAM2382 in June 1995, and fitted with an observation end.
AK	2383		1975-08-xx	NSW / 2CP		Sydney Trains and Australian Rail Track Corporation Joint Venture		Was converted to track recording carriage ex FAM2383 in June 1995, and fitted with an observation end and, more recently, a pantograph.
AK	2384		1975-10-xx	NSW / 2CP		Sydney Trains and Australian Rail Track Corporation Joint Venture		Temporarily renumbered 2884. Ex FAM2384, renumbered but unaltered as accommodation on the track recording train.
FAM	2385		1975-10-xx	NSW / 2CP	1994-08-xx	Scrapped at Rothbury, ex Queensland Rail		Temporarily renumbered 2885. Purchased at the carriages auction of 24 August 1994 by Queensland Rail, for use on the Inlander train. Queensland Rail decided to instead refurbish their own fleet, so the carriage was onsold to a private property between Woodstock, Queensland and Calcium, Queensland. Subsequently acquired by the Hunter Valley Railway Trust and scrapped.
FAM	2386		1975-11-xx	NSW / 2CP		Swanbank		Converted for breakdown train use 1992/1993, by replacing two compartments with a kitchen and dining room, and fitting a diesel alternator under the floor. Allocated to the Broadmeadow breakdown train.
FAM	2387		1975-11-xx	NSW / 2CP	1994-08-xx	Scrapped at Rothbury, ex Queensland Rail		Purchased at the carriages auction of 24 August 1994 by Queensland Rail, for use on the Inlander train. Queensland Rail decided to instead refurbish their own fleet, so the carriage was onsold to a private property between Woodstock, Queensland and Calcium, Queensland. Subsequently acquired by the Hunter Valley Railway Trust and scrapped.
FAM	2388		1975-12-xx	NSW / 2CP	1994-08-xx	Privately owned		Temporarily renumbered 2885. Purchased at the carriages auction of 24 August 1994 by Queensland Rail, for use on the Inlander train. Queensland Rail decided to instead refurbish their own fleet, so the carriage was onsold to a private property between Woodstock, Queensland and Calcium, Queensland.
FAM	2389		1976-01-xx	NSW / 2CP		Pacific National		Temporarily renumbered 2889. Converted for breakdown train use 1992/1993, by replacing two compartments with a kitchen and dining room, and fitting a diesel alternator under the floor. Allocated to the Lithgow breakdown train. Converted to a crewcar in 2005 by Bluebird Rail Islington SA, Involved in derailment at Rawlinna WA 21 April 2016
FAM	2390		1976-02-xx	NSW /		Privately owned	Currowan, New South Wales	Converted into a residence.
FAM	2391		1976-04-xx	NSW /	1994-08-xx	Transport Heritage NSW	Thirlmere	
PHA	2392		1984-10-xx	NSW /		Privately Owned		Unserviceable. Was part of the State collection disposed of early 2024.
PHA	2393		1984-11-xx	NSW /		Journey Beyond	Adelaide	Put up for disposal by State Rail in 2000. Following liquidation of the ARHS-ACT's assets the carriage was passed over to Capital Region Heritage Rail (CRHR). Moved to Adelaide in January 2026.
PHA	2394		1984-11-xx	NSW /		Great Southern Rail (Australia)	Canberra	Unserviceable
PHA	2395		1984-11-xx	NSW /		Transport Heritage NSW	Redfern Carriageworks, Eveleigh	Put up for disposal by State Rail in 2000. Unserviceable
PHA	2396		1984-12-xx	NSW /		Transport Heritage NSW	Large Erecting Shop, Eveleigh	Unserviceable

== See also ==
- Southern Aurora
- Intercapital Daylight
- Spirit of Progress
- Sydney/Melbourne Express
- Brisbane Limited
