= Sydney Mail =

Sydney Mail may refer to:

- Sydney Mail (train service), a train service that existed between 1888 and 1972 going from Brisbane to Wallangarra, where passengers would transfer at Wallangarra for the Brisbane Limited.
- The Sydney Mail, an Australian magazine that was published weekly in Sydney between 1860 and 1938.
