= Beveridge =

Beveridge is a Scottish surname. Notable people with the surname include:

- Ada Beveridge (1875–1964), Australian leader of the Country Women's Association
- Albert Beveridge (1862–1927), American historian and politician
- Bill Beveridge (1909–1995), Canadian ice-hockey goaltender
- Bob Beveridge (1909–1998), English cricketer
- Christine Beveridge, Australian plant physiologist
- Corie Beveridge, Canadian female curler, 1996 World and Canadian champion
- Crawford Beveridge (born 1947), Scottish businessman, Sun Microsystems
- Daeida Wilcox Beveridge (1861–1914), co-developer of Hollywood, California
- Erskine Beveridge (1851–1920), Scottish textile manufacturer, historian and antiquary
- George D. Beveridge (1922–1987), American journalist
- Gordon Beveridge (1933–1999), Scottish academic and university administrator
- Graeme Beveridge (born 1976), Scottish rugby union player
- Henry Beveridge (1837–1929), British civil servant and orientalist
- James Beveridge (1917–1993), Canadian filmmaker, author and educator
- Jane Marsh Beveridge (1915–1998), Canadian filmmaker, educator and sculptor
- John Beveridge (mayor) (1848–1916), New South Wales businessman and Alderman
- John Lourie Beveridge (1824–1910), American politician, Governor of Illinois 1873–1877
- Judith Beveridge (born 1956), Australian poet, editor and academic
- Luke Beveridge (born 1970), Australian rules footballer and coach
- Rabbie Beveridge (1877–1901), Scottish footballer
- Rob Beveridge (born 1970), Australian basketball coach
- William Beveridge (bishop) (1637–1708), English Bishop of St Asaph
- William Beveridge (footballer) (1858–1941), Scottish footballer and athlete
- William Beveridge (1879–1963), British economist and social reformer
- William Ian Beardmore Beveridge (1908–2006), Australian animal pathologist

== First name ==
- Beveridge C. Dunlop (1879–1961), New York politician
- Beveridge Webster (1908–1999), American pianist and educator

== See also ==
- Beveridge, Victoria, town in Victoria, Australia
- Beveridge, California, unincorporated community in California, United States
- Beveridge curve
- Beveridge Locks, canal locks connecting the Tay River to the Rideau Canal Waterway in Drummond/North Elmsley, Ontario, Canada
- Beveridge Reef
- Beveridge Report
