= Victorian Railways S class =

Class of Australian 4-6-2 locomotives

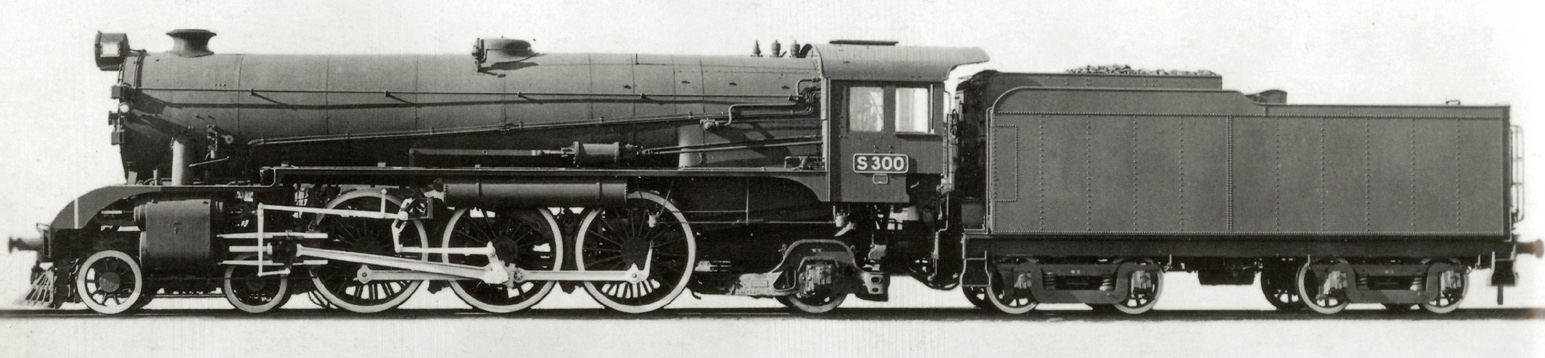
- Builder's photo of S300, 1928
Type and origin
- Power type: Steam
- Builder: Newport Workshops
- Build date: 1928
- Total produced: 4
Specifications
- Configuration
  - Whyte: 4-6-2
- Gauge: 1,600 mm (5 ft 3 in)
- Driver dia.: 72 15/16 in (1,853 mm)
- Length: 1928: 78 ft 6 3/4 in (23.95 m); 1951: 85 ft 6 in (26.06 m)
- Axle load: 23 LT 10 cwt (23.9 t)
- Adhesive weight: 70 LT 10 cwt (71.6 t)
- Loco weight: 1928: 112 LT 5 cwt (114.05 t); 1951: 114 LT 10 c (116.3 t)
- Tender weight: 1928: 82 LT 8 cwt (83.7 t); 1951: 109 LT 7 c (111.10 t)
- Total weight: 1928: 194 LT 13 cwt (197.77 t); 1951: 223 LT 17 cwt (227.44 t)
- Fuel type: Coal; Oil (after 1951)
- Fuel capacity: 1928: 9 long tons (9 t); 1951: 2,000 imp gal (9,092 L; 2,402 US gal)
- Water cap.: 1928: 8,600 imp gal (39,096 L; 10,328 US gal); 1951: 12,600 imp gal (57,281 L; 15,132 US gal) water
- Firebox
  - Grate area: 50 ft^{2} (4.6 m^{2})
- Boiler pressure: 200 psi (1.38 MPa)
- Heating surface: 1928: 3,691 ft^{2} (342.9 m^{2}); 1951: 3,723 ft^{2} (345.9 m^{2})
- Superheater
  - Heating area: 570 ft^{2} (53.0 m^{2})
- Cylinders: 3
- Cylinder size: 20.5 in × 28 in (521 mm × 711 mm)
- Valve gear: Walschaerts/Gresley
- Valve type: 10-inch (254 mm) piston valves
- Valve travel: 6 inches (152 mm)
- Valve lap: 1 1/4 inches (32 mm); exhaust lap: −3/16 inch (−4.8 mm)
- Valve lead: 5/16 inch (7.9 mm)
Performance figures
- Power output: at drawbar: 2,300 horsepower (1,720 kW) at 45 miles per hour (72 km/h)
- Tractive effort: 41,670 lbf (185.4 kN) at 85% boiler pressure
Career
- Operators: Victorian Railways
- Numbers: S300-S303
- Delivered: 1928-1930
- Disposition: All scrapped

The Victorian Railways S class was a class of 4-6-2 express passenger steam locomotive operated by the Victorian Railways (VR) in Australia between 1928 and 1954. Built when the VR was at its zenith and assigned to haul the broad gauge-leg of its Melbourne to Sydney interstate express passenger services, the S class remained the VR's most prestigious locomotive class until the advent of diesel electric locomotives in the early 1950s.

They were the first Pacific-type locomotives on the VR, as well as its first 3-cylinder locomotive type. Renowned for their power and speed, in the ten years that followed their introduction the running time of the premier Sydney express service they operated was progressively reduced by one and a half hours. These service improvements culminated in 1937 with the replacement of the Sydney Limited with the Art Deco streamliner Spirit of Progress, and the S class locomotives were fitted with streamlined casings to match the new train set. They were also equipped with long-range tenders to enable the entire 190 1/2-mile (306.6 km) journey to be run non-stop at a speed that remained for the next 20 years Australia's fastest train service.

Although only four S class locomotives were built, they were highly utilised. They ran up annual mileages double that of other classes of locomotives on the VR and by 1954 had run a combined total of approximately 5,700,000 miles (9,200,000 km). However their size and heavy axle load made them unsuitable for regular service on any other lines than the North Eastern line, and so within six months of the introduction of the new B class diesel locomotives on the Spirit of Progress roster in April 1954 the S class had all been withdrawn and scrapped. Their scrapping was a catalyst for the rail preservation movement in Victoria to lobby for the preservation of remaining examples of other VR steam locomotives, resulting in the establishment in 1962 of the Australian Railway Historical Society Museum in Williamstown North.

== History ==
The S class locomotives were built to speed up principal express services, and to eliminate double-heading of services by their A2 class 4-6-0 predecessors. Although designed for normal operation at 70 miles per hour (112.7 km/h), they were credited as being capable of 90 miles per hour (144.8 km/h).

They were the final design of the Victorian Railways' Chief Mechanical Engineer Alfred E Smith, who had been responsible for the highly successful K class 2-8-0 and N class 2-8-2 designs, and was closely involved with the earlier A2 class 4-6-0, C class 2-8-0, and Dd class 4-6-0 designs.

The S class was VR's first three-cylinder locomotive, and Smith's design was influenced by Nigel Gresley's Great Northern Railway A1 class 4-6-2 with its Gresley conjugated valve gear. The S class also displayed some American design influence in its use of bar frames rather than plate frames and the provision of a delta trailing truck.

Built at the VR's Newport Workshops, the S class locomotives were, at the time of construction of the first three, the largest locomotives to have been built in Australia, and had the largest boilers to have been constructed in the southern hemisphere. Another notable design innovation, the incorporation of all three cylinders and the smokebox saddle into a single 5 1/2-long-ton (5.6 t) casting, was the first of its type in the southern hemisphere and one of the largest single castings undertaken in Australia up to that time. That was only possible because a "set" was placed in the axle of the leading driving wheels, thus allowing all three cylinders to be in the same horizontal plane. That had the added advantage of avoiding many of the middle cylinder problems that beset Gresley's Pacifics.

The S class spent its entire revenue service life on the main North East line because its axle load was too high for regular service on any other Victorian Railways line. Although Annual Reports show the railways planned to upgrade the main Western line and build further S class locomotives to haul The Overland services between Ararat and Serviceton, exigencies imposed by the Great Depression and World War II meant the planned upgrade of that service never eventuated.

Although a numerically small class, limited to a single line, the S class was utilised extensively. By November 1929, the three locomotives then in service were reported to be doing work that would have taxed the capacity of five A2 class locomotives, yet their £53,000 ($106,000) capital cost was £2,000 ($4,000) cheaper than the five A2s, and they were further saving an estimated £3,000 ($6,000) per year in comparative operating costs. By 1936, they were averaging 56,200 miles (90,400 km) per year, with S303 having set a record annual mileage for Victorian Railways locomotives, travelling 79,455 miles (127,870 km) in one year. They were also noted for running 82,000 miles (132,000 km) between major overhauls, compared to an average 65,000 miles (105,000 km) for other locomotive classes in the VR fleet. By the time of their withdrawal from service, all had travelled well in excess of a million miles, with S302 the most travelled at 1,446,468 miles (2,327,865 km) over its 25-year, 2 month service life, averaging 4,773 miles (7,679 km) per month. S303 travelled 1,434,664 miles (2,308,868 km) in its service life of just 23 years, 6 months, averaging over 5,087 miles (8,187 km) per month.

=== Regular service: 1928–1937 ===
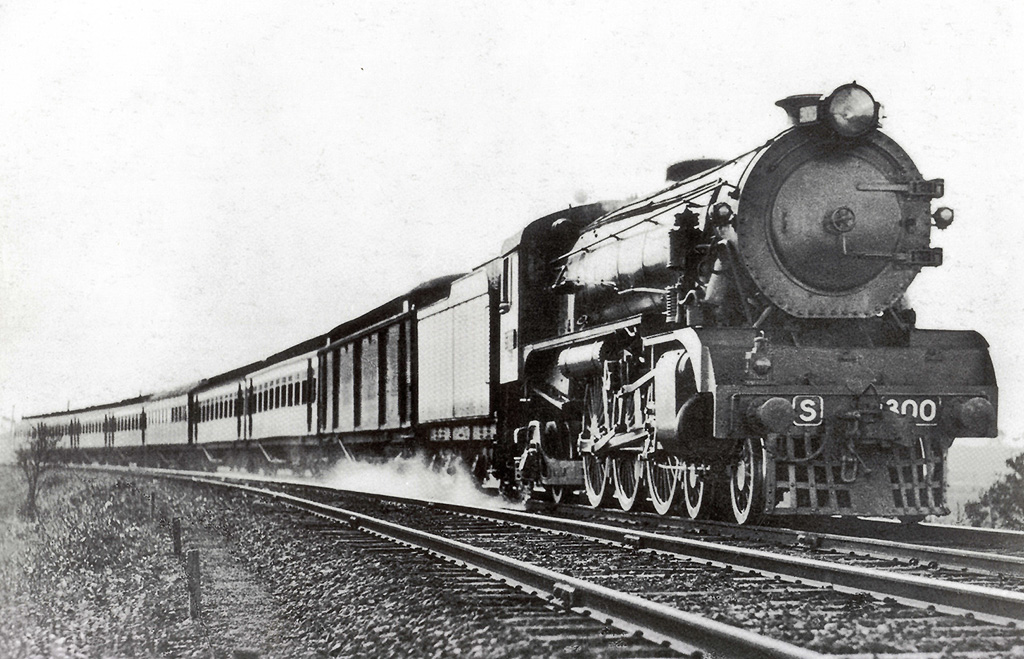
S300 in original condition leads the Sydney Limited between Seymour and Melbourne circa 1928

On 19 March 1928, S300 hauled its first revenue passenger service between Seymour and Melbourne. After ten weeks of trials, it was regularly rostered on the key North East line Sydney Limited and Albury Express services unassisted, hauling trains comprising up to ten E type carriages plus luggage van over the 1 in 50 gradients that carried the line from 30 to 1,145 feet (9.1 to 349.0 m) above sea level in its first 33 1/4 miles (53.5 km).

The new locomotive attracted considerable public interest, with details of its construction and trial running reported in the press. On 29 April 1928, S300 went on public display at Flinders Street station in conjunction with fund-raising efforts for the building of the Shrine of Remembrance. It was inspected by around 3,000 people.

With the delivery of a further two locomotives (S301 and S302) in February and April 1929, and the strengthening of the Murray River bridge at Albury to carry them, the S class displaced the older A2 class 4-6-0 locomotives from those services. The superior power of the S class had a profound impact on the timetable which, in July of that year, saw a cut of half an hour from the previous five-hour nineteen-minute northbound Sydney Limited schedule of A2-hauled trains. A fourth locomotive, S303, was delivered in November 1930. Its introduction enabled both ordinary and "limited" express services on the Albury line to be rostered for the S class, even if one of the class was in the workshops for repairs.

By 1931 however, a severe reduction in passenger traffic caused by the Great Depression saw the S class locomotives withdrawn from running the Sydney express services, and they were put to use on goods trains on the North Eastern line until passenger traffic picked up. As well as allowing the VR to deflect criticism of its investment in building the S class locomotives, the move also enabled the new X class goods locomotives to be reassigned from the Albury line to mainlines in other areas of the state, where they were reportedly used to considerable benefit.

By 1934, the S class locomotives were back in passenger service and, in an effort to improve their appearance, the VR broke with its policy of using an all-black locomotive livery and, between May and October, outshopped the class in a glossy, wagon red livery.

By July 1935, the S class locomotives had accelerated services once again. With the line speed limit raised to 70 miles per hour (112.7 km/h), the S class-hauled Sydney Limited was reported as being the fastest train in the Southern Hemisphere, with the southbound service running at an average speed of 48 miles per hour (77.25 km/h), including the five-minute stop at Seymour to take on water. The 129 1/4-mile (208.0 km) non-stop run between Seymour and Albury was also Australia's longest.

=== Design improvements ===
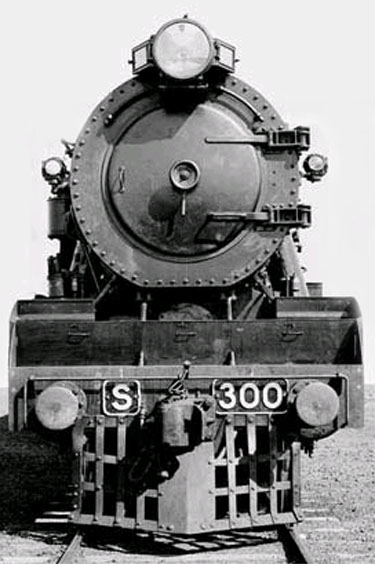
S300 as built in 1928

Initial tests with the prototype S300 revealed only average performance for a locomotive of such size. Further detailed study revealed that insufficient valve travel and narrow port openings were impairing performance and, based on that study, improvements were made to the three S class locomotives that followed, including a reported change from the 4 5/8 in (117 mm) travel, 1 1/16 in (27 mm) lap valve gear, shared with the N and X class locomotives, to a 6 in (152 mm) travel, 1 1/4 in (32 mm) lap valve gear.

When first constructed, the trailing delta truck axle under S300 had insufficient lateral damping and, when running at high speed around curves, tended to knock the track out of the ideal transition spiral alignment.

In April 1935, S303 was equipped with the VR's Modified Front End, to improve drafting and reduce cylinder back pressure. Tests showed a resultant increase in indicated horsepower from 1,560 hp (1,160 kW) to 1,920 hp (1,430 kW) at 30 mph (48 km/h). Smoke deflectors were fitted the following month to compensate for the reduced uplift of smoke from the redesigned exhaust and, between July 1935 and July 1936, the remainder of the class was similarly upgraded.

The boilers were modified to a design that incorporated a combustion chamber, arch tubes and thermic siphons. However, unlike its close relative the X class Mikado, the S class was not modified with Belpaire fireboxes, and retained its round-top boiler shape.

During dynamometer car testing with S301 in 1937, a maximum output of 2,300 drawbar horsepower (1,720 kW) at 45 mph (72 km/h) was recorded.

In common with the LNER Gresley Pacifics from which the design of the S class valve gear was derived, the centre cylinder and the big end bearing of the centre connecting rod were located beneath the steam chest and boiler, where they were exposed to great heat. That caused a problem, which was exacerbated by the reduced ventilation following the fitting of the streamlining associated with the Spirit of Progress service from 1937 onwards, coupled with the faster running speeds involved. The grease-lubricated locomotive axles also suffered overheating problems from the sustained higher-speed running. The VR dealt with both problems by switching to a "red oil" lubricant with a higher resistance to heat.

A final modification, late in the life of the S class, was their conversion to oil firing from February 1951 onwards. The scarcity of Maitland coal, and the unsatisfactory performance of the locomotives when using coal from other fields, began to adversely affect their performance and running schedules.

=== Spirit of Progress: 1937–1954 ===
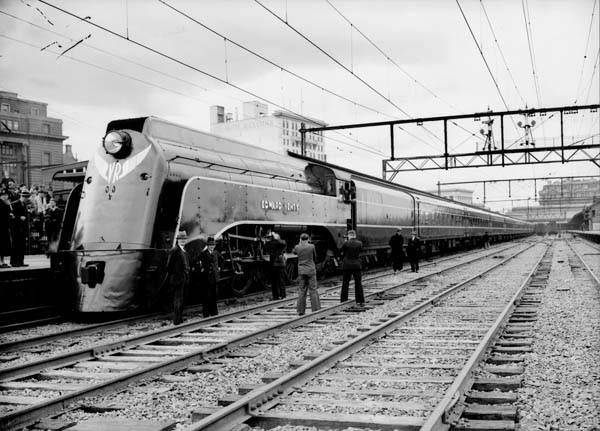
The Spirit of Progress press launch with locomotive S302 at Spencer Street station, prior to the demonstration run to Geelong, 17 November 1937

From November 1937, the S class was assigned to haul the VR's luxurious, all-steel, fully air-conditioned streamliner, the Spirit of Progress. At the time, they were the only passenger locomotives on the VR with enough power to take the Spirit's eleven-car trailing load of 544 long tons (553 t) unassisted over the 1 in 50 gradients between Melbourne and Albury.

Preparations for the S class to haul the Spirit of Progress were made as early as February 1937, when S301 was fitted with streamlined cladding that dramatically altered its appearance, together with a long-range tender, with capacity for the 13,000 imperial gallons (59,000 L; 16,000 US gal) of water and 8.5 long tons (8.6 t) of coal which enabled the train to travel the entire 190.5-mile (306.6 km) journey non-stop, at an average speed of 50 miles per hour (80 km/h) northbound and 52 miles per hour (84 km/h) southbound. S302 was similarly modified during August 1937. While initially painted wagon red, by November both streamlined locomotives were repainted in the royal blue and gold livery, designed to match the new Spirit of Progress carriages.

Along with their streamlining for the Spirit of Progress, the locomotives were also named after prominent figures in early Victorian history:

- S300: Matthew Flinders
- S301: Sir Thomas Mitchell
- S302: Edward Henty
- S303: CJ La Trobe

On the initial demonstration run of the Spirit of Progress to Geelong, S302 set an official Australian rail speed record of 79.5 miles per hour (127.9 km/h). In the context of the British locomotive Mallard reaching a recorded 126 miles per hour (202.8 km/h) in the following year, the speed of the Spirit was unremarkable, but the publicity surrounding the launch of the new streamliner, including footage of the train racing against an aircraft, captured the public imagination nevertheless, and was widely reported in contemporary press and newsreels.

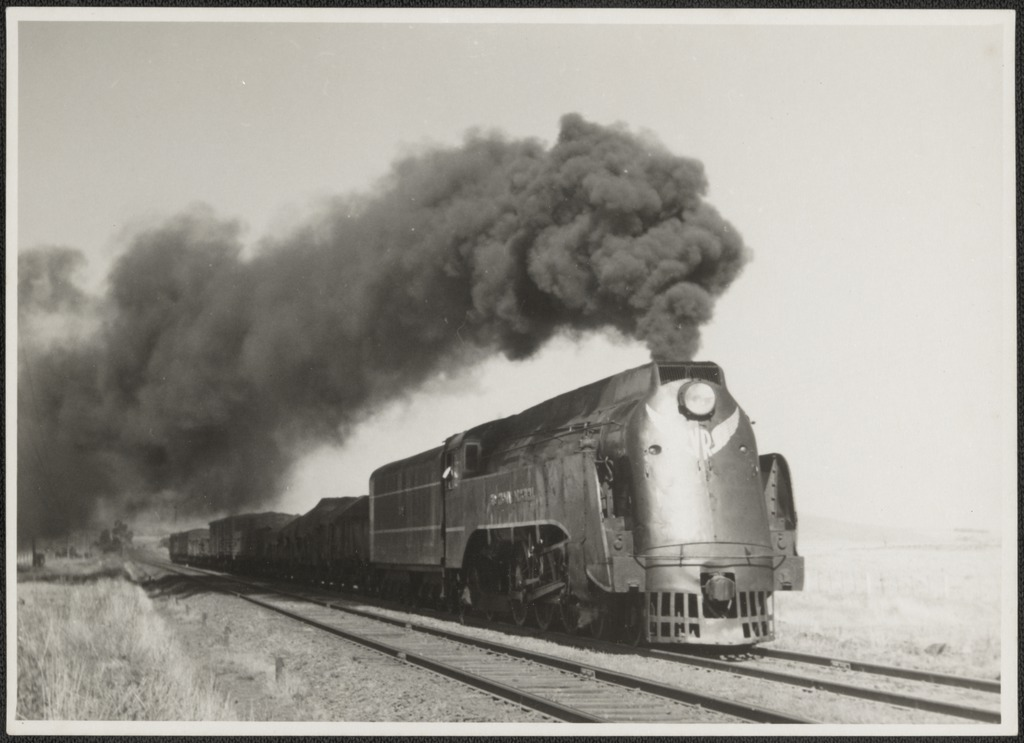
S class locomotives occasionally hauled freight services, as seen in this 1952 view of S301 at Beveridge, often when transferring between the Seymour locomotive depot and Newport Workshops for overhauls

Locomotives S300 and S303 continued to haul Melbourne to Albury services in their unstreamlined form until converted during major overhauls in March and October 1938 respectively. During that period, they operated the Spirit of Progress when no streamlined S class locomotive was available, with a stop at Seymour to take on water.

A minor change to the original streamlining was the removal of the solid cowcatcher and its replacement with a lattice type, after it was discovered that the original design created a partial vacuum behind the cowcatcher, which sucked dust and grime into the slide bars for the centre cylinder, creating maintenance problems.

=== Accidents ===
On 25 September 1933, S301 broke a driving axle while hauling the 16:00 express to Albury, causing the left centre driving wheel to separate from the locomotive. There were no casualties, although the locomotive suffered significant damage. An investigation into the accident found that the axles were overstressed, and the VR Commissioners announced that all four S class locomotives would be equipped with axles of a revised design.

On 1 September 1935, two S class locomotives, each hauling empty passenger trains, were involved in a fatal collision when one train ran into the rear of the other at speed. The locomotive of the following train destroyed the guards van and fatally injured the guard. Damage was estimated at nearly £10,000.

The side valances of the locomotives in streamlined form were prone to damage in the event of collision with trackside objects. During 1950, the valances were shortened to end at the buffer beam rather than extending to the base of the cowcatcher.

On 15 August 1952, S301 was involved in a fatal level crossing accident when it collided at high speed with a circus truck and trailer at Euroa, killing three people travelling in the truck. The accident caused significant damage to the streamlined cowling of the front of the locomotive. S 301 was temporarily repaired with a semi-streamlined appearance, featuring a standard VR pressed-steel slotted cowcatcher and a non-streamlined smokebox.

=== Demise ===
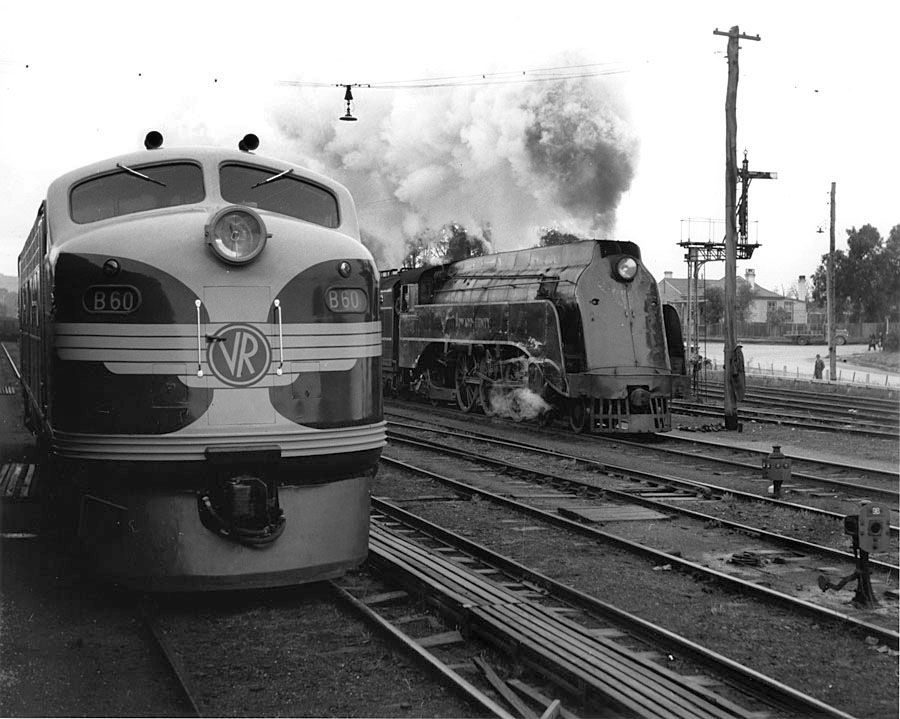
S302 at Seymour in July 1952 as B60 completes its delivery run to Melbourne

The S class was the first casualty of the Victorian Railways dieselisation program, which began in earnest with the delivery of B class mainline diesel electric locomotives in 1952. With their very limited route availability due to their high axle load, and the maintenance costs associated with their age and relatively high mileage, the decision was taken by the Victorian Railways Commissioners to withdraw from service and scrap the S class locomotives, as their mechanical condition dictated. First to go was S301, in September 1953, with worn cylinders, being recorded as scrapped on 16 October 1953. Usable parts were stored as spares for the three remaining S class locomotives, but the end was drawing near.

Following successful trials, the B class diesel-electric locomotives replaced the S class locomotives on the Spirit of Progress in April 1954. The superseded locomotives were rapidly withdrawn and scrapped, with S302 being recorded as scrapped on 2 July 1954 and S303 being recorded as scrapped on 28 May 1954. In June 1954, the last example, class leader S300, was withdrawn, being recorded as scrapped three months later, on 17 September 1954.

== Preservation ==
Brass name and number retrieved from S303 on display at the Australian Railway Historical Society Museum

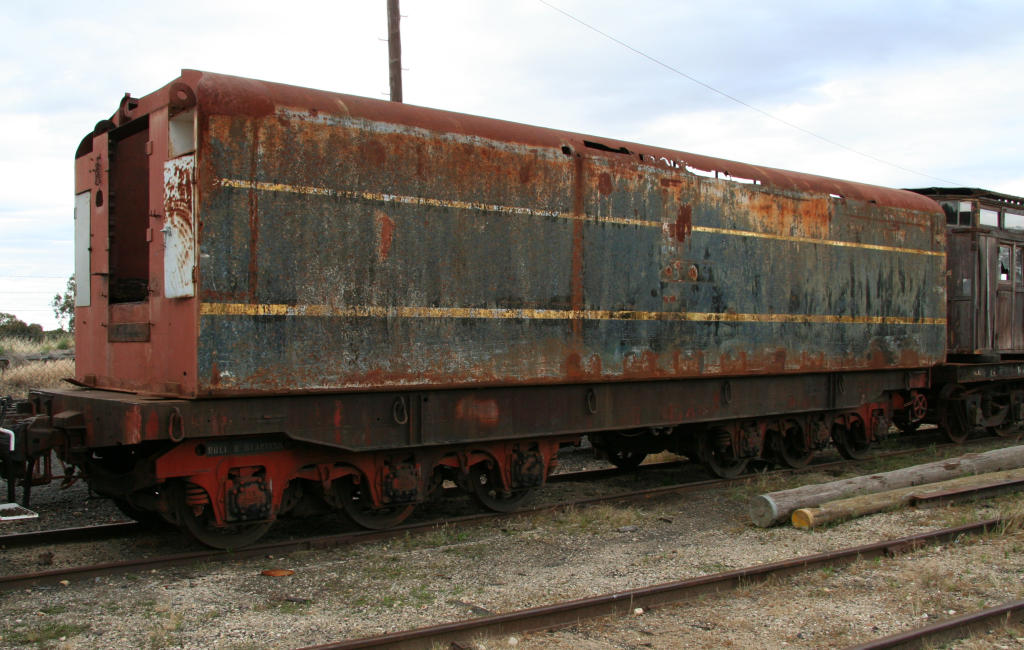
S class tender body and underframe stored at the Seymour Railway Heritage Centre

Despite their key place in Australian transport history, and at least one attempt to set aside an example for future preservation, the S class locomotives were scrapped before the rail preservation movement had gained enough momentum to avoid the loss of the entire class. However, the Australian Railway Historical Society has noted that the loss of the S class helped to galvanise railway enthusiasts into lobbying for the preservation of other VR locomotives (beginning with the X class), and the establishment of the Australian Railway Historical Society Museum.

The enormous tender tanks of the S class found a new use as tankers for weed-spraying of VR tracks, and the tender frames and bogies were also converted into QH heavy duty flat wagons. One of the 2,000 gallon oil tanks retrieved from an S class tender was used in April 1954 to convert R-class locomotive R748 to oil firing.

Two of the four tender frames have been earmarked for preservation by the Newport Railway Museum, and are currently used as workshop vehicles at the Newport Workshops numbered VFGA3 & VFGA4. One tender frame and tank are stored by Steamrail Victoria. The fourth tender frame is in the possession of the Seymour Railway Heritage Centre, which now has had a tender body placed on it.

The names and numbers of the four S class steam locomotives were carried over in the same order to the S class diesels introduced in 1957.

At least one of the S class locomotives' whistles survived, and when the Australian Railway Historical Society operated a 50th Anniversary run of the Spirit of Progress on 14 November 1987, it was fitted to R class locomotive R707 to help recreate the sound of the original S class-hauled service.

These and other remnants, such as the Spirit of Progress locomotive name and number plates, are all that remains of the S class steam locomotives today.
