= Brisbane Limited =

Former passenger train in Australia

Overview
- Service type: Passenger train
- Status: Ceased
- Last service: February 1990
- Successor: Unnamed XPT service
- Former operator: State Rail Authority

Route
- Termini: Sydney Central; Wallangarra (until 1930); South Brisbane (1930–86); Roma Street (from 1986)
- Distance travelled: 700 km (until 1930); 920 km (from 1930)
- Service frequency: daily in each direction
- Train number: NL1/NL2
- Lines used: Main Northern (until 1930); North Coast (from 1930)

The Brisbane Limited was an Australian passenger train service operated by the New South Wales Government Railways between Sydney and Brisbane from 1888 until February 1990. The route is now served by an unnamed XPT service.

== History ==
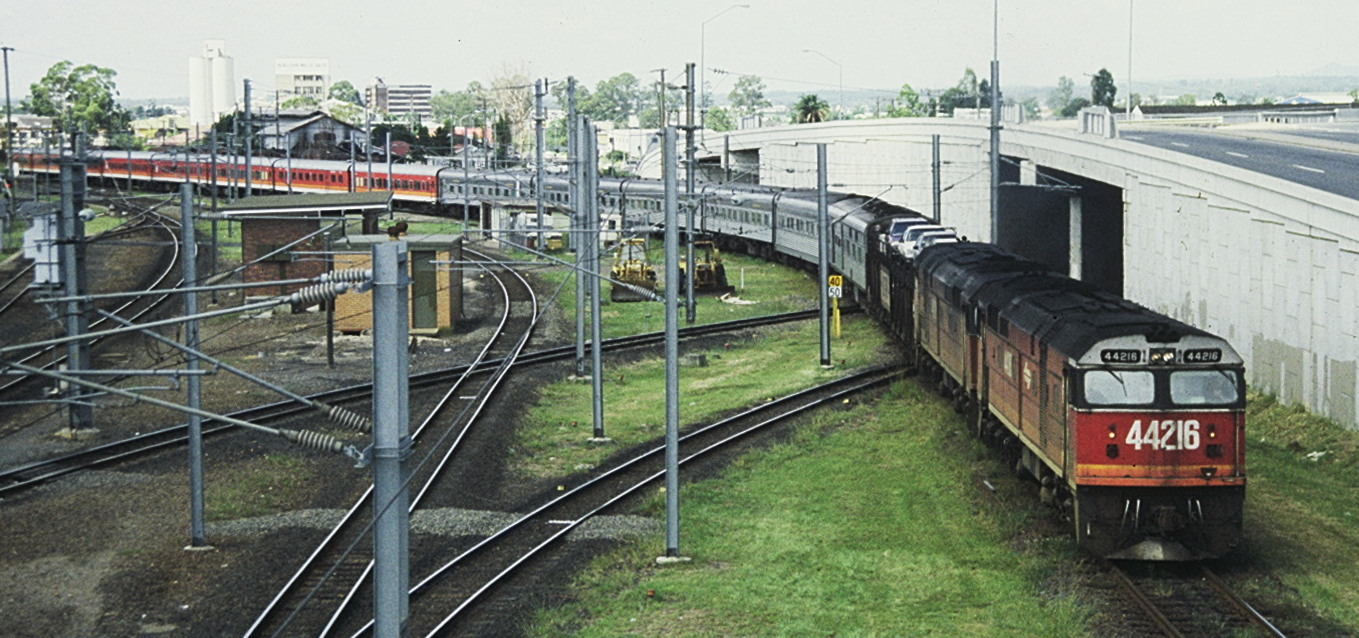
44216 and another haul the northbound Brisbane Limited across the Corinda line at Yeerongpilly in 1987

The Brisbane Limited originally operated from Sydney via the Main Northern line to Wallangarra. A change of gauge required passengers to change here for a narrow gauge Queensland Railways train on its Southern line to complete the journey to Brisbane.

The Limited service was also known as a 'limited express'; its daily service ran in parallel with a 'mail train', open to passengers, which featured more stops and took several hours longer.

Following the extension of the North Coast line to South Brisbane in September 1930, it was rerouted shaving six hours off the journey time, even allowing for the need for the train to be taken over the Clarence River by barge pending the completion of the Grafton Bridge. This occurred in May 1932. Its headcode was NL1/NL2.

In the early 1950s, it began to be worked by diesel locomotives and from January 1960 was hauled by 46 class electric locomotives south of Gosford. Also in 1960 stainless steel sleeping carriages were introduced.

From June 1984, it was hauled by electric locomotives to Broadmeadow, and in June 1986 was extended at its northern end over the Merivale Bridge to Roma Street. It was withdrawn in February 1990 to be replaced by an unnamed XPT service.
