= Southern Aurora =

Former passenger train service in Australia

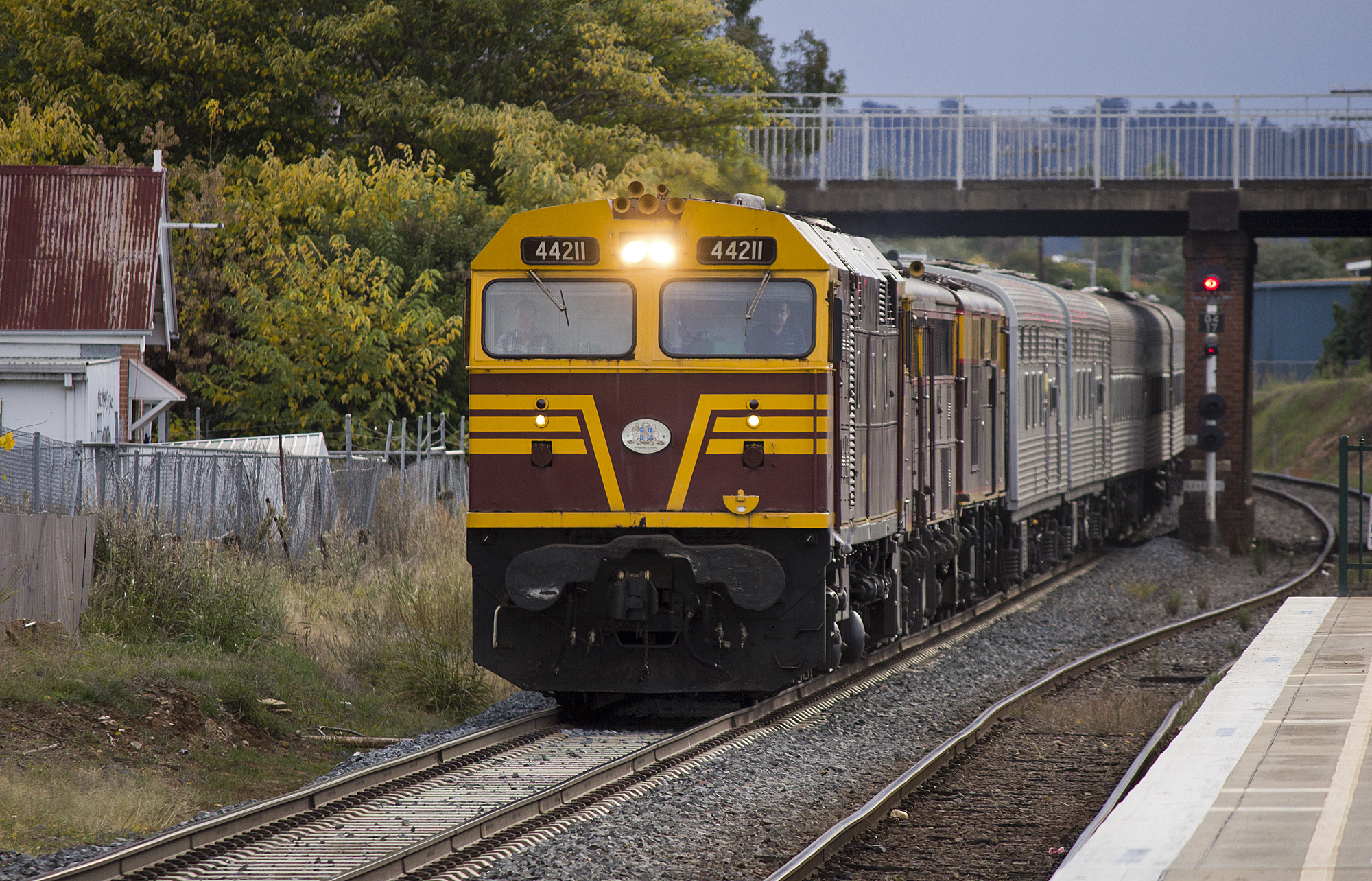
- Preserved version of the Southern Aurora at Wagga Wagga station in April 2012

Overview
- Service type: Overnight sleeper train
- Status: Ceased
- First service: 13 April 1962
- Last service: 2 August 1986
- Successor: Sydney/Melbourne Express
- Former operators: State Rail Authority; V/Line

Route
- Termini: Sydney; Melbourne
- Distance travelled: 956 kilometres
- Service frequency: Nightly in each direction
- Train number: SL1/SL2
- Lines used: Main South, NSW; North East, Victoria

Technical
- Rolling stock: Stainless steel carriages
- Track gauge: 1,435 mm (4 ft 8 1/2 in)

The Southern Aurora was an overnight express passenger train that operated between Australia's two largest cities, Sydney and Melbourne. First-class throughout, including the dining facilities, the Southern Aurora featured all-sleeper accommodation. The train first ran on 13 April 1962 after the opening of the North East standard gauge line from Melbourne to Albury, eliminating the break-of-gauge between the capital cities.

== History ==
A fleet of 34 stainless steel carriages was jointly purchased by the Department of Railways New South Wales and Victorian Railways featuring fluted sides and consisted of roomette and twinette sleepers, lounge cars and diners. A motorail service was added from July 1973 which enabled passengers to travel and take their cars.

On 7 February 1969 the train was involved in the Violet Town railway disaster, when the southbound Southern Aurora collided head on with a northbound freight train, resulting in eight deaths and the destruction of two S class locomotives and seven carriages.

With declining passenger numbers, it was decided to combine the Spirit of Progress and Southern Aurora into one train, the Sydney/Melbourne Express. The Southern Aurora ran for the last time on 2 August 1986.

After the demise of sleeper trains in the early 1990s, many of the carriages passed to the Australian Railway Historical Society, Canberra Railway Museum and New South Wales Rail Transport Museum (now the NSW Rail Museum) who have maintained them in operational condition. The latter often operates them on tours under the Southern Aurora banner.

From December 2017 four NAM Twinette carriages were restored at the Lithgow State Mine Heritage Park & Railway on behalf of Vintage Rail Journeys. From September 2019, two LAN Roomette carriages, one NAM Twinette carriage and one MHN Luggage were restored at the Goulburn Rail Heritage Centre (GRHC) on behalf of Vintage Rail Journeys.

== See also ==
- Intercapital Daylight
- Spirit of Progress
- Sydney/Melbourne Express
