= Rabbie Beveridge =

Scottish footballer (1877–1901)

Personal information
- Full name: Robert Beveridge
- Date of birth: 24 June 1877
- Place of birth: Polmadie, Scotland
- Date of death: 11 October 1901 (aged 24)
- Place of death: Gorbals, Scotland
- Position: Centre forward

Senior career*
Years	Team	Apps	(Gls)
1894–1895	Maryhill Harp		
1895–1899	Third Lanark	58	(22)
1899–1900	Nottingham Forest	32	(5)
1900–1901	Everton	4	(0)
Total		94	(27)
- * Club domestic league appearances and goals

Robert Beveridge (24 June 1877 – 11 October 1901) was a Scottish footballer who played as a centre forward in the Football League for Everton and Nottingham Forest.

He came into consideration for an international cap at the age of 20 while with Third Lanark, taking part in one of the trial matches in 1898, but this did not lead on to selection for Scotland. He died of phthisis pulmonalis (tuberculosis) aged 24.
