= Hunter Valley Railway Trust =

- Location within New South Wales
- Established: 1975
- Dissolved: 2022
- Location: North Rothbury, New South Wales Australia
- Coordinates: 32°40′53.5″S 151°20′40″E
- Type: Railway museum
- Collection size: ex New South Wales Government Railways rolling stock and privately owned locomotives
- Website: www.huntervalleyrailwaytrust.com.au

The Hunter Valley Railway Trust was a collection of items located in North Rothbury, New South Wales, Australia on the site of the Rothbury Riot. It included various types of rolling stock, such as coal and freight wagons and passenger coaches, and a variety of ex-New South Wales Government Railways locomotives. It also included seven of the fourteen heritage-listed South Maitland Railways 10 Class locomotives, until they were sold. In 2022, the trust was evicted to make way for housing after a Supreme Court of New South Wales court case.
