= Spirit of Progress =

Victorian Railways express passenger train

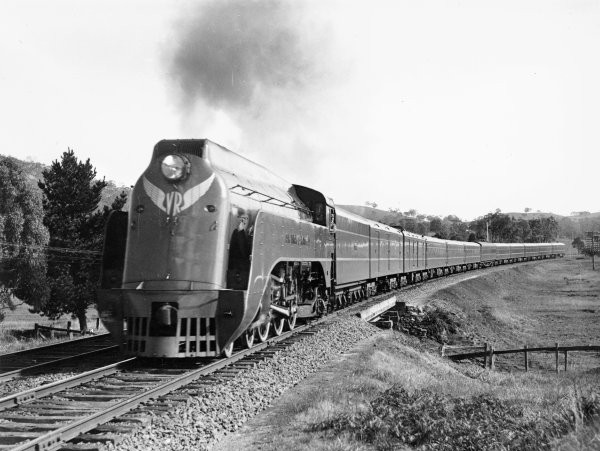
- The Spirit of Progress headed by S301 Sir Thomas Mitchell near Kilmore East in 1938

Overview
- Status: Ceased
- Predecessor: Sydney Limited
- First service: 24 November 1937
- Last service: 2 August 1986
- Successor: Sydney/Melbourne Express
- Former operators: V/Line; State Rail Authority

Route
- Termini: Melbourne; Albury (1937–1962); Sydney (1962–1986)
- Distance travelled: 1937–62: 190.5 miles (306.6 km); 1962–86: 594 miles (956 km)
- Service frequency: Daily
- Train number: SL3/SL4
- Lines used: North East, Victoria; Main South, NSW (1962–1986)

The Spirit of Progress was the premier express passenger train on the Victorian Railways in Australia, running from Melbourne to the New South Wales border at Albury, and later through to Sydney.

== Route ==
From its introduction in November 1937 until April 1962 the train service ran on 1,600 mm (5 ft 3 in) broad gauge line from Melbourne's Spencer Street station to Albury, on the New South Wales / Victorian border, where passengers changed to a New South Wales Government Railways train (the Melbourne Limited Express), running on 1,435 mm (4 ft 8 1/2 in) standard gauge track to complete the journey to Sydney. Following the completion of the standard gauge line between Melbourne and Albury in April 1962 the Spirit of Progress was extended to Sydney.

== History ==
=== Broad gauge service (1937–1962) ===
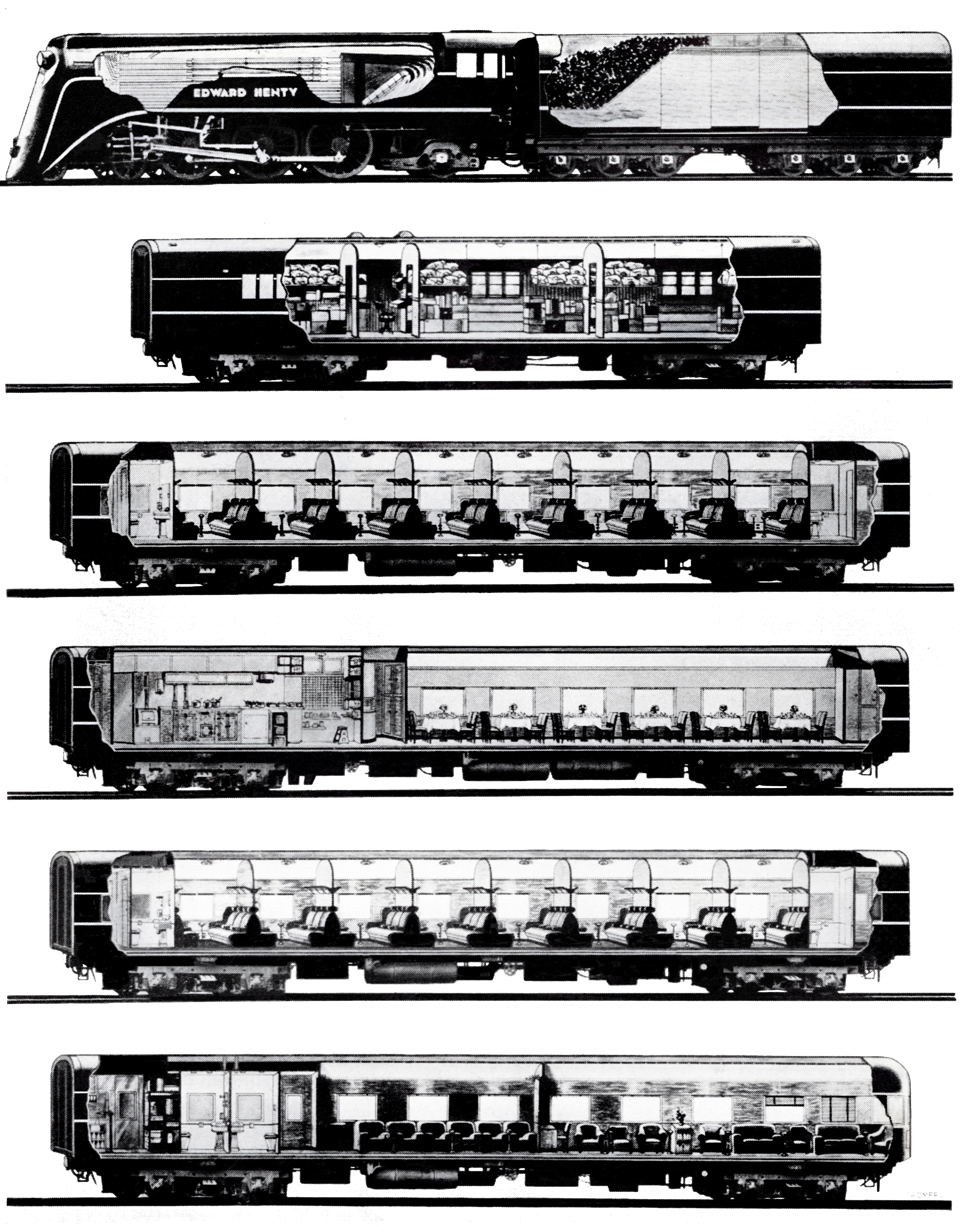
Cross-sections of Spirit of Progress locomotive and rolling stock

Victorian Railways promotional poster advertising the new Spirit of Progress service

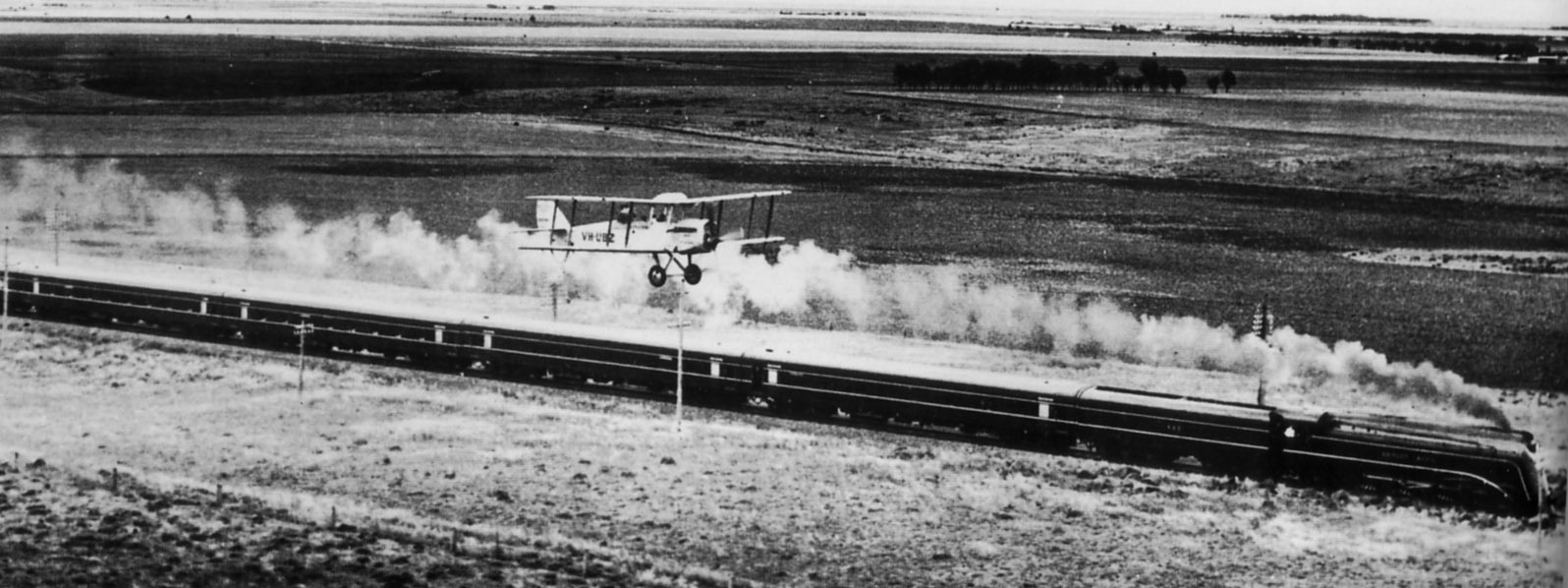
The Spirit of Progress racing an Airco DH.4 aeroplane between Melbourne and Geelong on 17 November 1937

The Spirit of Progress ushered in a standard of passenger train speed and comfort not previously seen in Australia. Its introduction in November 1937 marked the culmination of many years of preparatory work by the Victorian Railways, from the laying of heavier rail on the North East line, introduction of Automatic Staff Exchange apparatus to allow continuous high speed running between track sections, introduction of high-powered three-cylinder Pacific locomotives, and the testing of air conditioning equipment on passenger rolling stock. Such was the commitment of VR Chief Commissioner Harold Clapp to introducing a world-class train service to Victorian Railways, virtually no detail was overlooked. VR engineers famously road-tested the new train's smoothness on curves by studying a full bowl of soup in the dining car as the train took curves at full speed; if the soup splashed over the side of the bowl a decision would be taken whether to modify the curve for higher speeds or reduce the speed limit for the curve. Harold Clapp could not, however, take credit for the name for the service; when discussing with his wife his proposed Royal Victorian name (inspired by the LMS Royal Scot), Mrs Clapp suggested, on the spur of the moment, Spirit of Progress.

==== Design and innovation ====
When introduced, the train featured many innovations new or recently introduced to Australian railway practice, such as streamlining, full air-conditioning, and all-steel carriage construction. Its overall exterior and interior design reflected the latest Art Deco style, and interior fittings used materials such as stainless steel and native Australian blackwood veneers. The luxurious new train also featured a dining car with a modern galley kitchen modelled after the most up-to-date hospital kitchens of the period and, at the rear, a round-ended parlour/observation car offering panoramic views of the Victorian countryside as it disappeared into the distance.

==== Motive power ====
VR's three-cylinder S class 4-6-2 steam locomotives were assigned to haul the train, which typically had an eleven-car trailing load of 544 long tons (553 t), over the 1 in 50 gradients between Melbourne and Albury. Although the locomotives had been in service since 1928, their appearance was dramatically altered with the addition of streamlining, along with royal blue and gold livery designed to seamlessly match the carriages of the train. The locomotives were also equipped with long range tenders, with enough water and coal capacity to enable the train to travel the entire 190.5-mile (306.6 km) journey between Albury and Melbourne non-stop, at an average speed of 52 miles per hour (84 km/h), a schedule that was the longest non-stop train journey in Australia, and held the record as the fastest for the next twenty years. Until the conversion of the S class locomotives to oil firing (which commenced from February 1951), the locomotive fireman was charged with the formidable task of shovelling six to seven tons of coal into the firebox during the course of each journey, in order to generate enough power to maintain the schedule.

==== Launch ====
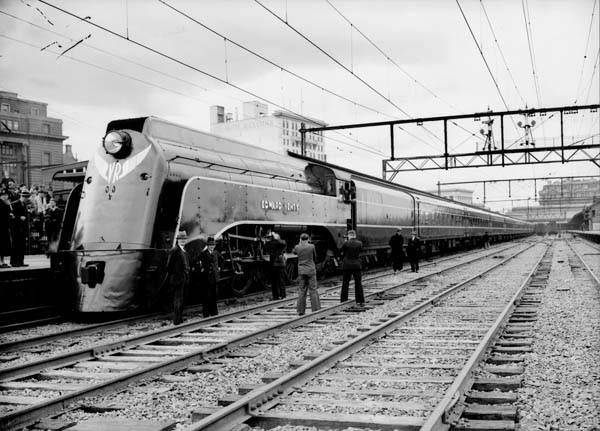
Press launch with S302 Edward Henty at Spencer Street station prior to the demonstration run to Geelong on 17 November 1937

The Spirit of Progress was launched on 17 November 1937 in a blaze of publicity, which included dramatic footage being taken of the new train racing Airco DH.4 aeroplane VH-UBZ Spirit of Melbourne on its demonstration run to Geelong. In an elaborate launch ceremony at Spencer Street station, Premier Albert Dunstan opened the Parlor Car with a gold key.

Three hundred invited guests joined the train for the inaugural run, ranging from Attorney-General of Australia former Railways Minister Robert Menzies to Mr AO Henty, descendant of Edward Henty, the Victorian pioneer after whom the train's locomotive was named. The train reached 74 mph (119.1 km/h) against a headwind on the Down journey to Geelong, and on the return leg reached a new official Australian rail speed record of 79.5 mph (127.9 km/h) between Werribee and at Laverton before speed was cut to avoid stray livestock on an unprotected level crossing.

While not officially acknowledged, the steam-hauled Spirit of Progress is reported on occasion to have reached speeds as high as 86 mph (138.4 km/h) while in regular service. Flaman speed recorder paper tape records were taken for every journey.

==== Regular service ====
After the successful launch of the service, the train settled into a routine that remained relatively unchanged for the next fifteen years. It departed Spencer Street station at 18:30 each evening, arriving at Albury at 22:20. As well as cleaning of carriages and servicing of the locomotive, staff would also reverse the train back across the Murray River bridge to a turning triangle at Wodonga. This ensured that the locomotive and parlour car were facing in the correct direction for the return trip to Melbourne, which departed at 07:55 the following morning and arrived at Spencer Street station at 11:35. In Melbourne, the train was turned using a balloon loop.

After a year in service, the train was credited with having increased patronage to 209,000 passengers, an increase of 28,000 or 15% over the number carried by the Sydney Limited in its last year of operation. By 22 November 1939 annual patronage had increased again to 222,371.

A 1:7 scale model of Spirit of Progress rolling stock made up part of the Australian Travel Exhibit at the 1939 New York World's Fair.

==== Typical consist of steam-hauled Spirit of Progress ====
When the Spirit of Progress began service in November 1937, it ran the following consist:

- Victorian Railways S class steam locomotive
- guard's van (later classed CS)
- four second class cars (later classed BS)
- dining car (later named Murray)
- four first class cars (later classed AS)
- parlor car (later named Norman)

An additional first class car and a bulk mail van (later classed "DS") were built in April 1938. One second class car was removed from the standard consist to make way for the mail van. This left one spare sitting car of each class.

From 1941, the Spirit was occasionally hauled by VR's H class 4-8-4 locomotive in the event of one of the S class locomotives not being available. Although the H class was limited to a maximum 60 mph (96 km/h) top speed, its superior performance climbing steep gradients along the route reportedly compensated for its reduced top speed enabling it to maintain the timetable.

==== Conversion to diesel-electric power ====
Victorian Railways publicity photograph of B class diesel-hauled Spirit of Progress consist, 1953

From 1952, deliveries of B class diesel locomotives commenced and the new locomotives quickly proved their superiority to steam traction in availability, reliability, and cost-effectiveness of operation. Following successful trials, the B class locomotives replaced the S class locomotives on the Spirit of Progress roster from April 1954. None of the iconic streamlined steam locomotives were saved for preservation, all were withdrawn and scrapped by September 1954.

From 1956, some key changes to the consist occurred. VR and the New South Wales Government Railways introduced a new daylight connecting service between Melbourne and Sydney, the Intercapital Daylight, and the Parlor Car was removed from the Spirit and transferred to the new day train. At the same time, VR introduced open, "saloon" style Z type carriages which later began to supplement the original compartment carriages of 1937 in the Spirit consist.

From 1957 onwards, the Spirit of Progress was hauled by the new S class diesel locomotives which inherited the class designation from the previous steam locomotives. The first four carried over the names and numbers of the former S class steam locomotives.

The train remained popular through the 1950s. By the time Victorian Railways celebrated the 21st anniversary of the introduction of the Spirit of Progress with a 75-pound (34 kg) birthday cake for passengers on 23 November 1958 service, the train was still carrying 200,000 passengers per year.

=== Standard gauge service (1962–1986) ===
Following the completion of the standard gauge line between Melbourne and Albury in April 1962, the Spirit of Progress began running through to Sydney. To operate a service each night in each direction two train consists were formed. Only the guard's vans from the original 1937 set were transferred to the standard gauge the rest of the stock having been built in 1955–62.

The final run of the broad gauge Spirit of Progress and the inaugural run of the standard gauge service saw a brief return of steam power on the train. Veteran A2 class locomotives A2 995 and A2 996 hauled the final broad gauge Spirit of Progress from Seymour to Melbourne on 16 April 1962. When the inaugural standard gauge Spirit of Progress from Melbourne reached Albury, the VR diesel locomotive was detached and NSWGR 3830 and 3813 completed the journey to Sydney. On regular services New South Wales 42 class locomotives were used between Albury and Sydney.

==== Secondary role ====
From April 1962 the Spirit of Progress' role as the premier train on the route was usurped by the new stainless steel, all-sleeping car limited stops express, the Southern Aurora. The Spirit of Progress now stopped at intermediate stations not served by the Southern Aurora, such as Goulburn.

The Spirit of Progress conveyed a through car between Melbourne and Canberra, three days per week in each direction from April 1962 until March 1975. The through carriage was detached at Goulburn and conveyed to Canberra attached to a mixed train.

The Spirit could no longer be considered a high-speed train service, with a timetabled 13-hour-45-minute journey from Melbourne to Sydney. It had also effectively ceased being a streamliner when hood unit X class diesels began hauling it between Melbourne and Albury after 1966, and rolling stock such as sleeping cars and power vans from other trains with different liveries began to appear in consists.

The sitting car compartment style accommodation offered by the Spirit of Progress, while exceptionally comfortable by 1937 standards for a 3¾ hour journey to Albury, was less than luxurious by 1962 standards for a 13¾ hour overnight journey to Sydney. Key features of the original Spirit of Progress consist, including the dining car and observation car, were not included in the new standard gauge service, decreasing its amenity and prestige.

==== Typical consist of 1970s Spirit of Progress ====
The following consist was recorded for a Spirit of Progress service that arrived in Melbourne on 30 April 1977:

- X 50 diesel locomotive
- VP 110 (VR freight louvre van)
- PHN 2361 (VR&NSWGR joint stock power/brakevan)
- LAN 2344 (VR&NSWGR joint stock roomette sleeping car)
- NAM 2375 (NSWGR twinette sleeping car)
- VBK 4 (VR first class saloon sitting car)
- VFS 1, VFX 2 (VR second class compartment sitting cars)
- VRS 1 (VR 27-seat buffet car)
- VFK 3, VFK 5, VFK 4 (VR second class saloon sitting cars)
- VFR 1 (VR second class sitting compartment car with auxiliary buffet compartment)
- VHN 1 (VR guard's van)

== Demise ==
With declining passenger numbers it was decided to combine the Spirit of Progress and Southern Aurora into one train, the Sydney/Melbourne Express. The Spirit of Progress ran for the last time on 2 August 1986. V/Line rostered S301 Sir Thomas Mitchell to haul the last journeys in Victoria.

It is perhaps a measure of the high standard of speed set by the Spirit in 1937 that even 78 years later, the fastest NSW TrainLink XPT service between Melbourne and Albury at 3 hours 20 minutes, is only 20 minutes faster than the timetabled 3-hour 40-minute journey time of the 1937 steam-hauled Spirit of Progress service.

Much of the original Spirit of Progress rolling stock remained in use on regular long distance intrastate service for VR and its successor V/Line, and for a period of time the private rail operator West Coast Railway. It is perhaps a measure of the high standard of the Spirit of Progress rolling stock that the last of the "BS" class of compartment cars was only retired by V/Line in July 2006, almost 69 years after their introduction, and with a boom in V/Line patronage a set comprising five BS carriages was re-introduced to service from September 2007 before being withdrawn in August 2010.

== Commemorative services ==
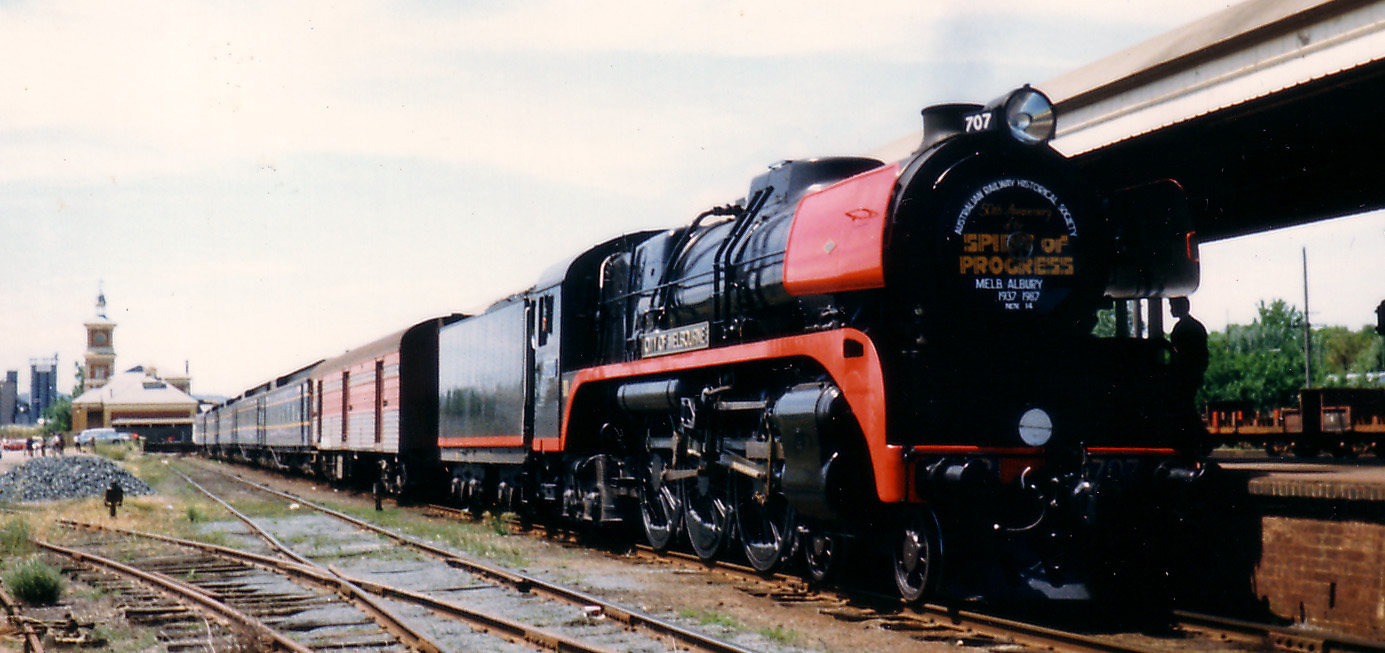
The 50th-anniversary Spirit of Progress hauled by R707 awaits departure from Albury on 14 November 1987

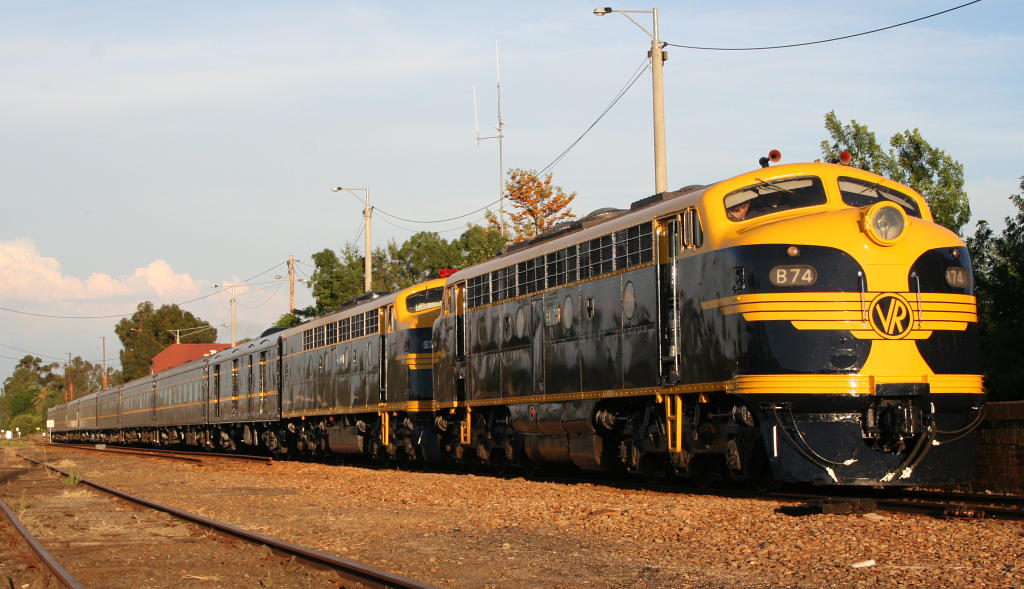
The 70th anniversary Spirit of Progress hauled by B74 and S303 with 8 of the original 1937 carriages at Benalla on 25 November 2007

A number of special commemorative runs of the Spirit of Progress have operated since the end of the regular train service.

To mark the 50th anniversary of the first train, a commemorative train organised by the Australian Railway Historical Society ran on 14 November 1987. With the original 1937 S type carriages still in regular service with V/Line (and painted in V/Line's tangerine livery) the 50th anniversary train instead consisted of the last remaining set of air-conditioned blue and gold E type carriages then operated by V/Line, hauled by R707, with Parlor Car Norman the only vehicle in the train from the original Spirit of Progress consist.

For the 60th anniversary, on 22 November 1997 a commemorative service ran, running in a mix of liveries with nine S type carriages from West Coast Railway and V/Line, and two S class diesels hauling the train.

For the 70th anniversary VicTrack, the Department of Infrastructure, and the Victorian Government funded the restoration of the remaining carriages for use on a special train. Eight original carriages were assembled; and Parlor Car, Dining Car, brake van 1 CS, and diesel locomotives B74 and S303 were repainted into VR livery. The Seymour Railway Heritage Centre operated train ran from Melbourne to Albury on 25 November 2007.

For the first time in 33 years, the Spirit of Progress was scheduled to travel from Melbourne to Sydney departing Southern Cross station on 31 March 2020. The train would have arrived into Sydney's Central station on the evening of 1 April 2020. This heritage rail tour was organised by Cruise Express. However, due to the effects of the COVID-19 pandemic, this run was cancelled.

Another rail tour by Cruise Express was scheduled to run from Melbourne to Sydney departing on the morning of 18 March 2021 and arriving on the afternoon of 19 March 2021, after an overnight stopover in Albury. It would then run from Sydney to Melbourne, departing on the morning of 22 March 2021 and arriving in the afternoon of 23 March 2021, after an overnight stopover in Albury. However, these runs were postponed, due to border closures as a result of the COVID-19 pandemic.

== Legacy ==
In 2007 the new Hume Highway bridge built over the Murray River as part of the Albury bypass was named the Spirit of Progress in recognition of the former train service.
