= Beveridge, California =

Unincorporated community in California, United States

Beveridge
- Unincorporated community
- Location in California Beveridge (the United States)
- Coordinates: 36°42′16″N 117°54′54″W
- Country: United States
- State: California
- County: Inyo
- Elevation: 5,587 ft (1,703 m)

Beveridge is an unincorporated community and ghost town located in Inyo County, California, United States. It lies at an elevation of 5587 feet (1703 m) on the eastern slope of the Inyo Mountains. Beveridge was a mining boom town, and was named in honor of early Owens Valley resident John Beveridge.

== History ==
Gold was discovered in the area around Beverige in November 1877 by William Lyle Hunter and others. The Beveridge Mining District was established in early 1878. Beveridge gold mining camp, which existed between the 1880s and the 1910s, was within Beveridge Canyon at the eastern side of the Inyo Mountains. Beveridge's post office was established on October 31, 1881 (with William C. Kisling acting as postmaster), but mail service was discontinued on June 5, 1882.

== Namesake ==
The town and mining district were both named for John Beveridge, an early Owens Valley resident credited with mining discoveries in the Inyo Mountains east of the silver boom town Cerro Gordo.

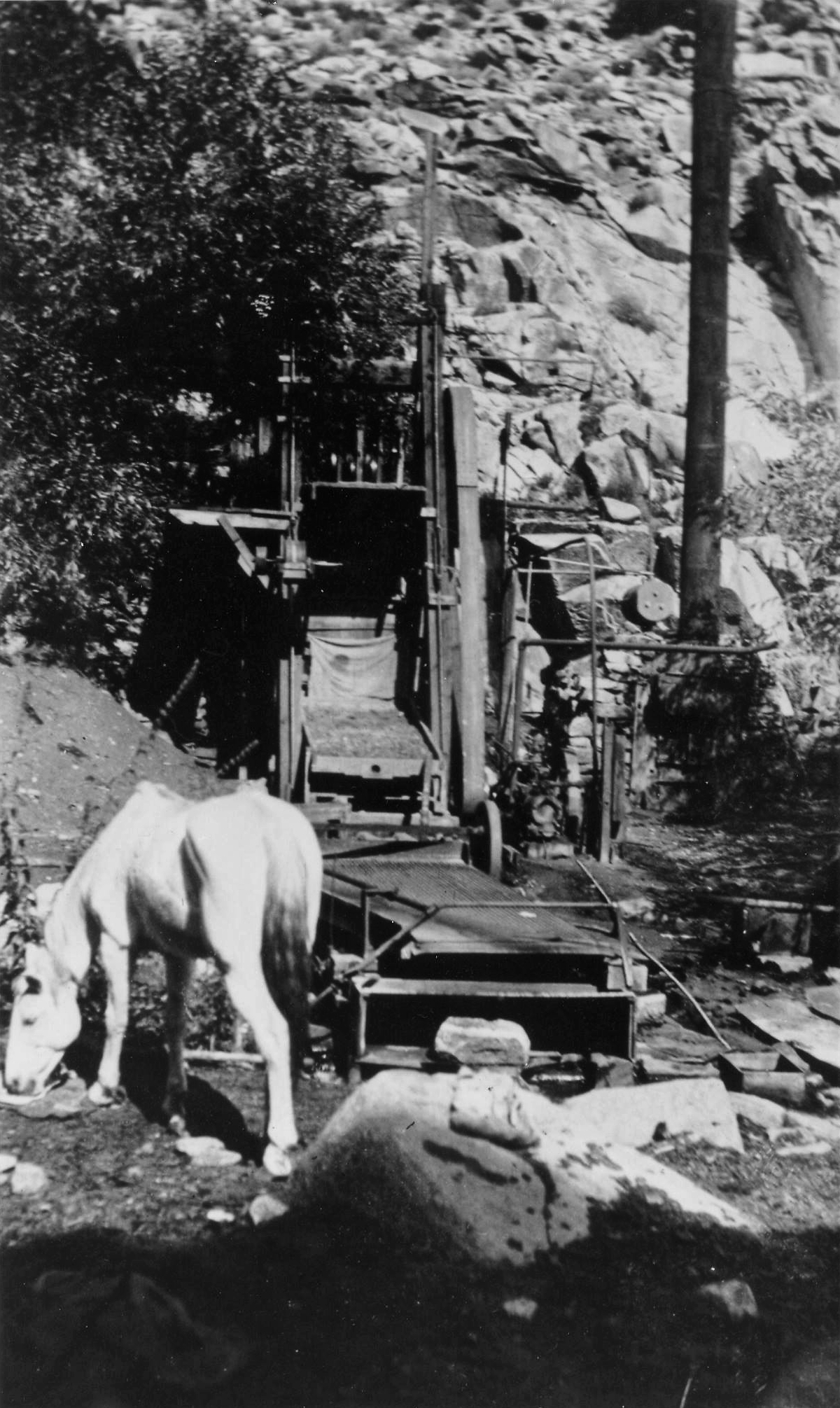
Beveridge in 1908

John Beveridge was born in New York around 1839 and was educated as a lawyer before turning to mining. He was appointed Justice of the Peace in the early Owens Valley town of Bend City sometime prior to 1866 (when the area was still part of Tulare County). In the 1866 election shortly after the formation of Inyo County, Beveridge was elected the county's first district attorney, but "failed to qualify." In 1869, he was again elected as district attorney, but once again "did not qualify." Beveridge co-owned the Belmont Mine with William Lyle Hunter. Hunter also acted as the executor of Beveridge's estate following his death.

John Beveridge died at Cerro Gordo on October 22, 1874 at the age of about 35. His obituary in the Inyo Independent wrote that "he had given away to a habit which probably [caused] his own death, and certainly has sent to early graves so many of society's brightest ornaments." Years later, a resident remembered Beveridge's service as "the largest funeral Cerro Gordo [had] witnessed] up until that point, and for several years afterwards.

== Present-day ==
Beveridge is now considered a ghost town, the nearest settlement being Lone Pine in Owens Valley, 11 miles (18 km) southwest on Route 395. The Saline Valley is 4 miles (6 km) to the east. There are remnants of cabins, mining equipment, and rock-built structures. The town can only be accessed via a strenuous hike from the west along the Beverige Canyon Trail. The mine is listed in the U.S. Geological Survey Mineral Resources Data System (MRDS) as "Beveridge Canyon Mn No. 12".
