= Sydney–Melbourne Express =

Former overnight rail passenger train between the cities of Melbourne and Sydney

Overview
- Service type: Overnight sleeper train
- Status: Ceased
- Predecessor: Southern Aurora; Spirit of Progress
- First service: 3 August 1986
- Last service: 21 November 1993
- Successor: Unnamed XPT service
- Former operators: State Rail Authority; V/Line

Route
- Termini: Sydney; Melbourne
- Distance travelled: 956 kilometres (594 mi)
- Service frequency: Once nightly in each direction
- Train numbers: SL1 and SL2
- Lines used: Main South, NSW; North East, Victoria

The Sydney–Melbourne Express was an overnight intercapital passenger train service that operated between Australia's largest two cities, Sydney and Melbourne, between August 1986 and November 1993. Operated jointly by State Rail Authority and V/Line the name depended on the direction of travel, with the train nicknamed the 'Sex' or 'Mex'.

The Sydney–Melbourne Express was formed to replace the Spirit of Progress and Southern Aurora to cut operating costs of the intercapital rail service with the first train operating on 2 August 1986. The last Melbourne Express ran on the night of 20 November 1993 ex Sydney, with the last Sydney Express running ex Melbourne on 21 November. It was replaced by an unnamed XPT service that continues today.

== Operation ==
The Sydney–Melbourne Express used the rolling stock of its two predecessor trains: including New South Wales and Victorian lounge, dining, buffet, sleeping and sitting carriages. A usual consist had two sleeping cars, being increased to three in busier periods. The timetable had the running time of the Southern Aurora with the stopping pattern of the Spirit of Progress. When operations commenced the train operated as a 'first division' of sleeping cars followed by a 'second division' with the sitting cars, but was later altered to be a 17-vehicle-long train.

A motorail wagon was also attached for the carriage of passengers' motor vehicles. The motive power was usually a single NSW 81 class or V/Line G class, with a second locomotive often attached for the steeper grades between Albury and Sydney. Onboard catering crew included a drink steward in the lounge, two cooks, a head waiter, three table waiters in the dining car, and four buffet staff. Four conductors were also employed to serve the sitting and sleeping car passengers.

When introduced, a typical consist for the Sydney Express would be Locomotive-MHN-VFS-VFK-VRS-VFX-VBK-NAM-LAN-NAM-LAN-RMS-BCS-DAM-LAN-NAM-PHN-MBY; in holidays this would change to an all-sleeper consist, with a separately scheduled relief train with Locomotive-MHN or VHN, VFR-VFKx3-VRS-VFX-VBKx2-PHN.

In February 1990, an across-the-board cut in NSW rail services, the Sex/Mex lost the Motorail service, and the V/Line sitting carriages (anything with V in the code). These cars were replaced with BHA cars for economy class and SDS for first class. It was also thought that the dining car would be lost, but in the end it was retained. Further, the NAM twinette sleeper cars were replaced with FAM sleepers. The relief expresses were also withdrawn from the timetable, allowing the V/Line coaches to be shifted to broad gauge and used to boost the Victorian country rail network services.

== See also ==
- Intercapital Daylight
- Southern Aurora
- Spirit of Progress
