= HMS Clan Macnaughton =

UK cargo ship and armed merchant cruiser

History

United Kingdom
- Name: Clan Macnaughton
- Namesake: Clan Macnaghten
- Owner: Cayzer, Irvine & Co, Ltd
- Operator: 1914: (United Kingdom) Royal Navy
- Port of registry: 1911: (United Kingdom) Glasgow
- Builder: A Stephen & Sons, Glasgow
- Cost: £66,750
- Yard number: 443
- Launched: 28 June 1911
- Completed: August 1911
- Acquired: for Royal Navy, 19 November 1914
- Refit: as AMC, November – December 1914
- Identification: UK official number 129592; code letters HTGD; 1915: pennant number M81
- Fate: missing, 3 February 1915

General characteristics
- Class & type: Clan Line 430-foot flush-decker
- Tonnage: 4,985 GRT, 3,103 NRT
- Length: 429.8 ft (131.0 m) registered
- Beam: 53.7 ft (16.4 m)
- Depth: 43.6 ft (13.3 m)
- Decks: 3
- Installed power: 1 × triple expansion engine, 4,000 ihp, 497 NHP
- Propulsion: 1 × screw
- Speed: 11 knots (20 km/h)
- Crew: as AMC: 284

HMS Clan Macnaughton was a British cargo steamship. She was built in Glasgow for Clan Line in 1911. Early in the First World War, the Admiralty requisitioned her and had her converted into an armed merchant cruiser (AMC). She disappeared in the North Atlantic in February 1915, with the loss of all 284 men aboard.

She was the first of two Clan Line ships to be named after Clan Macnaghten. The second was a cargo steamship that was built in Scotland in 1921, and sunk by a U-boat in 1942.

== A class of nine sisters ==
Between 1911 and 1913, Cayzer, Irvine & Co (Clan Line) took delivery of a class of nine flush deck cargo ships from a total of six shipbuilders. The first was Clan Macphee, launched in April 1911 by Irvine's Ship Building and Dry Dock Co in West Hartlepool, County Durham. The final member of the class to be built was Clan Macquarrie, launched by Alexander Stephen and Sons in Linthouse, Glasgow in September 1913. Three members of the class, Clan Macrae, Clan Davidson, and Clan Macewen, were refrigerated cargo ships, for trade with Australia.

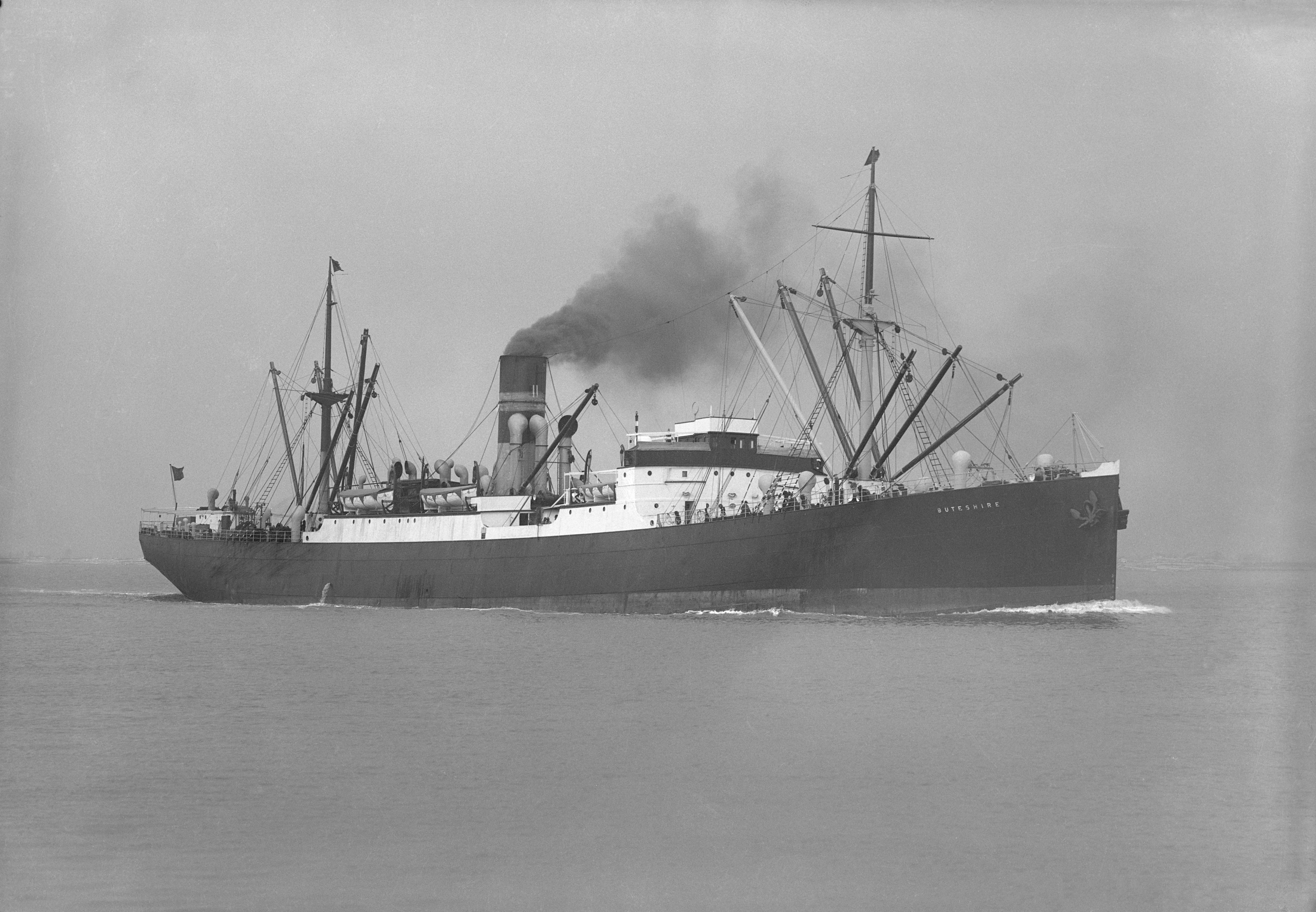
One of Clan Macnaughton's sister ships, Scottish Shire Line's Buteshire. She was built in 1912 as Clan Line's Clan Macewen, and renamed when she was transferred to Scottish Shire Line in 1920.

== Building and registration ==
A Stephen & Sons also built Clan MacNaughton. She was laid down as yard number 443, launched on 28 June 1911, and completed that August. She cost £66,750. Her registered length was 429.8 ft (131.0 m), her beam was 53.7 ft (16.4 m), and her depth was 43.6 ft (13.3 m). She had three decks, and her tonnages were 4,985 GRT and 3,103 NRT. She had a single screw, driven by a three-cylinder triple expansion engine, which was rated at 497 NHP or 4,000 ihp, and gave her a speed of 11 knots (20 km/h).

Cayzer, Irvine registered her at Glasgow. Her UK official number was 129592, and her code letters were HTGD. Throughout her civilian career, her Master was Captain JA Macpherson.

== Armed merchant cruiser ==
On 19 November 1914, the Admiralty requisitioned Clan Macnaughton for conversion into an AMC. She was armed and fitted out as such in London. She was assigned to the 10th Cruiser Squadron, with the pennant number M81.

The 10th Cruiser Squadron was assigned to the Northern Patrol, whose main task was the blockade of Germany. Clan MacNaughton was the slowest ship in the squadron, and one of the smaller ones. Admiral Dudley de Chair assigned her to Patrol "D", which was a flotilla of six ships spread along a line running north-northwest of the island of St Kilda. She was commissioned under the command of Commander Robert Jeffreys, who had previously commanded HMS Grafton.

== Loss ==
Early on 3 February 1915, Clan Macnaughton reported by wireless telegraph that her position was 58°47′N 09°27′W. No further signal was ever received from her. On 9 February HMS Hildebrand, which was a converted Booth Line steamship, reported having seen wreckage: a hatchway cover, a griping spar, a door, battens, and lifebelts. On 15 February, another AMC, HMS Bayano, was patrolling northwest of the Hebrides when she found a ship's grey-painted lifeboat. The boat bore no ship's name, but it was deemed likely to have been from Clan MacNaughton.

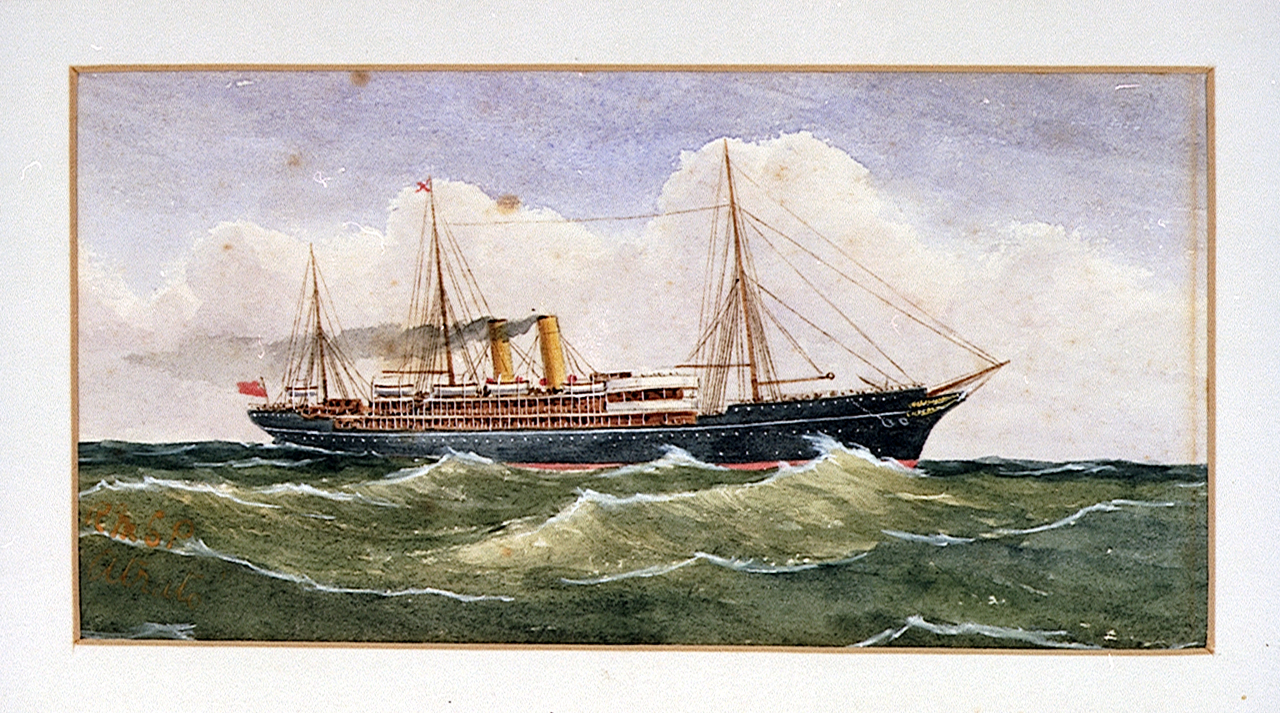
HMS Viknor in her original guise as the RMSP liner RMS Atrato

Clan MacNaughton's wreck has yet to be found, and the cause of her loss has not been established. She could have simply foundered in a gale and heavy sea. However, in October 1914, the German auxiliary cruiser Berlin had laid a field of 200 mines off Tory Island off the northwest coast of County Donegal. Some of those mines had broken loose in heavy seas, and drifted northeast. On 13 January another AMC, HMS Viknor, had been lost with all hands, also suspected to be caused by one of Berlin's mines drifting north.

== Bibliography ==
- Chatterton, E Keble (1934). The Big Blockade. London: Hurst & Blackett.
- Clarkson, John; Fenton, Roy; Munro, Archie (2007). Clan Line Illustrated Fleet History. Preston: Ships in Focus Publications. ISBN 978-1-901703-47-4.
- Lloyd's Register of British and Foreign Shipping. Vol. I.–Sailing Ships, &c. London: Lloyd's Register of Shipping. 1912 – via Internet Archive.
- Lloyd's Register of Shipping. Vol. II.–Steamers. London: Lloyd's Register of Shipping. 1914 – via Internet Archive.
- Mercantile Navy List. London: Registrar General of Shipping and Seamen. 1912 – via Crew List Index Project.

== External link ==
- Kindell, Don. "Wednesday, 3 February 1915". World War 1 Casualty Lists of the Royal Navy and Dominion Navies. Naval-History.net.
