= HMS Bayano (1914) =

British banana boat and armed merchant cruiser

History

United Kingdom
- Name: Bayano
- Namesake: Bayano River
- Owner: Elders & Fyffes
- Operator: 1914: (United Kingdom) Royal Navy
- Port of registry: 1913: (United Kingdom) Glasgow
- Builder: A Stephen & Sons, Glasgow
- Yard number: 453
- Launched: 19 April 1913
- Completed: 1913
- Refit: as AMC, November–December 1914
- Identification: UK official number 133215; code letters JCKN; call sign GMK
- Fate: torpedoed, 11 March 1915

General characteristics
- Type: refrigerated cargo liner
- Tonnage: 5,948 GRT, 3,500 NRT
- Length: 416.6 ft (127.0 m)
- Beam: 53.2 ft (16.2 m)
- Depth: 30.1 ft (9.2 m)
- Decks: 4
- Installed power: 2 × triple expansion engines, 584 NHP
- Propulsion: 2 × screws
- Speed: 14 kn (26 km/h)
- Capacity: 215,000 cu ft (6,088 m^{3}) refrigerated
- Sensors & processing systems: submarine signalling
- Armament: as AMC: 2 × 6 in (150 mm) naval guns

HMS Bayano was a British cargo liner and banana boat. She was built in Glasgow for Elders & Fyffes in 1913. Early in the First World War, the Admiralty requisitioned her and had her converted into an armed merchant cruiser (AMC). A German U-boat sank her by torpedo in the North Channel in 1915, killing 195 members of her crew, 26 crew-members survived.

She was one of at least two Elders & Fyffes ships to have been named after the Bayano River in Panama. The other was built in 1917 and scrapped in 1956.

== Building and registration ==
Alexander Stephen and Sons in Linthouse, Glasgow, built the ship as yard number 453. She was launched on 19 April 1913 as Bayano and completed later that year. She was a slightly enlarged version of Chagres, which A. Stephen and Sons had built for Elders & Fyffes in 1912.

Bayano's registered length was 416.6 ft (127.0 m). Her beam was 53.2 ft (16.2 m) and her depth was 30.1 ft (9.2 m). Of her cargo space, 215,000 cubic feet (6,088 cubic metres) was refrigerated, with a "carbonic anhydride" (carbon dioxide) system made by J & E Hall. Her tonnages were 5,948 GRT and 3,500 NRT.

She had twin screws, each driven by a three-cylinder triple expansion engines. The combined power of her engines was rated at 584 NHP and gave her a speed of 14 knots (26 km/h). She was equipped with wireless telegraphy and submarine signalling.

Elders & Fyffes registered Bayano at Glasgow. Her UK official number was 133215 and her code letters were JCKN. By 1914, her wireless telegraph call sign was GMK.

== Armed merchant cruiser ==
In November 1914, the Admiralty requisitioned five Elders & Fyffes ships for conversion into AMC's, Changuinola and Montagua, that the company had recently bought from Hamburg America Line, the larger and faster Patia and Patuca and Bayano. All five were converted at Avonmouth on the Severn Estuary, and assigned to the 10th Cruiser Squadron. The 10th Cruiser Squadron was assigned to the Northern Patrol, whose main task was the blockade of Germany. Bayano was a member of "C" Patrol, which was a flotilla of five ships spread along a line running north of Shetland. Commander Henry Carr was Bayano's commanding officer. Lieutenant Commander Kenneth Guy, lately of Edgar, was his second in command.

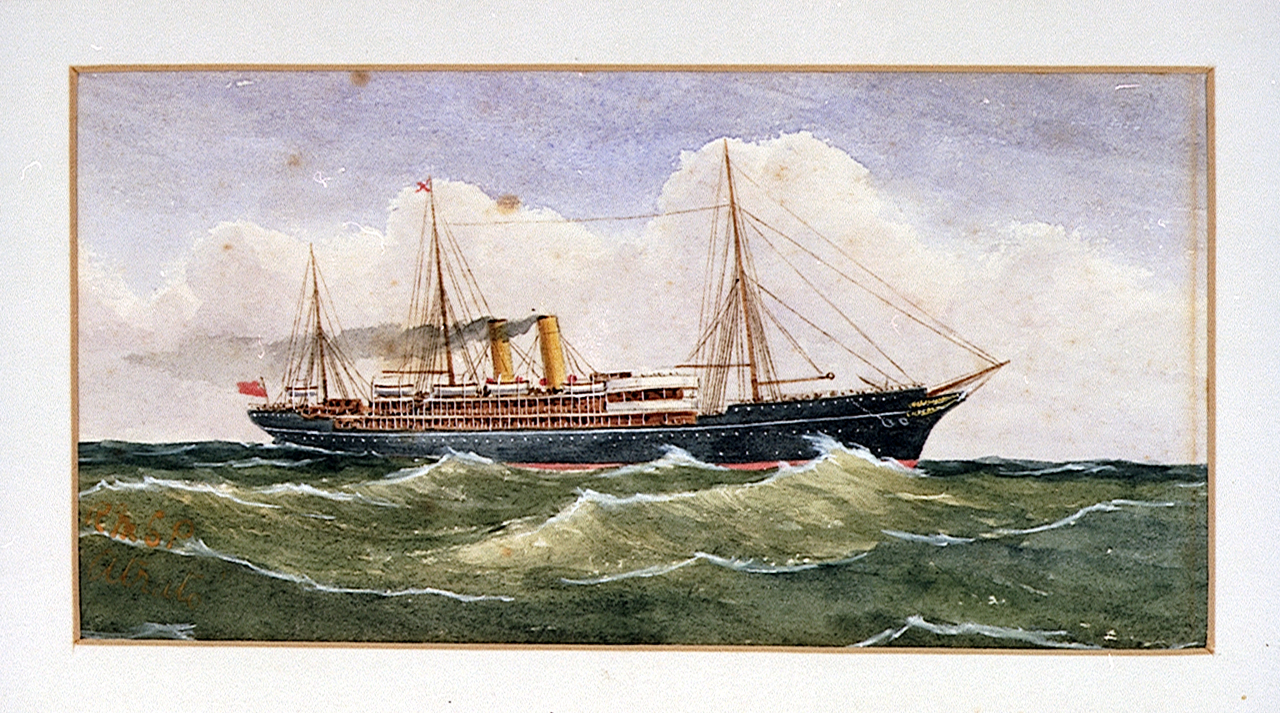
HMS Viknor in her original guise as the RMSP liner RMS Atrato

The 10th Cruiser Squadron used Liverpool or Glasgow for bunkering, victualling and repairs. At the end of January 1915, five members of the Squadron were held in Liverpool for a week, because U-21 had been sighted off Bardsey in Wales, and had then bombarded Barrow-in-Furness. Not until 6 February did the ships leave the River Mersey to return to the north, Admiral Dudley de Chair's flagship HMS Alsatian leading, followed by Caribbean, Bayano, Oropesa and Calyx.

On the same day, the AMC HMS Virginian exploded a mine south of Barra Head in the Outer Hebrides. It was suspected of having drifted from a field of 200 mines that the German auxiliary cruiser Berlin had laid in October 1914 off Tory Island off the north-west coast of County Donegal. Some of the mines had broken loose in heavy seas and drifted north-east. On 7 February, Alsatian sighted a mine in the same area and Bayano, following astern of her, sighted two more. Two other members of the Squadron, Viknor on 13 January 1915 and Clan Macnaughton on 3 February, had disappeared with all hands in the area. It was suspected that Berlin's mines drifting north could have caused both sinkings. On 15 February, Bayano was patrolling north-west of the Hebrides when she found a ship's grey-painted lifeboat. The boat bore no ship's name, but it was thought likely to have been from Clan MacNaughton.

== Loss ==
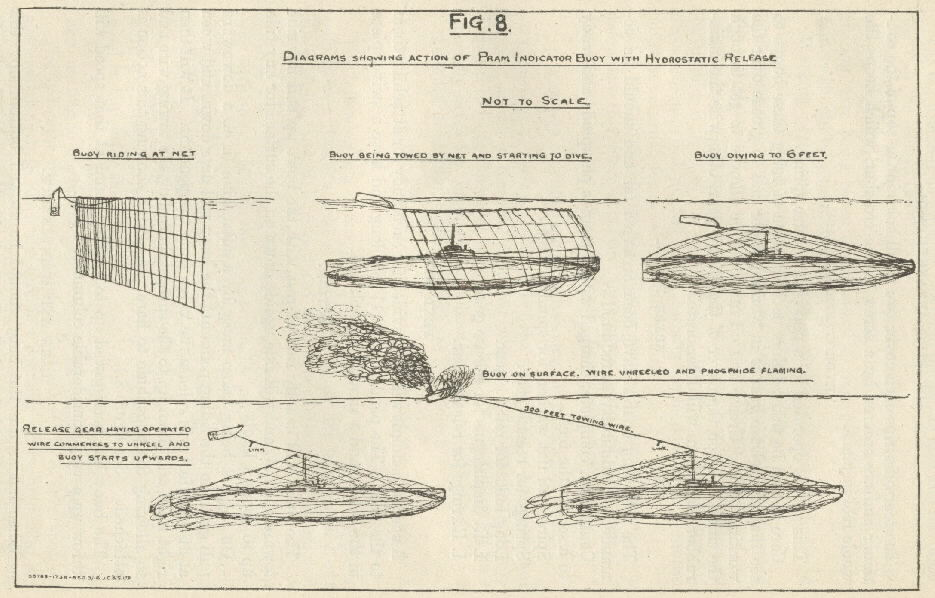
A diagram of the operation of an indicator net.

The Admiralty had begun to use experimental indicator nets to counter German submarines. They were made from strong thin wire, draped from the surface of the sea and buoyed with kapok, small buoys or glass spheres. Sections of the net were held together with clips which were designed to part if a submerged submarine hit the section. The net was to wrap around the vessel and indicate its presence via a buoy being towed along the sea surface. The Admiralty established 21 net barrages, one of which was in the North Channel. The secret project had been under way for some time and apparatus had been designed to run out the nets quickly. Flotillas of net drifters were to operate the nets, protected by armed yachts and other ships with guns and explosive sweeps. By 13 February 1915, nets had been laid across the Dover Straits and other drifter flotillas were ready for the North Channel and St George's Channel.

On 11 March 1915, Bayano was under way to or from Liverpool for bunkering. She proceeded at reduced speed to avoid passing the North Channel net line in the dark. U-27 was waiting in the channel, surfaced, but invisible because it was such a dark night. The U-boat fired a torpedo, which hit Bayano amidships, sinking her in four or five minutes. Her position is variously given as 3 nautical miles (5.6 km; 3.5 mi) off Corsewall Lighthouse, Galloway, or about 10 nautical miles (19 km; 12 mi) southeast by east of Corsewall Point. Most of her crew was asleep and went down with her. Commander Carr was on her bridge. Guy said that Carr stood without fear, waving goodbye, and shouting "Good luck to you boys" as the ship sank. Bayano's dead included 21 Royal Marines and 12 members the Newfoundland Royal Naval Reserve.

== Aftermath ==
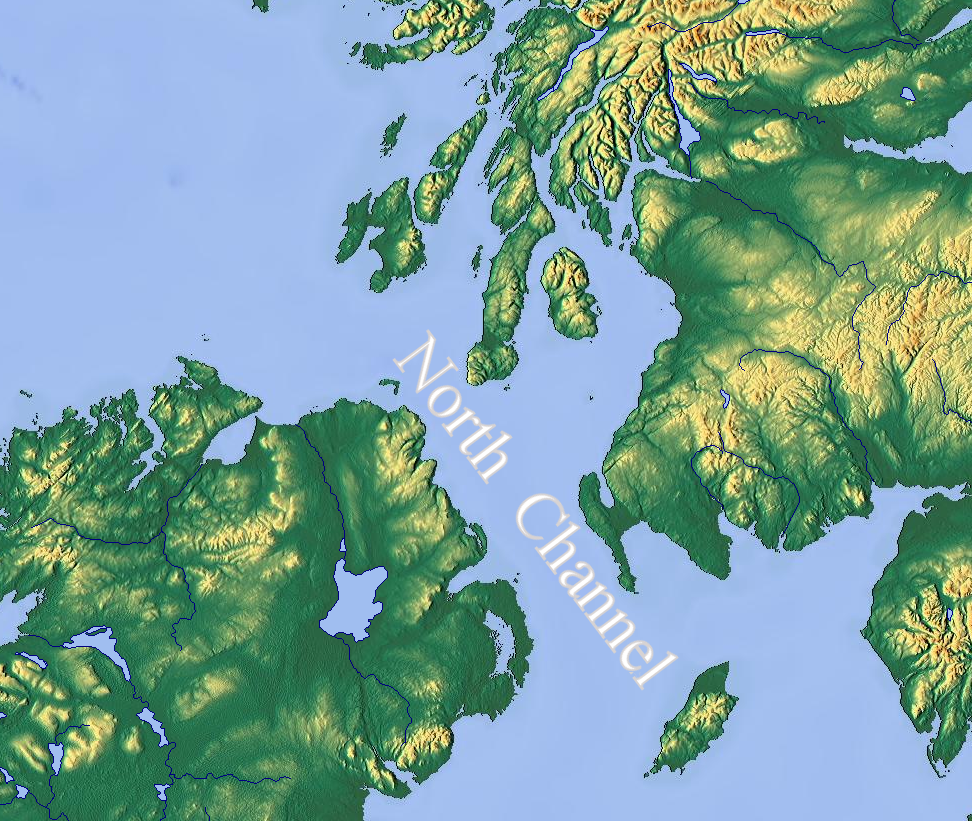
The North Channel

The auxiliary cruiser HMS Tara rescued Guy, along with seven other officers and men. The coaster Balmarino rescued 18 petty officers and ratings. The next morning, the coaster Castlereagh found only floating wreckage and the corpses of dead crewmen in their lifejackets. Castlereagh's Master, Captain McGarrick, slowed his ship to search for survivors, but U-27 was still in the vicinity, and tried to close on the coaster. Castlereagh escaped after the U-boat chased her for twenty minutes.

Eight crew members have Commonwealth War Graves. Two washed ashore on the Isle of Man, where thousands of Manx people joined a funeral procession for them. Both men are buried in Douglas. Three are buried in County Down, two at Ballyphilip and one at Whitechurch, near Ballywalter. One is buried at Larne in County Antrim. Two are buried in Hampshire, one at Eastleigh and the other in Gosport. Those who have no known grave are commemorated on Chatham Naval Memorial or Portsmouth Naval Memorial.

On 12 October 2025, divers found Bayano's wreck and surveyed it with side-scan sonar. It is at a depth of 106 m (348 ft) at position 55°3.0348′N 05°26.0976′W.

== Bibliography ==
- Chatterton, E. Keble (1934). The Big Blockade. London: Hurst & Blackett. OCLC 869760719.
- Corbett, J. S. (2009) [1929]. Naval Operations. History of the Great War Based on Official Documents by Direction of the Historical Section of the Committee of Imperial Defence. Vol. II (Pbk. repr. Naval & Military Press in association with the Imperial War Museum Department of Printed Books, Uckfield ed.). London: Longmans Green & Co. ISBN 978-1-84342-490-1.
- Corkill, Adrian (2013). Hostile Sea: The U-boat Offensive around the Isle of Man during World War One. Port Erin: Selbstverl. ISBN 978-0-9540115-2-9.
- Dunn, Steve (2016). Blockade: Cruiser Warfare and the Starvation of Germany in World War One. Barnsley: Seaforth (Pen & Sword Books). ISBN 978-1-84832-340-7.
- Hadley, Michael L.; Crickard, Fred W. (1996). Nation's Navy: In Quest of Canadian Naval Identity. Montreal: McGill-Queen's University Press. ISBN 978-0-7735-1506-2 – via Archive Foundation.
- Lloyd's Register of Shipping–Sailing Vessels, Owners, &c. Vol. I. London: Lloyd's Register of Shipping. 1914 – via Internet Archive.
- Lloyd's Register of Shipping–Steamers. Vol. II. London: Lloyd's Register of Shipping. 1914 – via Internet Archive.
- The Year Book of Wireless Telegraphy and Telephony. London: The Marconi Press Agency Ltd. 1914. OCLC 933313232.
- Mercantile Navy List. London: Registrar General of Shipping and Seamen. 1914 – via Crew List Index Project.
- Smith, Caroline (2015). Isle of Man in the Great War. Barnsley: Pen and Sword Books. ISBN 978-1-78383-122-7.
