= RMS Magdalena (1889) =

British Royal Mail Ship that became a troop ship in the First World War

History

United Kingdom
- Name: Magdalena
- Namesake: Magdalena River in Colombia
- Owner: RMSP Co
- Operator: 1915: (United Kingdom) Royal Navy
- Port of registry: (United Kingdom) London
- Route: Southampton – Brazil – Uruguay – Argentina (1889–1905); Southampton – Caribbean (1905–15)
- Builder: Robert Napier and Sons, Govan
- Yard number: 417
- Launched: 2 May 1889
- Completed: June 1889
- Maiden voyage: 2 August 1889
- Identification: UK official number 96612; code letters LGMT; 1913: call sign UND
- Fate: Scrapped 1923

General characteristics
- Type: ocean Liner (1889–1915); troop ship (1915–20)
- Tonnage: 5,140 GRT, 2,865 NRT
- Length: 421.2 ft (128.4 m)
- Beam: 50.0 ft (15.2 m)
- Depth: 25.4 ft (7.7 m)
- Decks: 3
- Installed power: 687 NHP
- Propulsion: 1 × triple expansion engine; 1 × screw
- Sail plan: 3-masted schooner
- Speed: 15 knots (28 km/h)
- Capacity: Passengers: 170 1st class; 40 2nd class; 330 3rd class
- Sensors & processing systems: by 1910: submarine signalling
- Armament: as troop ship: 2 × naval guns
- Notes: sister ships: Atrato, Thames, Clyde

RMS Magdalena was a British steamship that was built in 1889 as a Royal Mail Ship and ocean liner for the Royal Mail Steam Packet Company. In the First World War she served as the troop ship HMT Magdalena. After a long and successful civilian and military career she was scrapped in 1923.

== Building ==
In the 1880s RMSP introduced a series of larger new ships to improve its scheduled services between Southampton, South America and the Caribbean. The first was the 4,572 GRT Orinoco, built by Caird and Company and launched in 1886. She was RMSP's first new ship to have a hull of steel rather than iron.

After Orinoco's success, RMSP ordered two more ships to an improved and enlarged version of the design from Robert Napier and Sons of Govan. Atrato was launched in 1888, followed by Magdalena launched on 2 May 1889. Before these were completed RMSP ordered two more from Napier: the slightly larger Thames in 1889 and Clyde launched in 1890.

Orinoco had only a small amount of deck housing and was the last square-rigged sail-steamer to be built for RMSP. The Napier ships were more modern, each with a full superstructure deck and rigged as a three-masted schooner. The smaller sail plan was based on the increasing economy and reliability of their engines. Atrato had berths for 540 passengers: 170 in first class, 40 in second class and 330 in third class.

Magdalena had a three-cylinder triple expansion steam engine that was rated at 687 NHP. It drove a single screw and gave her a speed of 15 knots (28 km/h).

Like her sister Atrato, the ship was named after a river in Colombia. The Magdalena River flows into the Caribbean near the border with Panama. RMSP registered Magdalena in London. Her UK official number was 96612 and her code letters were LGMT.

== Civilian service ==
Magdalena's maiden voyage on 2 August 1889 was a charter by the Lord Mayor and Corporation of the City of London in which they attended the Royal Naval Review at Spithead. The review was held by Queen Victoria to honour her grandson, Kaiser Wilhelm II. Magdalena was the only merchant ship that took part in the procession. In September 1889 Magdalena joined RMSP's regular scheduled route between Southampton and the east coast of South America.

The five ships' furnaces suffered from heat damage, so in 1891 they were lined with zinc. In 1899 Day, Summers and Company of Southampton raised the boats on Atrato, Magdalena, Thames and Clyde "to a boat deck clear of the promenade" at a cost of more than £5,000. In 1903 Atrato, Magdalena and Clyde were fitted with bronze propellers costing another £5,000. That December the cabins-de-luxe on Magdalena, Thames and Clyde were refurbished and the ladies' saloon on each ship was converted into more cabins.

There were occasional incidents in Magdalena's career. In 1894 she was at anchor in Bahia when she was "fired at". On New Year's Eve 1904 in Montevideo she collided with the Norwegian barque Ilos.

Just after the turn of the 20th century Magdalena and her sisters had their hulls painted white, perhaps to reflect more heat in warmer latitudes. This was short-lived as the new colour showed any grime, rust and soot, and white paint was three times the price of black. In 1902 RMSP reversed the policy and the ships were returned to their original colours.

In 1909 the RMSP liner Trent grounded on a sandbank in the Caribbean and Magdalena tried unsuccessfully to tow her clear. The following year Magdalena grounded on the same bank.

By 1910 Magdalena was equipped for submarine signalling and wireless telegraphy. The Marconi Company supplied and operated her wireless equipment. By 1913 her wireless call sign was UND.

On 12 June 1912, while en route to Barbados, Magdalena went to the aid of a barque that had been becalmed; her crew had been living on a single biscuit per man per day for 40 days. At the end of 1912 Magdalena took the England Cricket Team on a successful tour of the West Indies.

== War service ==
When the United Kingdom entered the First World War in August 1914 Magdalena was 25 years old and near the end of her useful life. However, on 16 December 1915 the Admiralty requisitioned her as the troop ship HMT Magdalena. She was armed with two guns, manned by Royal Navy gun crews.

Magdalena brought Australian troops across the Mediterranean and bringing West India Regiment troops to Europe. An influenza outbreak on board in January 1917 forced the ship into quarantine. In August 1918 Magdalena brought the Gold Coast Regiment home at the close of the East African Campaign.

In Gibraltar in January 1917 Magdalena's armament was augmented with 45 boxes of type "E" smoke canisters, designed to create a smoke screen in the event of enemy attack. On 29 May 1918 the ship was berthed at Suez when the canisters caught fire. The fire took hold on the port side of the ship, and fire floats came alongside and eventually brought the fire under control.

RMSP claimed £12,475 compensation but the Admiralty contested liability. In 1921 the company concluded that it could not win, and reluctantly discontinued its claim.

== Disposal ==
Magdalena was the last of the sisters to survive. The Government returned her to her owners in 1920, who laid her up. Late in 1921 RMSP sold her to shipbreakers in Birkenhead for £1 8s 5d per ton. She was scrapped in the final quarter of 1923.

== Bibliography ==
- Clifford, Hugh (1920). Gold Coast Regiment In The East African Campaign. London: John Murray – via Internet Archive.
- Haws, Duncan (1982). Royal Mail & Nelson Lines. Merchant Fleets. Vol. 5. Crowborough: Travel Creatours Ltd Publications. ISBN 0-946378-00-2.
- Lloyd's Register of British and Foreign Shipping. Vol. I.—Steamers. London: Lloyd's Register of Shipping. 1891 – via Internet Archive.
- Lloyd's Register of British and Foreign Shipping. Vol. I.—Steamers. London: Lloyd's Register of Shipping. 1910 – via Internet Archive.
- The Marconi Press Agency Ltd (1913). The Year Book of Wireless Telegraphy and Telephony. London: The St Katherine Press.
- Mercantile Navy List. London. 1890 – via Crew List Index Project.
- Nicol, Stuart (2001a). MacQueen's Legacy; A History of the Royal Mail Line. Vol. One. Brimscombe Port and Charleston, SC: Tempus Publishing. ISBN 0-7524-2118-2.
- Nicol, Stuart (2001b). MacQueen's Legacy; Ships of the Royal Mail Line. Vol. Two. Brimscombe Port and Charleston, SC: Tempus Publishing. ISBN 0-7524-2119-0.
