= Twinette =

Oceanian term for type of sleeping car

External image
- via The Sydney Morning Herald
- Photo of twinette inside an Australian train, circa 1962

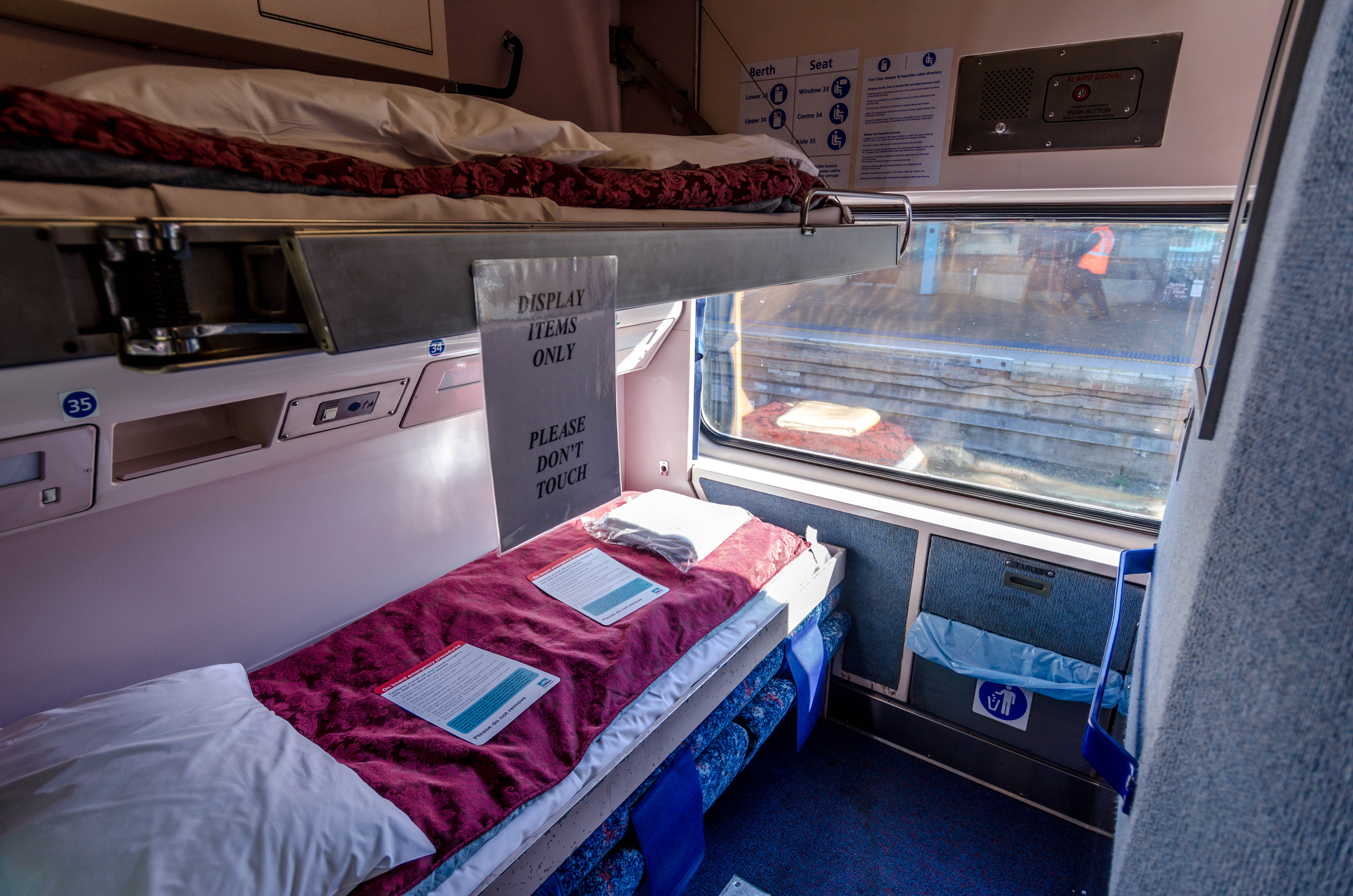
Sleeping berths onboard a NSW TrainLink XPT

A twinette is a sleeping-berth compartment with two beds on a train. The term "twinette" is in common use in Australia and New Zealand (unlike "roomette", which originated in North America and is more widespread); thus the double-berth compartments described here are those found in trains in Australia or New Zealand.

The width of each twinette compartment is typically almost as great as the width of the sleeping car it is in, with a corridor (occupying the remaining width) running down one side of the car. The number of twinettes in a sleeping car can vary slightly, but it is commonly 8, 9, or 10.

The two beds in a twinette are one on top of the other in double-bunk arrangement, and both fold into the front or rear wall of the compartment when not in use, and two seats fold into position in the same area as the berths. Thus the beds are perpendicular to the side of the train, in contrast to roomette berths, which are parallel to it.

Twinettes often have their own shower, toilet, sink, mirrors, chilled-water fountain, wardrobes and a picture window. Occasionally twinettes are about the size of a roomette, with both bunks, one on top of the other, filling most of the floor space of the compartment, replacing two seats facing each other. In this case, the overall floor-plan of the sleeping car is similar to roomettes, not the twinettes described earlier, which are more commonly found only in first class. This much more cramped arrangement is more likely to be found in economy-class sleepers on very long-distance trains requiring more than one night's travel. These twinettes do not have their own shower or toilet, and passengers use a communal shower and toilet at the end of the car.

== See also ==
- Roomette
- Sleeping car
