= RMS Orinoco =

British ocean liner

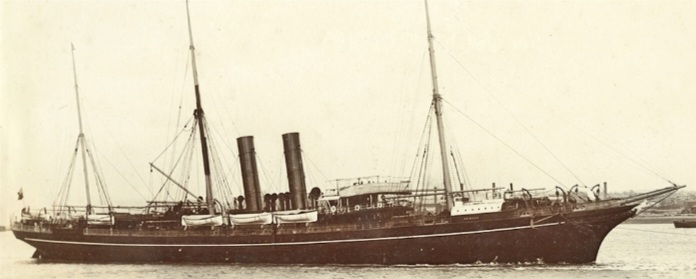

History

United Kingdom
- Name: Orinoco
- Namesake: Orinoco
- Owner: Royal Mail Steam Packet Co
- Port of registry: London
- Route: Southampton – Caribbean
- Builder: Caird & Company, Greenock
- Yard number: 244
- Launched: 13 September 1886
- Identification: UK official number 91972; code letters KJFD
- Fate: Scrapped 1909

General characteristics
- Type: Ocean liner
- Tonnage: 4,478 GRT, 2,393 NRT
- Length: 409.7 ft (124.9 m)
- Beam: 45.0 ft (13.7 m)
- Depth: 33.4 ft (10.2 m)
- Decks: 3
- Installed power: 870 NHP, 5,800 ihp
- Propulsion: triple expansion engine
- Sail plan: 3 masts; 1886: square rig; 1891: schooner
- Speed: 14 1/2 knots (26.9 km/h)
- Capacity: passengers: 1st class: 257; 2nd class: 26

RMS Orinoco was a British Royal Mail Ship that was built in Scotland in 1886 and scrapped, also in Scotland, in 1909. She spent her entire career with the Royal Mail Steam Packet Company (RMSP), mainly trading between England and the Caribbean.

Orinoco was the first RMSP ship to have a steel hull, and the first to be propelled by a triple expansion engine. She was the last square rigger to be built for RMSP. After Orinoco, RMSP continued to order new ships equipped with both sail and steam propulsion, but they were all schooners. She was also the last passenger ship to be built for RMSP with a largely flush deck, and little superstructure except for her bridge and some small deckhouses.

Orinoco had no sister ships. However, her design heavily influenced RMSP's next four large liners: Atrato (1888), Magdalena (1889), Thames (1889) and Clyde (1890).

== Building ==
Caird & Company built Orinoco at as yard number 244 Greenock on the Firth of Clyde. She had a clipper bow and counter stern. Her registered length was 409.7 ft (124.9 m), her beam was 45.0 ft (13.7 m) and her depth was 33.4 ft (10.2 m). She had berths for 257 passengers in first class and 26 in second class. As built, her tonnages were assessed as 4,478 GRT and 2,393 NRT.

Caird's first attempt to launch Orinoco failed, as she stuck on the slipway. The grease and soap used to lubricate the slipway had hardened, and had to be replaced before she was successfully launched on 13 September 1886.

Orinoco's three-cylinder triple-expansion engine was rated at 870 NHP and 5,800 ihp. It drove a single screw, and gave her a speed of 14 1/2 knots (26.9 km/h). She had two funnels. From new she had electric lighting, which was supplied by Siemens.

Orinoco's hull had ten watertight bulkheads, and was designed to meet the standards for an armed merchant cruiser, for which the UK Government would pay a subvention. However, in April 1888 the Admiralty deemed that she her engine was not powerful enough, and she lacked enough capacity for armament, for the subvention to be paid for her.

On 18 November RMSP registered Orinoco at London. Her UK official number was 91972 and her code letters were KJFD.

== Career ==
Orinoco's usual route was between Southampton and ports in the Caribbean. She seldom used her sails, so in 1891 her spars were removed and she was re-rigged as a schooner. In 1902 her sails were removed altogether. In May 1905 RMSP decided to equip her with a refrigeration plant to carry fresh fruit.

== Collisions ==
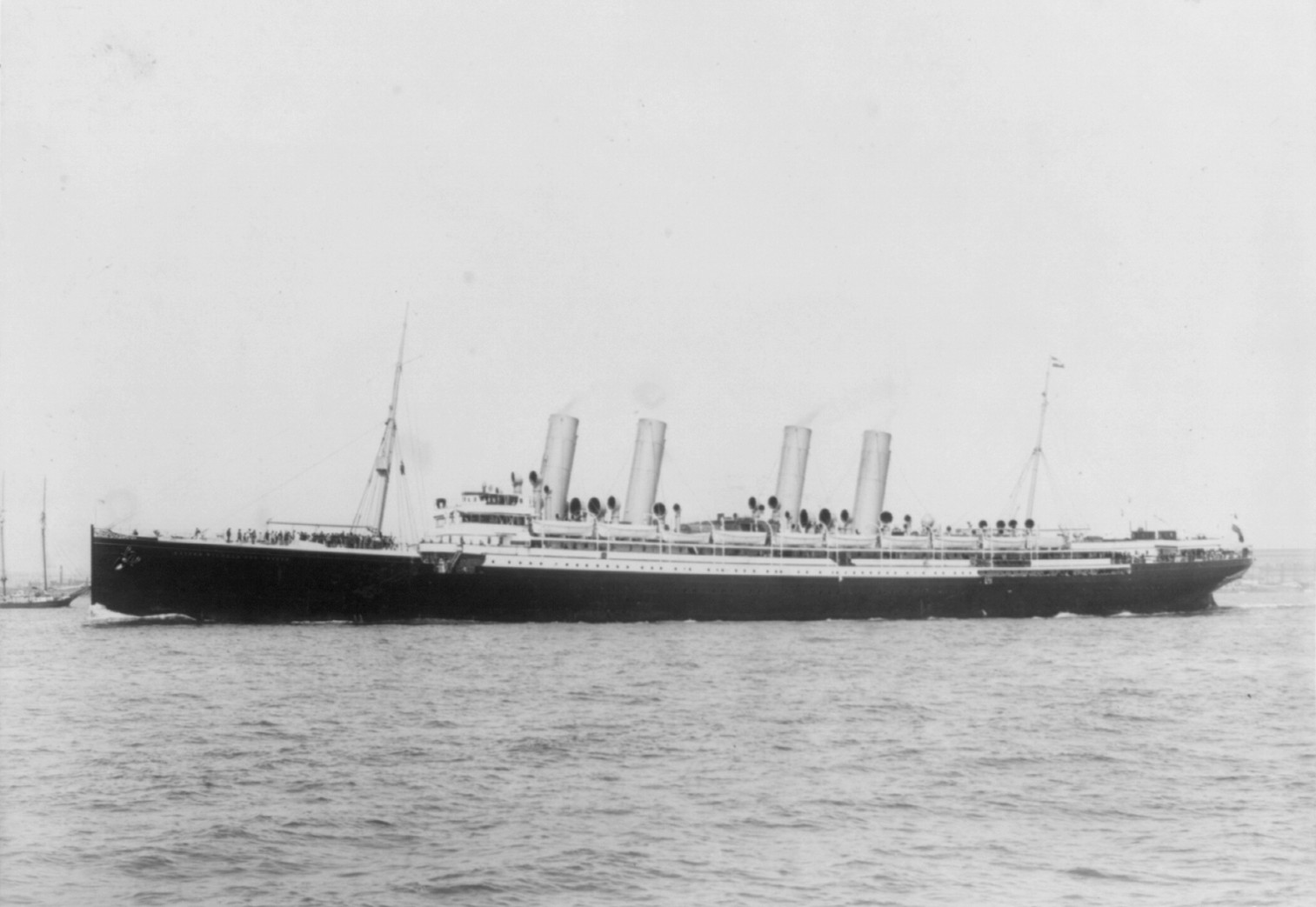
Kaiser Wilhelm der Grosse, with which Orinoco collided in 1906

In 1903 Orinoco collided with a sailing vessel, Hawthornbrook. On 21 November 1906 in Cherbourg Harbour she collided in fog with the Norddeutscher Lloyd transatlantic ocean liner Kaiser Wilhelm der Grosse. Orinoco's clipper bow penetrated Kaiser Wilhelm der Grosse's starboard side, killing four people aboard the German ship and at least one on Orinoco. A court of inquiry found Kaiser Wilhelm der Grosse wholly responsible for the collision, exonerating Orinoco and her Master, Captain Thomas Pearce.

== Scrapping and fire ==
In 1909 the tug Oceana towed Orinoco from Southampton to Bo'ness on the Firth of Forth, where she arrived on 5 November. She was beached on 13 November, and Forth Shipbreakers started to scrap her. On 30 June 1910 the part-demolished ship caught fire and was seriously damaged.

== Bibliography ==
- Haws, Duncan (1982). Royal Mail & Nelson Lines. Merchant Fleets. Vol. 5. Crowborough: Travel Creatours Ltd Publications. ISBN 0-946378-00-2.
- Lloyd's Register of British and Foreign Shipping. London: Lloyd's Register of Shipping. 1887 – via Internet Archive.
- Mercantile Navy List. London. 1887 – via Crew List Index Project.
- Nicol, Stuart (2001a). MacQueen's Legacy; A History of the Royal Mail Line. Vol. One. Brimscombe Port and Charleston, SC: Tempus Publishing. ISBN 0-7524-2118-2.
- Nicol, Stuart (2001b). MacQueen's Legacy; Ships of the Royal Mail Line. Vol. Two. Brimscombe Port and Charleston, SC: Tempus Publishing. ISBN 0-7524-2119-0.
