= RMS Atrato (1888) =

British Royal Mail Ship that became an armed merchant cruiser and was lost with all hands

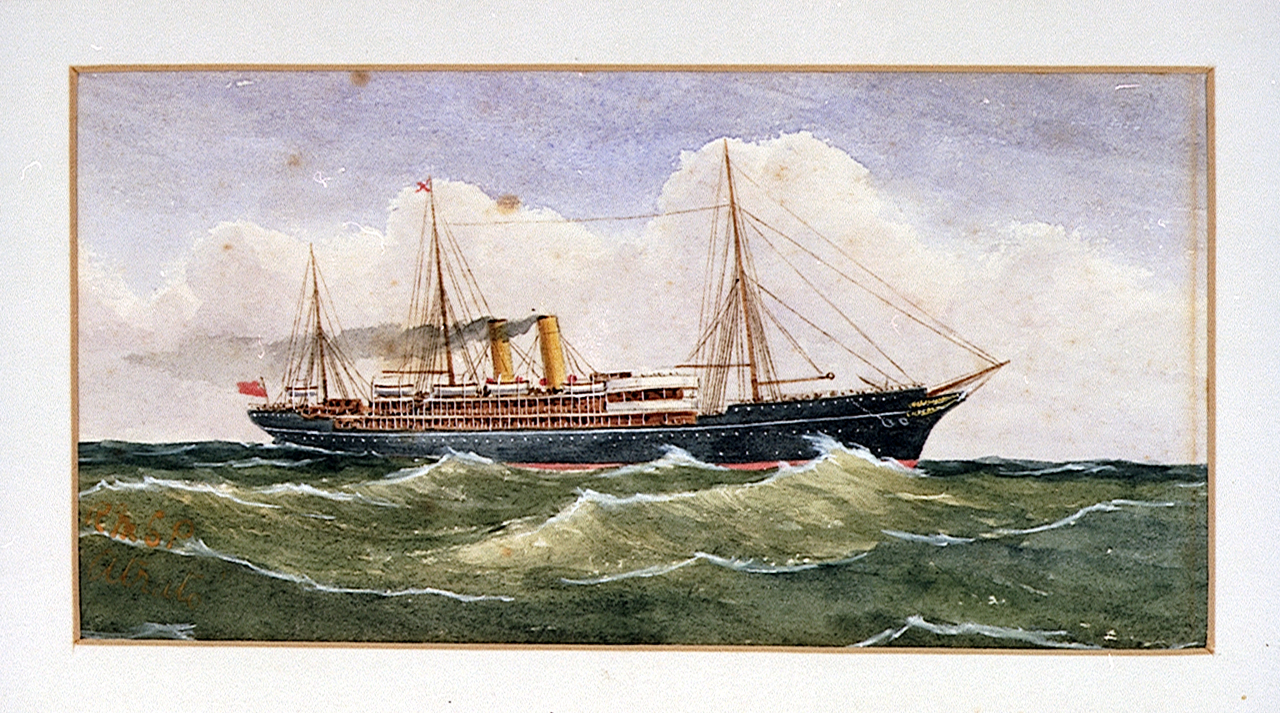
- An artist's impression of Atrato

History

United Kingdom
- Name: 1888: Atrato; 1912: The Viking; 1914: HMS Viknor
- Namesake: Atrato River in Colombia
- Owner: 1888: RMSP Co; 1912: Viking Cruising Co
- Operator: 1914: (United Kingdom) Royal Navy
- Port of registry: (United Kingdom) London
- Route: Southampton – Brazil – Uruguay – Argentina (1889), Southampton – Caribbean (1889–1912)
- Builder: Robert Napier and Sons, Govan
- Yard number: 410
- Launched: 22 September 1888
- Maiden voyage: 17 January 1889
- Identification: UK official number 95512; code letters KWSH; 1913: call sign MVK
- Fate: Sunk 13 January 1915

General characteristics
- Type: 1889: ocean liner; 1912: cruise ship; 1914: armed merchant cruiser
- Tonnage: 5,347 GRT, 3,069 NRT
- Length: 421.2 ft (128.4 m)
- Beam: 50.0 ft (15.2 m)
- Draught: 25.0 ft (7.6 m)
- Depth: 33 ft 4 in (10.16 m)
- Decks: 3
- Installed power: 687 NHP
- Propulsion: 1 × triple expansion engine; 1 × screw
- Sail plan: 3-masted schooner
- Speed: 14 knots (26 km/h) service; 16 knots (30 km/h) maximum
- Boats & landing craft carried: 5 × 30-foot (9.1 m) lifeboats; 2 × 28-foot (8.5 m) cutters; 1 × 28-foot (8.5 m) steam launch; 1 × 25-foot (7.6 m) gig; 1 × 18-foot (5.5 m) dinghy
- Capacity: Passengers: 176 1st class; 42 2nd class; nearly 400 steerage; Cargo 2,524 tons
- Complement: as armed merchant cruiser: 22 officers, 273 ratings
- Sensors & processing systems: by 1910: submarine signalling
- Notes: sister ships: Magdalena, Thames, Clyde

RMS Atrato was a UK steamship that was built in 1888 as a Royal Mail Ship and ocean liner for the Royal Mail Steam Packet Company. In 1912 she was sold and became the cruise ship The Viking. Late in 1914 she was requisitioned and converted into the armed merchant cruiser HMS Viknor. She sank in 1915 with all hands, a total of 295 Royal Navy officers and men.

== Building ==
In the 1880s RMSP introduced a series of larger new ships to improve its scheduled services between Southampton, South America and the Caribbean. The first was the 4,572 GRT Orinoco, built by Caird and Company and launched in 1886. She was RMSP's first new ship to have a hull of steel rather than iron.

After Orinoco's success RMSP ordered two more ships to an improved and enlarged version of the design from Robert Napier and Sons of Govan. Atrato was launched on 22 September 1888, followed by Magdalena, which was launched in 1889. Before these were completed RMSP ordered two more from Napier: the slightly larger Thames in 1889 and Clyde launched in 1890.

Atrato's registered length was 421.2 ft (128.4 m), her beam was 50.0 ft (15.2 m) and her depth was 33 ft 4 in (10.16 m). Her tonnages were 5,347 GRT and 3,069 NRT.

Orinoco had only a small amount of deck housing, and was the last square-rigged sail-steamer to be built for RMSP. The four Napier-built ships were more modern, each with a full superstructure deck and rigged as a three-masted schooner. Atrato was the first RMSP ship to be built without yards. The smaller sail plan was based on the increasing economy and reliability of their engines.

Atrato's boilers had a working pressure of 150 lb_{f}/in^{2}. She had eight of them, supplying steam to one three-cylinder triple expansion steam engine that was rated at 687 NHP and drove a single screw. This gave her a top speed of 16 knots (30 km/h) on trials and a service speed of 14 knots (26 km/h).

Atrato was designed to meet the standards for an armed merchant cruiser, for which the UK Government would pay a subvention. However, in April 1888, before she had been launched, the Admiralty deemed that she her engine was not powerful enough, and she lacked enough capacity for armament, for the subvention to be paid for her.

Atrato had berths for 176 passengers in first class staterooms, 42 people in second class, and nearly 400 emigrants in steerage class. Her cargo capacity was 2,524 tons and her coal bunkers 1,109 tons. She had 6,000 cubic feet (170 m^{3}) of refrigerated storage space for provisions, using a dry-air refrigeration system with a discharge rate of 10,000 cubic feet (280 m^{3}) of air per hour. She had tanks for 20,000 imperial gallons (91,000 litres) of fresh water.

Atrato was launched on 22 September 1888, named after the Atrato River in Colombia. RMSP named all of its ships after rivers; many of them with Hispanic names to reflect its trade with Latin America. RMSP registered her in London. Her UK official number was 95512 and her code letters were KWSH.

== Civilian service ==
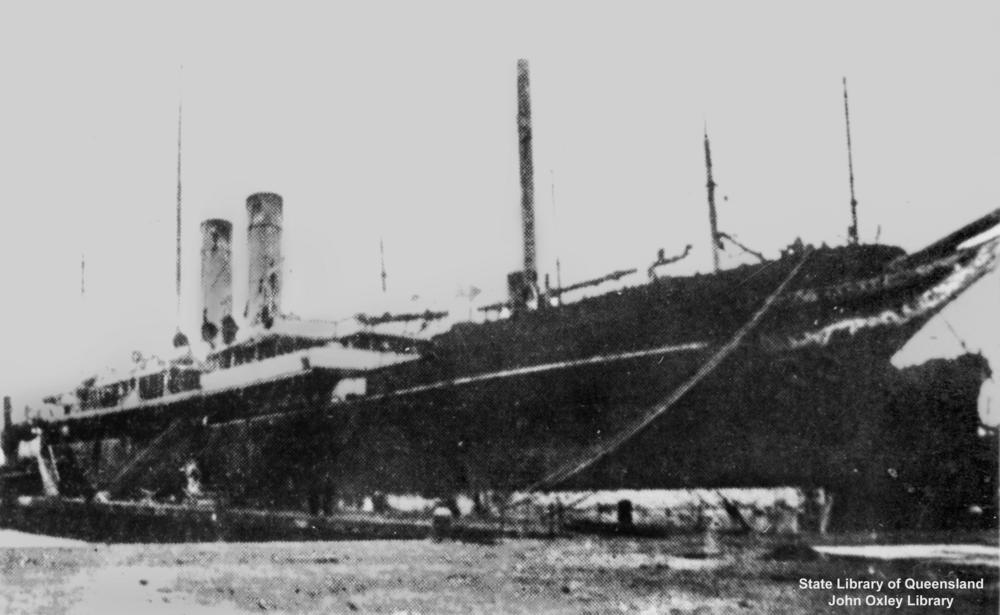
Atrato in civilian service

Atrato's maiden voyage began from Southampton on 17 January 1889. As well as her passengers, mails and a full cargo she carried in her strong room £120,000 in sovereigns, jewellery worth £2,000 and silver bars worth £400. She called at Carril, Vigo and Lisbon, and then crossed the Atlantic to South America. There she worked her way down the east coast, calling at Pernambuco, Maceió, Bahia, Rio de Janeiro, Santos, Montevideo and Buenos Aires. Magdalena, Thames and Clyde joined the same South American route over the next 18 months, but after her maiden voyage Atrato was switched to join Orinoco on RMSP's Caribbean route. All five ships had long and successful careers.

The five ships' furnaces suffered from heat damage, so in 1891 they were lined with zinc. In 1899 Day, Summers and Company of Southampton raised the boats on Atrato, Magdalena, Thames and Clyde "to a boat deck clear of the promenade" at a cost of more than £5,000. In 1903 Atrato, Magdalena and Clyde were fitted with bronze propellers costing another £5,000. In 1901 Atrato's hull was painted white. This was short-lived as the new colour showed any grime, rust and soot, and white paint was three times the price of black. In 1902 RMSP reversed the policy and the ship was returned to her original colour. In May 1905 RMSP ordered insulation and refrigeration to be fitted to part of their cargo space to enable Orinoco and Atrato to carry fresh fruit.

By 1910 Atrato was equipped for submarine signalling and wireless telegraphy. The Marconi Company supplied and operated her wireless equipment.

In October 1912 the Viking Cruising Company of London bought Atrato and renamed her The Viking. She became a cruise ship, touring the waters of northern Europe. By 1913 her wireless call sign was MVK.

== Naval service and loss ==
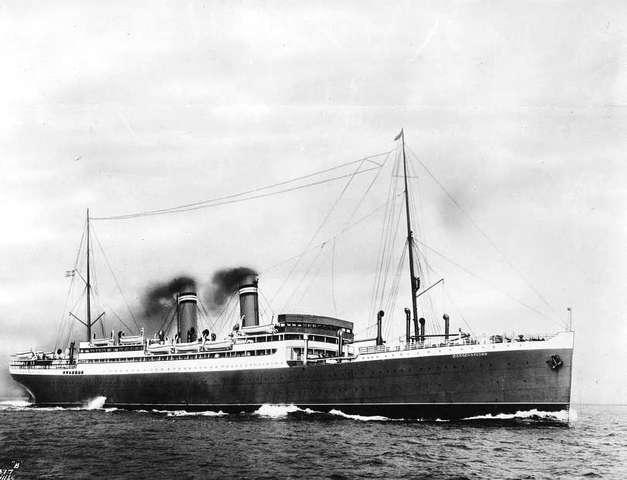
The Norwegian liner Bergensfjord, which Viknor detained in 1915

Despite having rejected Atrato as an armed merchant cruiser in 1888, the Admiralty requisitioned her after the UK entered the First World War in 1914. She was fitted out, armed, and commissioned as HMS Viknor. She was placed under the command of Commander EO Ballantyne with a complement of 22 officers and 273 ratings and assigned to the 10th Cruiser Squadron.

On 28 December 1914 Viknor went on patrol from the River Tyne, and on 1 January she joined "B" patrol off the north coast of Scotland. The patrol was ordered to find and stop the neutral Norwegian America Line ship Bergensfjord, which the UK Government believed was carrying a suspected German spy. Viknor found Bergensfjord, detained her and escorted her to Kirkwall in Orkney. There the suspect and a number of other prisoners were transferred to Viknor, which then left for Liverpool.

Viknor never reached her destination. On 13 January 1915 she sank with all hands in heavy seas off Tory Island, County Donegal, Ireland. She sent no distress signal. Some wreckage and many corpses washed ashore on the northern coast of Ireland.

It is thought she struck a German naval mine, possibly one of those laid by the German auxiliary cruiser Berlin. Her wreck was found in 2006, and in 2011 a scuba diver placed a White Ensign on it in memory of her complement.

== Bibliography ==
- Haws, Duncan (1982). Royal Mail & Nelson Lines. Merchant Fleets. Vol. 5. Crowborough: Travel Creatours Ltd Publications. ISBN 0-946378-00-2.
- Lloyd's Register of British and Foreign Shipping. Vol. I.—Steamers. London: Lloyd's Register of Shipping. 1910 – via Internet Archive.
- The Marconi Press Agency Ltd (1913). The Year Book of Wireless Telegraphy and Telephony. London: The St Katherine Press.
- Mercantile Navy List. London. 1890 – via Crew List Index Project.
- Monograph No. 19: The Tenth Cruiser Squadron (PDF). Naval Staff Monographs (Historical). Vol. VII. Naval Staff, Training and Staff Duties Division. 1922. pp. 5–66.
- Nicol, Stuart (2001a). MacQueen's Legacy; A History of the Royal Mail Line. Vol. 1. Brimscombe Port and Charleston, SC: Tempus Publishing. ISBN 0-7524-2118-2.
- Nicol, Stuart (2001b). MacQueen's Legacy; Ships of the Royal Mail Line. Vol. 2. Brimscombe Port and Charleston, SC: Tempus Publishing. ISBN 0-7524-2119-0.
- Osborne, Richard; Spong, Harry & Grover, Tom (2007). Armed Merchant Cruisers 1878–1945. Windsor: World Warship Society. ISBN 978-0-9543310-8-5.
- Universal Register. London: Lloyd's Register of British and Foreign Shipping. 1889 – via Internet Archive.
