= First class travel =

Luxury seating and service on a passenger transport system

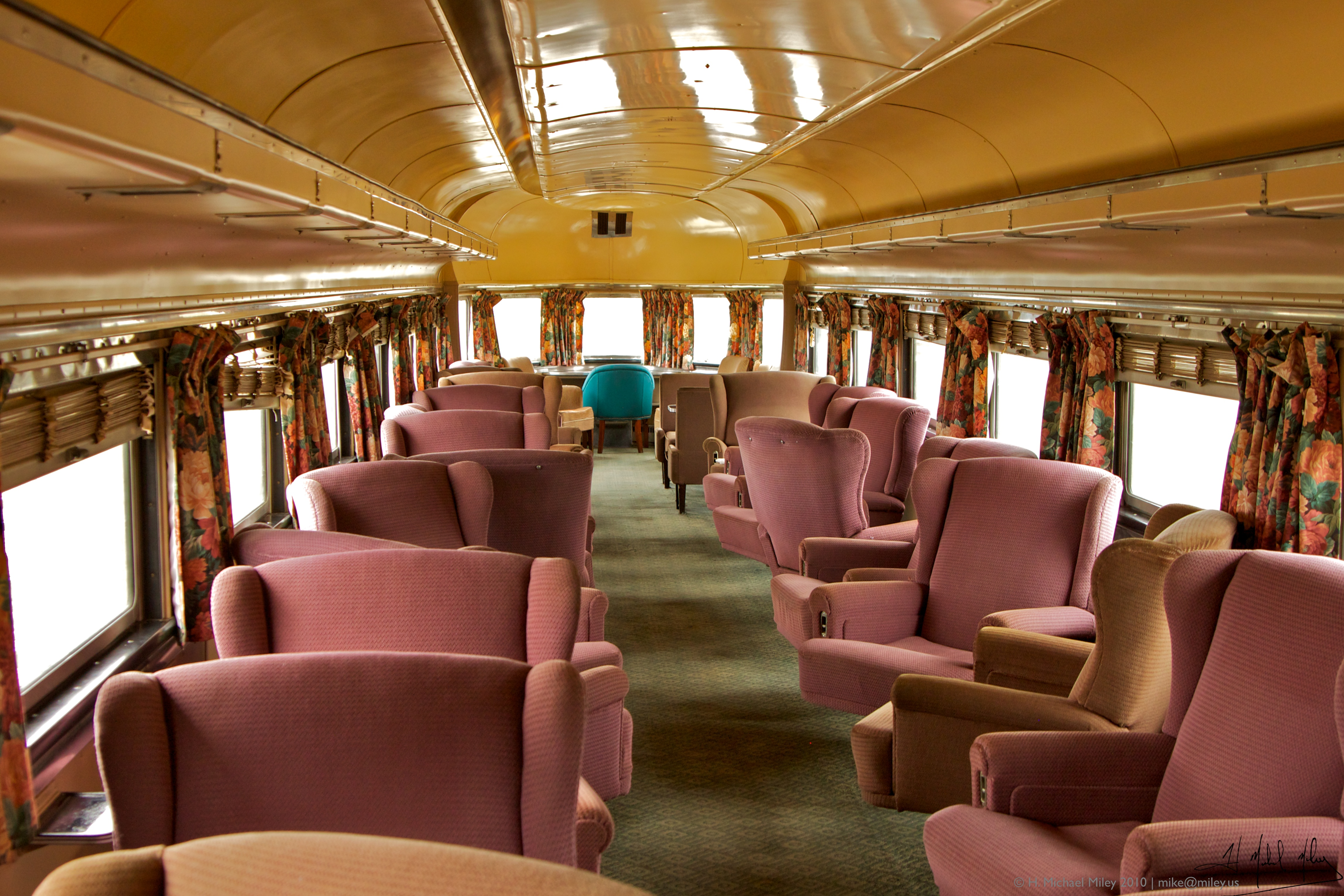
First class observation car Juno on the Nebraska Zephyr

First class is a travel class offered on some trains, passenger ships, aircraft, buses and other modes of transport. Compared to business class and economy class, first class typically offers a better service and more comfortable accommodation, although standards may vary by vehicle or operator. Generally first class carries a significantly higher cost.

== Aviation ==
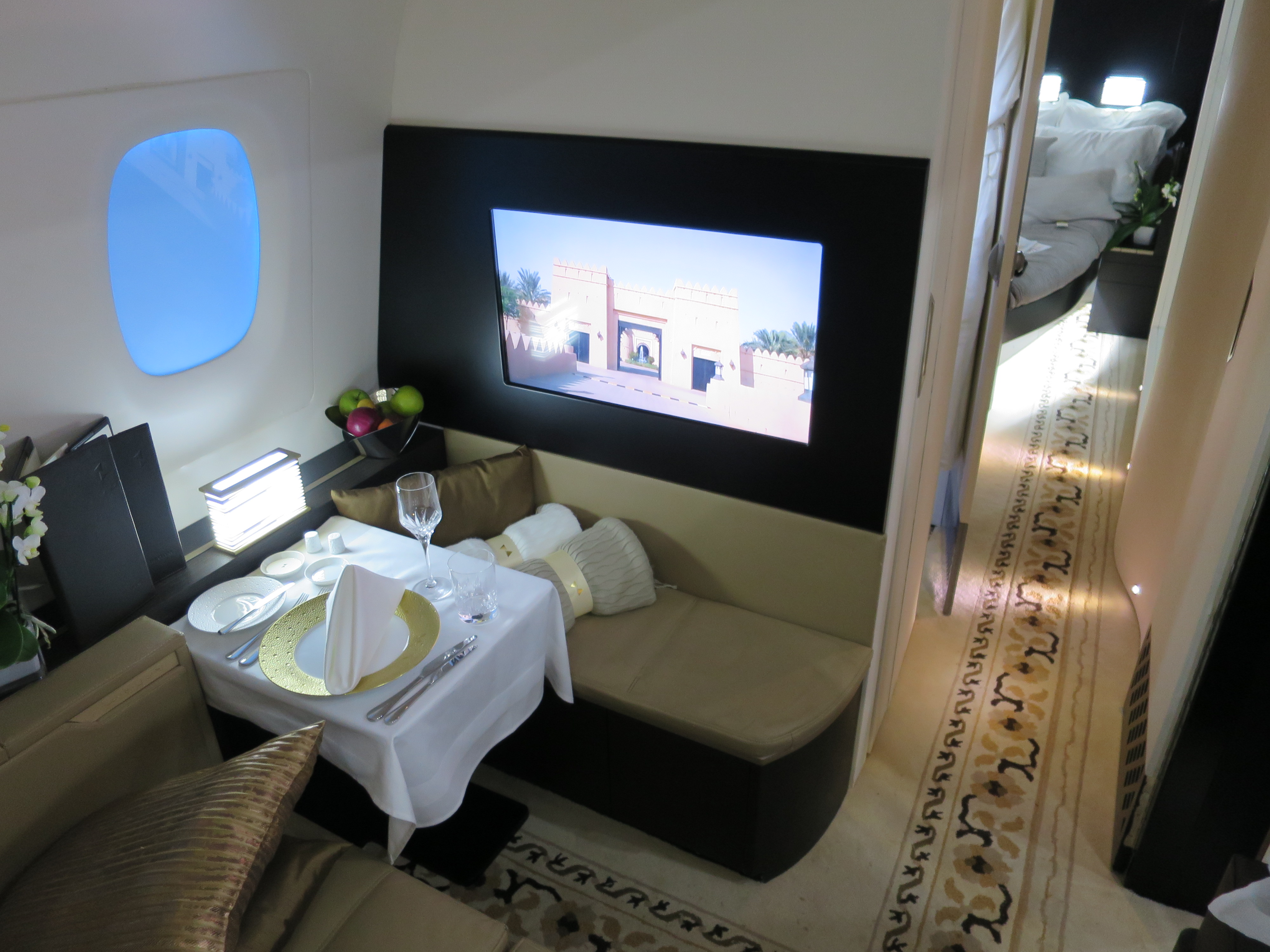
Etihad Airways' "The Residence" suite

The first-class section of a fixed-wing jet airliner is typically toward the front of the aircraft. Many airlines have removed first class altogether from their international flights, offering business class as their highest level of international service. First class passengers are usually allowed into lounges at airports while they wait for their flights.

== Railways ==
While first-class travel accommodation is common in intercity public transport rail services, they have become increasingly prevalent for commuters' short-distance daily travel, especially in rapid transit contexts, rather than longer-distance regional rail. Train stations in bigger cities may also offer lounges comparable to those found at airports for first class passengers or those who have a particular status in their frequent traveler programs.

=== Australia ===
Australia has internal rail operations in each of its states, excluding Tasmania, normally run by the State Government but in some cases is run by private operators. In each state, first class travel differs.

- NSW TrainLink (New South Wales)

First-class travel on TrainLink comes in two forms. On Xplorer and XPT trains, first-class seating is offered which include an increased legroom and seating recline over economy-class seating. On some XPT trains, first-class sleeping compartments can also be found. On day services these accommodate three people per compartment, and by night they carry two people with bunk-style accommodation.

- Queensland Rail (Queensland)

Queensland Rail offer first-class travel on many of their Traveltrain services, along with business class on their Tilt Train Services. Queensland Rail Traveltrain first class carriages provided private cabins in either roomette (single room) or twinette (double room) cabins.

- Journey Beyond (New South Wales, Victoria, South Australia, Northern Territory and Western Australia)

This railway privately operates the tourist-oriented The Overland, Indian Pacific, and The Ghan services. The first class travel on these trains are branded as Platinum Service (on the Indian Pacific and The Ghan) with roomette, twinette and deluxe cabins; or Red Premium Service (on The Overland) with 2×1 seating, extra legroom, and more recline than the Red Service seating.

- V/Line (Victoria)

First-class accommodation on V/Line is a 2×2 seating arrangement, with extra legroom and recline, was previously available on certain locomotive-hauled services. The same carriages exist, but first class was abolished and turned into a regular economy carriage since the introduction of the statewide fare cap.

=== Canada ===
The Canadian (French: Le Canadien) train, operated by Via Rail, offers a Prestige class, comparable to first class. It includes room service, in-room entertainment, and a private washroom with shower. The Québec City–Windsor corridor, also operated by Via Rail, offers a business class.

=== China ===
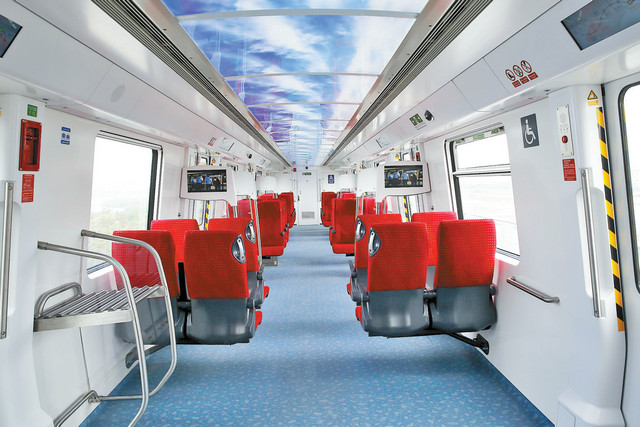
The Business Class car on Shenzhen Metro Line 11

China Railway and its high-speed subsidiary offer First Class on its trains, slotting in between the standard "Second Class" and the premium "Business Class" tier. First Class consists of 2 seats on each side of the aisle, with adjustable, larger-than-normal seats, footrests, and access to sockets, toilets, and water dispensers.

Aside from inter-city train services, Shenzhen Metro Line 11, which serves the regional airport, has become the first metro line in China to offer Business Class cars (making up two of the eight cars on each train). It has been reported that this service, costing three times the amount of a standard class ticket, has remained sparsely used despite overcrowding in the rest of the train.

=== Germany ===
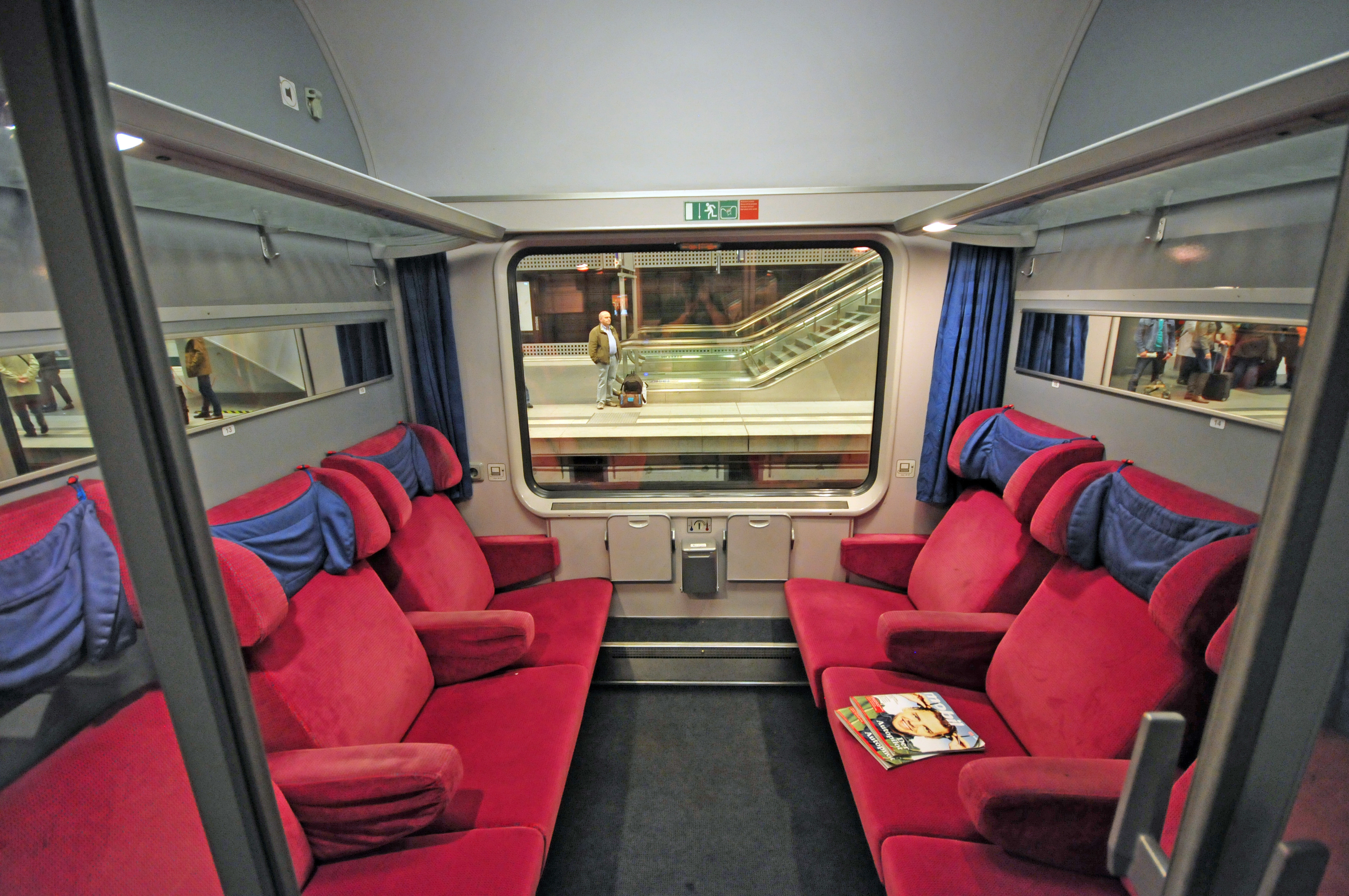
First class car on the Berlin-Warszawa-Express

The various private and state-owned railways in Germany featured first-class, second-class and third-class amenities from the start. Beginning in Prussia in 1852, extremely austere fourth-class coaches were introduced. After nationalization (1920) and consolidation (Deutsche Reichsbahn-Gesellschaft, 1924), the fourth class was abandoned in 1928 in order to generate more revenue by forcing passengers to pay the higher prices for third-class tickets.

As those of most of the rest of Europe, the railways of East as well as West Germany moved to a two-class system in 1956. To this end, the first class was abandoned and the former second and third classes redesignated as the new first and second classes. Except for some regional and commuter train services (including some, but not all S-Bahn systems), which are second-class only, this distinction exists to this day.

The difference in amenities between the first and second class varies between train operators, services and lines. It generally translates to more legroom, tables and/or three-abreast instead of four-abreast seating for first-class passengers. On Deutsche Bahn's national and international services, first-class passengers don't receive a complimentary meal but on all ICE and InterCity services, passengers in first class are served the full selection of meals and refreshments at their seats, while second-class passengers can only obtain them in the dining car.

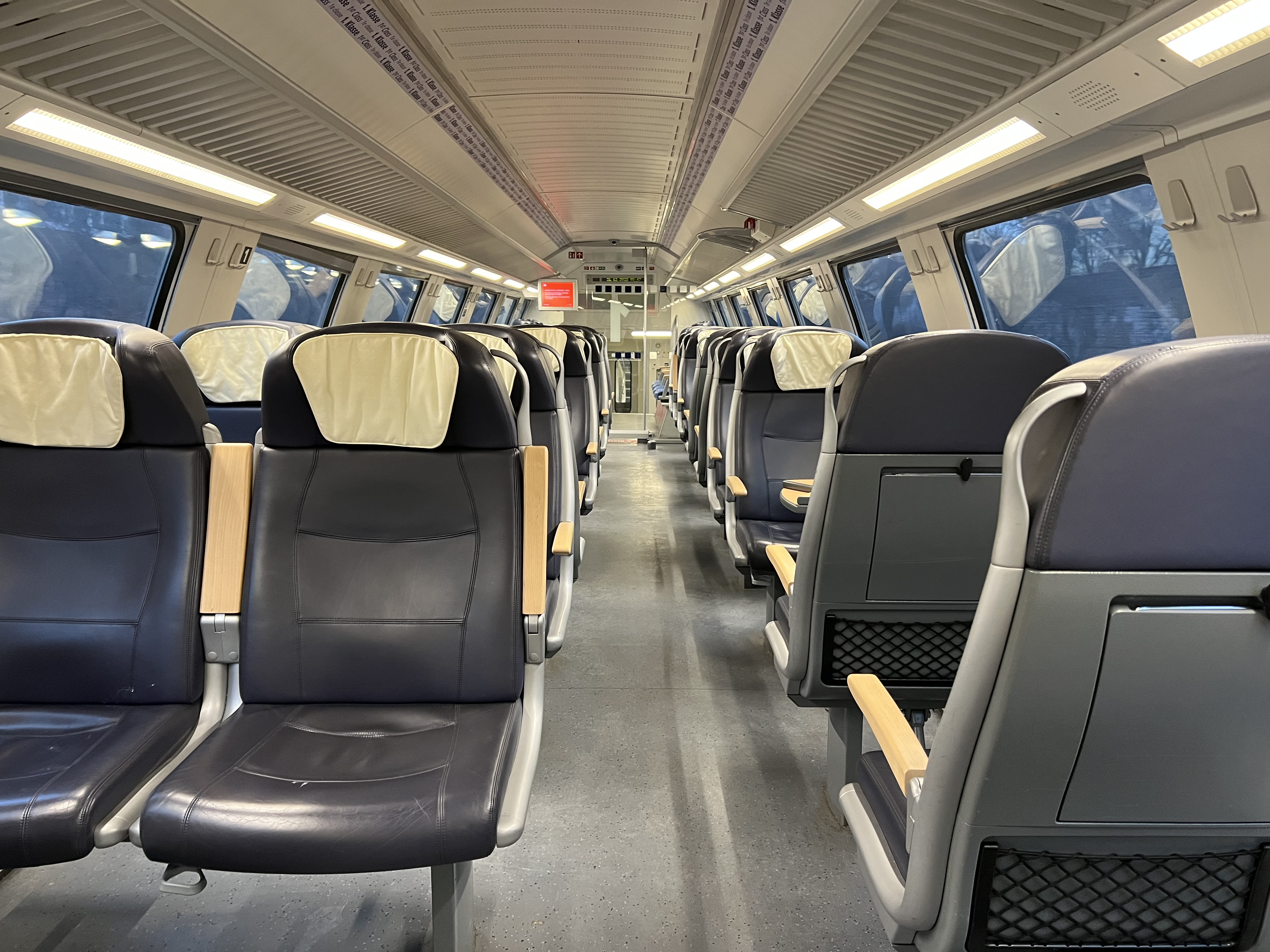
First class on the upper deck of a double decker Regional-Express in Berlin

With some, primary local, services operated both by DB and other companies, there is no difference in seating between classes, with exception to the presence of armrests and tables (with ostensibly cleaner interiors in some instances) in first class. The rationale for providing first-class spaces on these services is mainly that due to the higher price, there are usually seats left in first class when all second-class seats are taken. As such, the justification of purchasing First Class on regional services, often for the average traveller, is more so dictated as offering a "better-odds" gamble of finding vacant seating availability on certain trains (esp. rush hour S-Bahn/regional services) rather than the availability of tangible frills in contrast to second class. While not always enforced, the rules also stipulate that even for standing room in first class, a first class ticket must be held.

=== Hong Kong ===
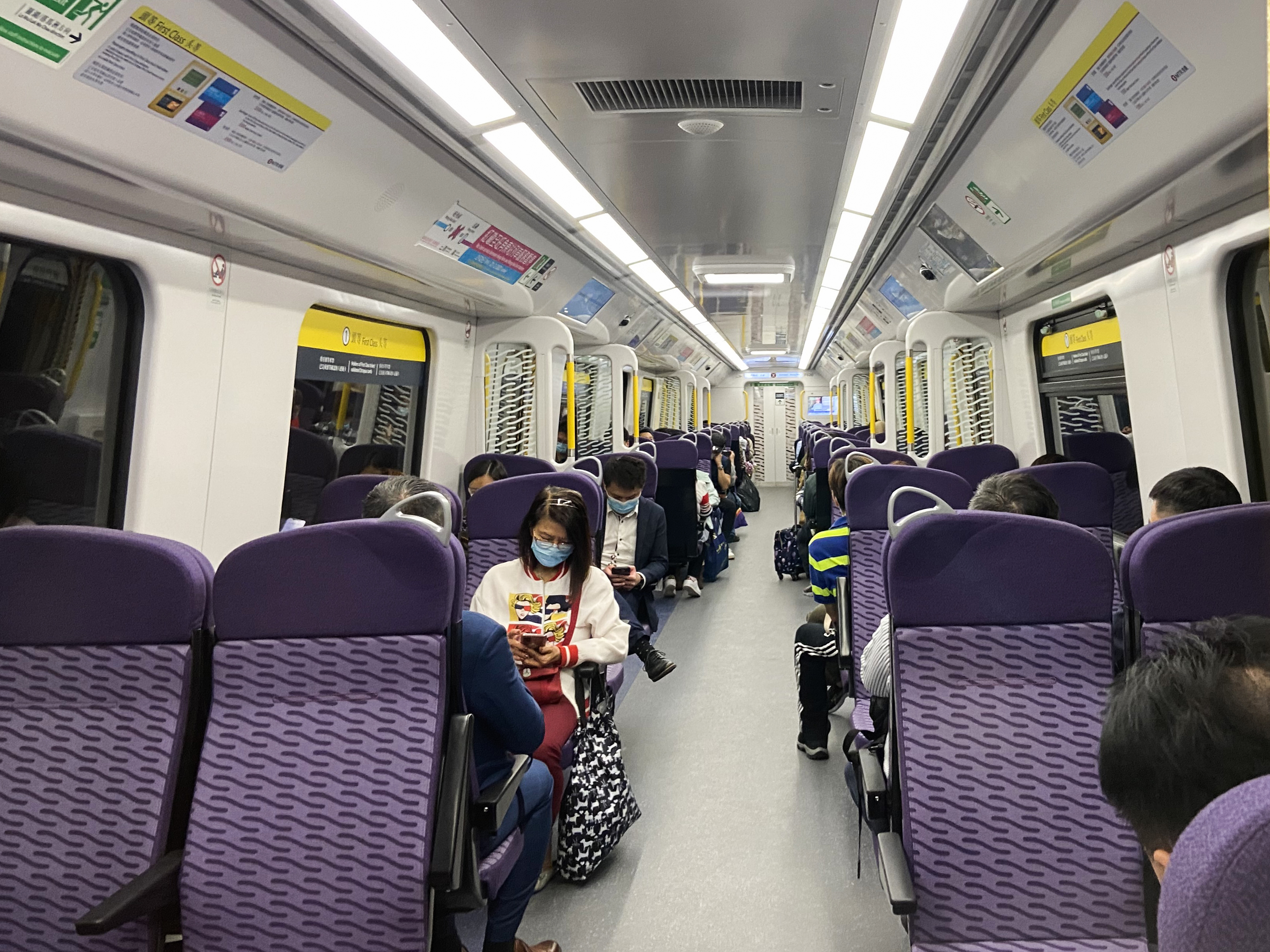
First Class seating on an East Rail line carriage

A First Class compartment is available on each train serving the East Rail line (formerly KCR East Rail) in Hong Kong. Instead of longitudinal, stainless steel benches offered to standard-class passengers, the first-class compartments have comfier, individual padded seating with armrests. They are arranged in pairs and oriented transversely to the compartments. Passengers are required to pay an extra "first class premium" (equaling to the standard adult fare of the same East Rail line journey) on top of the standard fare, and first-class compartments are regularly patrolled by ticket inspectors.

The line originated as an intercity rail service, then known as the Kowloon-Canton Railway British Section, that formerly extended into Guangdong in Mainland China. Even after the line was electrified and modernized in the early 1980s and its trains were converted to provide high-capacity, metro-style service the following decade, the fourth compartment from the north end of each trainset retained its original seating layout as a First Class compartment. In 2007, the line became part of the MTR network, and it remains the only railway line in the region to offer a separate first-class service (though the Airport Express line provides a similar travel experience in all its carriages).

=== India ===
A number of suburban railways in India offer first-class travel, including:

- Hyderabad Multi-Modal Transport System
- Mumbai suburban railway
- Chennai suburban railway

For intercity travel Indian Railways have 4 types of first class coaches.

- Anubhuti Class, which is premium first class sitting coach.
- AC First Class, which is premium first class sleeper coach.
- Vistadome AC, which is basic first class sitting coach.
- Executive Chair Car, which is basic first class sitting coach.
- AC Second Tier, which is basic first class sleeper coach.

=== Indonesia ===
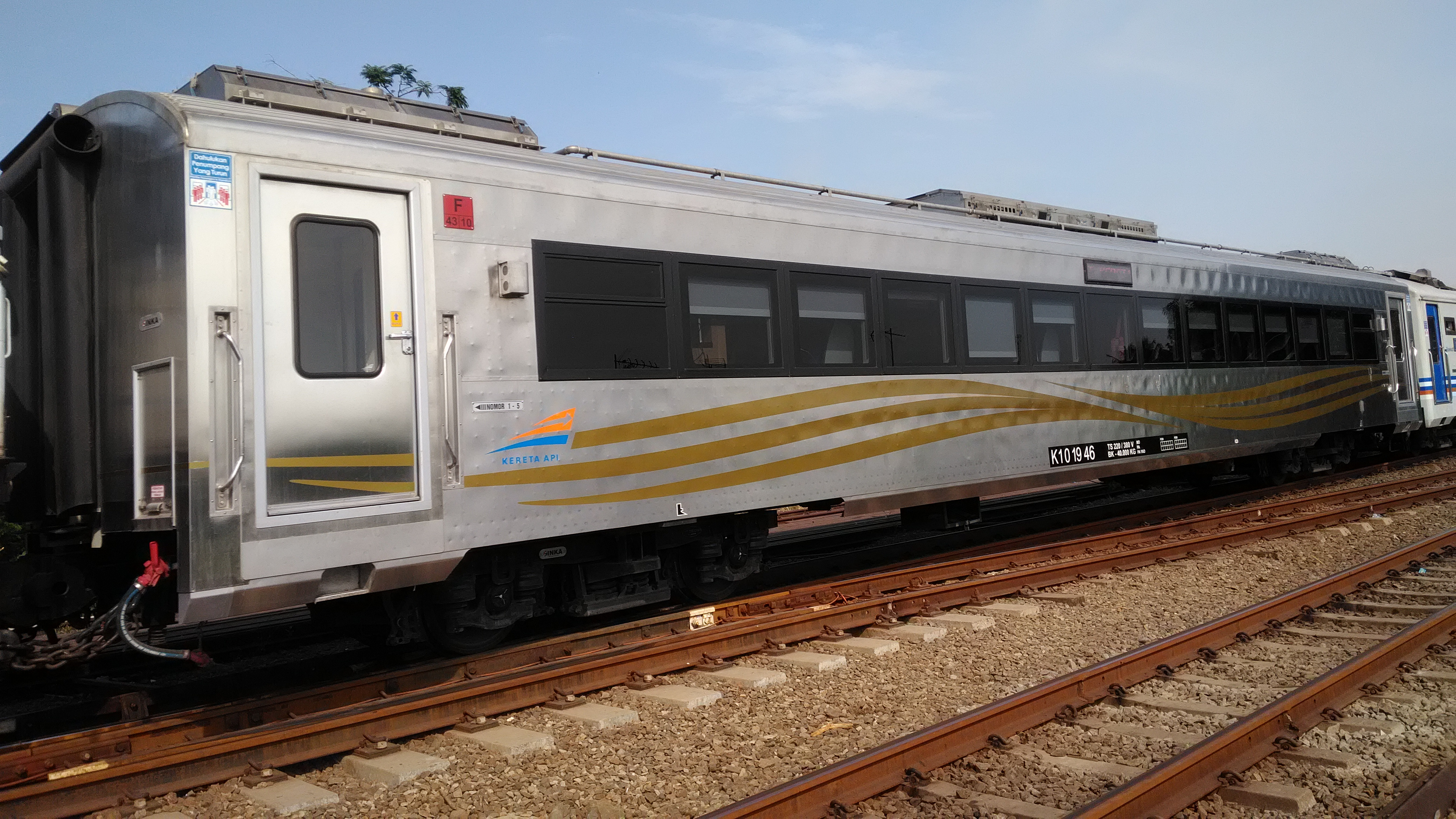
Exterior of a second-generation Luxury class car (K1 0 19 46)

The Indonesian Railway Company operates first-class services that are officially called Luxury class services. Luxury class cars currently in operation have two different designs: the first-generation Luxury cars have a 1-1 seating formation with a dominantly woody ambience; the second-generation Luxury cars have a 2-1 seating formation with a more modern ambience and a complimentary mini bar. Both generations have audio-video on demand (AVOD) displays and a relatively better comfort than Executive-class trains.

=== Japan ===
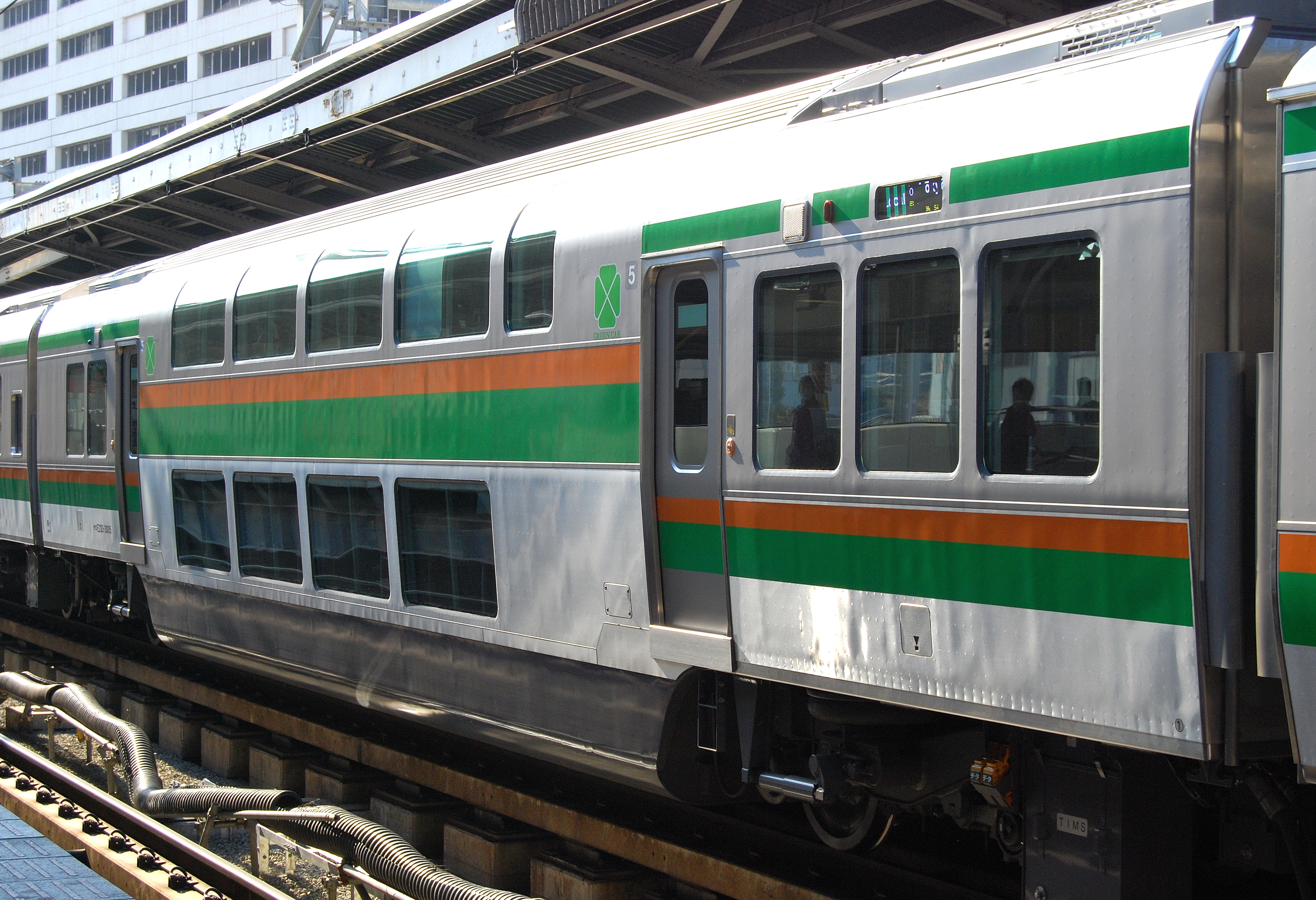
The E233-3000 series outer-suburban train has two bilevel "Green Cars" per train

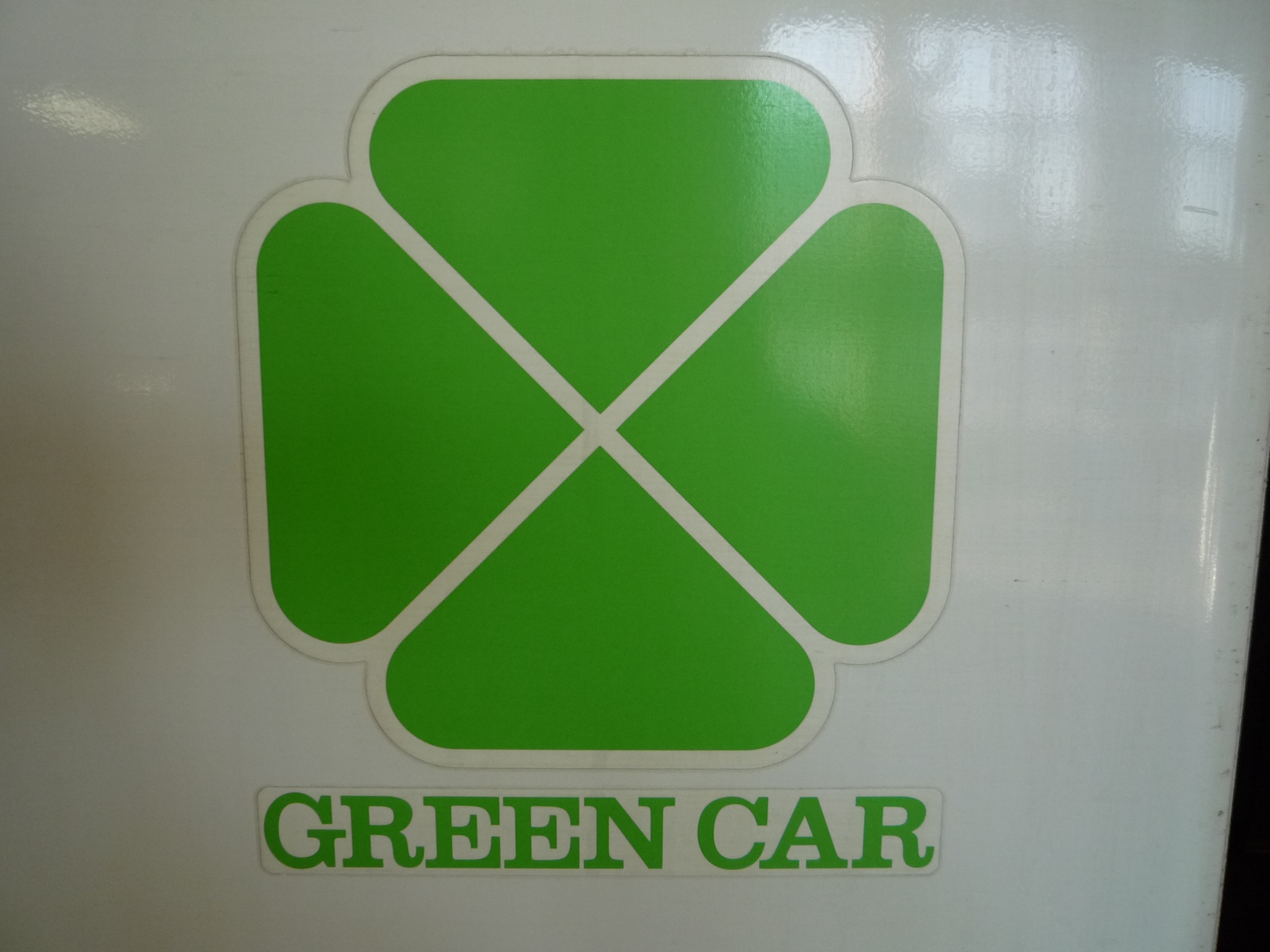
The "Green Car" logo

The term "First Class" was abolished on Japanese National Railways in May 1969, and was replaced by "Green cars". Green cars are identifiable by the green four-leaf clover logo—accompanied with the words "GREEN CAR" typeset in Clarendon—at the doorways, and all seats in these cars are reserved. Usually they are in 1-2 configuration, with 2-2 configuration for Shinkansen trains, although more exclusive accommodations have also been introduced. While "green cars" have traditionally been found on limited express services, in recent years, there has been a gradual trend to restore Green cars to longer-distance commuter lines in the Tokyo area, complete with "Green Attendants" who provide an at-seat refreshment service as well as checking tickets.

In 2011 JR East began offering a premium level of service, "Gran Class" on the Tohoku Shinkansen line but has since extended the Gran Class accommodations to additional lines, with plans to continue adding the Gran Class amenity to new and existing Shinkansen service. The Gran Class cabin bears similarity to the appearance of upper class accommodations found in air travel. With increased leg room, lower passenger seating density, at-seat meals chosen from a menu, unlimited beverage service, as well as additional premium offerings like warm towels, complimentary newspapers, and attendants that can be summoned via pressing a button, the level of service offered supersedes what is offered in Green Cars.

On overnight trains, premium accommodations are known as A cabins, which may be couchettes, private rooms or suites. However, the offering of overnight first class accommodations on inter-city service has largely been phased out, facing the competition from the speed and convenience offered by the continued expansion of the Shinkansen network. As of 2023, only two overnight trains that offer first class-style sleeper accommodations, the Sunrise Seto and Sunrise Izumo, still operate in regular revenue service.

Nagoya Railroad (Meitetsu) refers to its first-class coaches as its "myu-ticket" (ミューチケット) service. These coaches are somewhat more comfortable than economy class and include assigned seating.

=== The Netherlands ===
Similarly to Germany, Dutch trains have had two classes since 1956. On Intercity trains, first class has a 2+1 seating, as opposed to 2+2 in second class, can recline and feature a feet rest in coach seating and have power sockets. For commuter trains both first and second class are in 2+2 layout, the difference between second and first class is in the padding of the seats, an additional armrest, decorative lighting and being more quiet due to being located at the ends of the train. Most regional trains in the rural areas only contain second class. Since 2015 all new bought trains contain power sockets in both first and second class in agreement with the government.

=== Philippines ===
The PNR South Long Haul project's express trains will operate a three-class configuration starting in 2022. "First Class" was defined by the Philippine National Railways as being lower than business class but higher than second class. This is based on the China Railway layout and similar to the Austrian Railjet model, with First Class being more of a premium economy class equivalent for railways.

The express trainsets were ordered in late 2019 but these were cancelled by February 2021. However, these were again proposed for bidding five months after the cancellation, with the order for 21 trainsets or 63 cars scaled down to 3 trainsets or 9 cars.

A first class or similar offering is also expected to be used on the North–South Commuter Railway with the introduction of the Clark International Airport–Alabang Airport Express Train service, which will be classified as limited express trains.

=== Qatar ===
The Doha Metro, which began trial service in 2019, has a "Gold Class" section in one end car, similar to that of Dubai (below).

=== Russia ===
The term "First Class" is not used as such by the Russian Railways, which has its own class system, but is commonly employed to translate the corresponding Russian term "SV" ("СВ" or "Спальный вагон", literally "Sleeping Car"). Note that while technically most cars in Russian long-distance trains are sleepers (i.e. berths rather than seats), the term is used only for the first-class cars. Such cars usually have 8 or 9 two-berth compartments with transversely mounted soft couches and a TV set, two toilets on different ends of the car, and a communal shower room (in 8-compartment cars). There is also a deluxe version of the SV car, usually dubbed "Premium", which features one-berth (or two-berth with foldable upper berth) compartments with a built in toilet/shower and better furnishing. This deluxe variant is sometimes informally referred to as "Myagky Vagon" (literally "Soft Car"), though this is a misnomer, as historically such designation indicated the intermediate between the SV and Coupe classes, long since discontinued, and referred to the better furnishing and softer padding of the berths as compared to the traditional Coupe class.

The service is usually the same in all classes on Russian Railways, the main difference being the increased personal space, reduced noise, and better isolation from unwanted contact with strangers, as well as better amenities; lower class cars may have a single shower per two couchette cars (54 passengers), while SV cars have one per 16 passengers, and in a Premium car each passenger has their own shower, an important consideration on lines such as the Trans-Siberian on which travel may last for up to a full week.

=== Spain ===
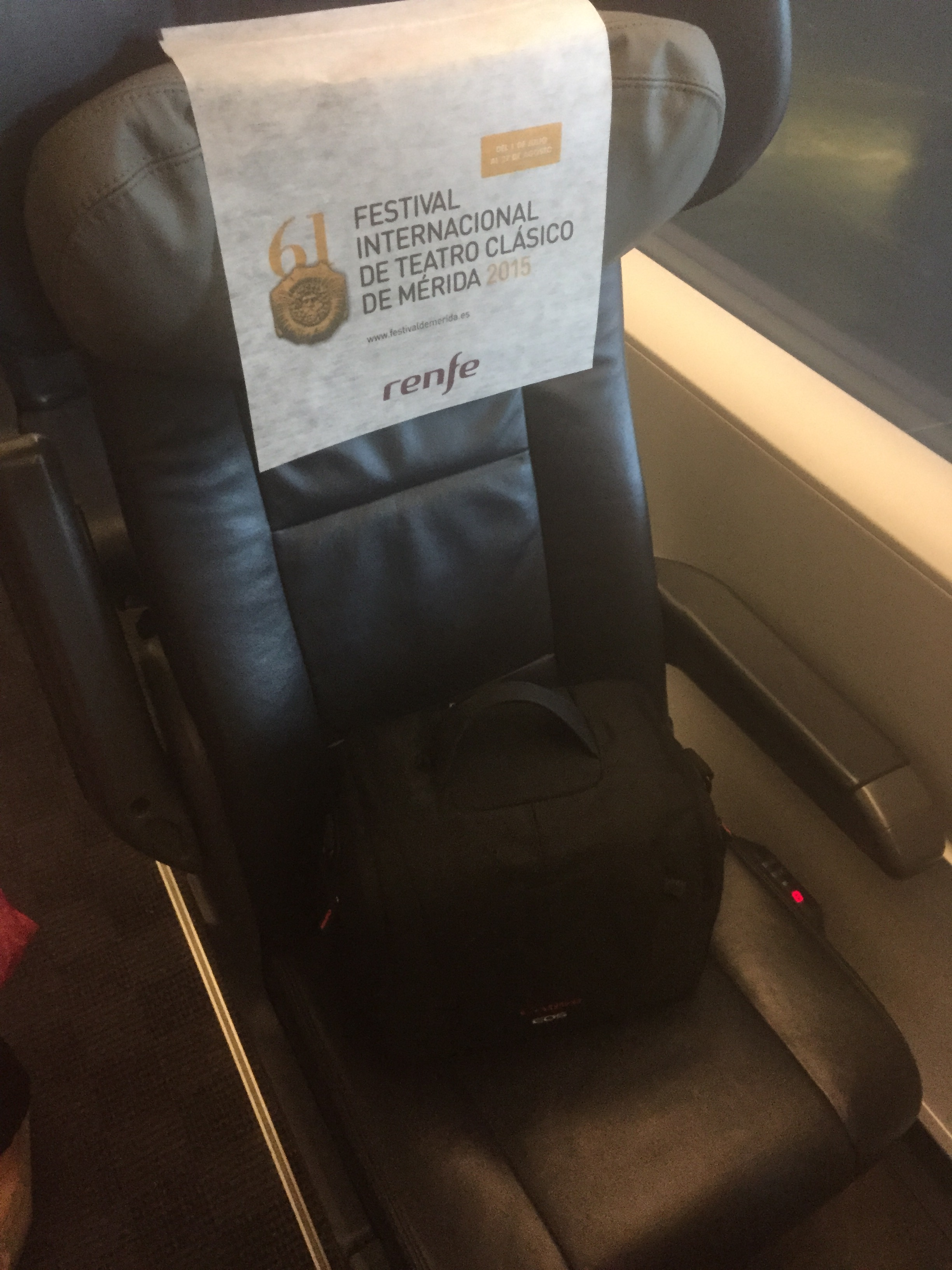
Renfe AVE first class seat

First-Class travel is not available on short-distance trains in Spain such as the Regionales or Cercanias services, but on long- and medium-distance trains such as the Altaria or Euromed services "Preferente" class, comparable to British first class, is available. This includes complimentary food and drinks (typically a welcome-aboard drink, including champagne, and drinks with the meal) as well as larger seats.

A further service is available on the high-speed AVE network. A club-class or preferente ticket allows access to lounges at certain stations. And onboard club-class service includes a large leather seat, power supply, à la carte food and unlimited complimentary bar service at the seat.

On all Spanish "Grandes Líneas" (long-haul) and Media Distancia (medium-haul) trains, video and music is available and accessed through complimentary headphones. Prices for first-class travel are not discounted other than for off-peak times of day and the price of a "preferente" ticket is normally only €30–40 more than economy, and club class on the AVE is normally only €40 more than "preferente"—significantly cheaper than most first-class fares in Britain.

=== United Kingdom ===
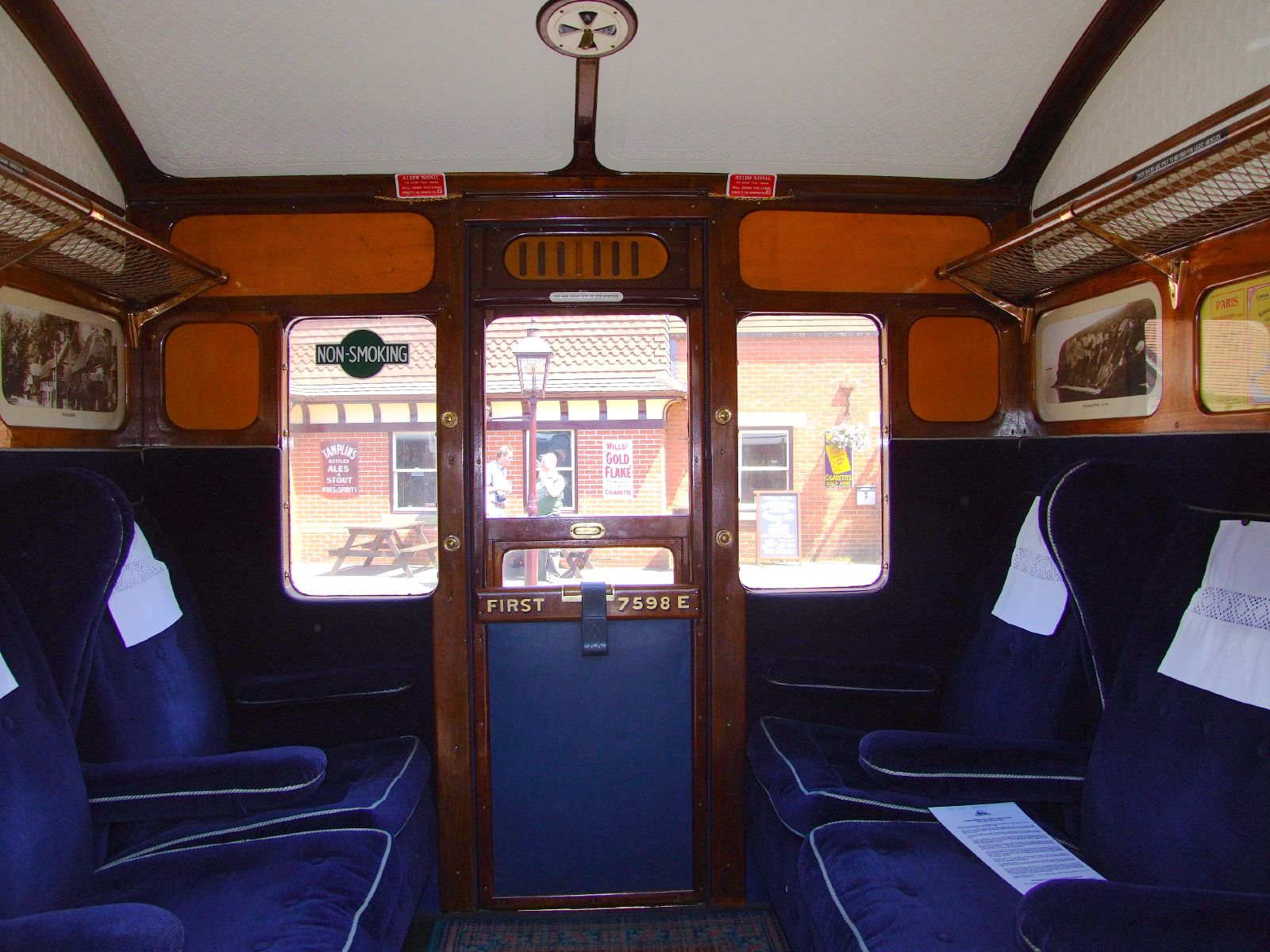
First Class compartment on the Bluebell Railway

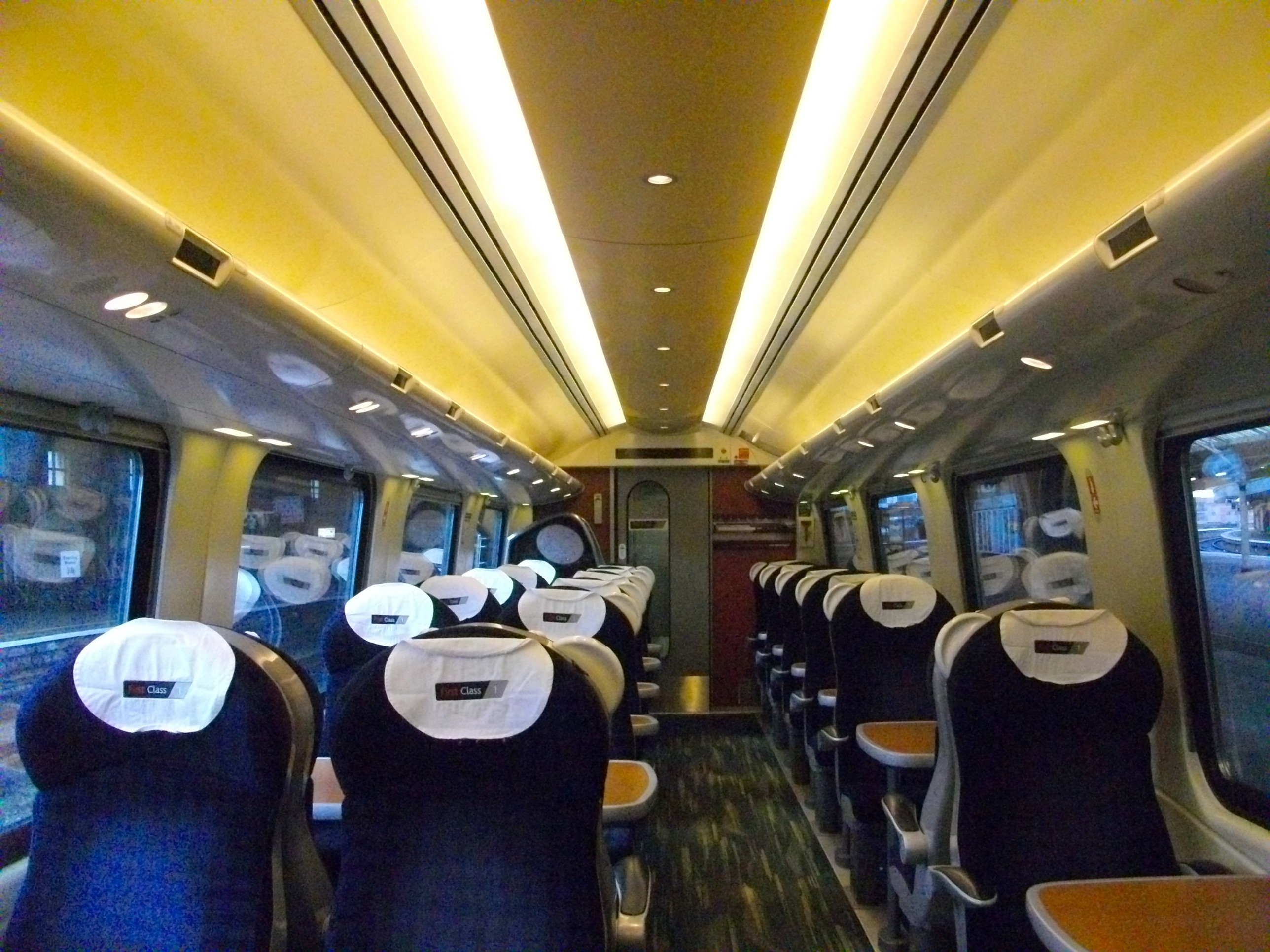
First class interior of a Class 221 Super Voyager

The existence and nature of different classes of passenger service on British trains has varied over time. From its inception, first, second, and third class carriages were provided, alongside luxury Pullman coaches. Currently, most longer-distance services offer First Class and Standard Class, whilst most local and suburban services are single class – as are urban transit services such as the London Underground.

A First Class ticket offers access to dedicated sections of the train, nearly always featuring fewer but larger, and more comfortable seats, in a generally more spacious arrangement that provides more personal space, often a table and upgraded decor/carpeting, and in some cases additional amenities (such as power outlets for mobile phones or laptop computers and as well as upgraded lighting for each set of seats).

In addition to the dedicated seating, the current First Class rail experience may include access to a passenger lounge (at major departure and/or arrival stations) and additional on-board services, such as food and/or drinks service, complimentary newspapers, free onboard WiFi etc. Such on-board services vary widely; they can be distributed by train operating company, by route, by day of week (weekday or weekend), and by time of day. The most complete First Class experience is offered by long-distance train operators, such as Great Western Railway, Avanti West Coast, London North Eastern Railway, and Transport for Wales's Premier Service, especially on weekday morning and evening trains on high-volume routes, where it is targeted at business travellers.

On busy commuter services First Class seating is similar or identical to Standard Class. However, its much higher cost ensures the First Class ticket holder a better chance of finding a seat. Some train operating companies offer First Class fares that are often nearly double the fare of Standard Class. On some services despite the existence of a First Class cabin, it is "declassified" indicating that any ticket holder may sit there, and first class tickets are usually not sold.

First Class service is also offered on the overnight Caledonian Sleeper service from London to Scotland.

Eurostar international trains between Great Britain and continental Europe offer two distinct first-class services, which they call Business Premier and Standard Premier respectively, in addition to Standard Class. The on-board accommodation is the same; the difference is greater flexibility, a shorter check-in time and more extensive catering (a full meal instead of a lighter snack) for the Business Premier service. Standard Premier was introduced on September 1, 2010; formerly, this service was called Leisure Select and also included full meal catering.

=== United States ===
From 1863, George Pullman introduced comfortable long-distance rail cars from what was to become the Pullman Company, founded in 1867.

Today, on Amtrak services, first-class travel is available on the Acela Express service, as well as long-distance services operated with Superliner or Viewliner stock. Passengers also have access to special waiting rooms at many cities and high-traffic stations. First class on the Acela Express service has wider seats than the standard business class (44 vs. 65 seats per carriage), in-seat electrical outlets, a carriage attendant, and complimentary meals and beverages. On the long-distance services sleeping accommodation is provided, including Roomettes, Bedrooms, Bedroom Suites, and Accessible Bedrooms. Many rooms include a shower and toilet; for other rooms a toilet and/or shower is located nearby. Meals and other hotel-style services are also included in the price.

=== South Korea ===
KTX (Korea Train eXpress), KTX-Sancheon (Type A, B), Saemaeul, Mugunghwa (available only in some routes) class trains operate First Class service. Called Teukshil (특실), First Class offers larger and comfortable seats. KTX and KTX-Sancheon First Class service includes complimentary mineral water, a headphone, water tissues, and a sleeping shade. Usually First Class tickets are about 50% more expensive than Economy Class tickets. First Class is located on Car 2, 3, 4 on the KTX trains, Car 3 on the KTX-Sancheon trains, and car 1 on the Mugunghwa and Saemaeul trains. ITX (Intercity Train eXpress) - Saemaeul trains do not have a First Class car.

=== Switzerland ===
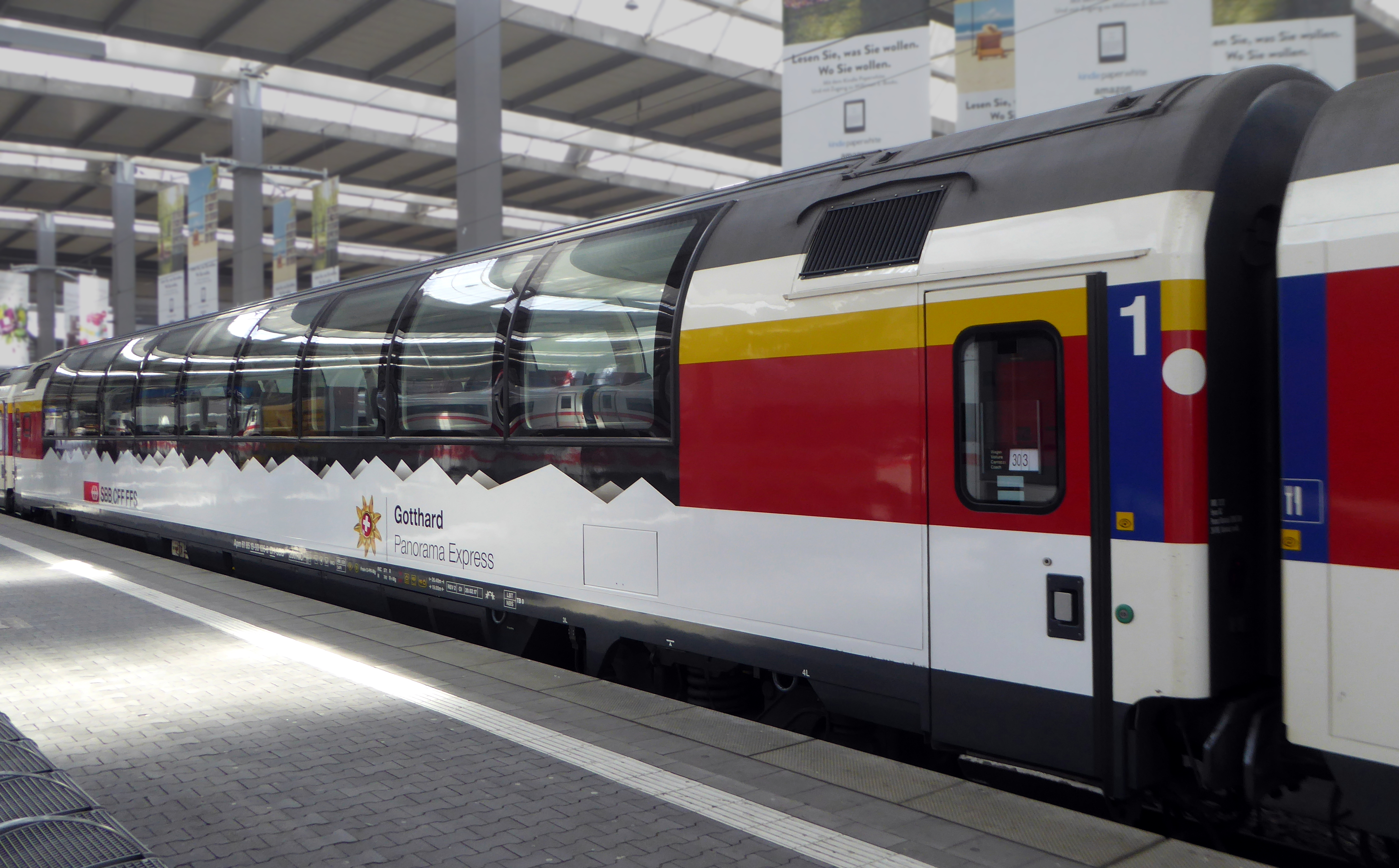
First class car of the Gotthard Panorama Express

Switzerland's national railway company Swiss Federal Railways (SBB CFF FFS) as well as BLS AG and Südostbahn (SOB) offer both first- and second-class travel on all services, the only exception being the RegioExpress (RE) between Neuchâtel and Frasne (France). Most private railway operators also offer first class travel.

First class coaches typically have fewer seats per car and therefore more individual space. The seats are also more comfortable compared to the second class. Some first class coaches feature larger windows, such as in Panorama Express (PE) trains. Long-distance trains typically feature a dining car between the first and second class coaches.

=== Taiwan ===
The Taiwan Railway provided a first-class carriage on its limited express train from 1949 until 1953, when travelling classes were officially abolished.

=== United Arab Emirates ===
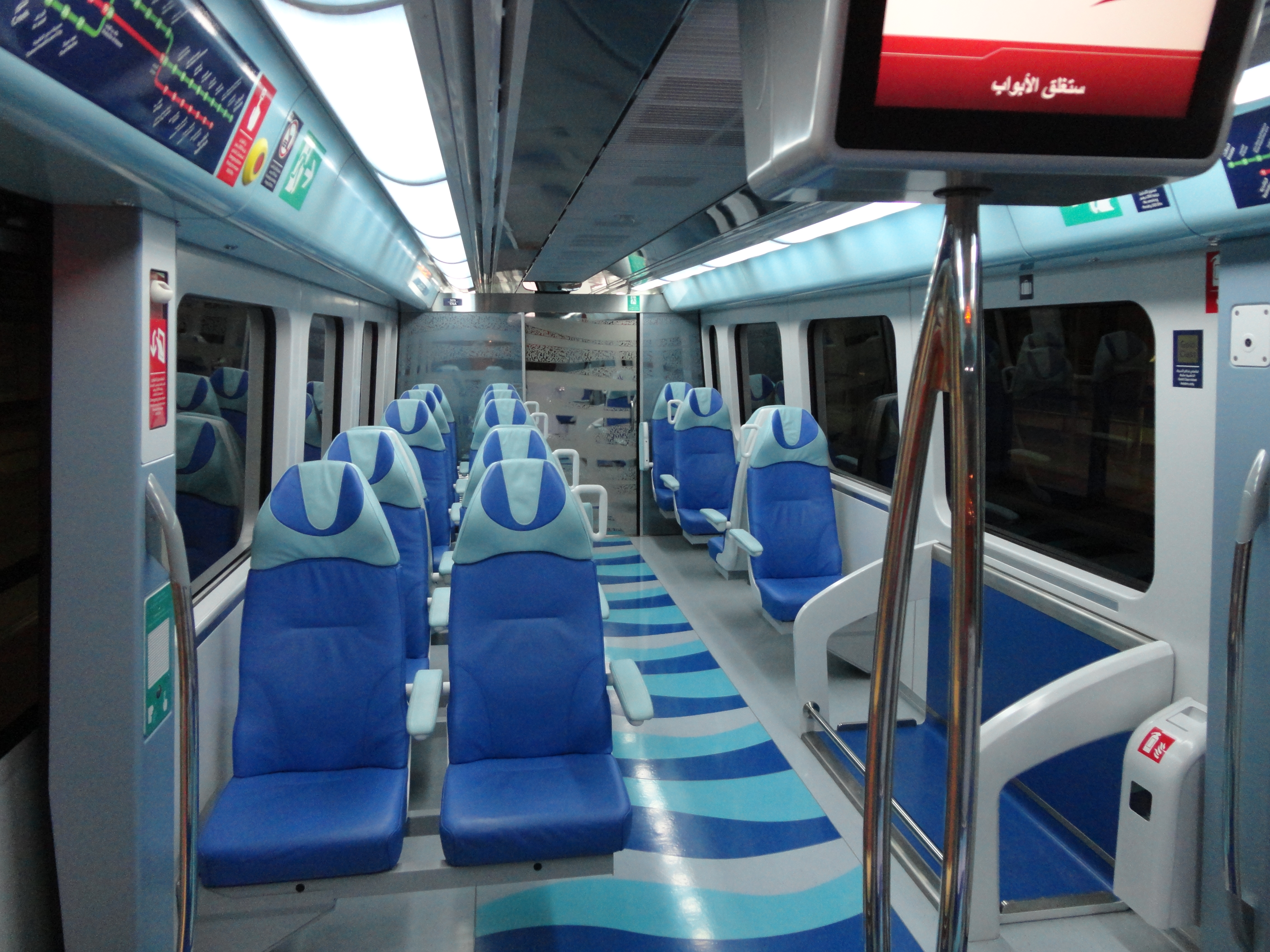
The "Gold Class" section of a Dubai Metro train

Part of one end car of trams and each Dubai Metro train is designated as Gold Class, featuring individual seats, tray tables, and luggage compartments.

== Cruise ships and liners ==
Some benefits of first class on modern cruise ships include larger cabins, priority check-in, priority embarkation and disembarkation, priority meal-sitting selection, and, on premium lines, butler service.

== See also ==
- First class (aviation)
- Travel class
- Passenger car (rail)
