= Roomette =

Type of sleeping car compartment

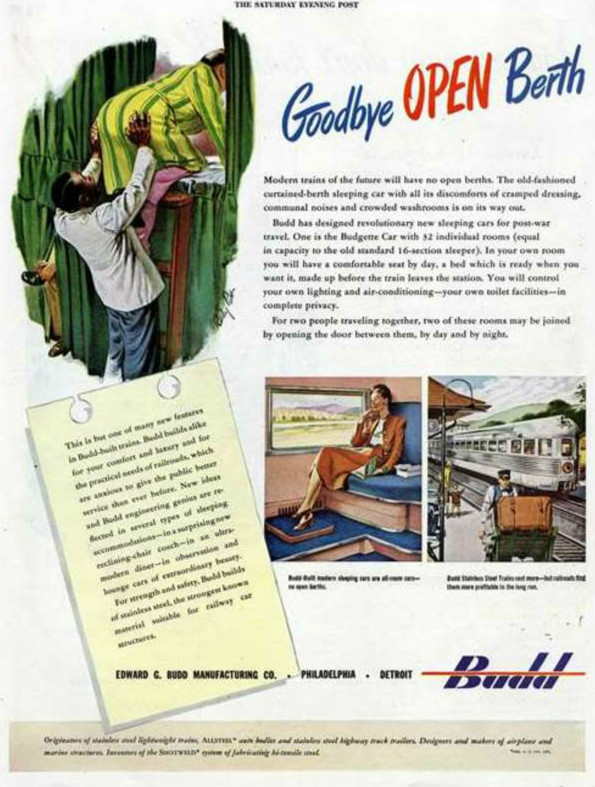
1945 ad by the Budd Company for its "Budgette" cars.

A roomette is a type of sleeping car compartment in a railroad passenger train. The term was first used in North America, and was later carried over into Australia and New Zealand. Roomette rooms are relatively small, and were originally generally intended for use by a single person; contemporary roomettes on Amtrak, however, include two sleeping berths.

== By country ==
=== Australia ===
In Australia, a roomette is designed for use by one person. The width of each compartment is typically slightly less than half the width of the sleeping car it is in, with a corridor running down the centre and the compartments on both sides. The number of roomettes in a sleeping car can vary slightly, but it is commonly 16, 18, or 20.

The bed in a roomette folds into one of the end walls of the compartment when not in use, and a seat folds upwards to replace it. Thus the bed is parallel to the side of the train, in contrast to twinette berths, which are perpendicular to it. Because of the narrow width of the compartment, when the bed is folded down, it occupies most of the floor-space of the compartment. In older designs, the bed could occupy most of the room.

Roomettes often have their own toilet and wash basin which folds into the wall, as well as hot and cold taps. In older-style roomette cars, the corridor runs down the car in a straight line, and the floor area of the compartments is rectangular. Because the bed occupies most of this area when folded down, the toilet cannot be unfolded and used while the bed is down. This means that if the passenger wishes to use the toilet, they must temporarily fold the bed at least partially upwards.

The floor-plan in newer roomette cars is somewhat different, and was designed to remedy this shortcoming. The corridor zigzags slightly down the car, and the floor-plan of each roomette forms a trapezium with two right angles. The bed occupies the rectangular area closest to the side of the car, and there remains a small right-angled triangular area of floor space which remains clear, its hypotenuse adjacent to the corridor, which zigzags the opposite way once at the start of each roomette on each side, dovetailing with the triangular area in each roomette. This extra floor space is sufficient to unfold the toilet and wash basin, so that they can be used while the bed is still folded down.

Unlike twinettes, roomettes do not include a shower; passengers use a communal shower at the end of the car, and also a toilet in the same location if they wish. Occasionally, older roomettes do not have their own toilet, either.

From 1949 to the mid-1990s, the train running between Adelaide and Melbourne, Australia, called The Overland, used roomette cars of both the basic designs described above, the majority being of the older design.

=== North America ===
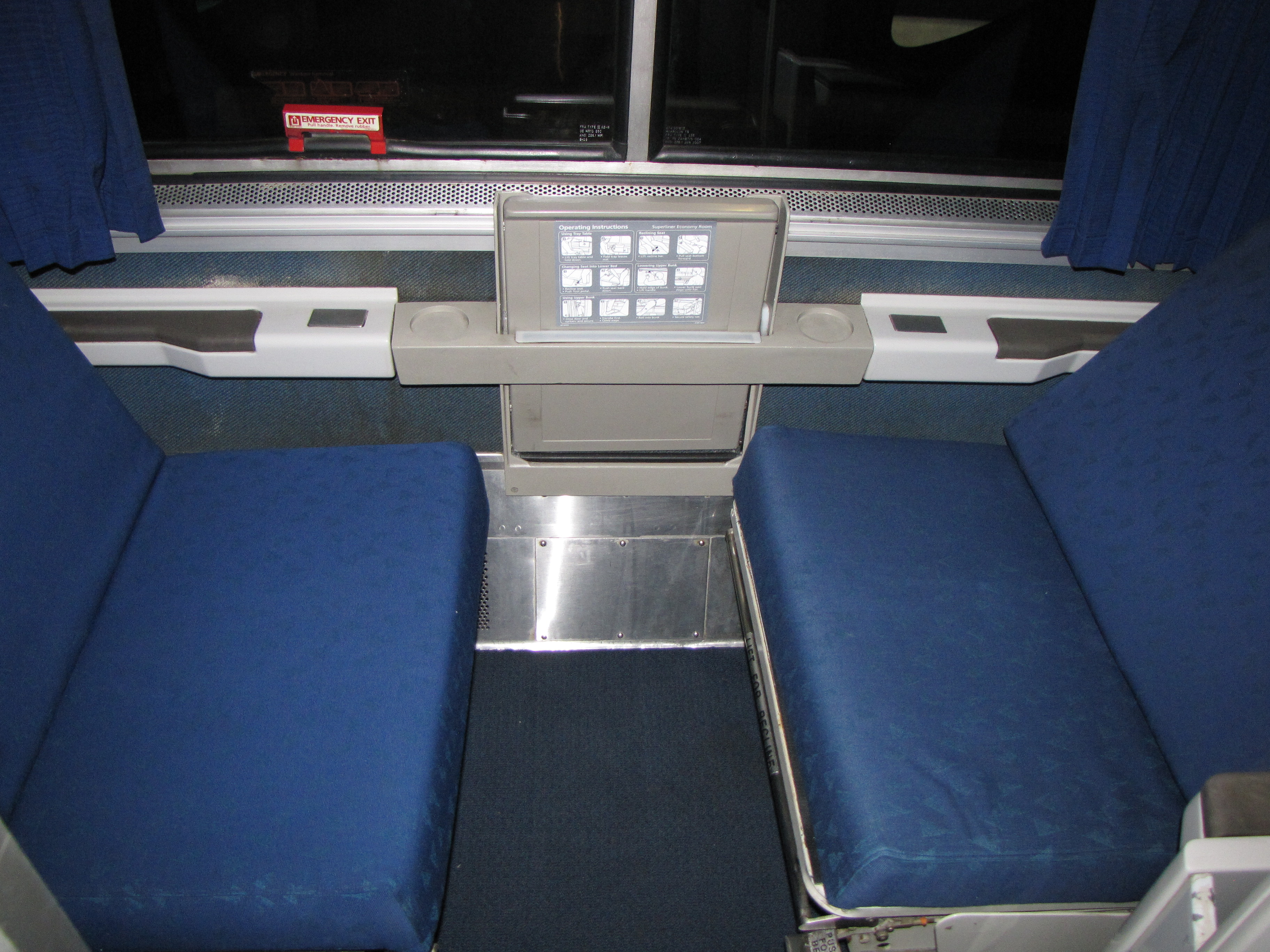
A Superliner roomette in daytime configuration.

The term "roomette" dates from 1937, when the first sleeping cars with such accommodations were constructed by the Pullman Company. The roomette was an innovation for its day, providing a relatively economical, fully-enclosed sleeping accommodation for the individual traveler: a marked change from the open-berth sleeping accommodations that were the standard of the era. Roomette and other private-room sleeping accommodations quickly gained popularity, and became the standard in the United States after World War II. Similar equipment later became commonplace in Canada and Mexico as well.

The basic roomette design pioneered by Pullman remained standard in North America until well after the advent of Amtrak in 1971. The roomette section of a sleeping car included a central corridor with rooms on either side. At night, each room contained a small single bed, placed longitudinally, which occupied nearly the entire area of the room. The bed could be folded away when not in use, exposing a padded bench seat at one end of the room and a toilet at the other. A small washbasin was also provided. A mid-twentieth century sleeping car could contain approximately 22 roomettes, though it was more common for a car to include a mix of roomettes and other private-room sleeping accommodations. The most common sleeping car type of the era contained ten roomettes and six "double bedrooms", which were designed for use by two people. Sleeping cars containing roomettes of this basic design remain in use today in Canada.

Amtrak designed new types of sleeping-car accommodations when it began constructing new long-distance equipment in the late 1970s, and today it uses two primary types of sleeping cars. Most long-distance trains use double-deck Superliner equipment, while a few eastern trains use single-level Viewliner cars. Roomettes on these sleeping cars include single bench seats on both ends of the room; the seats fold together to form a single bunk bed, and an upper bunk folds down from the ceiling. Superliner roomettes do not include private toilets or washbasins. Roomettes in Viewliner I cars built through 1996 have toilets and washbasins, while those on Viewliner II cars built starting in 2010 have washbasins only.

== See also ==
- Sleeping car
- Slumbercoach
- Twinette
