= Edward Keble Chatterton =

English writer, editor, and naval officer (1878–1944)

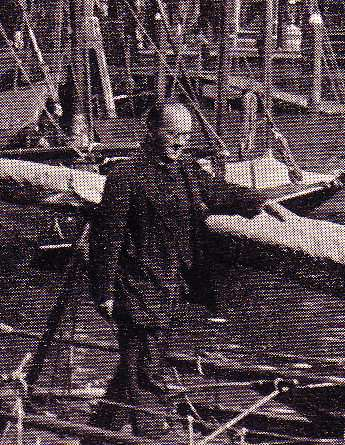
- Keble Chatterton in Dordrecht, the Netherlands, in 1910
- Born: 10 September 1878; Sheffield
- Died: 31 December 1944 (aged 66)
- Education: St Stephen's House, Oxford
- Military career
- Allegiance: United Kingdom
- Branch: Royal Navy
- Service years: 1914–1919
- Rank: lieutenant commander

Edward Keble Chatterton (10 September 1878 – 31 December 1944) was a prolific writer who published around a hundred books, pamphlets and magazine series, mainly on maritime and naval themes. In the First World War he served in the Royal Naval Volunteer Reserve (RNVR).

== Biography ==
He was born at 76, Rock Street, Sheffield, England; attended Sheffield Royal Grammar School; and then St Paul's School, in Hammersmith, London. He took a BA at St Stephen's House, Oxford, and then began to write theatre and art reviews for various magazines. He edited The Lady's Realm from 1904 until 1906.

He made a number of small-boat voyages through the English Channel and the Netherlands. He recorded these voyages in magazine articles and books, and wrote several books on the maritime art collections of the Low Countries.

When World War I began, Chatterton joined the RNVR, ultimately commanding a motor launch flotilla at Queenstown, now Cobh, in Ireland. He describes these years in Q-Ships and their Story (1923), The Auxiliary Patrol (1924) and Danger Zone: The Story of the Queenstown Command (1934). He left the service in 1919 with the rank of Lieutenant Commander.

In the interbellum, his writing was continuous, and included a series of monographs on model ships, many histories of naval events, and a number of juvenile novels. Most of his books were republished in the United States, and several were translated into French and German.

He was a member of the Royal Thames Yacht Club for many years, and made a multi-season voyage to the Mediterranean through French canals. He described these in a further series of books. His journeys on the Nantes–Brest canal are outlined in Through Brittany in "Charmina": From Torbay to the Bay of Biscay in a 6-Tonner (1933), journeys on the Canal du Midi are described in To the Mediterranean in "Charmina" (1934), and journeys along the French Riviera are described in "Charmina" on the Riviera (1937).

After 1939, his writing focused on the war with Germany. Hutchinson published a series by Chatterton documenting the Royal Navy at war. He died at the end of 1944, after which Kenneth Edwards completed the series.

== Published works ==
- Sailing ships; the story of their development from the earliest times to the present day. London: Sidgwick & Jackson. 1909.
- Down the Channel in the "Vivette". London: Sidgwick & Jackson. 1910.
- Steamships and their Story. London: Cassell & Co. 1910.
- The Romance of the Ship, The Story of Her Origin and Evolution. London: Seeley, Service & Co. 1911.
- The Story of the British Navy. London: Mills & Boon. 1911.
- Fore and aft, the story of the fore & aft rig from the earliest times to the present day. London: Seeley, Service & Co. 1912. pp. vii, 232–233 – via Internet Archive.
- King's Cutters and Smugglers 1700–1855. London: George Allen & Co, Ltd. 1912.
- Aquitania: The Making of a Mammoth Liner. London: Cunard Steamship Co Ltd. 1913.
- Ships and Ways of Other Days. London: Sidgwick & Jackson. 1913.
- Through Holland in the Vivette. London: Seeley, Service & Co. 1913.
- The Old East Indiamen. London: Seeley, Service & Co. 1914.
- The Romance of Piracy. London: Seeley, Service & Co. 1914.
- The Romance of Sea Rovers. London: Seeley, Service & Co. 1914.
- Daring Deeds of Famous Pirates. London: Seeley, Service & Co. 1917.
- The Marvels of the Ship, The Story of the Development of the Ship from the Earliest Times. London: Seeley, Service & Co. 1921.
- Q-Ships And Their Story. London: Sidgwick & Jackson. 1923.
- The Auxiliary Patrol. London: Sidgwick & Jackson. 1923.
- The Mercantile Marine. London: William Heinemann. 1923.
- Holme, Geoffrey, ed. (1923). Ship Models. London: Studio Ltd.
- Eight Decades of Progress, History and Development of a Great Steamship Organisation. Manchester: TG Evans & Co. 1924.
- Seamen All. London: William Heinemann. 1924.
- Steamship Models. London: T Werner Laurie. 1924.
- Battles by Sea. London: Sidgwick & Jackson. 1925.
- Whalers and Whaling. The Story of the Whaling Ships Up to the Present Day. London: T. Fisher Unwin. 1925.
- Chats on Naval Prints. London: T. Fisher Unwin. 1926.
- The Ship under Sail. The Splendour of the Sailing Ship through the Ages. London: T. Fisher Unwin. 1926.
- Windjammers and Shellbacks. Strange True Stories of the Sea. London: T. Fisher Unwin. 1926.
- The Brotherhood of the Sea... With Illustrations. London: Longman & Co. 1927.
- Captain John Smith. London: John Lane. 1927.
- Old Ship Prints. London: John Lane. 1927.
- Old Sea Paintings, the Story of Maritime Art as Depicted by the Great Masters. London: John Lane. 1928.
- Ventures and Voyages. London: Rich & Cowan. 1928.
- King of the Air. Philadelphia: J. B. Lippincott & Co. 1928.
- On the High Seas. London: P Allen & Co. 1929.
- In Great Waters. London: Frederick Warne & Co. 1929.
- Through Sea and Sky. London: Frederick Warne & Co. 1930.
- English Seamen and the Colonization of America. London: J. W. Arrowsmith Ltd. 1930.
- Gallant Gentlemen. London: Hurst and Blackett. 1931.
- Sailing the Seas, A Survey of Seafaring Through the Ages. London: Chapman & Hall. 1931.
- The Königsberg Adventure. London: Hurst and Blackett. 1932.
- The Sea Raiders. London: Hurst and Blackett. 1932.
- Adventurers of the Air. London: Frederick Warne & Co. 1932.
- Through Brittany in "Charmina". London: Seeley, Service. 1933.
- The Yachtman's Pilot to the Harbours of England, Wales, Scotland, Ireland, & the Continent of Europe from Ymuiden to Bordeaux. London: Hurst and Blackett. 1933.
- Below the Surface. A Naval Novel. London: Hurst and Blackett. 1934.
- Danger Zone: The Story of the Queenstown Command. London: Rich & Cowan. 1934.
- The Big Blockade. London: Hurst and Blackett. 1934.
- Sailing Models Ancient & Modern. London: Hurst and Blackett. 1934.
- Amazing Adventure. A Thrilling Naval Biography. London: Hurst and Blackett. 1935.
- Dardanelles Dilemma, The Story of Naval Operations. London: Rich & Cowan. 1935.
- Seas of Adventures, The Story of the Naval Operations in the Mediterranean, Adriatic and Aegean. London: Hurst and Blackett. 1936.
- Valiant Sailormen. London: Hurst and Blackett. 1936.
- Charmina on the Riviera. London: Hurst and Blackett. 1937.
- Sea Spy. London: Hurst and Blackett. 1937.
- Severn's Saga. London: Hurst and Blackett. 1938.
- Secret Ship. A Sea Novel. London: Hurst and Blackett. 1939.
- Stories of the Seven Seas. Thrilling Exploits of the Navy. London: World's Work. 1939.
- The Epic of Dunkirk. London: Hurst and Blackett. 1940.
- The Leaders of the Royal Navy. London, Melbourne: Hutchinson & Co. 1940.
- Fighting the U-Boats, 1914–1916. London: Hurst and Blackett. 1942.
- The Royal Navy, Britain at War. London, Melbourne: Hutchinson & Co. 1942–47.
- Beating the U-Boats (1917 and 1918). London: Hurst and Blackett. 1943.
- Commerce Raiders. London: Hurst and Blackett. 1943.
- Scouts of the Sky. London: Frederick Warne & Co. 1943.
