= Public Transport Commission =

Rail, bus and ferry agency of NSW (1972–1980)

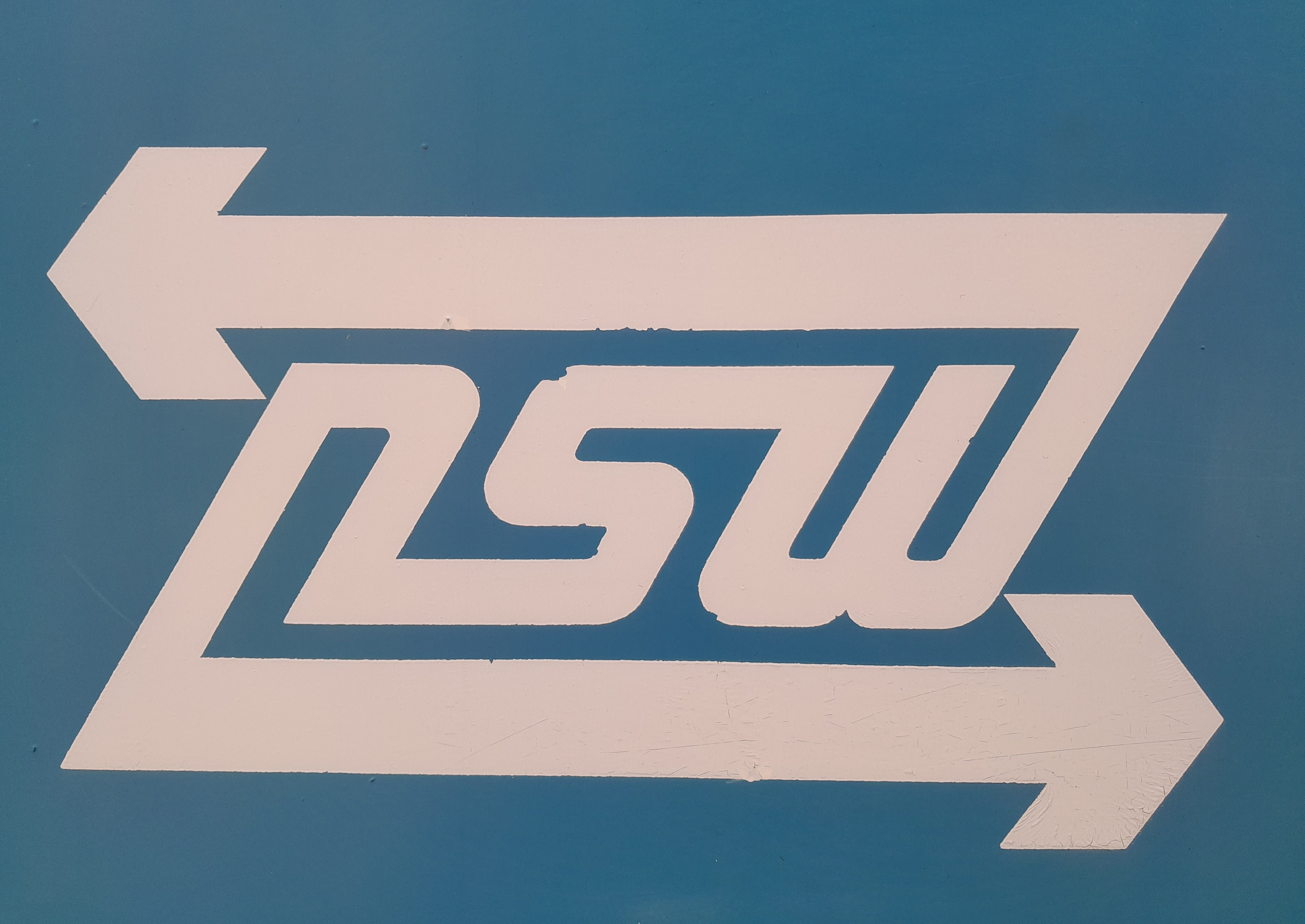
- Public Transport Commission Logo on a preserved bus

Commission overview
- Formed: 20 October 1972
- Preceding agencies: Department of Railways; Department of Government Transport; Sydney Harbour Transport Board
- Dissolved: 30 June 1980; 46 years ago
- Superseding agencies: State Rail Authority; Urban Transit Authority
- Jurisdiction: New South Wales
- Headquarters: Sydney
- Minister responsible: Peter Cox, Minister for Transport
- Key documents: Public Transport Commission Act 1972 (NSW); Public Transport Commission and Sydney Harbour Transport (Amendment) Act 1974 (NSW)

The Public Transport Commission (PTC) was an agency of the Government of New South Wales responsible for the provision of rail, bus and ferry services in New South Wales, Australia from October 1972 until June 1980.

Upon dissolution, responsibility for rail services transferred to the State Rail Authority and responsibility for bus and ferry services to the Urban Transit Authority.

The PTC, composed of five Commissioners appointed by the Governor of New South Wales, was accountable to the Minister for Transport.

== Structure ==
The Blue L7 used in the latter era of the agency

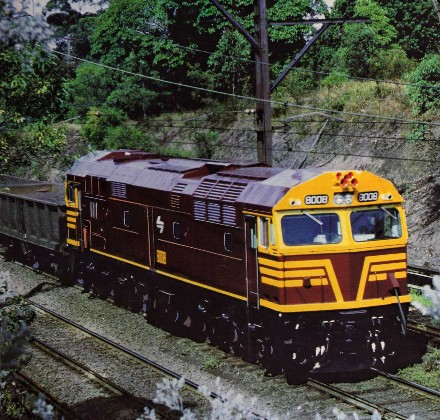
80 class locomotive in 1978

The PTC was established pursuant to the Public Transport Commission Act 1972 (NSW) and led to the abolition of the offices of Commissioner for Railways and Commissioner for Public Transport.

The Act facilitated the merger of the Department of Railways and the Department of Government Transport, the latter being the agency that operated government bus services in Sydney and Newcastle. In December 1974, the Public Transport Commission and Sydney Harbour Transport (Amendment) Act 1974 (NSW) dissolved the Sydney Harbour Transport Board and ferries were added to PTC's responsibility. This coincided with government also taking over the Port Jackson & Manly Steamship Company ferries.

In June 1980, the PTC was dissolved with the State Rail Authority assuming responsibility for rail services and the Urban Transit Authority responsibility for bus and ferry services through the enactment of the Transport Authorities Act 1980 (NSW).

== Management ==
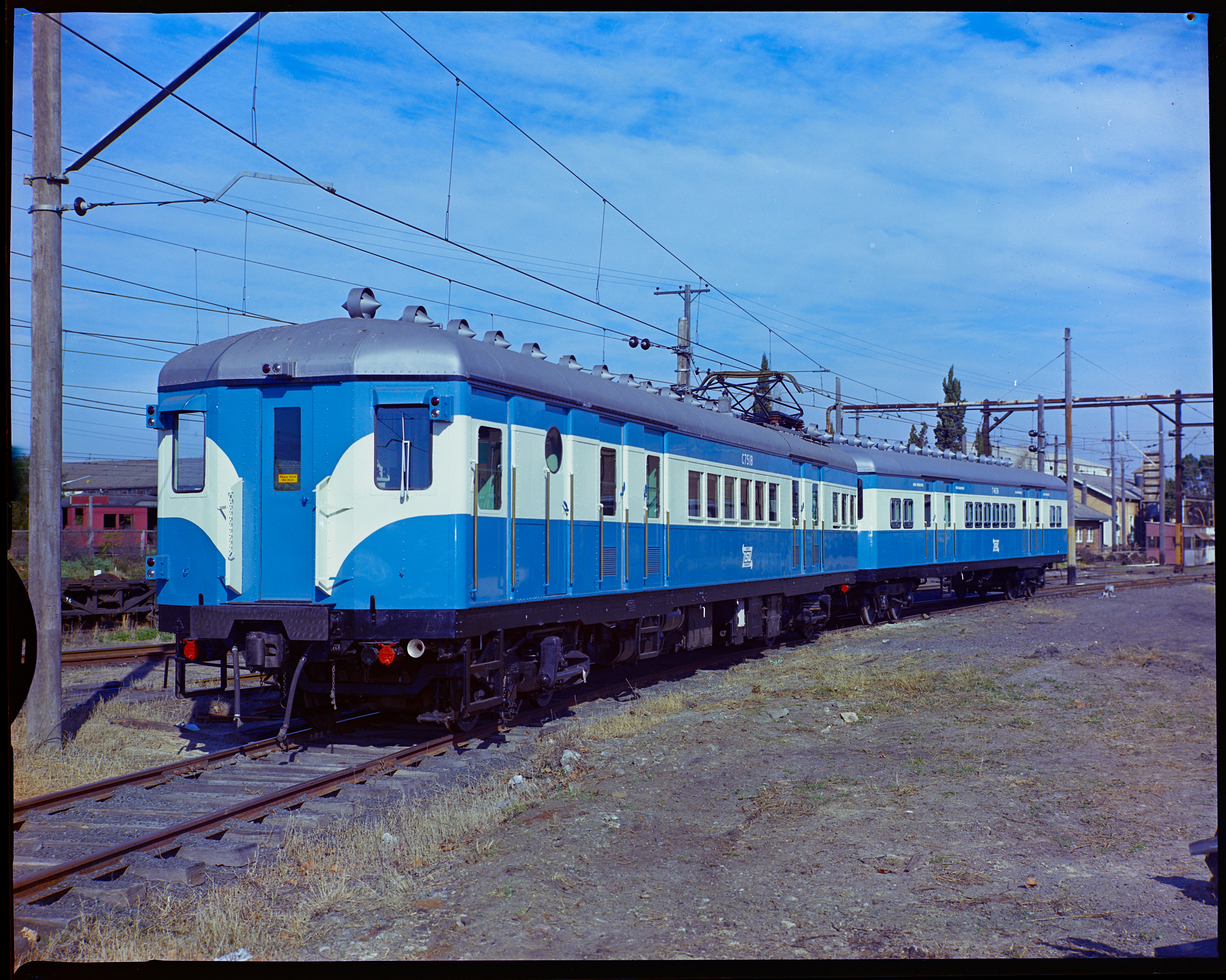
Two Tulloch suburban carriages in the Mandarin blue and Riviera white livery in 1973

The Public Transport Commission consisted of five commissioners appointed by the Governor of New South Wales, two of whom were nominated by the Minister for Transport. Two of the Commissioners were full-time one of these was appointed by the Governor as Chief Commissioner. The Commission acquired the assets and liabilities of the former commissioners, were bound by current agreements or contracts, and were responsible for the completion of business commenced by them. The Commission inherited the functions of the previous Commissioners as prescribed in the Railways Act 1912 (NSW) and the Transport Act 1930 (NSW).

The first Chief Commissioner of the PTC was Philip Shirley, a former chairman of Cunard, who came out of retirement to take up the position. Shirley had been involved with the Beeching cuts being vice chairman of the British Railways Board in his native United Kingdom in the 1960s. His cost-cutting approach was criticised by sections of the public, trade unions and the parliamentary opposition. Shirley retired in 1975, two years before his commission was due to conclude. His successor, until the PTC was disbanded in 1980, was Alan Reiher. Upon the dissolution of the PTC, Reiher became chairman of VicRail.

=== Chief Commissioners ===
#	Commissioner	Term	Time in office	Notes
1	Philip Shirley	20 October 1972 – 1 December 1975	3 years, 42 days	
2	Alan Reiher	20 April 1976 – 19 March 1980	3 years, 334 days	
Vacant to 30 June 1980, succeeded by CEO State Rail Authority and CEO Urban Transit Authority

=== Deputy Chief Commissioners ===
Commissioner	Term	Time in office	Notes
Joshua Trimmer	12 December 1974 – 28 September 1979	4 years, 290 days	
Jack Davies	28 September 1979 – 30 June 1980	276 days	

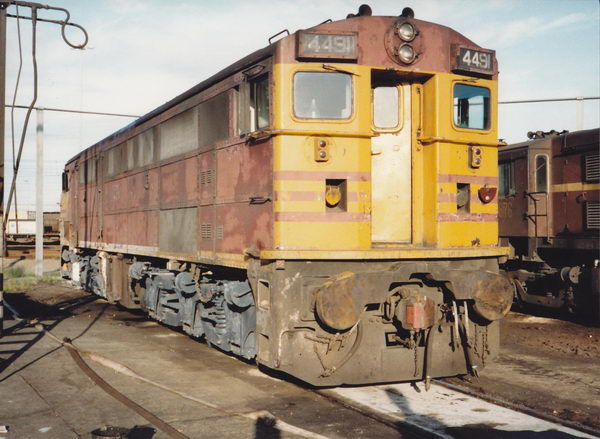
44 class locomotive in the reverse yellow paint scheme

=== Commissioners ===
Full-time Commissioner	Term	Time in office	Notes
Dr Robert Nielsen	20 October 1972 – 31 December 1973	1 year, 72 days	
Joshua Trimmer	20 October 1972 – 12 December 1974	2 years, 53 days	
Eric Archer	1 January 1974 – 15 January 1974	14 days	
Eugene Gordon	13 June 1974 – 30 June 1980	6 years, 17 days	
Nominated Commissioner	Term	Time in office	Notes
Barrie Unsworth	20 October 1972 – 19 October 1975	2 years, 364 days	
Reginald Watson	20 October 1972 – 19 October 1975	2 years, 364 days	
Edington Byrne	20 October 1975 – 19 October 1979	3 years, 364 days	
Ralph Marsh	20 October 1975 – 19 October 1979	3 years, 364 days	
David Hill	12 November 1979 – 30 June 1980	267 days	
Eric Lyndon	21 May 1980 – 30 June 1980	40 days	

== Activities ==
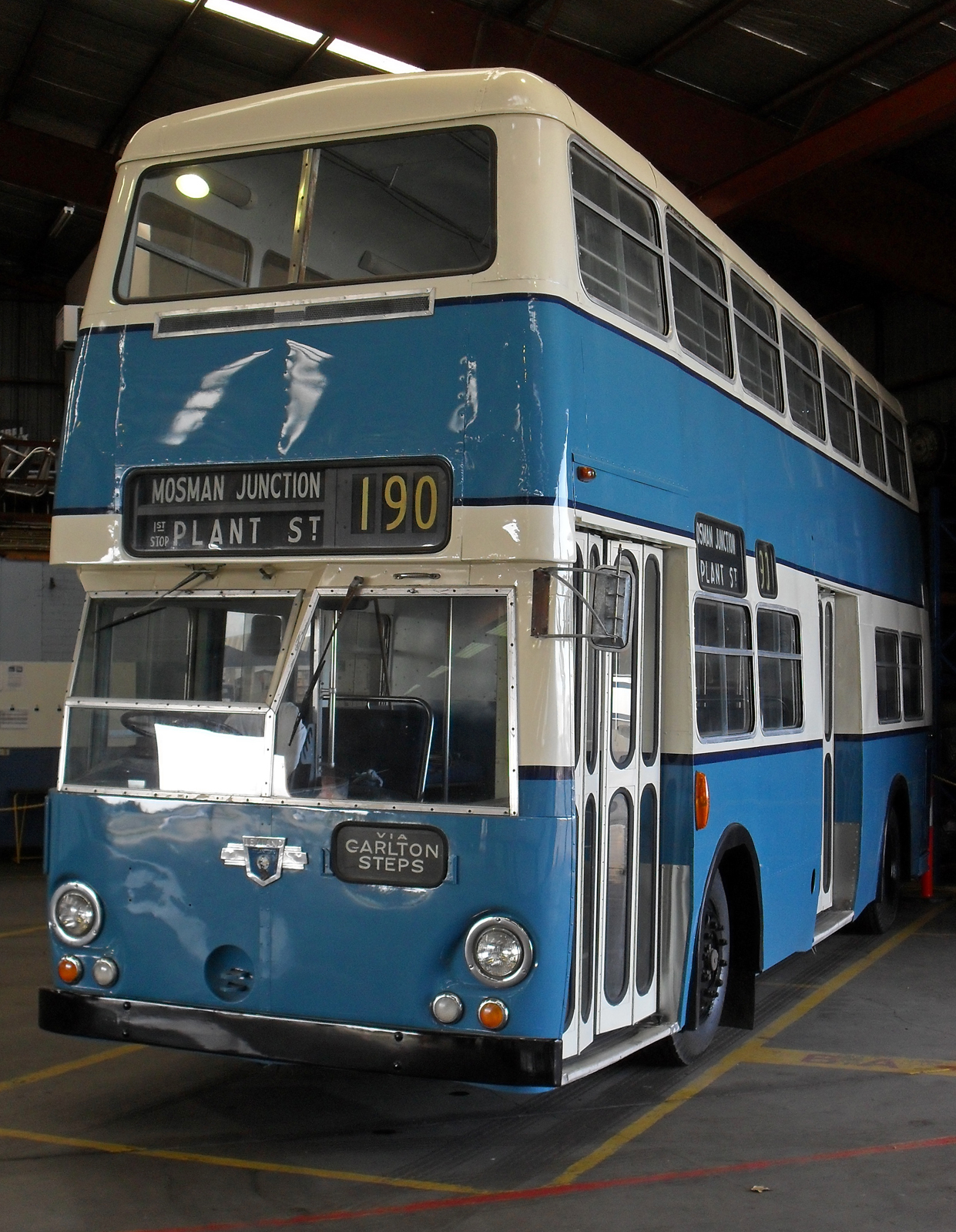
Preserved Pressed Metal Corporation bodied Leyland Atlantean

A mandarin blue and riviera white livery was introduced on buses, suburban electric trains and ferries while freight wagons were painted in a teal blue livery. The livery earnt an affectionate nickname; "Shirley Blue" after the first Chef Commissioner Phillip Shirley. From November 1976, trains reverted to Tuscan red while ferries would revert to their Tuscan and green liveries in the 1980s. In November 1979, a modified livery for locomotives was introduced with the colours on the Tuscan and yellow painted ends reverted.

The original logo had the letters NSW with arrows pointing east and west. It was replaced in 1975 by the L7 logo. It would continue to be used, albeit with different colours, on buses and ferries until 1989 and on trains until 2010.

In June 1974, the PTC took over the operation of Bowden's Bus Service route 79 from the Town Hall to Tamarama. In September 1975, the PTC began operating Denning coaches out of Dubbo when the Far West Express was replaced.

While best remembered as an era of cutbacks, investment was made during the tenure of the Public Transport Commission with the following ordered:

- 312 Leyland Leopard buses
- 750 Mercedes-Benz O305 buses
- 359 Comeng built S set double deck suburban carriages
- 150 A Goninan & Co built S set double deck suburban carriages
- 30 V set double deck interurban carriages
- 10 FAM sleeper carriages
- 30 80 class diesel locomotives
- 10 85 class electric locomotives
- various modern bulk freight wagons
- More than 1,000 RACE containers suitable for the Australia standard pallets
- 2 Lady class ferries (Street & Herron)

== Publication ==
The PTC published an in-house journal, Transport News, with the first edition published in November 1972.

== See also ==
- Railways in Sydney
- Rail transport in New South Wales
- Timeline of Sydney Harbour ferries
