= GJF =

GJF or gjf may refer to:

- .gjf, Gaussian Input Format file extension, a type of Chemical file format
- GJF, Oslo Stock Exchange ticker symbol for Gjensidige, Norwegian insurance company
- GJF, type of wagon in the 1966 Grain series of Victorian Railways hopper wagons
