= VHSY =

VHSY or VHSy may refer to:

- VHSY, a code for hopper wagons used by Railways of Australia
- VHSy, a character from the fourth season of Battle for Dream Island, an animated web series
