= RACE (container) =

The RACE (an acronym for Railways of Australia Container Express) was an intermodal container that was a slightly wider version of the standard ISO shipping container able to take two Australia Standard Pallets side by side.

== History ==
The RACE containers were developed in 1974 by the Public Transport Commission, and built by Freighter Industries. The RACE general container was designed to accommodate 20 standard 1,168 mm × 1,168 mm (46 in × 46 in) pallets stacked on two levels. Carrying capacity was 17 tonnes (16.7 long tons; 18.7 short tons) and it had rear and side doors for ease of loading and unloading.

They were used on trains operated by members of the Railways of Australia; the Public Transport Commission, Victorian Railways, Queensland Rail, Commonwealth Railways and Western Australian Government Railways connecting Cairns, Brisbane, Sydney, Melbourne, Adelaide, Perth, Geraldton and Meekatharra.

There were also ISO RACE containers for non-palletised freight, as well as ventilated, refrigerated and side-loading containers.
