= Alan Reiher =

Australian public servant (1927–2003)

- Alan Reiher in 1978

Director-General of the Department of Works
- In office 29 August 1967 – 30 November 1973

Secretary of the Department of Housing and Construction
- In office 30 November 1973 – 22 December 1975

Secretary of the Department of Construction
- In office 22 December 1975 – 20 April 1976

Personal details
- Born: Alan Silvius Reiher; 13 June 1927 Melbourne, Victoria
- Died: 3 August 2003 (aged 76) Queensland
- Resting place: North Tamborine Cemetery, Queensland
- Education: University of Melbourne
- Occupation: Public servant

Alan Silvius Reiher (13 June 1927 – 3 August 2003) was a senior Australian public servant, best known for his time as Director-General of Works in the Australian Government bureaucracy and for heading government transport agencies in New South Wales and Victoria.

== Life and career ==
Alan Reiher was born in Melbourne on 13 June 1927 to Silvius Thomas Reiher and Agnes Marion Reiher.

Having graduated from the University of Melbourne with a civil engineering degree, Reiher commenced his Australian Public Service career in 1957 as an Engineer in the Department of Works. He spent a year at the Harvard Business School soon before being appointed Director-General of the department in 1967.

In 1975 while Secretary of the Department of Housing and Construction, Reiher was appointed as a member of the Darwin Reconstruction Authority in the aftermath of Cyclone Tracy.

He was appointed the Chief Commissioner of the New South Wales Public Transport Commission in March 1976 succeeding Philip Shirley. The appointment was in the last weeks of the Wills Government, and the Labor Party opposed his appointment, which was for seven years.

After being placed on fully paid leave by Minister for Transport Peter Cox, who claimed Reiher had caused him embarrassment by failing to inform him of an agreement with the unions in March 1980, Reiher resigned.

In 1980 he was appointed Chairman of the Victorian Railways Board, and in 1982 he became Director-General of Transport for Victoria.

Beginning in 1986 for five years, Reiher was Victoria's Commissioner in North America. Reiher died on 3 August 2003.

Government offices
Preceded by George Maunder	Director-General of the Department of Works; 1967 – 1973	Succeeded by Himself as Secretary of the Department of Housing and Construction
Preceded by James Nimmo as Secretary of the Department of Housing	Secretary of the Department of Housing and Construction; 1973 – 1975	Succeeded by Himself as Secretary of the Department of Construction
Preceded by Himself as Secretary of the Department of Works	Secretary of the Department of Housing and Construction; 1973 – 1975	Succeeded by Bob Lansdown as Secretary of the Department of Environment, Housing and Community Development
Preceded by Himself as Secretary of the Department of Housing and Construction	Secretary of the Department of Construction; 1975 – 1976	Succeeded by George Warwick Smith
