= James Nimmo =

James Nimmo CBE

Secretary of the Department of Housing
- In office 17 December 1963 – 30 November 1973

Personal details
- Born: James Ferguson Nimmo; 1912
- Died: 15 December 1984 (aged 72) Royal Canberra Hospital
- Education: University of Melbourne (MA)
- Occupation: Public servant

James Ferguson Nimmo CBE (1912 – 15 December 1984) was a senior Australian public servant and policy maker, best known for his time as Secretary of the Department of Housing.

== Life and career ==
James Nimmo was born in 1912. He attended Geelong College and then the University of Melbourne. Whilst in his final year of university (studying economics), he worked for Lyndhurst Giblin as a research secretary.

Moving to Canberra in 1935 to take up a temporary appointment at the Bureau of Census and Statistics. He was awarded a permanent position in 1938, after a short period of study at the London School of Economics. His career over the next couple of decades included a period of time at the Rationing Commission and then later in the Treasury. From 1958 to 1960 he headed the banking, trade and industry branch of the Treasury.

Between 1960 and 1963, Nimmo was a Deputy Secretary in the Prime Minister's Department. Then from 1963 to 1973, he was Secretary of the Department of Housing.

In December 1973, Nimmo was appointed a Member of the Commonwealth Grants Commission.

Nimmo was Commissioner of an Inquiry into Transport to and from Tasmania. He submitted the Report of the Commission of Inquiry into Transport to and from Tasmania in 1976, and it became known as the Nimmo Report.

Nimmo died at the Royal Canberra Hospital on 15 December 1984.

== Awards ==
Nimmo was made an Officer of the Order of the British Empire in June 1963 while a Deputy Secretary in the Prime Minister's Department. He was promoted to Commander of the Order in June 1966 while Secretary of the Department of Housing.

Government offices
Preceded by Bill Boswell as Secretary of the Department of National Development	Secretary of the Department of Housing; 1963 – 1973	Succeeded by Alan Reiher as Secretary of the Department of Housing and Construction
