= Department of Housing =

Australian government department, 1963–1973

Department overview
- Formed: 17 December 1963
- Preceding Department: Department of National Development (I)
- Dissolved: 30 November 1973
- Superseding Department: Department of Housing and Construction (I)
- Jurisdiction: Commonwealth of Australia
- Employees: 1300 (at October 1973)
- Ministers responsible: Les Bury, Minister (1963–1966); Annabelle Rankin, Minister (1966–1971); Kevin Cairns, Minister (1971–1972); Gough Whitlam, Minister (1972); Les Johnson, Minister (1972–1973)
- Department executive: James Nimmo, Secretary

The Department of Housing was an Australian government department with responsibility for housing, including the administration of housing schemes and grants that existed between December 1963 and November 1973.

== Structure ==
The Department was a Commonwealth Public Service department, staffed by officials who were responsible to the Minister for Housing. When Annabelle Rankin was appointed the Minister of the department in 1966 she became the first woman to administer an Australian government department.
