= Victorian Railways hopper wagons =

Freight wagons in Australia

- Operators: Victorian Railways and successors

Specifications
- Track gauge: 5 ft 3 in (1,600 mm), has operated on 4 ft 8 1/2 in (1,435 mm) standard gauge

The Victorian Railways in Australia have had a vast range of hopper-type wagons over the last century, for transporting various types of free-flowing dry goods including grains, fuel, and various powders.

== Design ==
As a general rule, a hopper wagon involves an open frame with sloped sheets, giving a wider area at the top and a smaller area at the bottom. The type of intended traffic usually guides both the slopes and whether or not the wagon has a roof to keep the freight dry (for example, with cement or grain wagons). Later designs experimented with pressurised drums to store various powdered goods, pumped into and out of the wagons using external high-pressure air supplies. The traffic will also dictate the design of the unloading mechanism for the wagon, as usually found between the axles.

=== Ownership ===
In the last eight days of the 1982/83 financial year the Victorian Government arranged a sale-and-lease-back deal covering 560 VicRail hopper wagons; the sale was for A$30,000,000 and the lease was raised in Dutch guilders, to Dominguez and Barry Financial Services Limited. The wagon classes were not specified in Newsrail at the time, but assuming only bogie type rolling stock was considered for the sale deal it most likely was comprised primarily of the VHGX/Y, 1966 cement and flour type, and 1974 gravity discharge type classes,

== 1870 and 1915 fixed-wheel, open-top hopper wagons ==
=== Original fleet ===
The first open-top hopper wagons were introduced around 1870. Forty wagons were built with 10-ton capacity, and used to transport imported coal from the Williamstown, Geelong and Port Melbourne to locomotive depots in the Melbourne area. The first forty were all marked off register in 1910.

=== Open wagon fleet ===
A further 20 open wagons were built in 1881–1883, but shared the O class and continued the number range up to O60. These wagons were marked for traffic in the Williamstown area, likely only for short-distance work from the Pier to the adjacent locomotive depot and workshops. These were scrapped in 1891–1892; the exception was O54, apparently retained at least until 1897.

=== 1878 type ===
Forty-four hopper wagons were acquired during the takeover of the Melbourne and Hobson's Bay Railway Company in 1878, and these were identified by the Victorian Railways as O61-O104. They were scrapped by 1889, and replaced with new vehicles recycling their numbers. The Victorian Railways also constructed hopper wagons O105-O154 in 1886–1887 (including two O153's), followed by O155-O209 in 1889–1890. O23 was marked off register circa 1885, and a new O23 was built in 1890 to the new design. The second O153 was renumbered to O210 in 1891. With a handful of exceptions, the majority of this fleet was scrapped following the second world war. The older design was not suited for upgrading to automatic couplers.

=== 15-ton fleet ===
A new open hopper wagon design was introduced from 1915, with a steel underframe. These were called the "standard" fleet, and were fitted with pin-latched drop doors. O211-O260 were built in 1915–1916, followed by O261-O335 in 1919–1920, to accelerate delivery of coal from the Wonthaggi state mine, opened in 1909. The mine was used to overcome supply issues due to miner strikes in New South Wales. Later wagons were built to bring coal from Yallourn, which was mined to generate power at Newport for the Melbourne suburban electrified system.

The final wagons were built in 1923, numbered O334 to O388. Of those, 334–338 and 345 were built to a modified design to transport pulverised brown coal for locomotive trials; a single locomotive, C16, was modified to burn PBC, and the tender was fitted with a pressurised tank for storage. That tender was later transferred to engines D^{D}1022 and A^{2}800 to give data on consumption and efficiency with different types of work.

==== ON ballast wagons ====
From 1959, 75 of the 15-ton fleet of O wagons were randomly selected for conversion for ballast train use, and reclassed as ON. Between 1962 and 1968 some of the wagons were returned to the coal fleet, though they retained their ballast-wagon modifications. The remaining ON wagons were used for limestone traffic between Nowa Nowa and Maryvale.

==== OC sand wagons ====
From the early 1960s, a group of roughly 100 wagons, pulled from both the O and ON sub-groups, were fitted with roofs and sprayed internally with an anti-stick compound, for transport of sand from Koala siding near Lang Lang, to a glass factory in Spotswood. Original numbers were retained.

==== OJ cement wagon ====
In 1966, ON229 was converted to the new class OJ, as an experimental cement powder wagon. The trials were deemed unsuccessful, and within a year it had been transferred back to Newport Workshops for conversion to OC229.

== 1901 NN → VHWA/VZMA) ==
As bogie vehicles became more popular, VR decided to expand the concept into freight transport. The ideal choice for experimentation was a little-used, but very important class of wagon, used for ballasting the track but otherwise having little to no use.

=== Ex-NN fleet ===
Around 1920, a concept was floated to use hoppers from the NN ballast fleet of wagons to build a higher-capacity type of O wagon. Five hoppers were recycled in this way, becoming the second O1-O5, before the project was cancelled.

== 1910 QN → VHNA/VZNA ==
From 1910, another type of ballast wagon was constructed. Known as QN from the start and given numbers 1 to 121, the class construction continued until 1926. The wagons were initially dual-purpose, with a small hopper embedded in the centre of the floor, but with raised sides and ends and steel plates across the floor for carriage of rails and other maintenance materials. Rail carrying probably only continued until the 1950s, with the introduction of KR rail-carrying trucks – four-wheel underframes fitted so that rails could be welded together into longer sections and placed across a number of wagons, flexing as the train ran around curves.

== 1925 J series (open hopper) and 1951 Box-type series ==
=== J series (ballast, briquettes, coal, grain) ===
In 1925, the South Australian Railways was part-way through an order for a large number of coal wagons. The Victorian Railways decided to make use of the situation and chose to experiment with the wagon style, by tacking 12 40-ton capacity wagons on to the SAR order. The 12 wagons were imported as kits from the American Car and Foundry Co., delivered to Newport Workshops and assembled there then released to traffic over a seventeen-day period late in 1925. The order from ACF Co. included two each of the 40-ton capacity E open, V louvre and S flat wagons, all of which the SAR purchased larger quantities.

The VR intended to use these wagons for slack coal traffic between the State Coal Mine (Wonthaggi) and Newport Power Station. However they were found to be unsuitable for this, probably because of the rather shallow angles of the hoppers which resulted in discharge issues.

Because the wagons were failures in their intended traffic, some other use had to be found for them. In the 1920s they were used for ballast, then they spent a short time in briquette traffic in the late 1930s, then coal traffic in the 1940s again between Wonthaggi and Maryvale (reversing at Dandenong). They returned to ballast traffic by the 1950s.

Another experiment was conducted in 1957 with J 8 being given a temporary roof as a trial for grain transport, but it is reasonable to assume that all of these experiments were failures; in 1959 J 8 became the first of its class to be converted to CJ format in 1959, followed closely by 12, 11, 10, 6, 7, 9, 1, 4, 5, 3 and 2 over the following two years. Respectively, these conversions were to CJ 51–54 and 80–87.

=== CJ, CJF, VHCA (cement), VHJA (Gypsum), VHLA (lime) & VHCF (weighbridge test) ===
From 1950, it was found that more capacity was required for cement powder transport from Fyansford to Bandiana for the Kiewa Hydroelectric scheme. To answer the call, a class of wagons was constructed and it became known as the CJ class. Deliveries occurred at a rate of roughly 1–2 wagons per month until CJ 20 was delivered in mid-July 1952. Further wagons were delivered in two batches, with 21–30 arriving 1954–1955, and 31–97 arriving 1957–1961.

The wagons were effectively a flat underframe, fitted with a large covered box. The box contained two pairs of sloped sheets so that the cement powder was carried in two separate compartments; each of these fed a single hatch adjacent to the bogies. This gave capacity for just over 1,300 cubic feet (37 m^{3}) of cement powder, equalling roughly 43 long tons (44 t; 48 short tons) loaded.

While the class members were mostly identical, there were a few outliers. During the last batch of deliveries, it was becoming clear that the wagons would not arrive in time to meet demand, so J (1925) hoppers were rebuilt into the CJ design; as such, wagons CJ 51–54 and 80–87 were converted from the abovementioned J hoppers. In this form the converted wagons had a rather odd appearance, as though someone had dropped the CJ-type wagon body into the hopper unit of the J wagons.

Eventually the wagons had their roofs raised; CJ 6 and 14 were the trials for this, but it is not known by how much the capacity or weight of the wagons was increased.

From 1966 to 1968, the capacity for CJ wagons was raised and the vehicles were recoded to CJF. In order to achieve this, wagons 6 and 14 had their roofs raised in a Mansard-style as a trial; they were the only two wagons to receive this treatment, which raised their capacity to 1,530 cubic feet (43 m^{3}). The rest of the class had a different style of roof fitted, with their capacity being raised to 1,650 cubic feet (47 m^{3}). The modified wagons 6 and 14 had a tare weight of around 20 long tons (20 t; 22 short tons), with the capacity during the conversions raised from 43 to 50 long tons (44 to 51 t; 48 to 56 short tons). The modifications to the remainder of the regular CJ fleet allowed a capacity of either 51 or 54 long tons (52 or 55 t; 57 or 60 short tons) depending on the quality of bogie, while the wagons previously converted from J hoppers were restricted to 50 long tons (51 t; 56 short tons) because of their 22-long-ton (22 t; 25-short-ton) tare weight.

However, shortly after the class relettering had been completed it was found that the brakes fitted to the bogies were not powerful enough (against a loaded CJF) to qualify for the 'F' classification, thus from 1968 to 1972 most of the wagons were returned to their previous CJ codes. At this time CJ 16 and 46 accidentally swapped numbers.

After the Kiewa Hydroelectric scheme was completed, the only traffic available for the class was from Fyansford to the Arden Street sidings in Melbourne; this was run as a block train.

==== Changes from 1979 ====
In the statewide 1979 freight recodings, the wagons became known as VHCA (Victoria, Hopper, Cement, 70 km/h (43 mph) limit); the entire class, save for 9, 52 and 58, survived to have this new code applied. The first wagons recoded were 15 and 37 on 6 April 1979 at Newport Workshops, and the last was number 7 on 28 August 1987 at Ballarat Workshops.

===== VHLA Limestone traffic =====
In 1981, VHCA 83 (previously J1) was modified and recoded to VHLA 1, for the transport of limestone. To achieve this the top of the wagon was cut off, and the remaining hopper unit had steeper sloped sheets added; while this reduced capacity of the wagon, it also would have accelerated the dumping procedure. It was used for traffic between Nowa Nowa and the Maryvale paper mill, but either traffic was limited or the experiment was a failure, as the wagon was cut up in May 1983.

===== VHJA Gypsum traffic =====
In 1984, the ten remaining VHCA wagons ex J series hoppers (51, 53, 54, 81, 82 and 84–87) were removed from that fleet and reclassed to VHJA 1–10 for gypsum traffic. The covered roof was removed and replaced with a vertically extended box structure, hiding extended and steeper sloped sheets – like the VHLA, this was to assist in quick unloading, but in this case the extension was provided so the wagons could be loaded to the same total weight as previously. In the late 1980s, some of these wagons were seen in briquette traffic, but by 1993 there was clearly justification for the class as a further 15 VHCA (normal type) wagons were converted, bringing the new total to 25.

J	CJ/VHCA	VHJA	VHLA
01	83		01
02	87	09	
03	86	07	
04	84	06	
05	85	10	
06	80	01	
07	81	04	
08	51	02	
09	82	05	
10	54	03	
11	53	08	
12	52		

Wagons 11 to 16 were converted from VHCA 35, 46, 42, 22, 15 and 24; VHJA 19 came from VHCA 13, and VHJA 25 came from VHCA 95. It is not clear which VHCA wagons were used for VHJA 17, 18 and 20–24, though candidates would have been VHCA 17, 18, 36, 41, 57, 62, 65, 71 and/or 79.

The remaining wagons, VHCA28, 48, 61, 63, 64, 66, 67, are known to have been scrapped in the mid-1980s.

===== VHCA alterations =====
By 1987, most of the remaining VHCA wagons were fitted with ride control bogies – numbers 1–38, 55–80 and 88–97, excluding wagons 28, 29, 32 and 37.

In 1989, sixty wagons of the class were modified at Ballarat North Workshops; they were fitted with air operated pistons to operate the sliding discharge doors at the bottom of the hopper; and flow plates were fitted to the inside sloped walls to allow aerating of the cement powder to facilitate better discharge.

In 1994, VHCA 10 was seen with an advert for Geelong Cement on the sides; the fleet had never previously had anything other than paint and lettering on the sides.

VHCA 55 was seen at Ararat in 1995, painted in the then-new V/Line Freight grey livery, with the title placed on a long, thin billboard. It had been repainted at Bendigo North Workshops, possibly in November that year. Since that time the wagons have seen little use, many being stored at Tottenham Yard. VHCA 55 was last seen at Tottenham, still in the abovementioned scheme, in 2004.

==== Withdrawal ====
In June 1997, the Fyansford cement plant was purchased, and the new owners elected to use their own fleet of trucks instead of the VHCA fleet. As a result, the wagons were no longer needed. 11 were stored at Tottenham Yard, and another 49 on the south leg of the triangle at North Shore Yard. In 1998, the North Shore wagons were relocated to a siding parallel to the mainline. On Friday 26 June the same year, G525 collected the wagons from both North Shore (along with 15 VHSF wagons) and Tottenham Yard, and placed them on the disused Outside Goods Lines in Melbourne Yard; that alignment is now used partially for the Regional Rail Link lines between the 1961 North Melbourne Flyover, and Spion Kop Junction.

At the end of March 2001 the last of the gypsum VHJA wagons were removed from the Alauda siding at Tottenham Yard for scrapping, as VHJX wagons were being used instead for the Cowangie gypsum traffic.

==== VHCF weighbridge test wagons ====
In late 2001 ten wagons were recycled as VHCF wagons for weighbridge testing. By May 2003 they had been placed in storage at Tottenham Yard.

==== Long-term storage ====
As at Thursday 8 May 2003, the northern track contained wagons, listed from the Spencer St end, 16V, 76A, 32B, 78S, 7W, 88D and 55V then 50W, 75Y, 77J, 72K, 74F, 33K, 26G, 8X, 93M, 94V, 73T, 97C, 31P, 69T, 27P, 45N, 19C, 6N and 89M (26 wagons). The southern track had 1Y, 37A, 90X, 70P, 68K, 49D and 47X, then 34T, 15M, 11W, 21H, 4S, 38J, 30G, 59L, 14D, 56H, 5E, 20W, 60H, 40Y and 92D (22 wagons). The gaps were for the staff pathway to access the North Melbourne maintenance centre. All wagons were mounted on either VXB or VXC bogies.

As at Wednesday 28 May 2003, Tottenham Yard contained, from the Footscray end – on the north side of the 2nd classification tracks: VHCF2U (80.2 t), VHCF12F (80.3 t), VHCF44B (81.7 t), VHCF3G (65.6 t), VHCF10K (64 t), VHCF91Y (65.6 t), VHCF39P (36.2 t), VHCF43P (23.2 t), VHCF29H (36.2 t), VHCF96N (21.8 t), for 10 wagons. Two additional wagons had recently been moved from the Outside Goods Lines to Tottenham Yard, and placed in a siding on the north side of the east yard; VHCA23C at the Footscray end coupled to VHCA25U at the Sunshine end.

== 1949 Two-Drum Air Discharge Hoppers ==
=== Pulverised brown coal ===
After dealing with coal shortages during World War II and the immediate post-war era, the Victorian Railways reactivated earlier experiments with Precipitated Brown Coal. Locomotives X32 and R707 were modified to take the fuel, which was prepared at special plants and railed to depots as required in a small fleet of seven CK-class wagons. These vehicles were based on a standard four-wheel underframe, with two pressurised drums fitted for air discharge directly into the engine tenders. The first two were built in 1949, and a further five, CK3-CK7, entered service in 1952. At the time it was thought that a further fifteen X Class would be built or converted to run with PBC, justifying the extra expense, but the early diesel locomotives were more economic to operate on grounds of higher utilisation.

=== Cement ===
In 1958, with the abandonment of the PBC program, the wagons were converted to transport cement powder, using a similar air discharge system. The wagons were reclassed "X". A further 20 wagons were built in the period 1959–1960 using shorter drums, followed by a further 50 wagons with taller drums until 1962. Of the final batch wagons J41 and J42 were constructed in July 1960 with notches cut out along the sides, likely to clear a particular overhead loading mechanism. In 1963 the letter "X" became reserved for bogie vehicles capable of switching between broad and standard gauge, so the four-wheel hoppers were reclassed "J".

The hoppers typically operated from Fyansford, near Geelong, to sites around Melbourne as required. For example, wagons were unloaded at Victoria Park for construction of the Eastern Freeway, and construction of the Melbourne Underground Rail Loop saw the wagons unloaded in the vicinity of Jolimont Junction.

=== Flour ===
In 1961–62, as the last of the new fleet of dedicated cement hoppers were being delivered, the original batch of ex-pulverised brown coal hoppers were recycled for new powdered flour traffic. The wagons formerly CK1-7 then X1-7 became FX1-7; in 1963 that changed to FJ1-7 to clear the "X" code for bogie-exchange-capable vehicles.

Three further vehicles were converted from the J series cement fleet in 1964–65, with J45, 47 and 46 becoming FJ 8–10. In 1967, this was followed with the two notched-drum wagons, J41 and 42, becoming FJ11 and 12.

The vehicles were known to be loaded at Albury and unloaded at Westall, though FJ9 was painted advertising flour from the Jacketts mill in Swan Hill The vast majority of published photos are of wagons at Westall.

In 1971–72, the fixed-wheel fleet was rendered obsolete, with the introduction of four-drum bogie flour wagons, and converted (back) to the J series for cement use. FJ 8 and 9 were retained until the late 1980s, and were noted as stored in 1992.

=== Models ===
Austrains has released models of cement and flour hoppers in sets of three, representing the 28–77 batch of the former type and numbers 1, 6, 7, 8, 10, 11 and possibly others of the flour type. No models have been commercially released of the precipitated brown coal hoppers.

== 1959 & 1979 former open wagons ==
=== Prototype G1 ===
Until the 1960s, unbagged grain traffic was handled with the GY fleet of open wagons, which could be filled from overhead chutes but needed to be shovelled out by hand.

To accelerate the process a hopper design was trialled, with the prototype wagon being constructed in 1959.

The new hopper wagon was specifically designed for to meet the requirements of the Grain Elevator Board for bulk wheat haulage from around the state to North Geelong terminal and silos, and it was constructed using a welded hopper body with flat ends and a pitched roof, fitted with four weather-proofing hatches, accessible by ladders at either end. The wagon had a carrying capacity of 26 long tons (26 t), and a tare weight of 10 long tons 19 cwt 3 qtr (11.16 t) Labelled G1, the wagon was trialled for nineteen months before being labelled a failure and relegated to long-term storage.

The primary issue was the unloading rate; it was found that the grain flowing from under the wagon overloaded standard conveyor belt systems when they transferred the grain to silos (such as Thomas' Mill just north of Newport) or ships at piers.

The wagon was scrapped in 1971.

=== GH wagons ===
In the late 1970s, funding for the bogie grain wagon construction program was drying up, while demand for rolling stock with faster loading and unloading times was increasing. Additionally the Victorian Railways had a long-held tradition of restoring and upgrading existing rolling stock, rather than purchasing new vehicles, because that allowed funding to be sourced from maintenance budgets rather than new allocations from the Government (regardless of whether that would provide a better long-term outcome). That attitude persisted throughout the early VicRail years.

In line with that tradition, from 1979 roughly one in eight of the GY open wagons were selected for conversion to a smaller version of the bogie hopper wagons. GY2207 was modified in March 1979; the sides and ends were removed and a large hole cut into the floor between the axles, to make way for a new hopper unit on the existing underframe with under-floor hatches for unloading. The top of the wagon was sealed, with a trapezoidal roof and walkways fitted for staff who had to open hatches for overhead grain loading. The class eventually numbered 810 units, drawn from all types of steel four-wheel open wagons.

Like G1 before them, the original GH fleet were fitted with four hatches – two per side, between the axles and either side of the brake gear along the centre of the underframe. This made access to the brakes unwieldy, and the four hatches released grain too quickly for the conveyor belt systems. To resolve both issues later wagons were built with only two hatches, centred one either side which halved the grain delivery rate and made access to the brake rigging much easier. GH150 and GH151 were constructed with alternative braking arrangements, by cutting a small enclave in underneath one end of the hopper and placing the brake equipment there. Some further wagons were modified, but many (including some then under construction) only had the cut-out section constructed without shifting the brake equipment.

Parallel to the hopper and brake gear modifications a new arrangement of roof hatches was trialled. The early wagons were fitted with a pair of individual flip-open lids, while later wagons were fitted with a single, much longer rooftop hatch mounted on six hinges.

The addition of the roof section permitted a higher payload of grain, but between that and the weight of the roof, hopper sheets and hatch mechanisms, a GH wagon was significantly heavier than a standard tarped GY wagon. This led to problems with brakes, as the original braking systems for the lighter vehicles were retained. Further, wagons developed cracks in the frames not long after entering service, in the corners above the axlebox spring supports.

The final variant was to wagon GH800. Rather than using a steel fabricated rooftop, that wagon had a specially cast fibreglass shell constructed and attached, with the intent of reducing the tare weight low enough to avoid frame cracking. However, with introduction in 1982 the modification came too late to have any particular significance, and no other wagons were so modified and the final nine GH wagons entered service using the earlier design.

In 1980, two wagons were modified for higher speed operation trials. GH155 and GH336 were fitted with new Gloucester Suspension Unit axleboxes, and trialled at speeds as high as 115 km/h. Given that no further wagons were fitted, it seems likely that the tests showed little to no benefit from faster running.

These vehicles were rendered obsolete by new bogie grain wagons introduced from the late 1980s; scrapping continued until the early 1990s making this class one of the last fixed-wheel vehicles to run in revenue service on the V/Line network.

As at 1 November 1987, "300 metres of GH wagons" (about 40 wagons) were stored out of use on the closed Cohuna branch line beyond Elmore railway station.

=== FH wagons ===
In December 1982, one of the planned GH conversions was reallocated to superphosphate traffic. The design was similar, but with steeper sloped sheets forming the hopper.

Externally the wagon was largely identical to the grain wagons, but painted brown, coded FH1 and marked for superphosphate traffic. In May of the following year a further five wagons were converted to match. They were used for traffic between Corio and Wodonga until the early 1990s.

== 1963 Drum series (pneumatic discharge) ==
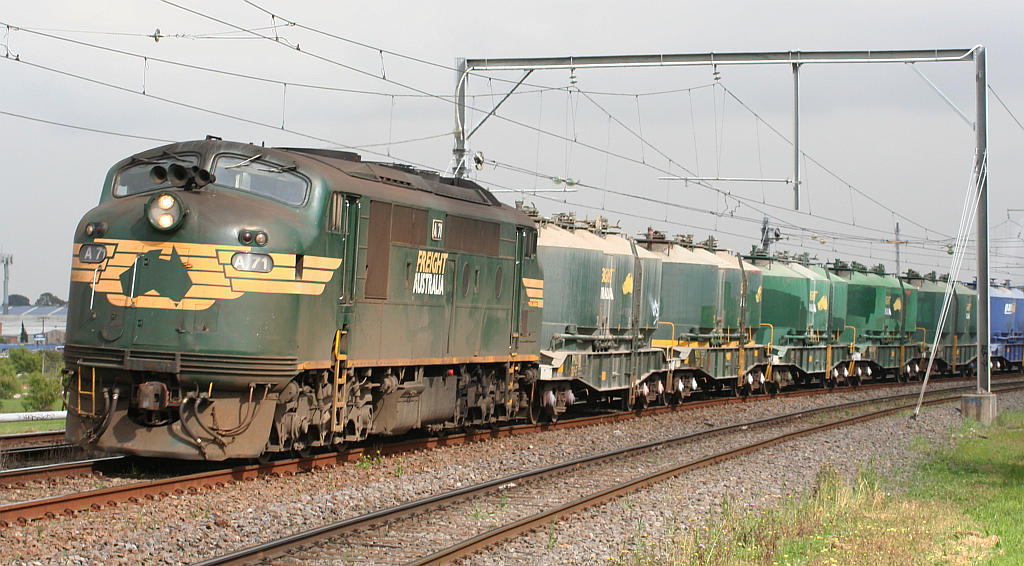
Cement train from Lyndhurst at Newport South in 2006, composed of 1963-style hopper wagons

Around the same time as the CJ series were being built with gravity-discharge systems, a separate series of longer-bodied wagons were constructed with vertical drums and pneumatic discharge; these were originally intended for cement traffic, but later on similar wagons were used for flour, lime and sand traffic. The wagons involved were the JX (three drums) and FX (four drums), later becoming the VPAX/BX/CX and VPFX respectively. Later conversions, all from the VPFX class, created the VPLX and VZGX varieties for carrying lime and specially dried locomotive sand respectively.

=== JX & VPAX/BX/CX ===
The JX wagons were constructed from 1963 to 1977, with wagon numbers 1 to 108 being built in two batches. The wagons were all recoded to VPCX in 1979, and a further batch in 1981–82 took the class to 158 total. The three batches were later separated by the air pressure required for discharge, with batch 59–108 becoming VPAX and 109–158 becoming VPBX. Traffic was from Fyansford cement plant (near Geelong) to Somerton in Melbourne's north, where Blue Circle had built a holding depot. From here the cement was discharged, then distributed by road. It was also expected that cement could be purchased overseas and taken over water to Sydney, then railed to the same Somerton depot.

The later group of wagons was built in anticipation of the construction of the new Parliament House in Canberra. This was achieved with block trains running regularly from Somerton to Canberra on the standard gauge line.

=== FX, VPFX, VPLX & VZGX ===
In 1966, around the same time as the first JX wagons were being constructed, a handful of components were used to build the first two FX wagons for flour transport. These were successful and were joined by FX 3 and 4 by the end of the year. In 1970–71 the class was increased to 17, though these were built to a slightly different design, with only one discharge pipe instead of three. By 1978 the earlier wagons had been modified to match the later design. In 1979 the code was altered to VPFX.

The main area of traffic was from the Bunge Flour Mills at Albury to the discharge point at Williamstown Pier. Another was from the Bridgewater Flour mill to Melbourne.

In 1989, a need was generated for lime transport, to be added to cement batches. To achieve this, VPFX wagons 2, 3, 6 and 11 were converted to VPLX in 1989–1990, and joined by VPLX 14 in 1993. Finally, in 1990 wagons 1, 4 and 17 were converted to carry specially dried sand for locomotive transport, and recoded to VZGX.

Unlike the majority of Victorian Railways rolling stock, the flour wagons found themselves painted silver with ◅--VR--▻ symbols, "Bunge" and "Bulk Flour" text in black originally, later trading the silver for white. They were also often covered with advertising for various flour companies such as "Bunge", "Water Wheel" or "KMM Pty., Ltd. O-So-Lite".

All seventeen former-FX wagons were included in the sale from V/Line Freight to Freight Victoria in 1999, as VZGX 1, 4 and 17, VLPX 2, 3, 6, 11 and 14, and VPFX 5, 7, 8, 9, 10, 12, 13, 15 and 16. At the time the three VZGX wagons were marked as having zero asset value. VPFX10 was painted green by 2000.

Of the three sand wagons, VZGX1Q remained in Victorian Railways' silver, VZGX4U was white with V/LINE logos, and VZGX17J was painted in Freight Australia green. In 2010 both 1 and 17 were stabled in North Geelong yard, and 4 was at Tottenham yard. Wagons 5, 6, 7 and 11 were scrapped in 2010, as part of a project by Pacific National to clear redundant rolling stock from the North Melbourne Arrivals Yard and Tottenham Yard areas. Other wagons 8, 9, 13 and 15 were photographed at North Geelong in 2007/ All three classes were removed from V/Line's list of rolling stock operated by Pacific National in 2024.

== 1966 Grain series ==
=== GJX/F & VHGF/X/Y (grain) ===
From the late 1960s, it was finally being realised that, in particular, manual loading and unloading of GY four-wheeled wagons was getting too expensive. In response to the issue, development of a different, extended type of hopper wagon took place, finally resulting in the GJX and, later, the GJF wagons (later recoded to VHGX/Y/F). The wagons were nearly twice as efficient as their four-wheeled cousins when comparing wagon weight to load.

==== Design ====
The wagons, with their semi-automatic unloading systems, were used for transport of grain from major terminals (such as Marmalake and Dunolly) to the seaports at Geelong and Portland; the majority of the four-wheeled wagons were retained for use from the hundreds of country silos to the abovementioned grain terminals. This was done to ensure that the newest wagons earned their keep as quickly as possible, in addition to the fact that some of the older branch lines did not have the capability to carry wagons as heavy as a fully loaded GJX, at 55 long tons (55.9 t; 61.6 short tons) compared to a GY's 22 long tons (22.4 t; 24.6 short tons) maximum payload.

===== Tulloch aluminium hoppers =====
The first order of wagons was for 100 bogie grain hoppers constructed with aluminium shells, to be built by Tulloch Limited. The order was signed in October 1965, with the wagons being built at the Rhodes factory. The wagons' design was a collaboration between Tulloch, Australuco acting on behalf of Alcan, and the Victorian Railways, with the intent that the wagons would operate on either broad or standard gauge as required. The first vehicle ran to Melbourne in January 1966, being loaded en-route at Culcairn in New South Wales. A ceremony was held in Melbourne at the Dynon bogie exchange centre on 2 February 1966. The last of the batch entered service on 24 December 1966.

The aluminium wagons started as unpainted silver but weathered to a dark grey quite quickly, to the point of almost obscuring the black "VR" logos emblazoned on the sides. They also suffered from cracking and required modifications to the design. The steel wagons were far more successful.

It was quickly found that other states used the gauge conversion capability of the wagons to their advantage, and quite often grain wagons of this type would vanish beyond the border, only reappearing when in need of repair. In response all but 11 wagons (numbers 1, 3-5, 8, 10-11, 17-20) were recoded in 1972-1973 from GJX to GJF, with the relevant equipment removed to lock them to broad gauge operations only. Later in 1972 the divide was simplified with GJX covering wagons 1-20 and GJF 21-100.

In the Railways of Australia 1979 recoding the GJX wagons became VHGX, and the GJF wagons became VHGY, except GJF81 which was wrecked in 1977 and scrapped at Bendigo Workshops the following year.

===== West Footscray order =====
Following the issues encountered with the Tulloch wagons, construction of the next batch of bogie grain hoppers was awarded to a Victorian firm, Steelweld Industrial Engineering in West Footscray. These entered service between October 1968 and September 1969. The appearance of the vehicles when first entering service is not known, but all photos from the 1970s show them painted yellow with a large black "VR" symbol on the sides.

As with the aluminium wagons, steel wagons GJX101-200 were recoded GJF in 1972.

In the Railways of Australia 1979 recoding the GJF wagons became VHGY.

===== Newport Workshops order =====
From 1972, the fleet was further expanded. Wagons GJF201-350 were constructed at Newport Workshops between January and October 1972. These wagons all entered service painted yellow with a large black VR logo on each side.

In the Railways of Australia 1979 recoding the GJF wagons became VHGY.

===== Ballarat Workshops order =====
From 1979 more orders were placed, this time with Ballarat North Workshops. Thirty wagons were delivered as VHGY351-380 in July and August 1979, followed by VHGY381 in September 1984 through VHGY450 in December 1985, and VHGY451 to 637 over the period to May 1988. The latter batch of wagons are known to have been delivered as VHGY as far as VHGY505, but at some point thereafter the code changed to VHGF to reflect updated rules established by the Railways of Australia committee. Check letters, to confirm a wagon's identity had been correctly entered into computer terminals, were established around 1983 but application was spotty and photos exist c.1987 both with and without them.

Newsrail (September 1987) reported that the "current batch" of hoppers would go up to VHGY632, so it is possible that the final five were an extension of the order. By mid-1987 2,800 open-top GY wagons had been scrapped, and the delivery of the 632nd VHGY/F wagon, in conjunction with the VHHY hoppers, was expected to be sufficient to allow withdrawal of the GH fixed-wheel hopper fleet during 1988.

The 1979 batch entered service in yellow with the letters VR on the side, but later-built wagons had "V/LINE GRAIN" in black with a green forward-slash instead.

==== In service ====
Each new hopper replaced seven GY open wagons, by combining the increased capacity, decreased weight, and faster loading, unloading and run times made possible with the modern design. Vincent records entry-to-service dates as far as VHGY450 at the end of 1985, plus VHGF636 and 637 in mid-1988. All wagons 1979 and onwards were constructed at Ballarat North Workshops, with a delivery rate of about three per week. Of the final batch, by 23 May 1987 49 wagons had entered service, and a further 11 by 30 June 1987.

The bogie hoppers gradually expanded their field of operation as line upgrades took place; for instance the first movement north of Mildura was on 10 April 1987, with 56 hoppers being used to convey a crop of sunflower seeds from Yelta. This was only practical because the density of sunflower seeds is less than that of grain, enough that the bogie hoppers could be fully loaded while remaining below the weight limit of the track.

During the 1990s a number of hoppers were reclassed or otherwise re-purposed. Around 1994-1995, about thirty-five wagons randomly selected from the 200-and-above series were recoded VHGX for use on the newly-opened standard gauge line between Melbourne and Adelaide. Also from 1995 the yellow livery was superseded by a new design, with grey for the body, orange on the side-sill and white "V/LINE FREIGHT" text, still with the green slash. Some wagons had that livery on one side only, with the other side in various colours advertising specific users of the fleet such as the Australian Barley Board or Carlton & United Breweries.

From 1997 at least a third of the aluminium hoppers were recoded for export rice traffic from the Echuca region. They became VHRX (numbers 1-20) or VHRF (21-100), and were painted in the normal V/Line Freight scheme, except that the operator branding was only applied on one side. The other side had "CARRYING AUSTRALIAN RICE TO THE WORLD FROM SUNRICE COUNTRY" written over three lines. Known numbers include 9, 10, 16, 18-19, 22, 25, 28, 30, 33, 36, 39-40, 43-44, 59-61, 65-67, 69-70, 72, 74, 76, 78, 83-84, 90, 95 and 98-99, but Bray and Vincent (2006) say that "There would have been others". No explanation is given in Bray and Vincent (2006) as to why the aluminium fleet were prioritised for this service. On the wagon sides without the full three lines of text, in at least some cases the recoding was carried out simply by replacing the "G" in the wagon code and the check letter. The code VHRX had previously been used for rutile wagons of the 1974 hopper type, but these had all been converted from cement wagons in 1988-1989 and went on to become quarry wagons in 1994.

The sale of V/Line Freight to Freight Victoria on 31 January 1999 included all VHGX/VHGF wagons, except 7, 11, 64, 68, 81, 88, 97, 116 and 567. At this time the VHGX number block covered wagons 1-6, 8-10, 12-20, plus 105, 108-109, 131, 146-147, 151, 161, 172, 177, 179-181, 187, 190, 196 and 198-199. No rice wagons were listed, which could mean incomplete asset management or that the rice traffic recoding was short-lived. Some VHRF wagons were included in the sale, sold as VHGF, but still running as VHRF as late as 2001 with the "V/LINE" part of the logo removed but the "FREIGHT" still in place. At least two VHRF wagons retained the code even after being repainted into the green livery of their new owner.

When V/Line Freight was sold to Rail America it started trading as Freight Victoria, later Freight Australia. In that company's service the hoppers were painted in dark grene with various arrangements of yellow stripes, occasionally retaining the "ABB" markings for the Australian Barley Board. A number of hoppers were fitted with modified braking and air-operated discharge doors, and recoded VHAF. When Freight Australia became Pacific National, the dark green was replaced with blue on an as-required basis; many wagons remained in green with the logos painted or patched over.

As of August 2026, Pacific National has wagons from this group classed in groups VHAF (numbers unspecified), VHGX1-20, VHGF21-100 and 101-637 listed separately, while Southern Shorthaul Railroad has nine hoppers coded either BGGX, BHGX or BHGY and in the number range 1091-1099. The code BHGY was also used at least once. The SSR hoppers were renumbered from wagons 306, 316, 255, 263, 424, 454, 490, 571 and 582 respectively.

=== VHHF/X/Y (grain) & VHEY/F (briquettes) ===
The wagons numbered 381–637 are a curiosity, because from 1982 to 1984 an improved design of wagon was released to service, known as the VHHY. These wagons were about 2 ft (0.61 m) longer and had an extra 10-long-ton (10.2 t; 11.2-short-ton) capacity over their predecessors, being able to carry 65 long tons (66.0 t; 72.8 short tons) each. The first three, 401, 412 and 414, were released to traffic in July 1982, but within a month they had been renumbered to 801, 812 and 814 respectively. By late 1984 the class had expanded to cover numbers 801–915.

At the same time as the VHHY class was being constructed, 35 additional wagons were constructed in the 701–735 range as VHEY for briquette transport; these were a similar design but open-topped, and these were the first G-series wagons in the traditional Victorian Railways Wagon Red (albeit well after the scheme's namesake had been abolished).

In 1985, wagons 801–812 inclusive were converted to briquette traffic as the VHEY class as numbers 736–747, but the conversions were not done in any particular order so numbers are mixed (i.e. 801 may not have become 736; records are not easily available). The modifications were limited to cutting off the roofs of the wagons and replacing the sliding-door hatches underneath the wagons with a single-door "clamshell" type.

Otherwise, from 1988 thirty ex-VHHY wagons became VHHX, while the remaining 73 wagons were relettered to VHHF. Following this the fleet was fairly stable up until the 1,435 mm (4 ft 8 1/2 in) standard gauge conversions in 1995/96 from Melbourne to Adelaide; as part of this project the by-then grain-only line from Dunolly to Portland was converted to standard gauge, necessitating a conversion of some of the VHGF wagons to VHGX. These numbers appear to have been selected at random, with no apparent pattern.

=== VHRF/X (rice) ===
Introduction of the VHHY class wagons allowed cascading of the older wagons for then-new rice traffic, developing in the north-eastern areas of the state; these wagons were coded VHRF/X. Records are hard to find but it appears a fairly random assortment of wagons were converted, totalling at least 23 wagons. Photographed wagons include 12 and 16 as VHRX and 22, 25, 27, 28, 30, 33, 36, 39, 40, 43, 44, 59–61, 65–67, 69, 70, 72 and 78 as VHRF; based on this it seems reasonable to assume that other conversions, if any, would have come from the aluminium-built group of wagons. Since the Pacific National takeover these wagons have all reverted to their previous grain classifications.

=== VHAF, VHLY, VHKY & VHNY (100t grain experiments) ===
In 1999, Freight Victoria, by then the operator of all Victorian freight trains, had expanded its grain operations to the Riverina areas of NSW; to facilitate this about 100 wagons from the post-1979 batches (selected fairly randomly) became VHAF; the new code represented their additional air-operated roof lids and discharge doors, operated by the main air-reservoir pipe (another group of ex JAF/X type wagons from the 1974 build also used this code).

Further conversions occurred in 2001–2003, when Freight Australia contracted ANI Bradken (Mittagong, NSW) to rebuild 22 of the VHEF class and 20 of the VHGF class to achieve a 100-long-ton (101.6 t; 112.0-short-ton) capacity; the former were rebuilt into VHNY-class 100-long-ton (101.6 t; 112.0-short-ton) grain wagons, becoming 1000–1021, while the latter kept their numbers (in the 230–296 range) but were reclassed to VHLY. The modifications were achieved by adding pneumatic roof hatches and discharge doors, strengthened side sills, a higher roof and stronger bogies. Around the same time, for comparison purposes, Alstom was contracted to new-build nine 100-long-ton (101.6 t; 112.0-short-ton) grain hoppers at its Ballarat North Workshops; these became VHKY 1151–1159.

Therefore, assuming the total of 637 GJX/F-style wagons is accurate, the total build of this series is 796 wagons over a 35-year timespan.

== 1974 J series (gravity discharge) ==
Letter	Traffic
A	Soda Ash
B	Briquettes
C	Cement
D	Dolomite
F	Fertiliser
J	Gypsum
M	Ballast (Maintenance)
P	Fertiliser (Phosphate)
Q	Quarry (rocks)
R	Rutile
S	Sand

A range of 190 wagons constructed to similar designs from 1974 with three-character codes. The first would always be a J, giving the class group. The second letter would be a different letter based on the intended traffic (i.e. A for soda ash giving JAF, B for briquettes giving JBF and so on), resulting in seven different classes. Finally, the third letter would be either an F or X; if F the wagon was allowed to run at 80 km/h (50 mph); if X the same, but it could also be bogie exchanged for running on standard and narrow gauge lines if the loading gauge/structure gauge permitted.

The initial build made up 155 wagons of seven classes; 35 JB, 30 JC, 40 JS, 20 JQ and 10 each for the JD, JA and JP classes. A further batch of wagons were built to the JBF design but by then with different codes, with 35 new wagons bringing the total to 190.

Initially the classes were to be released to service with an X as the final letter, but this changed for a short time between 1977 and 1978 when the Victorian Railways chose to remove the gauge-conversion facilities from a large portion of its fleet. This was a short-lived change, and the vast majority of wagons were back to being gauge-convertible by the next recoding period.

When these wagons were recoded in the 1979 ROA Recoding, they went to four-letter codes always starting with VH, for Victorian and Hopper-type respectively. The third letter would then indicate the traffic and mostly the letters stayed the same, though the letter F replaced P for fertiliser/phosphate traffic, as a code ending in PY was then used for passenger rollingstock. The fourth letter would either be F, indicating 80 km/h (50 mph) and non-bogie-exchangeable, X, indicating 80 km/h (50 mph) and Bogie Exchangeable, or Y indicating 115 km/h (71 mph), non-bogie-exchangeable. A change to the standard in the late 1980s required recoding from suffix "Y" to "F".

Conversions between the classes happened fairly regularly, as the centre unit of each wagon was very similar if not identical; the changes were mainly to the roof, if any, the discharge mechanism, and the addition or removal of plates over the ends, shielding the brake equipment. As a result, the latest set of modifications and not counting scrappings gives 57 wagons for quarry traffic, 65 ballast wagons, 33 fertiliser wagons and 35 sand wagons.

As at mid-1987, V/Line anticipated that by 1990 additional VHCX and VHMY woppers would be built, along with conversions from VHSX to VHCX and VHJY.

=== JAF & VHAF/Y (soda ash) ===
Built from late 1977, this variety of wagon was designed for the transport of soda ash, used in the manufacture of glass. The wagons were unloaded at the ICI glass plant at Yarraville. they were numbered 501 – 510 and given the code JAF to indicate J-series, Ash transport, Freight speeds (60 mph) allowed. The original plan was to use the code JAX, but this was rejected on the grounds of interstate operational issues.

From 1979, the class became VHAY; then, in 1987/88, the wagons was further reclassed to VHAF as the letter Y was deleted from the four-letter code system.

As the soda-ash traffic dried up, the wagons were modified and recoded for other uses; these modifications allowed the wagons to run in traffic carrying either cement or fertiliser. In the early 1990s, wagons VHAF 501–504, 508 and 510 became VHFF 611 to 616 in order; around the same time wagons 505, 506, 507 and 509 were reclassed to VHFX, numbers 21, 23, 20 and 22. By 1994, these had also been reclassed to VHFF, but they retained their VHFX numbers instead of being renumbered to the 600 range.

=== JBF & VHBY (briquettes) ===
Briquettes, combustible "biscuits" made by compressing brown coal dust under extreme pressure, had been produced in the Latrobe Valley since the late 1920s, using technology acquired from Germany following World War I.

Until the late 1970s, normal transport of these bricks was by standard four-wheeled I and IA wagons, which by 1977 were being removed from service as obsolete, worn-out technology. To fill the gap, 35 new wagons to the J-hopper style were built in 1977/78. The variations from the standard JQX series quarry hoppers were minor; these wagons had "hungry boards" added to increase their volume capacity, as briquettes are not as dense as rocks and therefore more can be held by a given wagon.

The new wagons held numbers 1 to 35, and ran from Morwell to a briquette discharge siding in Footscray, and to the Nestlé factory in Dennington.

In the 1979, recoding the wagons were classed VHBY. In 1982, two wagons were removed from briquette traffic and altered to the VHQY class for quarry trains; wagons JBF 32 and 33 became VHQY 421 and 422, with the hungry boards deleted. By mistake, JBF 30 was stencilled VHQY 30 for a couple of days until corrected – although the wagon was later legitimately recoded to VHQY, taking the number 424. Around the same time, JBF wagons 34 and 1 became VHQY 423 and 425, expanding that class's number series from 420 to 425.

By 1986, all but five of the class had been withdrawn from briquette traffic, as they had been supplanted by the VHEY class. Five were converted to VHQY for quarry traffic, and the rest to VHMF for ballast trains.

=== JCF/X & VHCX/Y (cement powder) ===
These wagons, designed for cement traffic, were released to traffic in 1974 as the JCX class, numbers 101 to 115. The first built, JCX 101, had scalloped ends similar to the design used for the 1966 grain series; all others in the class had flat sheets for the ends.

To reduce the number of wagons available for bogie exchange (as wagons had a habit of disappearing interstate and only reappearing when due for maintenance), from 1977 the class was recoded to JCF. Also at this time, a further 15 wagons, 116 to 130, were being assembled in Ballarat Workshops. Released as JCX, they were immediately taken to Newport for reclassification.

The change to JCF proved to be only temporary, as by 1978 the first fifteen had been converted back to JCX, probably to allow for interstate cement traffic such as the construction of Canberra's new Parliament House.

The JCX class was recoded to VHCX 101–115 in the 1979 recoding, while JCF 116–130 became VHCY. By 1980, these wagons had also become VHCX, for a total class of 101 to 130. In 1986/87, the class was further expanded with the addition of wagons 131 to 135, converted from VHSY sand hoppers 301, 303, 319, 328 and 335.

While in Victoria, the class was primarily used for cement powder transport from Fyansford, near Geelong

=== JDF/X & VHDX/Y (dolomite), VHJX (gypsum) ===
For dolomite traffic between Tantanoola, South Australia and the glass factory at Dandenong, Victoria, ten covered hopper wagons were built in 1974. Coded JDX and given numbers 201 to 210, they were of a gravity discharge design, with top fill. In 1977 the class was relettered to JDF, then in 1979 to VHDY. A further change took place in 1987, giving the class VHDX and, after nearly fifteen years, restoring the wagons to bogie-exchange services.

In late 1989, wagons 201, 202 and 208 had their lids cut off, and they were modified to VHQF, though they kept their numbers. Slope sheets were added to the ends of the wagons to prevent damage to brake equipment with loading overspill. The other wagons in the class, 203–207, 209 and 210, were modified in a similar way but without the slope sheets, around 2000, and given the class VHJX for gypsum traffic. This conversion was done for traffic between Nowingi, Gherinhap and Waurn Ponds. During this conversion, the wagons were painted into Freight Australia colours. Following the cessation of the Nowingi traffic in late 2004 the wagons have been seen in use on the quarry train between Kilmore East and Westall.

=== JPF & VHFF/X/Y (fertiliser) ===
These wagons were built in 1978 to transport superphosphate between the main superphosphate supplier in Geelong and its own distribution centre in Wodonga.

The wagons were coded JPF and numbered 601 – 610. In the 1979 recoding they became VHFY; at the time the combination PY was used to indicate passenger train use, so a swap was effected from the code P for phosphate, to F for fertiliser.

In 1988/1989, wagons 603, 604 and 606 – 610 were noted as reclassed from VHFY to VHFF. It is likely that the other wagons were similarly converted.

In 1991, wagons VHFX 20–23 were converted over from the VHAF class, and in 1993/94 the rest of the VHAF class was converted over to VHFF, becoming numbers 611–616. In 1994, wagons 20–23 were reclassed to VHFF.

In 1990/1991, thirteen VHCX were modified to VHFX. The VHCX numbers (104, 116, 117, 119–124, 127, 128, 133 and 135) were retained.

Wagons were stored at North Geelong from around 2000, and scrapping started in mid-2013.

=== JQF, VHQF/Y (quarry) ===
From 1974, ten wagons coded JQF were built for quarry traffic. These were by far the simplest of the J series hoppers, with no roof and a very basic discharge system. The wagons were numbered 401 to 410, and a second batch added numbers 411–420. Five briquette wagons were also modified to give wagons 421–425.

In 1994, the class doubled in size, with wagons from the VHCX, VHDX and VHRX classes being converted to VHQF numbers 201–225, for a total of 50. The ex-VHRX wagons took on numbers 211–223, adding 210 to their previous number, while the three ex-VHDX wagons kept their original numbers of 201, 202 and 208, and the ex-VHCX wagons randomly filled numbers 203–207, 209, 210, 224 and 225, despite the duplication with the VHJX group's 203–207, 209 and 210. (VHJX and VHDX were originally the same class).

VHJX wagons have been used on quarry trains since 2004, so it is now possible to have a train with two visually identical wagons sharing a number, with the only difference being two letters in the class.

Pacific National lost the contract for the APEX rock trains (Kilmore East mines to Westall and Brooklyn) in mid 2015, with the last run to Westall on 24 December with G536 and 21 wagons. The wagons were transferred to Tottenham Yard awaiting further instructions. QUBE now runs the service, using eleven PHAY wagons in the range 1018 to 1220.

=== VHRX (rutile) ===
Between 1988 and 1990, thirteen wagons were modified and renumbered to VHRX 1–13 for rock/quarry traffic (ten ex-cement traffic, three ex-sand traffic). In 1994 these wagons were cut down to the VHQF design, becoming numbers 201–210, 224 and 225.

These VHRX wagons shared their code with the later VHRX rice hoppers.

=== JSF/X & VHSF/Y (sand) ===
For sand traffic, used in the manufacture of glass products, twenty wagons were issued to traffic in 1974. The class was JSX and the numbers were 301 – 320.

From late 1977, the VR chose to reletter a large number of bogie-exchangeable vehicles to remove that facility; JSX then became JSF. Around this time wagons 321–325 were delivered from Ballarat Workshops. The wagons arrived at Newport Workshops as JSX, but were repainted and released to traffic as JSFs. Some official records indicate that they were supposed to have been released as JSX and renumbered later.

During 1978/1979 a further fifteen wagons were built, bringing the class total to 40. In the 1979 recoding (which took until 1983 to complete), the class became VHSY.

The wagons were organised into sets of seven or eight per train, with trains running six days per week from the ACI Resources Lang Lang sand mine to the Pilkington ACI plant at Dandenong, and to the Australian Glass Manufacturers siding at Spotswood, with spare wagons held if needed.

In the mid-1980s, five wagons (301, 303, 319, 328 and 335) were modified and recoded to VHCX for cement powder transport; a few years later the remaining 35 wagons were recoded to VHSF.

== 2000 ex-NSW rice hoppers ==
During late 2000, Freight Australia purchased a fleet of fifty ex-NSW NGMF hopper wagons from a scrap metal dealer in New South Wales. The wagons were refurbished, repainted to green with "FREIGHT AUSTRALIA" logos on the sides and had broad gauge bogies fitted at the Bendigo North Workshops, and were reclassed VHBF 1101–1150. They started running in January 2001 on rice trains between Deniliquin and Echuca. VHBF 1120 retained its number plate from its original identity, 29218. By 2005, at least one was fitted with a "Pacific National" decal on either side, over the top of the green paintjob.

== Narrow Gauge Wagons ==
Traffic that would ordinarily be placed in hopper wagons was usually loaded into ^{N}QR type wagons on the narrow gauge, including ballast and coal. However, in the preservation era Puffing Billy acquired a pair of ex-Tasmanian hopper wagons for use on ballast trains, and reclassed them as ^{N}N^{N}. Details are covered on the appropriate page.
