= Bowden's Bus Service =

Australian bus company

- Parent: Joe Bowden
- Commenced operation: 22 March 1948
- Ceased operation: 5 June 1974
- Headquarters: Waverley
- Service area: Eastern Suburbs, Sydney
- Service type: Bus services
- Routes: 1
- Depots: 1
- Fleet: 11 (June 1974)

Bowden's Bus Service was an Australian bus company operating route bus services in Sydney's Eastern Suburbs.

== History ==
Route 79 commenced operating on 22 March 1948 from Tamarama Beach via Bronte Beach, Oxford Street, Moore Park Road, Crown, Oxford, College and Macquarie Streets to Macquarie Place, Circular Quay. It was operated as a taxi bus service by two owner/drivers, Joe Bowden and Roy Berglund. In 1950, it was rerouted via Liverpool, Elizabeth, Park and George Streets to terminate in Bathurst Street outside the Sydney Town Hall.

On 26 February 1950, Bowden's commenced operating route 244 Waverley to Bondi Junction under contract to the Department of Government Transport (DGT) after the previous operator ceased trading. It was taken over by the DGT on 21 February 1952. In September 1953, Bowden's assumed full control of route 79.

With declining patronage and pick up restrictions in areas already served by Public Transport Commission, the service became unprofitable and services ceased on 5 June 1974. The Public Transport Commission's Waverley depot took over the route the following day, later renumbering it 376.

== Fleet ==
When operations ceased in June 1974, Bowden's operated 11 buses.
