= Philip Shirley =

Australian businessman

- Shirley in December 1972

Personal details
- Born: Philip Hammond Shirley; 4 October 1912 North Sydney, Australia
- Died: 12 May 1998 (aged 85) St Leonards, England
- Occupation: Executive; Public servant

Philip Hammond Shirley (1912–1998) was an Australian businessman, who held senior positions with the British Transport Commission, British Rail Board and Cunard in the United Kingdom and the Public Transport Commission in Australia.

== Life and career ==
Philip Shirley was born in Australia on 4 October 1912 in North Sydney, before emigrating to England in 1936. In 1958 he became the chairman of Batchelors.

After being appointed to the British Transport Commission in 1961, he became the vice-chairman of the British Rail Board under Richard Beeching in 1964. He was appointed chairman of Cunard in 1968.

Having retired, in 1972 Shirley returned to Australia, having been appointed the inaugural chairman of the Public Transport Commission, becoming the highest paid public servant in New South Wales. Appointed for a five-year term, Shirley resigned in November 1975 and returned to England. Shirley earned the ire of railfans enforcing bans on steam locomotives operating on the main line in both the United Kingdom and Australia.

In the case of the latter, he ordered the scrapping of C38 Class Locomotive 3813 After having been over hauled by the NSW Rail Transport Museum. However, while the parts were removed from the aria they were never scrapped, but were all reunited over time at the Dorrigo Steam Railway and Museum.

Shirley died on 12 May 1998 at 85 years old. He was cremated.
