= Australian standard pallet =

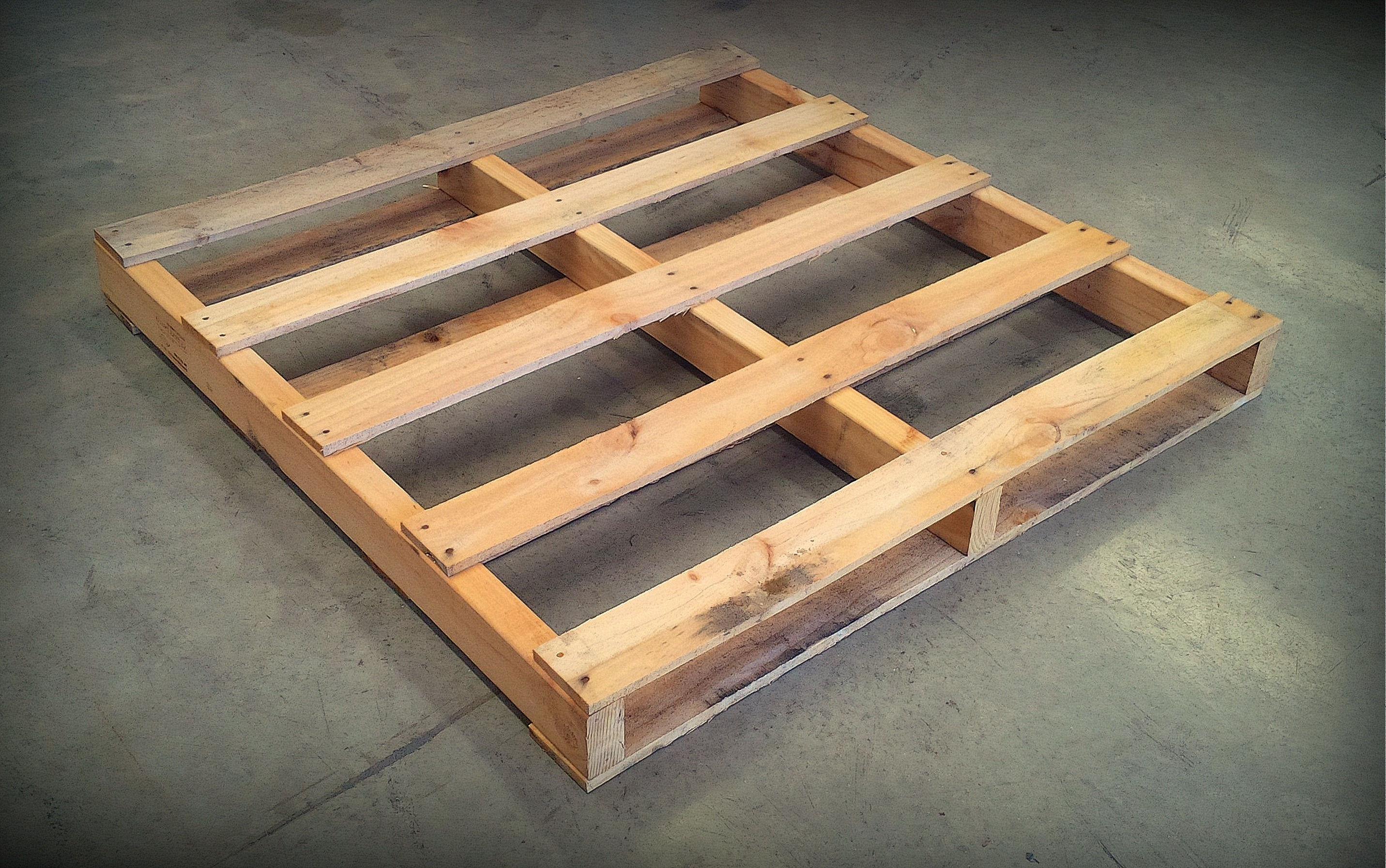
An Australian Standard Pallet made from pine.

Australian standard pallets are square softwood or hardwood pallets that are standard in Australia and non-standard anywhere else in the world.

They are 1165 × 1165 mm in size and fit exactly in the RACE container of the Australian railways. They are ill-suited for the standard 20 feet (6.1 m) and 40 feet (12 m) ISO shipping containers used around the globe.

== Construction and specification ==
Australian standard pallets are defined by Australian Standard AS:4068-1993 Flat pallets for materials handling. They can be manufactured in hardwood or softwood, where hardwood is good for durability, weather tolerance and very heavy loads of over 2 tonne. 1165 × 1165 mm softwood pallets can also be manufactured using lighter timber suitable for use as a lightweight pallet using 19mm boards (up to 1 tonne) or 25mm boards (up to 2 tonne). Australian standard pallets are extensively used in Australian storage and warehousing as racking pallets because they can be removed from transport directly onto warehouse racking for storage.

The majority of Australian business will use a softwood pallet. Pricing ranges from $15.00 AU to $19.00 AU (2019) for a softwood standard size pallet, based on quantities.

== Use ==
The Australian standard pallet is designed for use with the RACE container of Australian railways. Originally the pallet was specified at 46 × 46 inches (from a nominal size of 48 × 48 inches, or 4 ft × 4 ft), but this has been metricated to the marginally smaller 1165 × 1165 mm dimensions. Two pallets will fit closely side by side in a RACE container. They can be stacked on two levels and one container can thus hold 20 pallets. A standard railway wagon carries three containers and can thus hold 60 pallets.

Two-thirds of palletized transport within Australia uses the 1165 × 1165 standard pallet. For external use, where goods are to be shipped in ISO containers, an 1100 × 1100 mm pallet is used. This is a pallet size widely used by Japan and Korea, but is also specified in the Australian standard for pallets.

== History ==
Australia was one of the first countries to develop a standard pallet. During World War II the United States, as part of their logistics effort, used palletized transport on a scale never before seen. This especially impressed the Australians who were still mostly handling goods by manual effort. When the war ended, the Americans left behind their materials handling equipment and a very large stock of pallets in Australia. The Australian government formed the Commonwealth Handling Equipment Pool (CHEP) to exploit these assets, and it was CHEP that introduced the Australian standard pallet. The government sold the assets of CHEP in the 1950s, mostly to port authorities, but the trading name of CHEP was taken by Brambles Limited and is now the largest pallet rental business in the world.

During the 1970s, Australia converted to the metric system. Australia pushed ahead with metrication quickly, and did this with less fuss and opposition than occurred in other countries such as the United States or the United Kingdom. In order to proceed rapidly, a quick decision was needed on pallet sizes before decisions on metrication of packaging could be made. Because of this, it was decided to retain the Australian standard pallet, despite it being peculiar to Australia.

== International standardisation ==
Not using an international standard pallet can increase transport costs of international trade. Export goods may have to be repalletized to suit the requirements of the destination country. In some cases they must be repalletized twice in the distribution chain, once on to a pallet suitable for international containers and again at the destination country if they are also not using a standard pallet. Likewise, import goods will not arrive on an Australian standard pallet and need repalletizing for RACE containers. The intrinsic advantage of palletized transport is that it minimises manual handling operations. These repalletizations detract from that advantage.

A 2002 report commissioned by the Australian Department of Transport and Regional Services examined the possibility of replacing the Australian standard pallet with the ISO standard size of 1200×1000 mm. Two-thirds of Australia's trade is with countries that use either this size, or the near equivalent US standard size of 48×40 inches so changing to this standard would be less costly than to other standard pallet sizes. The report concluded that making this change would be worth a net present value of $2.5 billion at a discount rate of 30%, or $5.1 billion at discount rate of 20%.

Despite the analysis in the report, Australia continues to use the Australian standard pallet. The cost of making the change is estimated at $600 million over ten years, which includes not only the change to the pallets themselves, but also to storage racking and other equipment. Operating costs are estimated to increase by $100 million over the same ten years: the smaller pallet means more handling operations for the same amount of goods, and a less efficient usage of truck and warehouse space (larger pallets have a greater ratio of goods to pallet and packaging).

== Bibliography ==
- Acton, A. P., "Packaging and Packaged Goods", Metrication, the Australian Experience: Proceedings of the North American-Australian Metric Conference, pp. 127–140, Sydney, Canberra and Melbourne, April 1975.
- Review of Domestic and International Pallet Standards and Ongoing Operational and Cost Implications to Australian and International Logistics: Final Report, Strategic design + Development, 21 March 2002.
- Ackerman, Kenneth B., Practical Handbook of Warehousing, Springer, 1997 ISBN 0412125110.
- Leblanc, Rick, "Another sneak attack, war heralded pallet in industry", Pallet Enterprise, May 2002.
- Raballand, Gaël; Aldaz-Carroll, Enrique, How Do Differing Standards Increase Trade Costs? The case of pallets, World Bank Policy Research Working Paper 3519, February 2005.
  - Another version of this paper published in The World Economy, vol. 30, iss. 4, pp. 605–702, April 2007.
