= Railways of Australia =

- Founded: November 1963
- Founder: Commonwealth Railways; New South Wales Government Railways; New Zealand Railways Department; Queensland Railways; South Australian Railways; Tasmanian Government Railways; Victorian Railways; Western Australian Government Railways
- Headquarters: Melbourne

Railways of Australia (ROA) was an association of railways operators. It was established in November 1963 when the government railway operators of Australia and New Zealand decided to unite to promote the industry on a national scale.

The inaugural members were the Commonwealth Railways, New South Wales Government Railways, New Zealand Railways Department, Queensland Railways, South Australian Railways, Tasmanian Government Railways, Victorian Railways and Western Australian Government Railways. Headquartered in Melbourne, it also maintained a sales office in London, England.

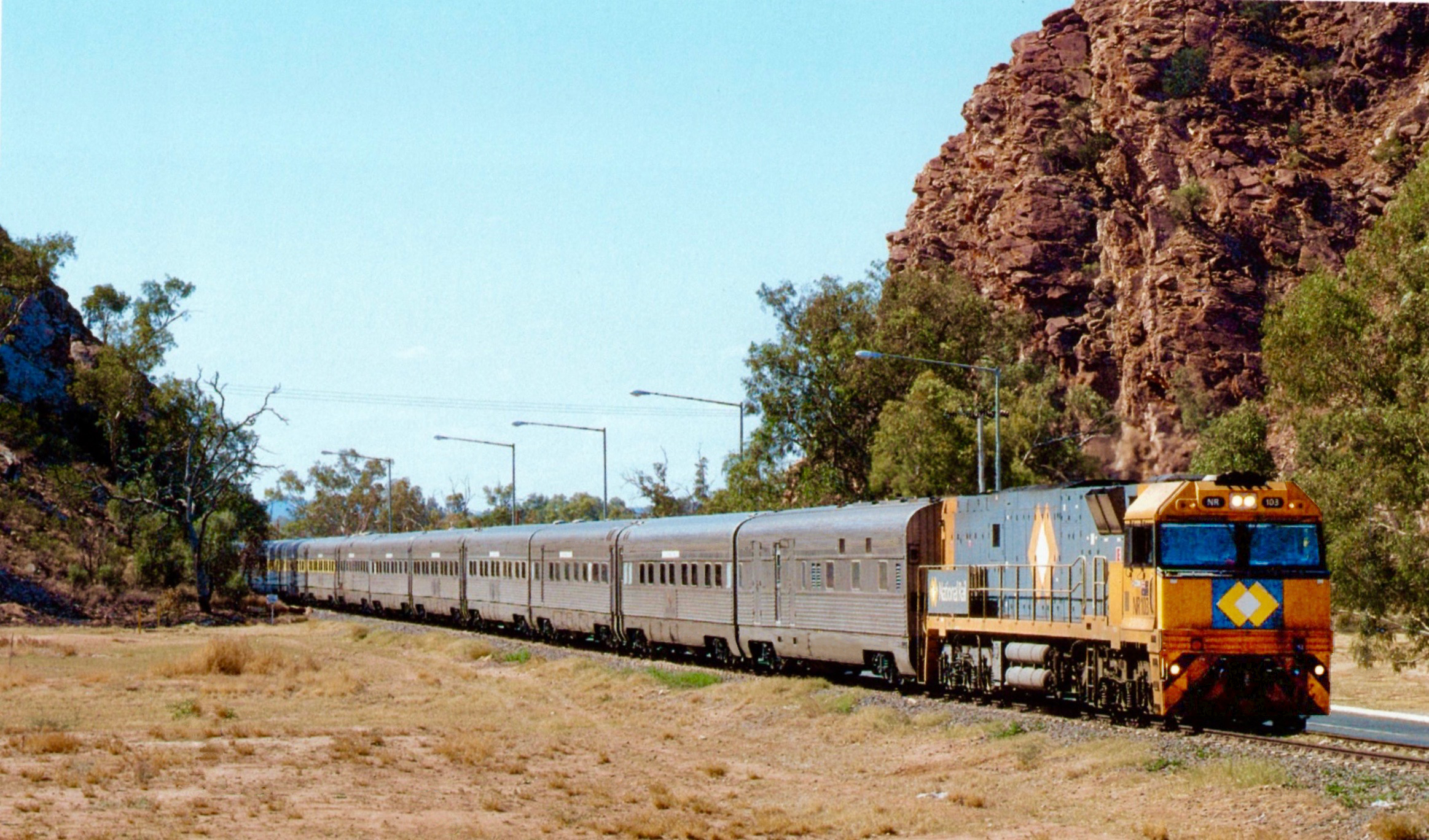
The Ghan train with carriages branded Railways of Australia travelling through Heavitree Gap near Alice Springs

The Indian Pacific passenger train that was jointly operated by four operators, launched in 1970, carried Railways of Australia branding on its carriages.

When most of the government train operators were privatised in the 1990s, Railways of Australia was superseded by the Australasian Railway Association, which as of 2021 comprised 150 member organisations, including listed and private rail-related companies, government agencies and franchisees, passenger and freight operators, track owners and managers, suppliers, manufacturers, contractors and consultants.

== Periodical ==
Beginning in 1964, the ROA published Network, initially published monthly; in the 1980s it became quarterly. In 1997 it was renamed Network Rail, becoming a bi-monthly publication. Publication ended in 1999.

== National freight fleet recoding ==
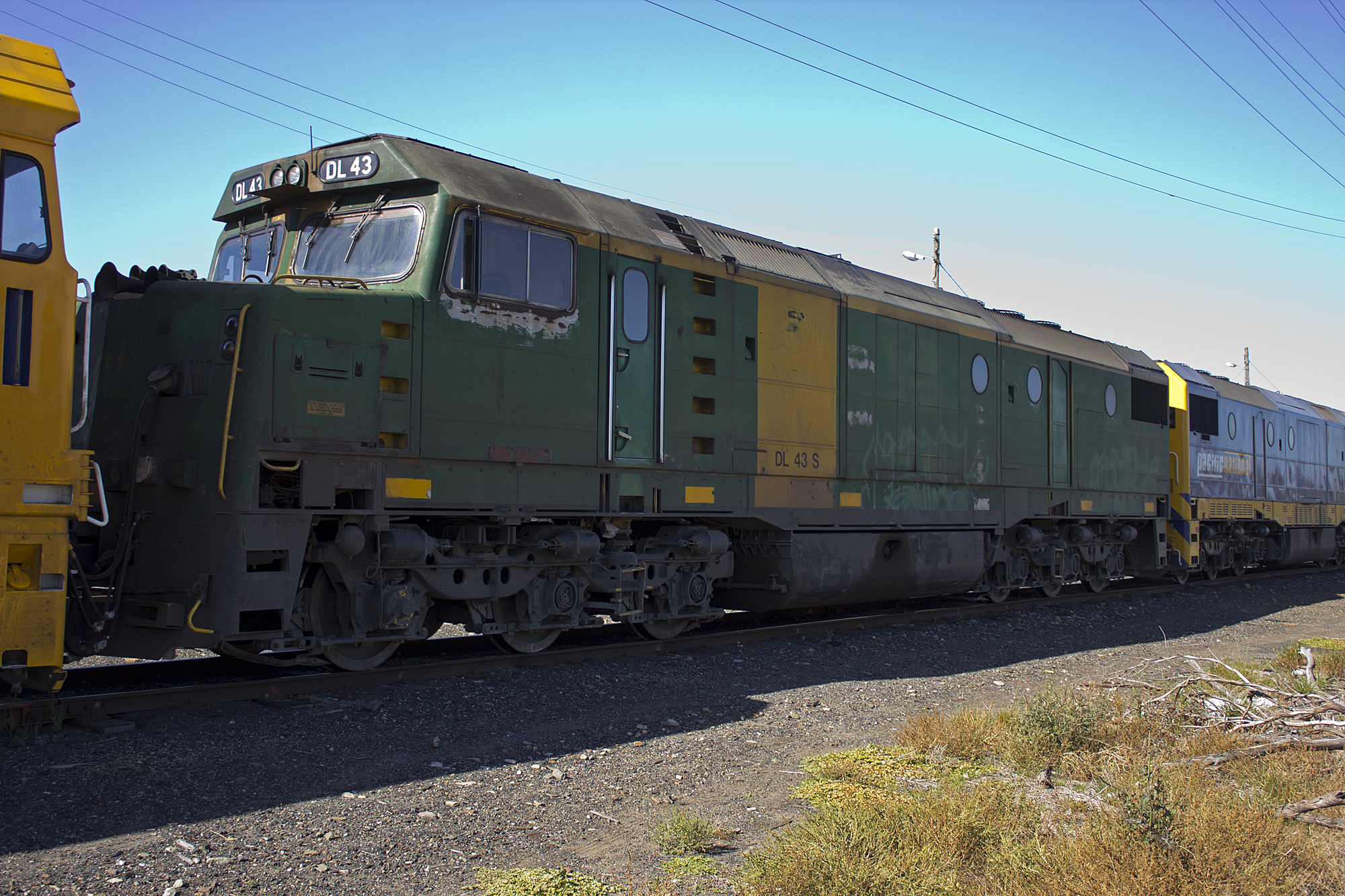
Former Australian National DL class 43 with check letter S

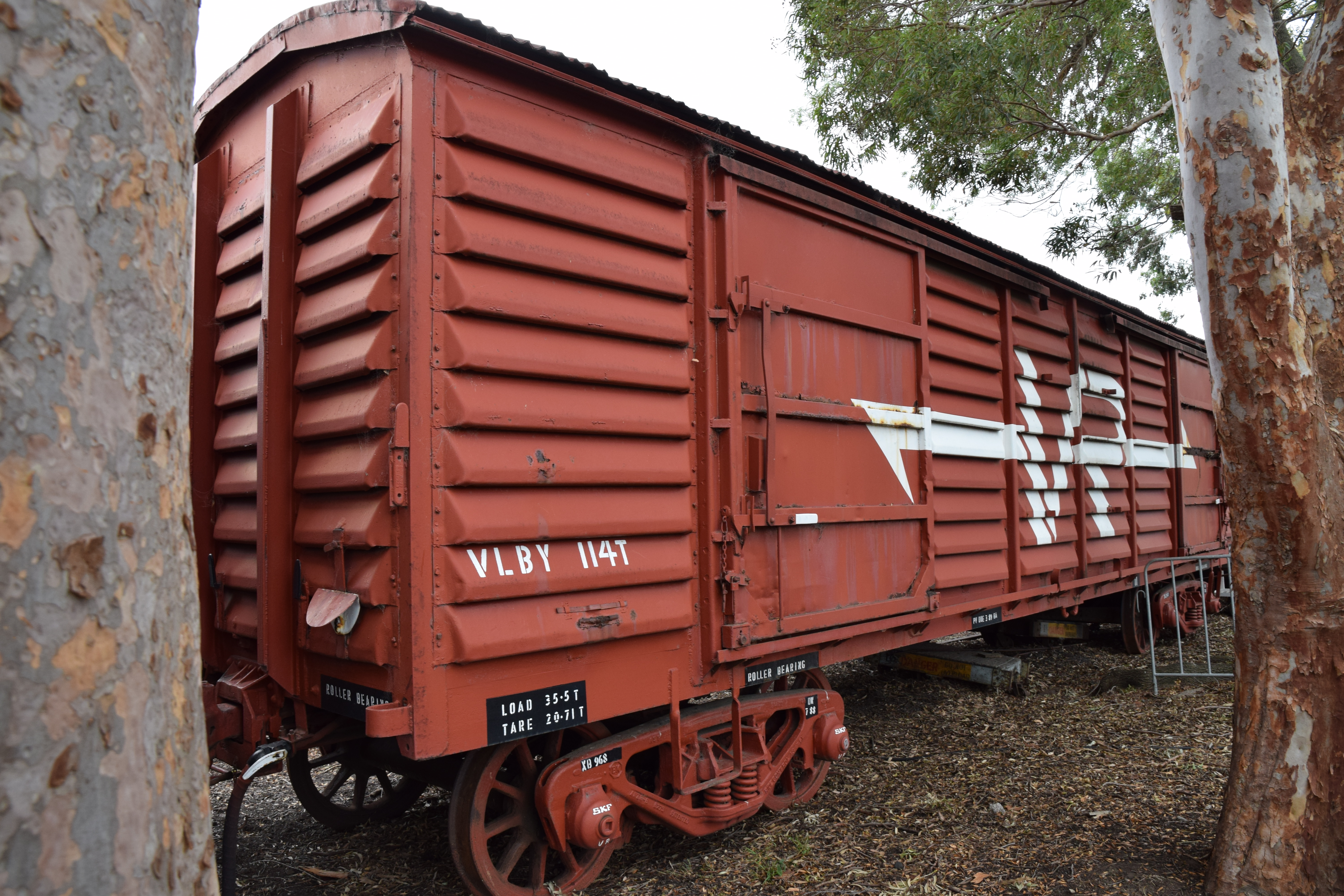
Former Victorian Railways louvre van VLBY114T preserved at the Newport Railway Museum, showing the four-letter code and the check letter applied after the number.

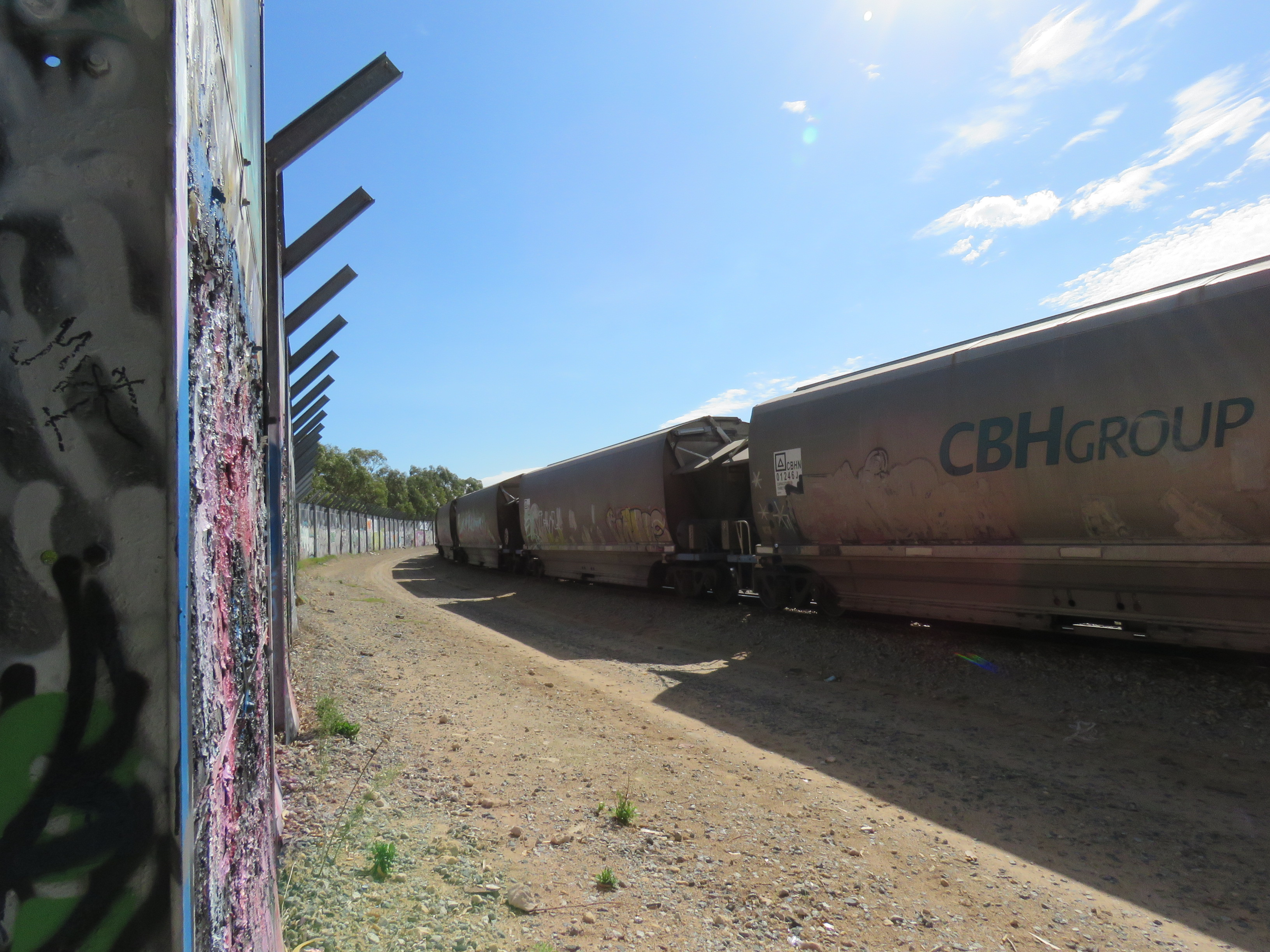
Grain wagon CBHN 01246 (note inserted zero) with check letter J.

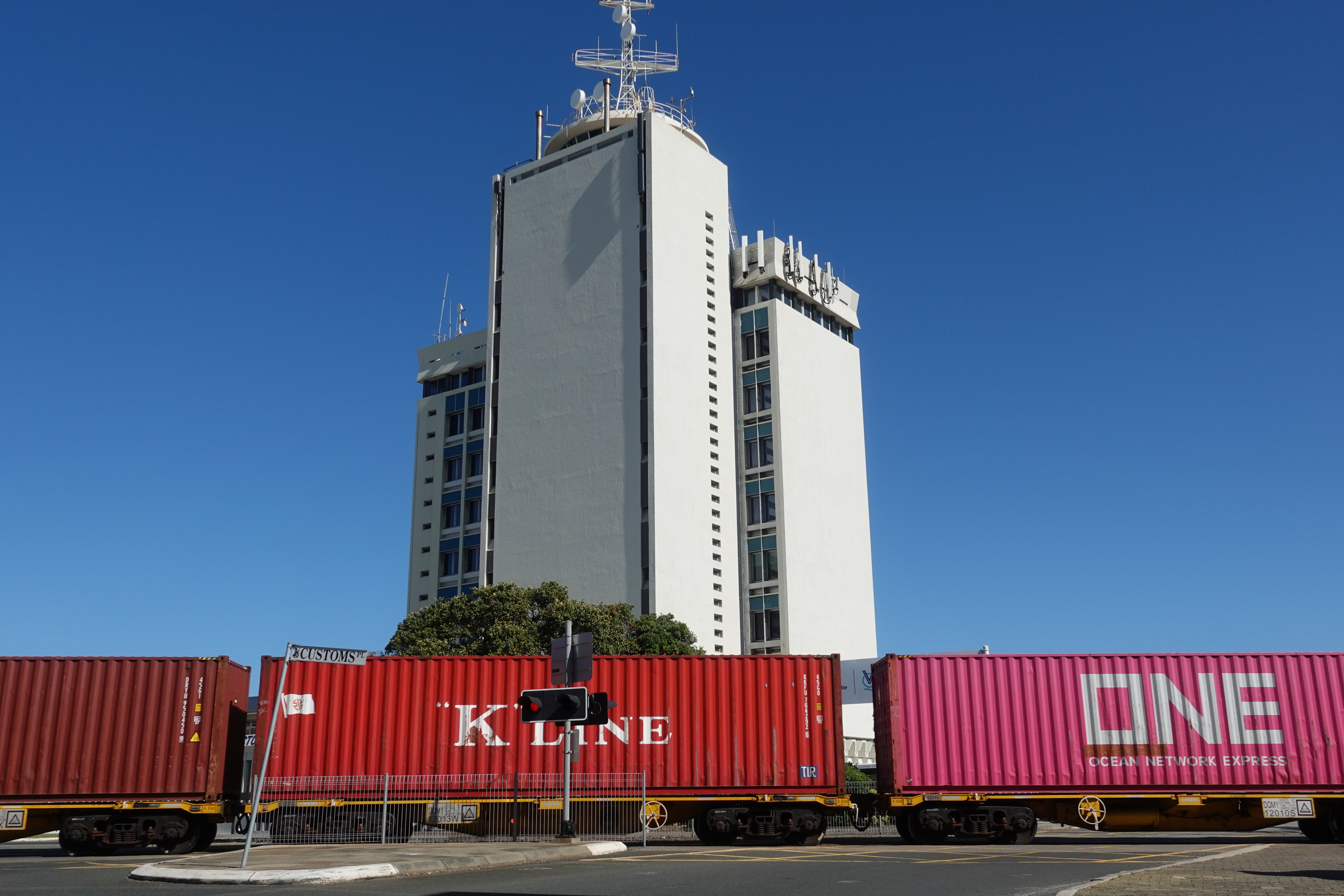
Container flat wagons DQMY 12013 W (red container) and 12010 S (pink container).

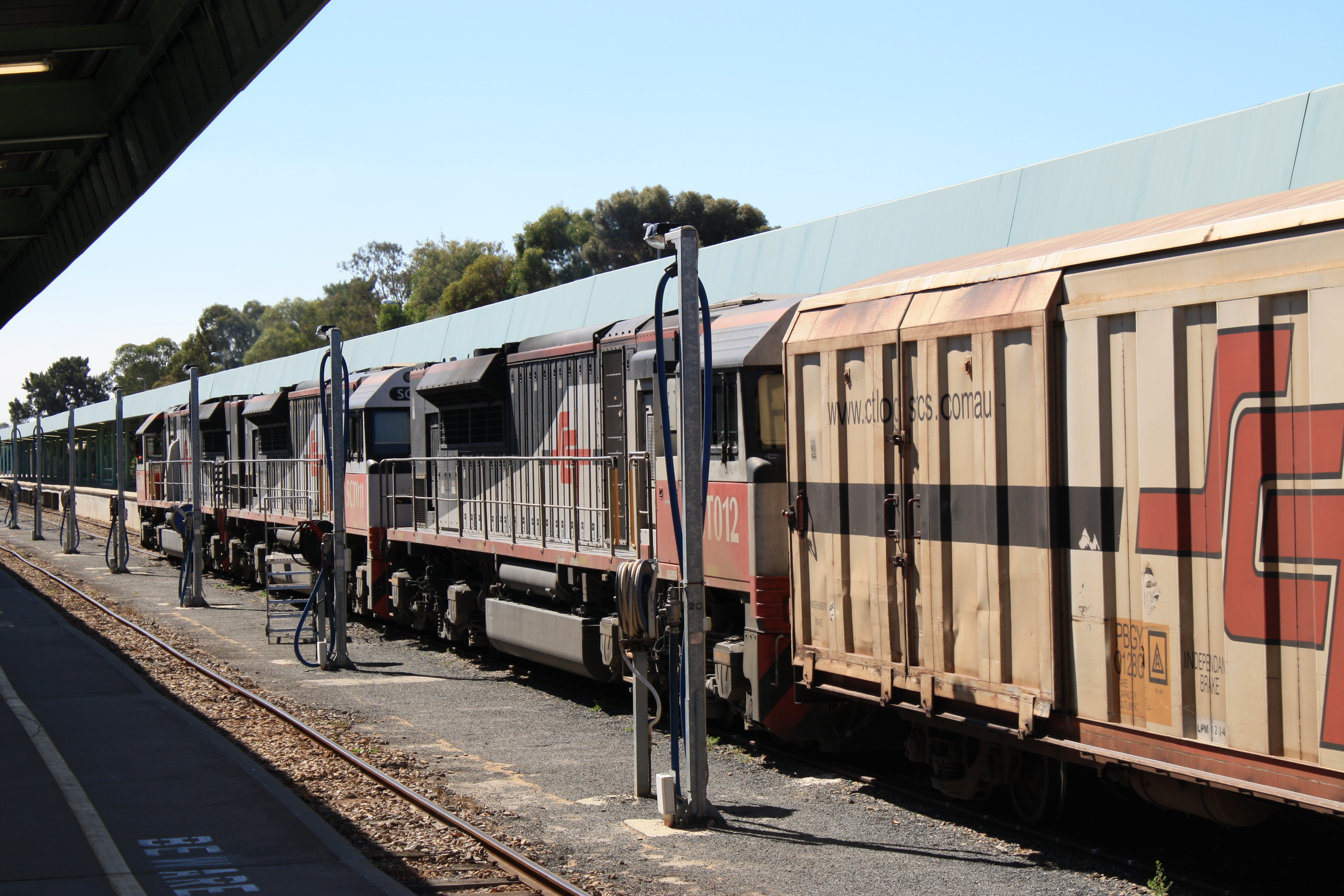
SCT logistics train with leading wagon PBGY 0128 G; note the four-digit number which implies a second zero in the middle.

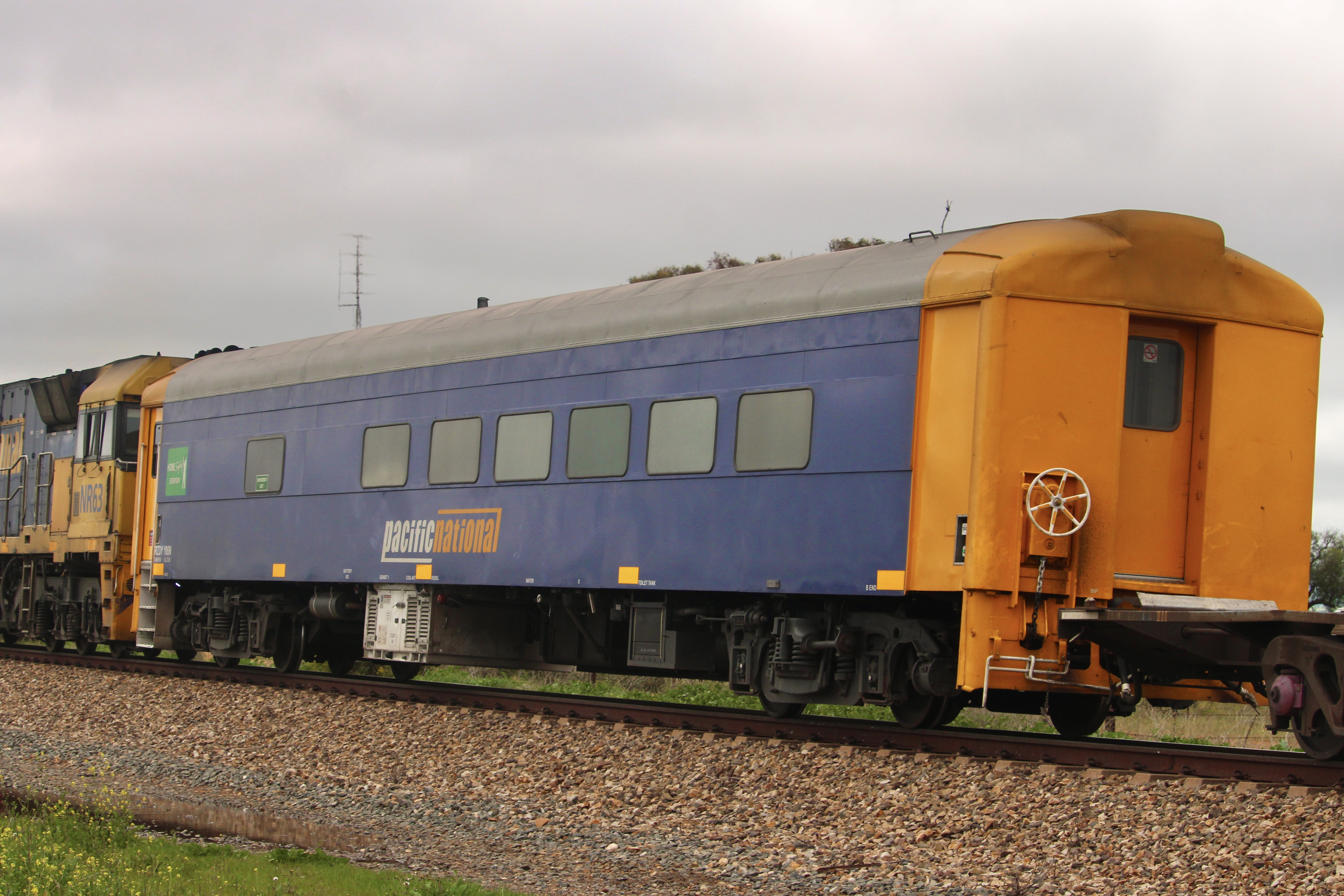
Crew car RZDY 106 N

From late 1978 the railway operators around Australia - Australian National Railways (the combined South Australian Railways, Commonwealth Railways and Tasmanian Government Railways), New South Wales' Public Transport Corporation, Queensland Rail, Victorian Railways and Western Australian Government Railways - began a project to recode all bogie goods rolling stock to a uniform system that would help to keep track of train composition and capabilities. The recoding was not applied to New Zealand railways.

In general, only bogie wagons were to be recoded, and some classes were skipped if they were expected to operate only within state boundaries. The application of the new codes was made over roughly a five-year period starting in 1979. Later changes introduced codes for guard's vans, track maintenance vehicles and a handful of other types, and a check letter system was introduced in 1984-1985 to assist with computerisation. The check letters could also apply to locomotives and passenger rolling stock, though application was patchy and depended on the operator. Later expansion accommodated private rail operators.

Original concepts for the scheme go back to at least 1970, with references to a "national code" being made in wagon design documentation from that time. In the mid to late 1970s some wagons entered service with codes that did not fit their operator's prior patterns, but which could have easily been absorbed into the new national scheme. For example, the Victorian Railways' QMX flat wagons could have become VQMX (though in practice they ended up as VQFX).

Swapping out only the first letter may, or may not, indicate an identical vehicle owned by one of the other systems. For example, the South Australian AOBX and Victorian VOBX open wagons were coincidentally the same general design; both are slightly different from the New South Wales' NOBX.

The first Victorian Railways wagons to enter service with the new codes were timber wagons VFTY, paper roll wagons VFNX, and open wagons VOCX.

Examples of codes that were expected to be used by the Victorian Railways, as of September 1979, are listed below. Note that not all these codes ended up being used, and many others have been introduced since.

Old class	New class	Type	Notes
MBK	JMCY	Automobile wagons	J prefix did not end up being used.
BMX	VBAX	Covered van	
BMF	VBAY	Covered van	
BLX	VBBX	Covered van	
BLF	VBBY	Covered van	
BFW	VBCW	Covered van	
BP	VBPY	Covered van	Source says VBY, missing "P"
Q	VFAA	Flat wagons	
QF	VFBY	Flat wagons	
QAB	VFCA	Flat wagons	Not used a/c QAB2 stored, 1 & 3 scrapped
S	VFDA	Flat wagons	
SX	VFEX	Flat wagons	
SCX	VFFX	Flat wagons	
QH	VFGA	Flat wagons	
QS	VFHA	Flat wagons	Not sighted by Sep’79
SBX	VFJX	Flat wagons	
SKX	VFKX	Flat wagons	
SKF	VFKY	Flat wagons	
SFX	VFLX	Flat wagons	
SFF	VFLY	Flat wagons	
FPX	VFMX	Flat wagons	Not sighted by Sep’79
?	VFNX	Flat wagons	
CSX	VFSX	Flat wagons	
Timber	VFTY	Flat wagons	Not given pre-ROA code
JAF	VHAY	Hopper wagons	
JBF	VHBY	Hopper wagons	
CJ	VHCA	Hopper wagons	
JCX	VHCX	Hopper wagons	
JCF	VHCY	Hopper wagons	
JDF	VHDY	Hopper wagons	
JPF	VHFY	Hopper wagons	
GJX	VHGX	Hopper wagons	Not sighted by Sep’79
GJF	VHGY	Hopper wagons	VHGY64 accidentally coded VHEY64
QN	VHNA	Hopper wagons	
JQF	VHQY	Hopper wagons	
JSF	VHSY	Hopper wagons	
NN	VHWA	Hopper wagons	
UB	VLAA	Louvre van	Not sighted by Sep’79
UF	VLAY	Louvre van	All UF’s scrapped by time of recoding
VF	VLBY	Louvre van	
VLX	VLCX	Louvre van	
VHX	VLDX	Louvre van	
VSX	VLEX	Louvre van	
VSF	VLEY	Louvre van	
UB	VLLA	Louvre van	
VP	VLPY	Louvre van	
AX	VMAX	Automobile wagons	
ALX	VMBY	Automobile wagons	
ALP	VMPY	Automobile wagons	
E	VOAA	Open wagons	
ELX	VOBX	Open wagons	
ELX (ridge)	VOCX	Open wagons	
ESX	VODX	Open wagons	
QR	VOWA	Open wagons	
JX	VPCX	Pneumatic discharge	
FX	VPFX	Pneumatic discharge	
FVF	VQAY	Container wagons	FVF1 and 2 stored at NWS
TVX	VQBX	Container wagons	
TVF	VQBY	Container wagons	
FQX	VQCX	Container wagons	
FQF	VQCY	Container wagons	
FCW	VQDW	Container wagons	
QGF	VQEY	Container wagons	Not sighted by Sep’79
QMX	VQFX	Container wagons	
TP	VRPY	Refrigerator van	Not sighted by Sep’79
LF	VSAY	Livestock wagons	Not sighted by Sep’79
MF	VSBY	Livestock wagons	Source says FP>VSBY
FP	VSPY	Livestock wagons	Not sighted by Sep’79
TW	VTBA	Tank wagons – Bitumen	
TWX	VTBX	Tank wagons – Bitumen	
TWF	VTBY	Tank wagons – Bitumen	
TW	VTGA	Tank wagons – L. P. Gas	Not sighted by Sep’79
TWX	VTGX	Tank wagons – L. P. Gas	
TWF	VTGY	Tank wagons – L. P. Gas	Not sighted by Sep’79
TW	VTHA	Tank wagons – Hazardous	VTHA197 accidentally coded VTQA197
TWX	VTHX	Tank wagons – Hazardous	
TWF	VTHY	Tank wagons – Hazardous	Not sighted by Sep’79
TW	VTOA	Tank wagons – Petroleum	
TWX	VTOX	Tank wagons – Petroleum	Not sighted by Sep’79
TWF	VTOY	Tank wagons – Petroleum	Not sighted by Sep’79
TW	VTQA	Tank wagons – Petroleum	
TWX	VTQX	Tank wagons – Petroleum	Not sighted by Sep’79
TWF	VTQY	Tank wagons – Petroleum	
QB	VWAA	Well wagons	
QW	VWBA	Well wagons	Not sighted by Sep’79
QWF	VWCY	Well wagons	Not sighted by Sep’79

=== Possible early attempts ===
From the late 1960s many South Australian wagons entered service with four-letter codes; for example some of the FBX flat wagons were recoded SFBX in 1970. Most of the classes in that category had an "S" prefix; the list included the SFCW and SFQX container wagons, PFBF, PFBR, SFBX and SFKX flat wagons, SHBX hoppers, SGMX open wagons, SHCX pneumatic discharge hoppers and STAX and STWX tank wagons. Many of these were the then-normal South Australian codes (some of which were shared by Victoria).

Vincent suggested that the use of the "S" prefix on some South Australian Railways rolling stock could have been an early attempt to conform to the national code, with the "S" indicating South Australian ownership. This could be supported by correspondence or documentation establishing the derivation of the "P" prefix on the PFBF and PFBR wagons being applied to privately-owned wagons. Alternatively, the "S" prefix as applied in the late 60s and early 70s could have been a flag for standard gauge rolling stock, using an idea cribbed from the Commonwealth Railways' use of the "N" prefix to flag narrow gauge rolling stock which was otherwise identical to its standard gauge counterparts. It is known that the SHBX grain hoppers in particular were specifically being designed for use on the new standard gauge line linking Broken Hill with Port Pirie, linking to the Trans-Australian Railway. Vincent also notes some correspondence from within the Victorian Railways, dated 1970 and relating to rolling stock then planned for construction, which suggested four-letter codes in line with a "National Coding" system.

=== Guards vans and check letters ===
==== Codes for guard's vans ====
New South Wales guards vans had been allocated new codes with the NVxx prefix as early as 1980, with ten different classes allocated. These were, respectively, EHG, FHG, GHG, IHG, JHG, KHG, MHG, PHG, SHG and UHG, to NVEF, NVFF, NVGA, NVIF, NVJA, NVKF, NVMF, NVPA, NVSA and NVUF. Generally speaking, the "HG" suffix was replaced by an "NV" prefix, and a fourth letter added to denote the bogie type and speed restrictions. New codes were not generated for vans affiliated with passenger trains, like the LHO and MHO vans for intrastate and Victorian trains, or the MHN and PHN vans for the Southern Aurora and the HG and HGM vans of the Indian Pacific.

From late 1982 South Australian, and later Victorian, guards vans were incorporated into the ROA coding structure. In South Australia the majority of the guards vans were of the 8300 class, and these became the AVAY class (later AVAP, with recodings to ABLP and AZXP for other uses). Other changes were HRD to AVDY and HRE to AVEY, as with New South Wales retaining the unique letter from the old code and surrounding it with new context.

In Victoria, the guard's vans previously coded CA, ZLP, CP, ZF and ZMF became VVAP, VVBP, VVCP, VVDY and VVEY respectively. In this case the new unique third letters were simply in order of class introduction, ignoring the short-lived and unique ZZ van. As with New South Wales, van classes that were generally used on passenger trains - the C, CE, CW, CV and joint stock classes - were not recoded. Furthermore, many of those vans were being withdrawn around the same time as the recoding was taking place; the final nineteen C vans were all struck from the register on 3 March 1983. Later, a handful of VVCP vans reverted to the CP classification as additions to the V/Line fleet in passenger service, and some VVBP vans were recoded MD for use on maintenance trains. However, this was around the same time that two-person train operation, without guards, was being introduced, so not every van received the new code. Of the 15 CA vans, for example, only eight are known to have been recoded. In practice only about two-thirds of the Victorian guard's van fleet was recoded, with nearly the whole fleet withdrawn in 1985.

==== Introduction of check letters ====
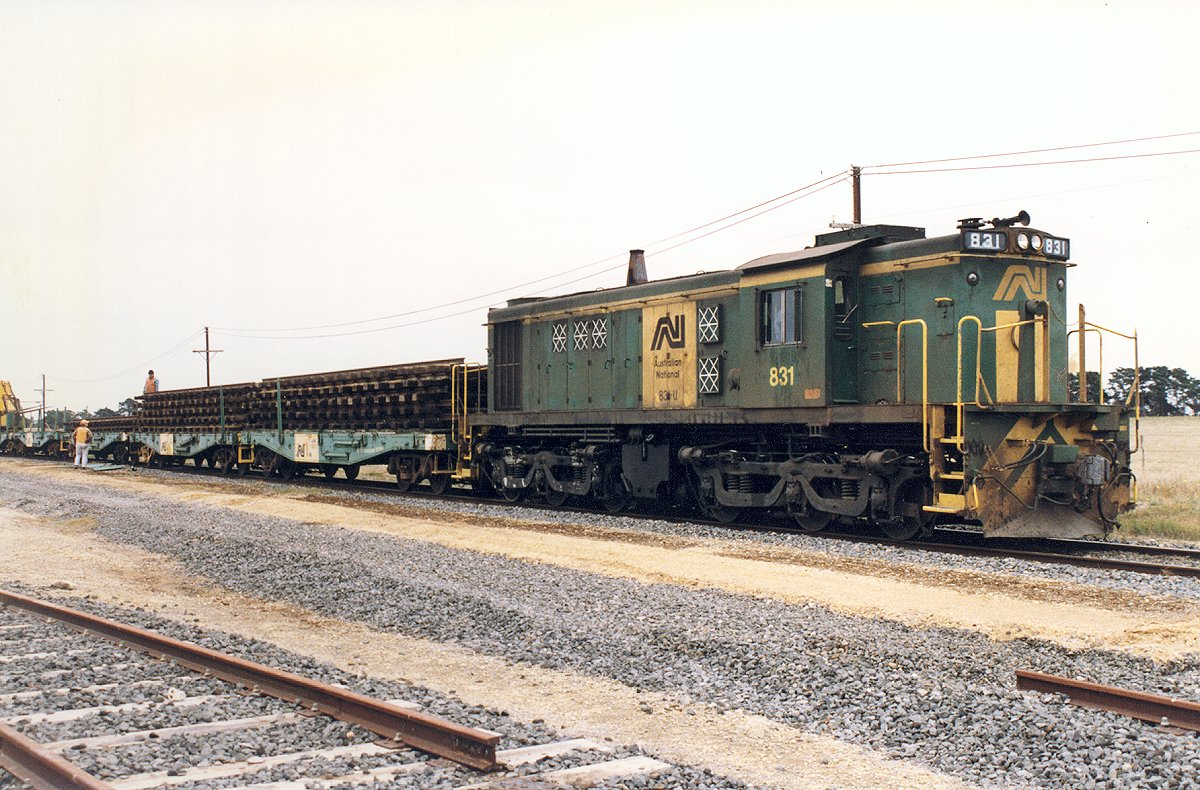
830 class number 831 with check letter U; this means the long-form code was written as 00831 with an empty class, rather than either 830000831 (L) or LOCO00831 (Q).

In the mid 1980s Australian National introduced a new, computerised Train Monitoring System (TMS) as a database to keep track of the complete rolling stock fleet, including characteristics like utilisation, reliability and maintenance requirements. The system was developed through the 1984/85 financial year and implemented from April 1985. A subset of the system was the Wagon Monitoring System (WMS), which was implemented on the standard gauge system between October 1984 and December 1985, and later in the Eyre Peninsula and Tasmania. The WMS required a system of check letters appended to the end of vehicle codes, to catch and avoid errors that would have interfered with the database's reliable operation. The check letter system was designed to detect errors in either the wagon code, number or check letter, by testing for mismatches, and prompt the user to correct the information before submitting it to the database.

As of 23 August 1983, by circular A.156/83, V/Line began to apply check letters to their goods rolling stock following the same pattern that Australian National had been using for "several years" prior, though where AN had used it on all types of goods stock, V/Line specified only bogie goods stock. This was used in the Victorian parallel to AN's TMS, the VELAS system. The instruction specified that a gap was to be left between the wagon number and check letter, "where possible". The check letters were generally painted to a height of 105 mm (4.1 in), though occasionally the prior 7 in (180 mm) font was used. Early sightings of wagons with the check letter applied were VBBX61B, VLCX240N, VLCX393S, VLCX481W, VLCX584K and VOCY1131A, at Benalla on 14 August 1983. Examples from a month later at the same location included G5693R, (Note: G5693R was the first Victorian fixed-axle vehicle sighted with a check letter.) VFNX41H, VLCX354S, VLCX406D, VLCX625B, (Note: VLCX625B was misreported in the Newsrail issue as "VLBCX", but the check letter "B" confirms the class.) VLEX815N, VOBX61E, VOCX250E, VOBX399G, VOCX413N, VOCX2029W, VPCX2Q, KMQ186G, (Note: KMQ186G was misreported in the Newsrail issue as "KMQ1869", but the code KMQ and number 186 confirms the letter "G".) VLEX997K and VTQA255J. (Note: VTQA255J was misreported in the Newsrail issue as "VTAQ2555J", but the check letter "J" combined with the code needing to end in a bogie-letter (A, W, X or Y) confirms the class and number.) Several South Australia AVAY guards vans were also sighted with check letters around this time. Victorian guards vans were first noted with check letters in 1986, including VVAP4X, VVBP9K, VVBP41Q, VVBP52K, VVBP58S, VVBP64N, VVDY36D and VVDY38V.

The system implemented converted the nine-character identity of every item of rollingstock by allocating a number in place of each letter (A=1, Z=26), inserting as many zeroes as required between the fourth letter and the first digit, then filling the remaining spaces with the wagon's number. Thus, AOBX502 would become AOBX00502.

A formula was then used, multiplying each of the nine character slots by an increasing integer (1st x1, 2nd x2, 3rd x3 ... 9th slot x9), then dividing the total by 23. The remainder, plus one (1), is then converted back to a letter in the sequence A-Z, but with I replaced by X and O replaced by Y to avoid the appearance of a number in the tenth wagon ID field. This function makes it impossible to have a check letter of "Z", thus avoiding confusion between that and the number "2".

In cases where a locomotive did not have a lettered class identity the official rule was to use the word "LOCO" as the first four characters, but this did not always happen; in practice the first four character spaces were often left blank. For vehicles with a name, the first four letters would be used, and those without an allocated number would be treated as number zero. Comrails gives the example of passenger car Coonatto becoming "COON 0", which would be treated as COON00000. It is not clear how this system was intended to handle named vehicles which shared the first four letters.

By 29 March 1987 Australian National had applied check letters, using the above formula, to their passenger fleet. A consist sighted on that date was CO1T-PCO4R-JTA5G-JRB1P-CLUB2B-JRA5C-JTB4A-JTA3L-AJ3C-BJ6H-RBJ3K-BJ8C. This process included reversing the number-code order, e.g. CO1T had previously been 1CO, and RBJ3K was previously 3RBJ. The sleeping carriages in that set retained their names, but the check letters were derived from the newly introduced JRA/JRB/JTA/JTB carriage classifications.

There were a handful of cases where the check letter was applied in accordance with ROA rules, but before the ROA four-letter code had been applied to the same wagon; for instance an undated photo of a Western Australian tank wagon with code WJP, the check letter reflects a then-future recode to ATPF.

=== Changes to code structure ===
After a decade of relatively stable code applications, by September 1987 the Railways of Australia made two significant code alterations. The first was utilisation of additional second letters to segregate steel traffic from normal wagon types, and the second was a redefinition of freight bogie types.

==== Steel traffic group "C" and "K" ====
Under the updated rules, the new second letters "C" and "K" were introduced to separate out wagons specifically designed for transporting steel products. In Victoria this meant recoding of the VFSX wagons to VCSX and VOSX to VCCX, for coil steel and, for slab steel, the VOEX to VKEX and VFKX to VKKX, among others.

The steel wagon recoding was anticipated as early as mid-1987, when V/Line discussed construction of new "VOSX (to become VCCX) coil steel wagons", and "VOBX to VOEX (to become VKEX) slab steel flats."

==== Introduction of "F" and "P" bogie types ====
The second change made around 1987 applied to the bogie letter; where previously "Y" had been reserved for all non-bogie-exchange wagons, regardless of other constraints, the new letter "F" was added to separate that group into speed tiers. "Y" was retained for wagons that were not bogie-exchangeable, but were "capable of higher than normal express freight speed", e.g. 100 km/h (62 mph) in lieu of the normal 80 km/h (50 mph).

(Vincent hypothesised that the bulk recode of V/Line stock from "Y" to "F" suffix had been due to an "incorrect application" that was not realised until the mid/late 1980s.)

The change did not impact wagons like the New South Wales' NQOY, NLKY and Australian National AFSY, AQSY, AFTY and AFWY, which were all already capable of higher speed operation, but the vast majority of the V/Line, Australian National and Westrail fleets were expected to be recoded. Many of these were changed to "X" with minor equipment adjustments to meet the bogie exchange requirements, including V/Line's VQCY container wagons being recoded to VQCX.

Comrails describes an intentional decision at around the same time from "Y" to "P" as the suffix for the Australian National guard's van fleet, allowing operation at 115 km/h (71 mph), and it seems possible that this change to the code was made at the same time.

Notably, the Victorian Railways guards vans had been split between "P" and "Y" suffixes from introduction around 1983, with the same distinction applied to Motorail wagons VMAP and VMBP to indicate passenger speed; this worked in parallel with other classes where the use of a third letter "P" meant passenger speeds as a subset of a fourth letter "Y" series, as used on the VBPY, VLPY and VSPY wagons, later joined by the VMPY class. In the 1987/88 change all Victorian wagons formerly with a "Y" suffix changed to "X" or "F" and none changed to "P", but this could have been a reflection of the split between the freight and passenger systems. For example, in 1979 the Victorian Railways' BMX/BMF medium-size bogie boxvan fleet was recoded as VBAX/VBAY respectively, then in 1982 a handful were pulled from that group and allocated to passenger service as the new VBPY class. Shortly thereafter the VBPYs became D vans and were painted in the passenger livery at the time. So, without that last change, it is possible but unprovable whether or not the VBPY vans would have become VBAP in 1987, paralleling the South Australian stock.

==== Departmental stock "D" and "Z" ====
Originally exempt from the system, by the early 1980s a handful of wagons had been recoded with a "D" as the second letter. In Victoria the two VDSY (former FVF, later VDSF) wagons were used by shunting crews around goods yards, while in New South Wales the "D" was used for a wide range of vehicles associated with track maintenance. From 1985 the second letter "Z" began to see use in all types of maintenance contexts, including track maintenance (sleepers, ballast, rails) but also things like locomotive sand, bogie frame and wheel transport or storage vans. In Victoria the VZxx series started with bogie transport wagons in 1985, adding ballast wagons in 1987 then the vast majority of the maintenance fleet in the following year. In New South Wales the "D" was retained for the track maintenance group, and "Z" used for special-purpose wagons such as those designed for exceedingly large and heavy loads.

==== Lease and sale prefix changes "R", "N" and "V" ====
When the National Rail Corporation was set up in the early 90s it did not initially have a large enough fleet of its own, so it borrowed extensively from all the state-based freight operators. The wagons leased were recoded with an "R" prefix in lieu of the former state prefix, and other letters were changed if necessary to avoid duplicate classes. The former Australian National fleet changed from an "A" prefix to "R" (for example, AQMY to RQMY). As the NRC fleet grew the wagons were returned to their previous owners and generally reclaimed their prior identities. Later, when Pacific National absorbed National Rail Corporation, Freight Australia and FreightCorp, they did not bother with mass recoding and simply kept the prefixes "N", "R" and "V".

As of 2026 the prefix system appears to have somewhat broken down. In Victoria, the three main operators are Pacific National, Qube Logistics and Southern Shorthaul Railroad. Respectively, they have wagons accredited for use in Victoria with the prefixes A, N, R, V, X and leased C, N, R, W; N, R, S, T, W, V and leased A, B, C, P, T, W, Z; and A, B, C, K, P, R, T and leased A, C, M and N, alongside One Rail Australia and Great Southern Rail each having "A" prefix wagons.

=== Explanation of codes ===
The new system used a four-letter wagon code with up to five digits to identify the individual class member. The first letter was reserved for the owner, initially A, N, Q, V or W respectively with the potential J for joint-stock where ownership was shared between operators. The second letter identified the wagon type, e.g. flat wagons, hoppers, tank cars and so on. The third letter was free for the operator to specify the subtype, though it was generally in sequence by age (e.g. xxAx was the oldest type that operator owned, xxBx the next and so on), or with specific letters for traffic subtypes (e.g. xxCx for Cement, xxDx for Dolomite). In Victoria the third letter of "P" was initially used to flag rolling stock intended for use behind passenger trains at speeds up to 115 km/h (71 mph), though later the letter "P" was permitted in the fourth slot. The fourth letter indicated the operating characteristics of the wagon. A was for low speed wagons, limited to 65 km/h (40 mph). and fixed gauge, W for 80 km/h (50 mph) km/h but with small-diameter wheels where extra clearance permitted taller loads and fixed gauge, X was for bogie-exchangeable rolling stock and Y for non-exchangeable stock. All wagons within the last-letter group could have their bogies exchanged within that group only. Later, X was redefined as bogie exchangeable with 80 km/h (50 mph) maximum speed and "F" introduced as non-exchangeable 80 km/h (50 mph), with "Y" changed to non-exchangeable, 115 km/h (71 mph).

Various collections of letter translations are available online, with the differences between them largely explained by the date of publication. The lists below are an amalgamation of various third-party sources and should not be taken as prescriptive. The current list may be available in Australian Standard AS.7503.2.

==== List of operator prefix letters ====
1st letter	Current	Former
A	Genesee & Wyoming, Australian Railroad Group (ARG)	Australian National Railways Commission (AN), Australian National Railways (ANR)
B	Bluescope Steel	BHP Billiton
C	Chicago Freight Car Leasing Australia (CFCLA)	
D	"Vacant" (Note: The first letter "D" is in use in Western Australia, as shown in the photo at right of DQMY-class wagons)	
E	Junee Railway Workshop	Australian Traction Corporation (Austrac)
F	"Vacant"	FreightLink
G	"Vacant"	Great Northern Rail Services (GN)
H	"Vacant"	
I	"Vacant"	
J	John Holland Group	
K	"Vacant"	
L	Independent Railway of Australia (formerly LVRF)	Lachlan Valley Rail Freight (LVRF)
M	Manildra Group, Mount Gibson Mining	
N	Pacific National	FreightCorp, State Rail Authority of New South Wales (SRA)
O	"Vacant"	
P	Small, private operators (e.g. SCT Logistics, Nova Coal, Patrick Rail etc.)	Patricks
Q	Queensland Rail (QR)	Queensland National
R	Pacific National (PN)	National Rail Corporation (NRC)
S	Silverton Tramway Company	Southern Silverton
T	Toll Transport	TNT / Toll Holdings
U	"Vacant"	
V	V/Line, Pacific National	Victorian Railways (VR)
W	Queensland National - Western Australian sector	Westrail (WAGR)
X	Pacific National (formerly ATN Access)	GrainCorp
Y	"Vacant"	
Z	El Zorro Generating Solutions	El Zorro

==== List of wagon type letters ====
2nd letter	Current	Former
A	Trailerail and Car Carrier	
B	Boxvan or covered van	
C	Coil(ed) steel wagon	
D	Departmental stock (Pacific National only)	Departmental stock; used in New South Wales but superseded by "Z" Superseded in Victoria by "Z".
E	Intermodal container wagons fitted with Head-end power connections to power, for example, refrigerated containers. (Note: Bray & Vincent (2006) say the second letter "E" is for any sort of electrical connection, without specifying standard head-end power.)	
F	Flat wagon, not fitted for container use	
G	Grain hopper	
H	Hopper wagon (gravity discharge), including coal.	
I	Vacant	
J	Vacant	
K	Slab or bulk steel	
L	Louvre van - boxcars, but with louvres built into the sides and ends for ventilation to cope with Australian climate conditions.	
M	Automobile carrier, e.g. Motorail	
N	Vacant	
O	Open wagon or gondola	
P	Pneumatic discharge hopper	
Q	Intermodal container wagon	
R	Refrigerated wagon, (Pacific National only)	Victoria intended to use the code VRPY, but none of the candidate vehicles lasted long enough to be recoded in practice.
S	Livestock wagon	Metro Trains Melbourne says this slot is vacant
T	Tank wagon	
U	Vacant	
V	Guard's or brake van	Metro Trains Melbourne says this slot is vacant
W	Well wagon, may be fitted for container transport	
X	Vacant	
Y	Vacant	
Z	Special purpose wagon; Departmental/non-revenue stock in Victoria	Departmental Traffic (non-revenue stock)

==== List of bogie suffix letters ====
4th letter	Gauge-Exchangeable	Maximum speed	Description	Notes
A	No	65 km/h (40 mph); or less than 70 km/h (43 mph), or slow speeds in general.		Originally restricted to plain-bearing bogies, now any type with these speed characteristics.
B	{Vacant}			
C	No			
D	{Vacant}			
E	{Vacant}			
F	No	80 km/h (50 mph)	Roller-bearing bogies, three-piece structure	
G	{Vacant}			
H	Unspecified	Generally speed-limited.	Heavy axle load wagons (maximum weight over 84 t (83 LT), restricted routes	Genesee & Wyoming and Pacific National only
I	{Vacant}			
J	{Vacant}			
K	{Vacant}			
L	Within Genesee & Wyoming system only.	80 km/h (50 mph)		Not permitted in New South Wales except by special arrangement.
M	{Vacant}			
N	{Vacant}			
O	{Vacant}			
P	No	95 to 115 km/h (59 to 71 mph)	For passenger trains	Superseded by "Y" and "Z"
Q	{Vacant}			
R	{Vacant}			
S	{Vacant}	145 km/h (90 mph)		
T	{Vacant}	160 km/h (99 mph)		
U	{Vacant}			
V	No			
W	No, or Yes within "W" suffix series only.	95 km/h (59 mph)	Roller bearing bogies	Small diameter wheelsets and lowered bogie sideframes,
X	Yes	80 km/h (50 mph)	Roller-bearing bogies	Must be fitted with load control on the brake system
Y	No	115 km/h (71 mph)	Roller-bearing bogies, one-piece casting	Victoria used the paired "PY" final letters for non-exchangeable, 115 km/h (71 mph).
Z	Unspecified	130 km/h (81 mph)	"All types not applicable to other groups or temporarily set up for particular operations waiting four digit approvals"	A handful of tank wagons in Victoria were coded VTQZ from 1982, at the time to indicate higher speed when empty.
