= Matatua =

Matatua or Mataatua may refer to:

- Matatua (leafhopper), an insect genus in the tribe Empoascini
- Mātaatua, a voyaging canoe used by Polynesians to migrate to New Zealand in Māori tradition
- SS Matatua, a UK cargo ship shipwrecked and refloated in 1924

== See also ==
- HMNZS Matataua, of the Royal New Zealand Navy
- Mataguá, Cuba
- Matatā, North Island, New Zealand
- Matatu, Kenyan minibuses
