= List of shipwrecks in 1924 =

The list of shipwrecks in 1924 includes ships sunk, foundered, grounded, or otherwise lost during 1924.

table of contents
1924
Jan	Feb	Mar	Apr
May	Jun	Jul	Aug
Sep	Oct	Nov	Dec
Unknown date

== January ==
=== 1 January ===
List of shipwrecks: 1 January 1924
Ship	State	Description
Emma Giles	United States	The sidewheel passenger steamer collided with the cargo ship Steel Trader (United States) in heavy fog near the Little Choptank River in Maryland, suffering damage to her starboard side, including her paddle. She was towed to Baltimore, Maryland, repaired, and returned to service.

=== 3 January ===
List of shipwrecks: 3 January 1924
Ship	State	Description
Bertha	Germany	The cargo ship departed Jacksonville, Florida for Hamburg. No further trace, presumed foundered with the loss of all hands.
Florence	United Kingdom	The cargo ship sprang a leak and sank in the Atlantic Ocean off Buncrana, County Donegal, Ireland.

=== 4 January ===
List of shipwrecks: 4 January 1924
Ship	State	Description
Annemarie	Germany	The cargo ship ran aground at Dragør, Denmark. She was refloated on 7 January.
Donald Silver	United Kingdom	The schooner was driven ashore at Fischells, Newfoundland and was wrecked with the loss of five lives.

=== 5 January ===
List of shipwrecks: 5 January 1924
Ship	State	Description
Thetis	Greece	The cargo ship was struck by Diamant (Italy) at Istanbul, Turkey and was beached off Leander's Tower. She was refloated on 15 January.

=== 6 January ===
List of shipwrecks: 6 January 1924
Ship	State	Description
Juliane	United Kingdom	The auxiliary sailing vessel was in collision with Bur (Sweden) at Kiel, Schleswig-Holstein, Germany and sank.

=== 7 January ===
List of shipwrecks: 7 January 1924
Ship	State	Description
Angle	United Kingdom	The 120.5-foot (36.7 m), 222-ton steam trawler ran aground and was wrecked in a gale and snowstorm 6 miles (9.7 km) east northeast of Ramsey, Isle of Man on the Bahama Bank. Lost with all 14 crew.
Lynaes	Sweden	The schooner, on a voyage from Swansea, Glamorgan, United Kingdom to Lisbon, Portugal, was reported in the English Channel. No further trace, presumed foundered with the loss of all hands.
Macoris	Italy	The cargo ship foundered in the Mediterranean Sea 50 nautical miles (93 km) off Crete, Greece.
Nigretia	United Kingdom	The cargo ship departed Swansea, Glamorgan for Rouen, Seine-Inférieure, France. A lifebuoy from the ship washed up at Teignmouth, Devon at the end of January. Presumed foundered in the English Channel with the loss of all hands.
Odomari	Imperial Japanese Navy	The Odomari-class icebreaker ran aground at Oniwaki, Rishiri Island off the coast of Hokkaido in bad weather. Refloated and in drydock for repair by 4 February.

=== 8 January ===
List of shipwrecks: 8 January 1924
Ship	State	Description
Carena	United Kingdom	The cargo ship departed Liverpool, Lancashire for Penryn, Cornwall. No further trace, presumed foundered with the loss of all hands.
Dagmar	Denmark	The three-masted schooner collided with Oakhurst (Denmark) in the English Channel 20 nautical miles (37 km) east north east of Alderney, Channel Islands and sank. Her seven crew were rescued by Ashton (United Kingdom). Oakhurst was disabled in the collision. She was towed to Le Havre, Seine-Inférieure, France by a British steamship.
Fellside	United Kingdom	The coaster was wrecked at Three Cliffs Bay, Glamorgan with the loss of one of her fourteen crew .
J. W. Comeau	United Kingdom	The schooner sprang a leak in the Atlantic Ocean and was abandoned (39°53′N 62°57′W). Her crew were rescued by Ivar (Denmark).
Leif	Denmark	The schooner was in collision with William Mitchell (United Kingdom) of the Norwegian Coast. No further trace, presumed sunk with the loss of all but one of her crew. The survivor managed to clamber aboard William Mitchell.
Tempest	United Kingdom	The schooner was ramed by the fishing vessel Charles Boyes (United Kingdom) at Milford Haven, Penbrokeshire and sank.

=== 9 January ===
List of shipwrecks: 9 January 1924
Ship	State	Description
Adolph	France	The schooner foundered in the Bristol Channel 6 nautical miles (11 km) south west of the Scarweather Lightship (United Kingdom) with the loss of one of her six crew. Survivors were rescued by Devonia (United Kingdom).
Capitaine Winckler	France	The cargo ship ran aground at Calais, Pas-de-Calais. She was refloated on 23 January.
Feronia	Italy	The cargo ship sank in the Bay of Biscay 150 nautical miles (280 km) off the La Coubre Lighthouse (approximately 45°N 6°W). Her crew were rescued by Ontario (France).
Mont Rose	France	The cargo ship, which had departed Oran, Algeria for Rouen, Seine-Inférieure on 3 January, issued a distress call in the Atlantic Ocean. No further trace, presumed foundered with the loss of all hands.
River Lagan	United Kingdom	The cargo ship was driven ashore at Goodrington Sands, Devon. Her crew were rescued. She was refloated on 5 February.
Tasmania	Italy	The cargo ship was abandoned in the Bay of Biscay (44°20′N 11°20′W). Some of the survivors were rescued by Waaldijk (Netherlands).

=== 10 January ===
List of shipwrecks: 10 January 1924
Ship	State	Description
Ibukizan Maru	Japan	The cargo ship ran aground in Tokyo Bay. She was refloated on 23 January.
HMS L24	Royal Navy	The L-class submarine collided with the battleship HMS Resolution (Royal Navy) in the English Channel off Portland Bill, Dorset, and sank with the loss of her entire crew of 43.
Spurnpoint	United Kingdom	The cargo ship struck rocks in the Irish Sea off the Calf of Man, Isle of Man, and was abandoned. She was discovered derelict west of the Isle of Man by Mango (United Kingdom) and towed to Warrenpoint, County Down.
Vicen-Tita	Spain	The cargo ship was wrecked at Pasaia, Gipuzkoa with the loss of all but one of her crew.

=== 11 January ===
List of shipwrecks: 11 January 1924
Ship	State	Description
Cornelius H. Callaghan	United States	The schooner came ashore 8 nautical miles (15 km) from St. Andrews Bay, Florida. She broke her back and was a total loss.
Holendrecht	Netherlands	The cargo ship collided with Corea (United Kingdom) in the River Thames at Silvertown, London and sank. She was refloated on 17 January.
Maguy	France	The barque was abandoned in the Atlantic Ocean (43°50′N 17°14′W). Her crew were rescued by Boren (United Kingdom).
Rhenania	Germany	The cargo ship ran aground at Korsør, Denmark. She was refloated on 14 January.
Rolfe	United States	The 14-gross register ton, 45.4-foot (13.8 m) fishing vessel was wrecked without loss of life on a rock off Point Colpoys (56°20′N 133°12′W) in Sumner Strait in the Alexander Archipelago in Southeast Alaska. A small gasoline-powered motorboat rescued her crew.

=== 12 January ===
List of shipwrecks: 12 January 1924
Ship	State	Description
Helgoland	United Kingdom	The sailing ship ran aground at Black Rock, Tara, County Down and was wrecked. Her crew were saved.
Nordead	France	The hopper ship was driven ashore crewless at Seatown, Dorset, United Kingdom.
Ruth E. Merrill	United States	Carrying a cargo of coal, the 301-foot (92 m), 3,003-gross register ton six-masted schooner sank without loss of life in up to 20 feet (6.1 m) of water in Vineyard Sound — reportedly on L'Hommedieu Shoal — off West Chop, Martha's Vineyard, Massachusetts, after running aground on a shoal during a storm.

=== 13 January ===
List of shipwrecks: 13 January 1924
Ship	State	Description
Port Elliot	United Kingdom	The cargo ship ran aground at East Cape, North Island, New Zealand. Her crew were rescued. She was declared a total loss on 18 January.

=== 14 January ===
List of shipwrecks: 14 January 1924
Ship	State	Description
Annie M. Parker	Canada	The schooner was abandoned in the Atlantic Ocean (44°37′N 45°08′W). Her crew were rescued by Grootedijk (Netherlands).

=== 16 January ===
List of shipwrecks: 16 January 1924
Ship	State	Description
Bunholme	United Kingdom	The cargo ship ran aground in the River Plate off Martín García Island, Uruguay. She was refloated on 24 February.
Clan Kennedy	United Kingdom	The cargo ship ran aground in the North Sea off Sizewell, Suffolk. Although she was refloated on 19 January, she was declared a total loss.
USS Tacoma	United States Navy	The Denver-class cruiser ran aground on the Blanquilla Reef off Veracruz, Mexico. During attempts at refloating over the following week, four crew were lost. Declared a total loss, she was stricken on 7 February and sold for scrap on 5 September.

=== 17 January ===
List of shipwrecks: 17 January 1924
Ship	State	Description
Polaris	Sweden	The cargo ship collided with Allegro (Sweden) at Helsingborg and sank.

=== 18 January ===
List of shipwrecks: 18 January 1924
Ship	State	Description
Coalisland	United Kingdom	The cargo ship collided with the lighter Linie (United Kingdom) in the River Clyde at Bowling, West Dunbartonshire and was beached. She was refloated on 21 January.

=== 19 January ===
List of shipwrecks: 19 January 1924
Ship	State	Description
Chilier	Belgium	The cargo ship, which had departed from Antwerp for Savannah, Georgia, United States, was reported in the Atlantic Ocean (50°N 21°W). No further trace, presumed foundered with the loss of all hands.

=== 21 January ===
List of shipwrecks: 21 January 1924
Ship	State	Description
Hadnot	United States	The tanker ran aground at Nyborg, Denmark. She was refloated on 25 January.
Thor Minor	Norway	The cargo ship came ashore at Kastrup, Denmark. She was refloated on 25 January.

=== 23 January ===
List of shipwrecks: 23 January 1924
Ship	State	Description
Clumberhall	United Kingdom	The cargo ship ran aground at Mykolaiv, Soviet Union. She was refloated on 29 January.
Port Lyttleton	United Kingdom	The cargo ship ran aground at Launceston, Tasmania, Australia. She was refloated on 26 January.
Prospect	United Kingdom	The cargo ship suffered a fractured propeller shaft, which punctured her hull. She foundered in the Irish Sea off Skibbereen, County Cork, Ireland.

=== 24 January ===
List of shipwrecks: 24 January 1924
Ship	State	Description
Ithakos	Greece	The cargo ship ran aground in the River Plate off Martín García Island, Uruguay. She was refloated on 31 January.
Salford	United Kingdom	The cargo ship collided with Oroya (United Kingdom) in the River Mersey at New Brighton, Cheshire and was beached.
Talisman	Norway	The cargo ship ran aground at Buenos Aires, Argentina. Although refloated on 30 January, she grounded again.

=== 25 January ===
List of shipwrecks: 25 January 1924
Ship	State	Description
Sigrid	United States	During a voyage from Seattle, Washington, to Katalla, Territory of Alaska, the 11-gross register ton, 36.2-foot (11.0 m) fishing vessel was wrecked on a reef off the east coast of Vancouver Island 7 nautical miles (13 km; 8.1 mi) south of Campbell River, British Columbia, Canada. All three people aboard survived.

=== 26 January ===
List of shipwrecks: 26 January 1924
Ship	State	Description
Maid of Spetsai	United Kingdom	The cargo ship collided with Maiella (Italy) in the English Channel 43 nautical miles (80 km) off the Casquets, Channel Islands and sank. Her crew were rescued.
S. B. Hirtle	United Kingdom	The schooner ran aground at Saint-Pierre, Saint Pierre and Miquelon. She was refloated on 23 February.

=== 27 January ===
List of shipwrecks: 27 January 1924
Ship	State	Description
El Monte	United States	The cargo ship came ashore 10 nautical miles (19 km) north of Le Havre, Seine-Inférieure, France. She was refloated on 2 February.
Halstead	United Kingdom	The cargo ship sank in the Niger River at Atani, Nigeria.
Mary Horlock	United Kingdom	The cargo ship was abandoned in the Pacific Ocean (approximately 32°N 153°E). Her crew were rescued by President Taft (United States).
Vladimir	Yugoslavia	The cargo ship ran aground at Port-Saint-Louis-du-Rhône, Bouches du Rhône, France. She was refloated on 2 February.

=== 28 January ===
List of shipwrecks: 28 January 1924
Ship	State	Description
Midland	United States	The cargo ship was destroyed by fire at Washington, D.C.
Tigris	Belgium	The cargo ship collided with Begonia (Sweden) in the North Sea off Vlissingen, Netherlands and was beached.

=== 31 January ===
List of shipwrecks: 31 January 1924
Ship	State	Description
Tom C. Powell	United States	The steamer struck an obstruction and sank off Wilson Light between Paducah, Kentucky and Nashville, a total loss. Five crew killed.

== February ==
=== 1 February ===
List of shipwrecks: 1 February 1924
Ship	State	Description
Erato	Netherlands	The cargo ship ran aground off Falsterbo, Sweden. She was refloated on 4 February.
Maid of Scotland	United Kingdom	The schooner collided with Perene (Peru) in the Atlantic Ocean 3.5 nautical miles (6.5 km) south of Partridge Island, Nova Scotia, Canada and sank with the loss of four crew. Perene also lost four crew.

=== 3 February ===
List of shipwrecks: 3 February 1924
Ship	State	Description
Aimée Maria	France	The cargo ship was driven ashore at La Seyne-sur-Mer, Var. She was refloated on 29 February.
Moldegaard	Norway	The cargo ship ran aground at Cape Pappas, Greece. She was refloated on 6 February.

=== 6 February ===
List of shipwrecks: 6 February 1924
Ship	State	Description
British Light	United Kingdom	The tanker ran aground at Port Eads, Louisiana, United States. She was refloated on 10 February.
Choko Maru	Japan	The cargo ship foundered off Funakawa with the loss of all hands.
Hercules	United Kingdom	The dredger was struck by Brest (France) and sunk at Newhaven, Sussex.
Ikuta Maru No.1	Japan	The coaster collided with Kaga Maru (Japan) at Genkainada and sank with the loss of four lives.
President Leguia	Peru	The cargo ship was destroyed by fire at Callao.

=== 8 February ===
List of shipwrecks: 8 February 1924
Ship	State	Description
Hwa Wu	China	The cargo ship ran aground at Nine Pins. She was refloated and towed to Hong Kong by Keswick (United Kingdom) and beached.
Kong Haakon	Norway	The cargo ship suffered the failure of her steering gear and was beached north of Bergen, Norway.
Mora	United Kingdom	The cargo ship came ashore at Cape St. Vincent, Portugal and was wrecked. She was abandoned on 9 February with the loss of seven of her 29 crew.
Port de Brest	France	The cargo ship departed Bordeaux, Gironde for Dakar, French West Africa. No further trace, presumed foundered with the loss of all hands.
Usa Maru No.1	Japan	The cargo ship departed Hakodate for Tokyo. No further trace, presumed foundered with the loss of all hands.

=== 9 February ===
List of shipwrecks: 9 February 1924
Ship	State	Description
Elvier	United Kingdom	The cargo ship ran aground at Poole, Dorset. She was refloated on 16 February.
Persia	Italy	The cargo ship came ashore on the Amherst Rock at the mouth of the Yangtze, China. She was beached on the Tungsha Spit. Persia was refloated on 10 February.

=== 10 February ===
List of shipwrecks: 10 February 1924
Ship	State	Description
Brook	United Kingdom	The cargo ship collided with Capulin (United States) in the North Sea off the Shipwash Lightship (United Kingdom). She was severely damaged and was taken in tow by Felixtowe (United Kingdom). The tow subsequently parted and Brook was abandoned. Her crew were rescued by Felixtowe.

=== 11 February ===
List of shipwrecks: 11 February 1924
Ship	State	Description
Hortensius	United Kingdom	The cargo ship ran aground at San Nicolás, Buenos Aires, Argentina. She was refloated on 24 February.
Mallock	United Kingdom	The cargo ship ran aground at Breaksea Point, Glamorgan. Her crew were rescued by Fastnet (United Kingdom). She was refloated on 18 February.

=== 12 February ===
List of shipwrecks: 12 February 1924
Ship	State	Description
Lord Hamilton	United Kingdom	The ship ran aground on the Goodwin Sands, Kent. Two of her four crew were rescued by the motor boat Champion (United Kingdom).
République	France	The five-masted schooner caught fire in the Atlantic Ocean off the Canary Islands, Spain (32°03′N 13°55′W) and was abandoned. All eighteen crew were rescued by Romeu (Spain). She came ashore between Agadir and Cape Juby, Spanish Morocco on 1 April.

=== 13 February ===
List of shipwrecks: 13 February 1924
Ship	State	Description
Rita Zorvetta	Italy	The cargo ship ran aground off St. David's Lighthouse, Bermuda in heavy weather. No casualties and her cargo was salvaged. She was abandoned on 14 February, She later broke in two and was a total loss.

=== 18 February ===
List of shipwrecks: 18 February 1924
Ship	State	Description
Colombia	United States	The cargo ship was wrecked in Coos Bay.
Iris	Sweden	The cargo ship was damaged by ice and sank 11 nautical miles (20 km) south of Russarö, Finland.
Ivanhoe	United States	The tug collided with Gerry (United States) at Kilvonkull and sank with the loss of a crew member.
Telegraph	United Kingdom	The schooner ran aground on the Saint Brandon Rocks and sank. Her crew survived.
The Viscount	United Kingdom	The cargo ship ran aground on the Murdoch Rock, Loch Torridon and was abandoned by her crew.
Visna	Norway	The cargo ship ran aground 5 nautical miles (9.3 km) north north west of Falsterbo, Sweden. She was refloated on 23 February.

=== 20 February ===
List of shipwrecks: 20 February 1924
Ship	State	Description
Lois	United States	While at anchor with no one aboard, the 21-gross register ton motor vessel was driven ashore on Pitt Island (58.1089°N 135.4519°W) in the harbor at Hoonah, Territory of Alaska, by an ice floe, then was destroyed by a fire that occurred when her captain went aboard with a lantern, triggering an explosion. He survived with burns about the head.
Swallow	United States	After her gasoline engine stopped running during a voyage in Southeast Alaska from Ketchikan to Metlakatla, the 10-gross register ton, 32.2-foot (9.8 m) fishing vessel drifted onto a rock and was wrecked in Nichols Passage off Driest Point (55°10′40″N 131°36′15″W). Her crew of three survived. Her wreck later slid off the rock and sank in deeper water, leaving only her mast above water, and by 23 February she had disappeared entirely.

=== 21 February ===
List of shipwrecks: 21 February 1924
Ship	State	Description
Helios	Sweden	The cargo ship was damaged by ice and sank off Holmstad.
Suki Maru	Japan	The cargo ship ran aground at Shimonoseki and sank.

=== 22 February ===
List of shipwrecks: 22 February 1924
Ship	State	Description
Assimina M. Embiricos	Greece	The cargo ship ran aground in the Scheldt. She broke in two the next day and was a total loss.

=== 24 February ===
List of shipwrecks: 24 February 1924
Ship	State	Description
Cyclops	United Kingdom	The dredger capsized and sank in the Firth of Forth 3 nautical miles (5.6 km) east south east of the Bass Rock.
Edvige	Italy	The cargo ship collided with Unione (Italy) at La Spezia and sank. Her crew were rescued.

=== 27 February ===
List of shipwrecks: 27 February 1924
Ship	State	Description
Ethel M. Bartlett	United Kingdom	The schooner foundered in the Atlantic Ocean (40°11′N 54°16′W). Her crew were rescued by Caldy Light (United Kingdom).

=== 28 February ===
List of shipwrecks: 28 February 1924
Ship	State	Description
Tatjana	Norway	The cargo ship came ashore on Effingham Island, Barclay Sound, British Columbia, Canada and was wrecked. Later raised and renamed Drammensfjord.

== March ==
=== 2 March ===
List of shipwrecks: 2 March 1924
Ship	State	Description
Director	United States	The 18-gross register ton fishing vessel was wrecked on the coast of Hinchinbrook Island off the south-central coast of the Territory of Alaska during a gale. Her crew of four survived.

=== 3 March ===
List of shipwrecks: 3 March 1924
Ship	State	Description
Gordon E. Moulton	United Kingdom	The schooner was abandoned in the Atlantic Ocean 15 nautical miles (28 km) off Burgeo, Newfoundland.
Gylsboda	Sweden	The cargo ship was damaged by ice and put into Åhus, where she sank. She was refloated on 6 March.
Patagonier	Belgium	The cargo ship ran aground in the Paraná River, Argentina. She was refloated on 11 March.

=== 4 March ===
List of shipwrecks: 4 March 1924
Ship	State	Description
Haine	Belgium	The ship was run into by Khiva (United Kingdom) at Antwerp and sank.
Oswin	Sweden	The cargo ship ran aground off Falsterbo. She was refloated on 9 March.

=== 5 March ===
List of shipwrecks: 5 March 1924
Ship	State	Description
Fennia	Finland	The cargo ship ran aground on Kalkgrundet, Baltic Sea. She slipped off the rocks and sank on 14 March.

=== 7 March ===
List of shipwrecks: 7 March 1924
Ship	State	Description
Buzen Maru	Japan	The cargo ship ran aground on Ganyūjima, in the Shimonoseki Strait. She was refloated on 12 March.

=== 8 March ===
List of shipwrecks: 8 March 1924
Ship	State	Description
Obernai	United Kingdom	The cargo ship sprang a leak and foundered in the Atlantic Ocean (46°49′N 58°10′W). Her crew were rescued by Kungsholm (Sweden).

=== 9 March ===
List of shipwrecks: 9 March 1924
Ship	State	Description
Eupatoria	Germany	The cargo ship ran aground on the Salmedina Bank, off the coast of Colombia. She was refloated on 17 March.
Sori	Italy	The cargo ship ran aground at Port Eads, Louisiana, United States. She was refloated on 12 March.

=== 10 March ===
List of shipwrecks: 10 March 1924
Ship	State	Description
Izgled	Yugoslavia	The cargo ship struck the bank of the Panama Canal and sprang a leak. She was consequently beached. She was refloated on 11 March.

=== 11 March ===
List of shipwrecks: 11 March 1924
Ship	State	Description
Santiago	United States	The cargo ship sank in a storm 60 miles south east of Cape Hatteras. Twenty Five crew killed.
Wyoming	United States	Carrying a cargo of coal, the 329-foot (100 m), 3,730-gross register ton six-masted schooner foundered in a storm while at anchor off the coast of Massachusetts in Pollock Rip Channel off the Pollock Rip Lightship in Nantucket Sound. Her entire crew — reported as both 13 and 14 by different sources — was lost. After finding the wreck with some of its masts still above water, the cutter USCGC Acushnet ( United States Coast Guard) leveled the wreck because it was a danger to navigation.

=== 12 March ===
List of shipwrecks: 12 March 1924
Ship	State	Description
Glenmay	Isle of Man	The coaster ran aground at Ballyquinton Point, County Down, United Kingdom. She was refloated on 15 March.
Tennia	Finland	The cargo ship was damaged by ice at Malmö, Sweden and was abandoned.

=== 13 March ===
List of shipwrecks: 13 March 1924
Ship	State	Description
Hannevig Brothers	United Kingdom	The cargo ship ran aground at Cardiff, Glamorgan. She was refloated on 17 March.
Niki	Greece	The cargo ship ran aground in the River Neath, Glamorgan. She was refloated on 17 March.
Sygna	Norway	The cargo ship ran aground at Tjøtta, Norway. She was refloated on 17 March.

=== 14 March ===
List of shipwrecks: 14 March 1924
Ship	State	Description
Deva	United Kingdom	The sand grab caught fire off Liverpool, Lancashire. The barge Ellesburn (United Kingdom) took off her crew before she capsized and sank.

=== 16 March ===
List of shipwrecks: 16 March 1924
Ship	State	Description
Hypolite Worms	France	The cargo ship was in collision with Sarthe (United Kingdom) off Le Havre, Seine-Inférieure and sank. Her crew were rescued by Sarthe.

=== 17 March ===
List of shipwrecks: 17 March 1924
Ship	State	Description
Bilbeis	United Kingdom	The passenger ship ran aground at Nyriros, Turkey and was abandoned.

=== 19 March ===
List of shipwrecks: 19 March 1924
Ship	State	Description
43	Imperial Japanese Navy	The Ro-16-class submarine was rammed and sunk by the light cruiser Tatsuta (Imperial Japanese Navy) at Sasebo, Japan, and sank with the loss of all 44 crew.

=== 21 March ===
List of shipwrecks: 21 March 1924
Ship	State	Description
Chi Ping	United Kingdom	The cargo ship struck rocks in the Yangtze at Chunglingtan and was beached. She was refloated on 29 March.
Warren	United States	The cargo ship sank at Shanghai, China.

=== 22 March ===
List of shipwrecks: 22 March 1924
Ship	State	Description
Dorothy L. Brinckmann	United States	The schooner came ashore on the Oregon Islet and was wrecked. Her crew were rescued.
Glyndon	United States	The cargo ship foundered in the Atlantic Ocean 52 nautical miles (96 km) south east of Cape Hatteras, North Carolina with the loss of three crew. Survivors were rescued by Cananova (United States).
Ottar Jarl	Norway	The cargo ship collided with British Princess (United Kingdom) in the North Sea (53°11′00″N 1°18′30″E) and sank. All 22 crew were rescued by British Princess.
River Dare	United Kingdom	The cargo ship foundered in the Atlantic Ocean 10 nautical miles (19 km) north of Cape St. Vincent, Portugal. All 24 crew were rescued by Lexa Maersk (Denmark). Both ship's cats perished, but her pigeons were released before she sank.

=== 24 March ===
List of shipwrecks: 24 March 1924
Ship	State	Description
Matatua	United Kingdom	The cargo ship collided with American Merchant (United States) in the River Thames at Canvey Island, Essex with the loss of eight crew. She was beached at Mucking. She was refloated on 3 April.
President Monroe	United States	The ocean liner ran aground on the Florida Reef. She was refloated on 27 March.

=== 25 March ===
List of shipwrecks: 25 March 1924
Ship	State	Description
Hyacinth	United Kingdom	The 80.1-foot (24.4 m), 79-ton steam drifter sprung a leak and sank 50 miles (80 km) southwest of the Lune lightship. All crew were rescued by the schooner Ellen Anne (United Kingdom).

=== 26 March ===
List of shipwrecks: 26 March 1924
Ship	State	Description
Pelicano	Peru	The cargo ship was destroyed by fire in the Atlantic Ocean off Zorritos.
Tokufuku Maru	Japan	The cargo ship collided with Heimdal (Germany) in the English Channel 3 nautical miles (5.6 km) south of Dungeness, Kent and sank with the loss of 23 of her 40 crew. Survivors were rescued by Heimdal and Hans Hemsoth (Germany).

=== 31 March ===
List of shipwrecks: 31 March 1924
Ship	State	Description
Plymouth	United States	The 199-foot (60.7 m), 474-gross register ton schooner barge sank with the loss of five lives in the North Atlantic Ocean during a heavy snowstorm and gale off New Jersey in 65 feet (20 m) of water.
Pocono	United States	The 150-foot (45.7 m) (?), 698-gross register ton schooner barge sank in the North Atlantic Ocean during a heavy snowstorm and gale 1.6 nautical miles (3.0 km; 1.8 mi) off Sea Bright Beach, New Jersey, in 60 feet (18 m) of water. Her wreck is known as the "Rudder Wreck."

=== Unknown date ===
List of shipwrecks: Unknown date 1924
Ship	State	Description
Pelotas	Brazil	The cargo ship foundered in the Atlantic Ocean. Her crew were rescued by San Gaspar (United Kingdom) and landed at Hamilton, Bermuda on 17 March.

== April ==
=== 2 April ===
List of shipwrecks: 2 April 1924
Ship	State	Description
Bella Vista	Portugal	The barque was dismasted in the Atlantic Ocean and abandoned by her crew. Seven crew were rescued on 5 April by Starlight (flag unknown).
Liberty	United States	The cargo ship ran aground at Liberty. She was refloated on 7 April.
Malaya	United States	The passenger ship ran aground on Titan Island, Amoy, China and was wrecked. She was on a voyage from Manila, Philippines to Ningpo.
Menominee	United States	The tug ran aground at Liberty whilst going to the assistance of Liberty. She was refloated the next day.
Otto Ippen 20	Germany	The cargo ship sank at Stralsund, Vorpommern.

=== 3 April ===
List of shipwrecks: 3 April 1924
Ship	State	Description
Frangestan	United Kingdom	The passenger ship caught fire and sank in the Red Sea (18°44′N 39°02′E). Her 1,200-plus passengers and crew were rescued by Clan Maciver (United Kingdom).
Rica	France	The cargo ship ran aground at Thyna, Tunisia. She was refloated on 7 April.
Westbury	United Kingdom	The cargo ship was driven ashore 22 nautical miles (41 km) west of the Quéquen Lighthouse, Argentina. She was a total loss. Her crew were rescued.

=== 4 April ===
List of shipwrecks: 4 April 1924
Ship	State	Description
Admiral Rodman	United States	The cargo ship ran aground at Point Calvert, British Columbia, Canada. She was refloated on 18 April.
Dover Maru	Japan	The cargo ship ran aground at Otomari, Sakhalin. She was refloated on 7 April.

=== 5 April ===
List of shipwrecks: 5 April 1924
Ship	State	Description
Sierra Grande	Belgium	The cargo ship collided with West Inskip (United States) in the Scheldt at Bath, Netherlands and sank. The wreck was broken up in situ in June 1924.

=== 6 April ===
List of shipwrecks: 6 April 1924
Ship	State	Description
Jacques Coeur	France	The cargo ship caught fire in the Atlantic Ocean and was abandoned (46°30′N 31°40′W). Her crew were rescued by N.F.C. (France).
Turlaid	Estonia	The schooner came ashore at Meshedyn, Spanish Morocco. She broke up the next day and was a total loss. Her crew were rescued by breeches buoy.

=== 7 April ===
List of shipwrecks: 7 April 1924
Ship	State	Description
Anahuac	United States	The cargo ship came ashore at Bellport, New York and was a total loss. Her crew were rescued.
Fladen Lightship	Sweden	The lightship was destroyed by fire. Her crew were rescued.
HMS L25	Royal Navy	The L-class submarine ran aground off The Needles, Isle of Wight. She was refloated later that day.
Sainte Anne	France	The cargo ship collided with Blois (France) the English Channel (50°40′N 0°10′W). Her crew were rescued by Blois.

=== 8 April ===
List of shipwrecks: 8 April 1924
Ship	State	Description
Bee	United States	The cargo ship was a total loss off Maui, Hawaii.
Maple Branch	United Kingdom	The cargo ship ran aground on the Mala Bank, Ecuador. She was refloated on 17 May.

=== 9 April ===
List of shipwrecks: 9 April 1924
Ship	State	Description
Monte Pasubio	Italy	The cargo ship was driven ashore on the Argentine coast and was a total loss.
Wyrallah	United Kingdom	The coaster collided with Dilkera (United Kingdom) off Port Phillip Heads, Victoria, Australia and sank with the loss of eight crew.

=== 10 April ===
List of shipwrecks: 10 April 1924
Ship	State	Description
Sirius	France	The schooner collided with the fishing vessel Suzanne et Marie (France) in the English Channel off Boulogne, Pas-de-Calais and sank. Her crew were rescued.

=== 11 April ===
List of shipwrecks: 11 April 1924
Ship	State	Description
Nunnington	United Kingdom	The cargo ship departed Swansea, Glamorgan for Sables. No further trace, presumed foundered with the loss of all hands.

=== 12 April ===
List of shipwrecks: 12 April 1924
Ship	State	Description
HMAS Australia	Royal Australian Navy	HMAS Australia sinking. Washington Naval Treaty: The decommissioned Indefatigable-class battlecruiser was scuttled in the Tasman Sea off the coast of Australia 25 nautical miles (46 km; 29 mi) northeast of the Sydney Heads.
Princess Louise	United Kingdom	The schooner was driven ashore at Cardiff, Glamorgan and was a total loss. Her crew survived.

=== 13 April ===
List of shipwrecks: 13 April 1924
Ship	State	Description
Buchanness	United Kingdom	The cargo liner suffered a failure of her propeller shaft off Start Point in the English Channel and consequently drifted ashore at Burhou, Alderney Channel Islands. All on board were rescued by Baron Cawdor (United Kingdom) and RFA Slavol (Royal Navy).

=== 14 April ===
List of shipwrecks: 14 April 1924
Ship	State	Description
Tokwa Maru	Japan	The cargo ship ran aground near Marotsu, Yamaguchi. She was refloated on 17 April.

=== 17 April ===
List of shipwrecks: 17 April 1924
Ship	State	Description
Ran	Sweden	The cargo ship ran aground on Middelgrunden Øresund. She was refloated on 22 April.

=== 19 April ===
List of shipwrecks: 19 April 1924
Ship	State	Description
Mikuni Maru	Japan	The coaster caught fire and was abandoned off Hinomisaki Point.

=== 21 April ===
List of shipwrecks: 21 April 1924
Ship	State	Description
Flandria	Sweden	The cargo liner came ashore near Hirtshals, Denmark. All on board were rescued. She was refloated on 27 April.
Llewellyn Howland	United States	Carrying a cargo of fuel oil, the tanker ran aground on Seal Ledge — a reef off Brenton Point in Newport, Rhode Island — broke up, and sank without loss of life in up to 30 feet (9.1 m) of water at 41°26′05″N 071°20′53″W. She was a total loss.
Paul Beau	United Kingdom	The cargo ship collided with Les Fils de Doumer (France) 40 nautical miles (74 km) from Canton, China and was beached. She was refloated on 27 April.

=== 22 April ===
List of shipwrecks: 22 April 1924
Ship	State	Description
Aldebaran	Germany	The cargo ship came ashore on Saaremaa, Estonia and was abandoned by her crew. She was refloated on 27 April.
Zencons	Latvia	The three-masted schooner came ashore on the west coast of Skagen, Denmark and was abandoned by her crew.

=== 23 April ===
List of shipwrecks: 23 April 1924
Ship	State	Description
Garthway	United Kingdom	The cargo ship ran aground on Santa María Island, Galapagos Islands and was a total loss.

=== 24 April ===
List of shipwrecks: 24 April 1924
Ship	State	Description
Java Maru	Japan	The cargo ship ran aground in the Inland Sea of Japan. She was refloated on 30 April.
Gannet	United Kingdom	The passenger ship sprang a leak in the North Sea off Berwick-upon-Tweed, Northumberland and was abandoned.

=== 25 April ===
List of shipwrecks: 25 April 1924
Ship	State	Description
Essex Abbey	United Kingdom	The cargo ship ran aground at Punta Entinas, Spain. She was refloated in early May, arriving at Gibraltar on 6 May for drydocking and repairs.

=== 26 April ===
List of shipwrecks: 26 April 1924
Ship	State	Description
Aurania	Italy	The cargo ship collided with Norrtelje (Sweden) in the Bay of Biscay off Ouessant, Finistère. Her crew were rescued by Norrtelje.
Robert Dollar II	United States	The cargo ship was wrecked in the Yangtze 50 nautical miles (93 km) downstream of Chunking, China with heavy loss of life

=== 27 April ===
List of shipwrecks: 27 April 1924
Ship	State	Description
City of Singapore	United Kingdom	The cargo ship caught fire at Adelaide, South Australia. A fireman was killed by an onboard explosion whilst fighting the fire. Having sunk, she was refloated on 5 May.
Martha	United States	While anchored with no one aboard during a blizzard, the 23.3-gross register ton schooner was washed onto a reef and wrecked at the east-northeast entrance to Catons Harbor (54°24′N 162°32′W) on Sanak Island in the Sanak Islands in the Gulf of Alaska.

=== 28 April ===
List of shipwrecks: 28 April 1924
Ship	State	Description
Dios Irmaos	Brazil	The sailing ship suffered an onboard explosion of her cargo and capsized at Pernambuco.
Ethel	United Kingdom	The Thames barge foundered in the Thames Estuary off the Maplin Sands, Essex. Both crew were rescued by the yacht Vanity (United Kingdom).
James W. Parker	United Kingdom	The schooner ran aground at North Sydney, Nova Scotia, Canada. She was declared a total loss, but was refloated on 1 May.
Spreewald	Germany	The cargo liner ran aground at Emden, Germany. She was refloated on 29 April.

=== 29 April ===
List of shipwrecks: 29 April 1924
Ship	State	Description
Lewis Luckenbach	United States	The cargo ship ran aground at Philadelphia, Pennsylvania. She was refloated on 4 May.

=== 30 April ===
List of shipwrecks: 30 April 1924
Ship	State	Description
Aviateur Genthon	France	The auxiliary sailing ship ran aground at Alicante, Spain and was wrecked.
Cragness	United Kingdom	The cargo ship ran aground at Barracouta Point, Portuguese East Africa and was abandoned. Her crew were rescued by Lady Denison Pender (United Kingdom). She was declared a total loss.

== May ==
=== 1 May ===
List of shipwrecks: 1 May 1924
Ship	State	Description
Ootmarsum	Netherlands	The cargo ship ran aground in the Paraná River, Argentina. She was refloated on 16 May.

=== 2 May ===
List of shipwrecks: 2 May 1924
Ship	State	Description
Seewolf	Germany	The auxiliary sailing vessel caught fire at Dieppe, Seine-Inférieure, France and sank. She was refloated on 5 May.
Trevier	Belgium	The cargo ship ran aground in the Paraná River, Argentina. She was refloated on 16 May.

=== 5 May ===
List of shipwrecks: 5 May 1924
Ship	State	Description
Mistletoe	United States	Operating as a fishing excursion vessel, the 153-foot (46.6 m), 362-gross register ton sidewheel paddle steamer burned to the waterline and sank in 42 feet (13 m) of water in the North Atlantic Ocean off Jamaica Bay, New York, at 40°32.055′N 073°50.900′W. All 85 people on board survived.
Nora Salieri	Greece	The cargo ship ran aground at Cape Blanc, on the border of French West Africa and Spanish Sahara. She was refloated on 8 May.

=== 7 May ===
List of shipwrecks: 7 May 1924
Ship	State	Description
St. Nikolai	United Kingdom	The barquentine ran aground at Saltburn, Yorkshire. She broke up and was a total loss.
Yeddo	Sweden	The cargo ship collided with Bärenfels (Germany) in the Scheldt at Fort Philip. She was beached but subsequently sank.

=== 8 May ===
List of shipwrecks: 8 May 1924
Ship	State	Description
Eugenia	Greece	The cargo ship ran aground in the Paraná River, Argentina. She was refloated on 12 May.
Evelyn	United Kingdom	The schooner foundered in the Atlantic Ocean 150 nautical miles (280 km) east south east of Sable Island, Nova Scotia, Canada.
Kinghorn	United Kingdom	The cargo ship came ashore on the south coast of Gran Canaria, Canary Islands, Spain. She was refloated on 12 May.
R. R. Govin	United States	The four-masted schooner came ashore on Bodies Island, North Carolina and was wrecked.
Valnegra	Italy	The cargo ship ran aground in the Paraná River. She was refloated on 12 May.
Volturno	Italy	The cargo ship ran aground in the Paraná River. She was refloated on 12 May.

=== 9 May ===
List of shipwrecks: 9 May 1924
Ship	State	Description
Kamouraska	United Kingdom	The cargo ship came ashore at Schooner Pond, Nova Scotia, Canada. She was refloated on 12 May.
Neko	United Kingdom	The whaler ran aground at Cabo Frio, Brazil and was wrecked. Her crew were rescued by Sevilla (United Kingdom).

=== 10 May ===
List of shipwrecks: 10 May 1924
Ship	State	Description
Marques de Campo	Spain	The cargo ship ran aground at Dar El Beïda, Algeria. She was a total loss.
Panviejo	Peru	The cargo ship caught fire and was abandoned at sea.

=== 12 May ===
List of shipwrecks: 12 May 1924
Ship	State	Description
Glenamoy	United Kingdom	The cargo liner ran aground on Video Island, China. Her passengers were taken off by another ship. She was refloated on 13 June.
Ngahere	United Kingdom	The cargo ship came ashore at Greymouth, South Island, New Zealand and was wrecked.
Shinfuku Maru	Japan	The cargo ship ran aground at Maska, Sakhalin. She was refloated on 2 June.

=== 15 May ===
List of shipwrecks: 15 May 1924
Ship	State	Description
Polarhavet	Denmark	The cargo ship ran aground at Söderhamn, Sweden. She was refloated on 19 May.
Trane	Norway	The cargo ship sank in the Raz de Sein, France. Her crew survived.

=== 17 May ===
List of shipwrecks: 17 May 1924
Ship	State	Description
Gunter	Germany	The auxiliary sailing vessel collided with Kasan (Denmark) in the Kattegat and sank. Her crew were rescued by Kasan.

=== 18 May ===
List of shipwrecks: 18 May 1924
Ship	State	Description
Alderney	United Kingdom	The coaster collided with Ewell (United Kingdom) in the River Thames at Victoria Embankment and sank. She was refloated on 22 May.
Orinoco	United States	The freighter's hull split in two after her seams opened up and she sank in a storm in Lake Superior between Michipicoten Island and Whitefish Point. Most of the crew abandoned ship in her lifeboats, ten in one and nine in the other. One person in each boat died of exposure. The Captain, chief engineer and helmsman remained on board and died.

=== 19 May ===
List of shipwrecks: 19 May 1924
Ship	State	Description
Magda	Germany	The coaster was sunk in the Ems by the explosion of her boiler.

=== 20 May ===
List of shipwrecks: 20 May 1924
Ship	State	Description
Odysseus	Greece	The cargo ship ran aground ion the Paraná River, Argentina. She was refloated on 23 May.
Orinoco	United States	The cargo ship foundered in Lake Superior with the loss of five of her 22 crew.
Utopia	flag unknown	The sailing ship was wrecked on St François Island, Seychelles. Her crew were rescued by Aiglon (flag unknown).

=== 21 May ===
List of shipwrecks: 21 May 1924
Ship	State	Description
Hoover and Madison		The cargo ship collided with J. S. Ashley (United States) in Lake Superior and was beached at Duluth, Minnesota, where she broke in two.
Jan van Ryswyck	Belgium	The cargo ship was wrecked on Longstone Rock, Farne Islands, United Kingdom. Her crew survived.
Koyei Maru	Japan	The cargo ship foundered off Choshi, Kazusa with the loss of all hands.
State of Ohio	United States	The cargo ship was destroyed by fire at Cleveland, Ohio.

=== 23 May ===
List of shipwrecks: 23 May 1924
Ship	State	Description
Lothar Bohlen	United Kingdom	The cargo ship ran aground in the Dardanelles. She was refloated on 30 May.
Neisei Maru	Japan	The cargo ship ran aground on the Korean coast. She was refloated and then beached.

=== 26 May ===
List of shipwrecks: 26 May 1924
Ship	State	Description
Labourdonnais	United Kingdom	The tug ran aground on a reef off Flat Island, Mauritius and was wrecked.

=== 27 May ===
List of shipwrecks: 27 May 1924
Ship	State	Description
Aulne	France	The cargo ship came ashore at Ras Amar, Tunisia and was abandoned by her crew. She was refloated on 9 June.
Tsugaru	Imperial Japanese Navy	The decommissioned minelayer was scuttled with explosive charges in the Pacific Ocean off Yokosuka, Japan.

=== 28 May ===
List of shipwrecks: 28 May 1924
Ship	State	Description
Asahi Maru	Japan	The cargo ship sprang a leak off Wakannai, Hokkaidō, Japan, and was beached.

=== 29 May ===
List of shipwrecks: 29 May 1924
Ship	State	Description
Cliffmore	United Kingdom	The coaster struck the Oxcar Rocks in the Firth of Forth and was beached. Her crew were rescued. She sank on 2 June. She was refloated on 9 July and beached at Cramond, Lothian.

=== Unknown date ===
List of shipwrecks: Unknown date 1924
Ship	State	Description
Kobasan Maru	Japan	The cargo ship ran aground at Cape Ashizuri. She had broken up by 10 May and was a total loss.

== June ==
=== 3 June ===
List of shipwrecks: 3 June 1924
Ship	State	Description
Pogor	United States	While beached on Warren Island in the Alexander Archipelago in Southeast Alaska for repairs, the 12-gross register ton, 28-foot (8.5 m) motor vessel was destroyed by fire. Her crew of two survived.

=== 5 June ===
List of shipwrecks: 5 June 1924
Ship	State	Description
Olga Elisabeth	Germany	The cargo ship was abandoned in the North Sea 230 nautical miles (430 km) east north east of the mouth of the River Tyne due to her cargo shifting. Her crew were rescued by the drifter Cheviotdale (United Kingdom). Olga Elisabeth sank on 6 June.

=== 6 June ===
List of shipwrecks: 6 June 1924
Ship	State	Description
B.B.-59	United States	The scow sank about 3 nautical miles (5.6 km; 3.5 mi) off Sandy Hook, New Jersey.
Potrebillos	Chile	The cargo ship ran aground on North Quiriquina Island and was a total loss.

=== 7 June ===
List of shipwrecks: 7 June 1924
Ship	State	Description
America	United States	The passenger ship struck a reef, capsized and sank off Isle Royale, Michigan. All 47 people on board survived.
Durham Coast	United Kingdom	The cargo ship collided with Sunoil (United Kingdom) in the River Mersey and was beached at Wallasey, Cheshire. She was refloated on 10 June.
Yahiko Maru	Japan	The cargo ship foundered in the Hainan Strait with the loss of all but three of her crew.

=== 10 June ===
List of shipwrecks: 10 June 1924
Ship	State	Description
Hesperos	Norway	The cargo ship struck a rock and was beached in the Molyneaux Estuário.

=== 11 June ===
List of shipwrecks: 11 June 1924
Ship	State	Description
Kayak	United Kingdom	The cargo ship ran aground in the Paraná River, Argentina. She was refloated on 17 June.

=== 12 June ===
List of shipwrecks: 12 June 1924
Ship	State	Description
White Rose	United Kingdom	The tug collided with Mungret (United Kingdom) in the Bristol Channel 2 nautical miles (3.7 km) off Penarth, Glamorgan and sank with the loss of two crew.

=== 13 June ===
List of shipwrecks: 13 June 1924
Ship	State	Description
Marianne	France	The schooner sprang a leak and foundered in the Atlantic Ocean (approximately 41°N 19°W). Her crew were rescued by the sailing ship Estrella III (Portugal).
Saarbrücken	Germany	The cargo liner ran aground at Tapagadja, Sabang, North Borneo. She was refloated on 17 June.

=== 14 June ===
List of shipwrecks: 14 June 1924
Ship	State	Description
HMS Firefly	Royal Navy	The Fly-class gunboat was sunk in the Euphrates by insurgents.

=== 16 June ===
List of shipwrecks: 16 June 1924
Ship	State	Description
Aladdin	Norway	The cargo ship ran aground at the Jussaroe Lighthouse, Hanko, Finland. She was refloated on 10 July.
Pamyat Lenina	Soviet Union	The cargo ship ran aground at Cape Aniwa, Sakhalin. She was refloated on 21 June.

=== 17 June ===
List of shipwrecks: 17 June 1924
Ship	State	Description
Haakon Jarl	Norway	The passenger ship collided with Kong Harald (Norway) in Vestfjorden, Norway, and sank with the loss of sixteen lives.
Shogiku Maru No.2	Japan	The cargo ship ran aground on the west coast of Sakhalin and subsequently sank.

=== 19 June ===
List of shipwrecks: 19 June 1924
Ship	State	Description
Espozende	Portugal	The sailing ship caught fire in the Atlantic Ocean (42°25′N 9°30′W) and was abandoned. Her crew were rescued by Masirah (United Kingdom).

=== 21 June ===
List of shipwrecks: 21 June 1924
Ship	State	Description
Clan Macmillan	United Kingdom	The cargo ship foundered in the Bay of Bengal 30 nautical miles (56 km) east of Table Island.
Metagama	United Kingdom	The passenger ship collided with Clara Camus (Italy) in the Atlantic Ocean 7 nautical miles (13 km) off Cape Race, Newfoundland. She was beached at St. John's.

=== 25 June ===
List of shipwrecks: 25 June 1924
Ship	State	Description
Dime	United States	A strong wind and high tide forced the 12-ton scow onto a beach on Golovin Spit (64°35′N 163°10′W), 0.5 nautical miles (0.9 km; 0.6 mi) from Golovin, Territory of Alaska. Her two-man crew survived. By the morning of 26 June, ice had crushed her where she lay.
Egremont Castle	United Kingdom	The cargo ship suffere an onboard explosion and fire. She was beached on the Bay Ridge mudflats, New York. Her crew were rescued by Bowes Castle (United Kingdom).
Robin Hood	United States	The five-masted schooner caught fire in the Atlantic Ocean between Key West, Florida and Tortugas. Her crew were rescued by a United States Revenue Cutter Service vessel.

=== 29 June ===
List of shipwrecks: 29 June 1924
Ship	State	Description
Thor	Denmark	The cargo liner capsized 8 nautical miles (15 km) south of the Drogden Lightship (Denmark) with the loss of eleven of the 25 people on board.

=== 30 June ===
List of shipwrecks: 30 June 1924
Ship	State	Description
Saguenay	United Kingdom	The passenger ship ran aground in the Saguenay River, Quebec, Canada. Her passengers were taken off.

== July ==
=== 1 July ===
List of shipwrecks: 1 July 1924
Ship	State	Description
Erik B	Denmark	The cargo ship ran aground at Norrskär, Finland. She was refloated on 5 July.
Kifune Maru No.3	Japan	The cargo ship ran aground and sank off Sendai.
Sankaty	United States	The cargo ship was destroyed by fire at Boston, Massachusetts.

=== 5 July ===
List of shipwrecks: 5 July 1924
Ship	State	Description
Three Rivers	United States	The cargo ship was destroyed by fire at Buenos Aires, Argentina.

=== 7 July ===
List of shipwrecks: 7 July 1924
Ship	State	Description
Pampa	Denmark	The schooner came ashore at Dunnet Head, Caithness, United Kingdom and was wrecked. All four crew survived.

=== 8 July ===
List of shipwrecks: 8 July 1924
Ship	State	Description
Admiral Cochrane	United Kingdom	The cargo ship ran aground in the Paraná River, Argentina. She was refloated on 25 July.

=== 9 July ===
List of shipwrecks: 9 July 1924
Ship	State	Description
Sunheath	United Kingdom	The cargo ship arrived at Karachi, India with defective boilers. Attempts to tow her into port were unsuccessful and she dragged ger anchors and came ashore. She was refloated on 6 December.

=== 10 July ===
List of shipwrecks: 10 July 1924
Ship	State	Description
Iwami	Imperial Japanese Navy	Washington Naval Treaty: The decommissioned Borodino-class battleship sank west of Jōgashima near the mouth of Tokyo Bay after being used as a target for Imperial Japanese Navy aircraft from 5 to 8 July.
Lismore	United Kingdom	The coaster capsized in the Irish Sea 15 nautical miles (28 km) off Newtown Head, County Waterford, Ireland with the loss of eighteen of her nineteen crew.
Ofanto	Italy	The coaster was abandoned in the Mediterranean Sea south of Sicily (36°21′N 13°45′E). Her crew were rescued by Andes Maru (Japan).
Niitaka Maru	Japan	The cargo ship ran aground at Chennampo and was a total loss.

=== 11 July ===
List of shipwrecks: 11 July 1924
Ship	State	Description
Martha Woermann	Germany	The cargo ship ran aground in the Forcados River, Nigeria. She was abandoned by her crew on 15 July, but was later reboarded. Martha Woermann was finally abandoned on 23 July, and was declared a total loss on 28 July.
Matsuyama Maru	Japan	The cargo ship foundered in the East China Sea west of the Gotō Islands with the loss of all but one of her crew.

=== 12 July ===
List of shipwrecks: 12 July 1924
Ship	State	Description
Olaf	United States	The 21-gross register ton salmon-fishing vessel sank in Cook Inlet on the south-central coast of the Territory of Alaska about 5 nautical miles (9.3 km; 5.8 mi) north of the mouth of the Kenai River at approximately 60°37′N 151°23′W. Her crew of three survived.

=== 15 July ===
List of shipwrecks: 15 July 1924
Ship	State	Description
Estrella	Norway	The cargo ship ran aground in the Paraná River, Argentina. She was refloated on 19 July.
Unten Maru	Japan	The cargo ship ran aground on Quelpart, Korea. She was refloated in early August, arriving at Shimonoseki under tow on 5 August for repairs.
Veerhaven	Netherlands	The cargo ship ran aground at Goredetsky, Kola Peninsula, Soviet Union. She was abandoned the next day, with her crew setting up camp in tents. She was refloated on 21 August.

=== 18 July ===
List of shipwrecks: 18 July 1924
Ship	State	Description
Olive	United States	During a gale, the 59-ton motor schooner was stranded in the northeast corner of Portage Bay (57°34′05″N 156°02′15″W) on the south coast of the Alaska Peninsula in the Territory of Alaska. Her crew of four survived. She was later salvaged, repaired, and returned to service.
Prilip	United States	After striking a rock in Eshomy Bay (60°28′30″N 147°58′30″W) on the south-central coast of the Territory of Alaska, the 33-gross register ton, 52.6-foot (16.0 m) motor vessel was beached for repairs, but a fire broke out which destroyed her on the beach before repairs could begin. Her crew of five survived.

=== 21 July ===
List of shipwrecks: 21 July 1924
Ship	State	Description
Friesland	Netherlands	The cargo ship capsized at Immingham, Lincolnshire, United Kingdom.

=== 23 July ===
List of shipwrecks: 23 July 1924
Ship	State	Description
HMAS Brisbane	Royal Australian Navy	The Town-class cruiser ran aground off Port Moresby, New Guinea. She was refloated later that day.
Freeland	United Kingdom	The cargo ship struck rocks in Ramsey Sound. She was beached at Goodwick Sands, Pembrokeshire.

=== 24 July ===
List of shipwrecks: 24 July 1924
Ship	State	Description
Cananova	United States	The cargo ship sank at New York.
Climax	United States	The tow steamer capsized in the Mississippi River above New Orleans. Five crewmen killed, 6 rescued.

=== 25 July ===
List of shipwrecks: 25 July 1904
Ship	State	Description
Hizen	Imperial Japanese Navy	Washington Naval Treaty: The decommissioned battleship was sunk as a gunnery target in the Bungo Channel.

=== 26 July ===
List of shipwrecks: 26 July 1924
Ship	State	Description
Libourne	France	The cargo ship ran aground at Whitehead, Nova Scotia, Canada. She was declared a total loss in early August.

=== 27 July ===
List of shipwrecks: 27 July 1924
Ship	State	Description
Daigo Maru	Japan	The 112.7-foot (34.4 m) steam trawler was sunk in a collision off Notoro.
Dairen Maru	Japan	The cargo ship collided with Shinpo Maru (Japan) 3 nautical miles (5.6 km) off Cape Nishinotoro, Karafuto and sank with heavy loss of life.

=== 28 July ===
List of shipwrecks: 28 July 1924
Ship	State	Description
Bergensfjord	Norway	Bergensfjord The passenger ship suffered an explosion in her engine room and caught fire off Bergen, Norway. She was beached.

=== 30 July ===
List of shipwrecks: 30 July 1924
Ship	State	Description
Adam Smith	United Kingdom	The cargo ship ran aground at Westport, County Mayo, Ireland. She was still aground on 6 August.
Italier	Belgium	The cargo ship foundered off Cape Villano, Algeria.

=== Unknown date ===
List of shipwrecks: Unknown date 1924
Ship	State	Description
D S S Co. No. 6	United States	Deemed unfit for further use, the 17-gross register ton scow was hauled onto the beach at Port Althorp (58°11′30″N 136°23′00″W) on the north coast of Chichagof Island in the Alexander Archipelago in Southeast Alaska, where she was wrecked.

== August ==
=== 1 August ===
List of shipwrecks: 1 August 1924
Ship	State	Description
Koun Maru No.1	Japan	The cargo ship ran aground and sank at Yetorofu.

=== 3 August ===
List of shipwrecks: 3 August 1924
Ship	State	Description
Linkmoor	United Kingdom	The cargo ship ran aground at Métis-sur-Mer, Quebec, Canada. She was refloated but later beached at Tadoussac. She was refloated on 4 August.
Lithgow	United States	While under tow by the vessel Meteor (United States) from St. Michael to Bethel, Territory of Alaska, with two crewmen aboard, the 370-ton river barge flooded in the Bering Sea 100 nautical miles (190 km; 120 mi) off the mouth of the Yukon River. Her house was washed overboard and her hull became submerged, but Meteor rescued her crew and towed her submerged lower hull to St. Michael for salvage.

=== 5 August ===
List of shipwrecks: 5 August 1924
Ship	State	Description
Everest	Spain	The cargo ship sprang a leak in the Mediterranean Sea and was beached at Mazagan, French Morocco.
Herbert	United States	Lying at anchor in fog with a cargo of sand on board, the 128-foot (39 m), 349-gross register ton lighter sank without loss of life in 100 feet (30 m) of water 3 nautical miles (5.6 km; 3.5 mi) east of Nahant, Massachusetts, at 42°25′05″N 070°51′25″W after the steamer City of Gloucester (flag unknown) accidentally rammed her.
Newhaven	France	The passenger ferry ran aground at Berneval-le-Grand, Seine-Inférieure, France. Her 125 passengers were able to walk ashore at low tide. She was refloated on 14 August.
River Ely	United Kingdom	The collier grounded on Mousehole Island, Cornwall. She was later towed to Penzance.

=== 8 August ===
List of shipwrecks: 8 August 1924
Ship	State	Description
Newglyn	United Kingdom	The cargo ship ran aground at the Whiteford Point Lighthouse, Llanelly, Glamorgan. She was declared a total loss on 14 August.

=== 10 August ===
List of shipwrecks: 10 August 1924
Ship	State	Description
Arctic	United States	The 669-gross register ton motor vessel was crushed by ice in the Chukchi Sea off the Territory of Alaska 16 nautical miles (30 km; 18 mi) south of Point Barrow and 5 nautical miles (9.3 km; 5.8 mi) southwest of Cape Smyth (71°17′35″N 156°47′20″W).
Urumea	Spain	The cargo ship collided with Tisnaren (Sweden) in the Atlantic Ocean off Cape Roca, Portugal. She was taken in tow by Endymion (United Kingdom) but the tow had to be cast off, and Urumea later sank.

=== 11 August ===
List of shipwrecks: 11 August 1924
Ship	State	Description
Arlington Court	United Kingdom	The cargo ship ran aground at Buenos Aires, Argentina. She was refloated on 22 August.

=== 13 August ===
List of shipwrecks: 13 August 1924
Ship	State	Description
Orowaiti	United States	The tanker ran aground at Point Buchon, California. She was abandoned as a total loss on 5 September.

=== 14 August ===
List of shipwrecks: 14 August 1924
Ship	State	Description
Branstone	United Kingdom	The coaster collided with Merkara (United Kingdom) in the North Sea and off Flamborough Head, Yorkshire and sank. Her crew were rescued by Merkara.

=== 15 August ===
List of shipwrecks: 15 August 1924
Ship	State	Description
Kumiai Maru No.1	Japan	The cargo ship ran aground in the Hai River 60 nautical miles (110 km) upstream of the Taku Forts, Tianjin, China. She was refloated on 23 August.

=== 17 August ===
List of shipwrecks: 17 August 1924
Ship	State	Description
Elsdon	United Kingdom	The cargo ship ran aground on Middelgrunden, Öresund. She was refloated on 20 August.
Margarita	United Kingdom	The cargo ship ran aground in the Guadalquivir at Seville, Spain. She was refloated on 28 August.

=== 18 August ===
List of shipwrecks: 18 August 1924
Ship	State	Description
Maindy Keep	United Kingdom	The coaster foundered in the Bay of Biscay 30 nautical miles (56 km) north of Ouessant, Finistère, France (48°55′N 4°55′W). All sixteen crew were rescued by Olivia (United Kingdom).
Mjolner	Sweden	The cargo ship ran aground in the Baltic Sea near the Plevna Lightship (Sweden). She was refloated on 22 August.

=== 20 August ===
List of shipwrecks: 20 August 1924
Ship	State	Description
Point Hope	United Kingdom	The tug ran aground and sank at Broughton Island, Northwest Territory, Canada and sank.

=== 21 August ===
List of shipwrecks: 21 August 1924
Ship	State	Description
Mairo	Peru	The barque came ashore on Lobos de Tierra Island, Peru, and was abandoned as a total loss.

=== 22 August ===
List of shipwrecks: 22 August 1924
Ship	State	Description
Arctic	United States	The auxiliary schooner was crushed in ice 5 nautical miles (9.3 km) south of Cape Smyth, Balleny Islands, Antarctica. Her crew survived.

=== 23 August ===
List of shipwrecks: 23 August 1924
Ship	State	Description
Wooston	United Kingdom	The coaster sprang a leak and foundered 12 nautical miles (22 km) south east of Sanda Island, Argyllshire.

=== 26 August ===
List of shipwrecks: 26 August 1924
Ship	State	Description
Beaufort	United Kingdom	The dredger sprang a leak and sank at Aberdeen.
Helen E. Murley	United States	Hurricane No. 3: The fishing schooner sank in the hurricane, had been anchored off the Nantucket Lightship the night before. Lost with all six crew.
Rosalie	United Kingdom	The cargo ship stuck a submerged wreck in the Bristol Channel and was beached at Fishguard, Pembrokeshire.
Samuel W. Hathaway	United States	Hurricane No. 3: The schooner was abandoned in the Atlantic Ocean 150 nautical miles (280 km) northeast by east of Cape Hatteras, North Carolina. Six of her nine crew were rescued by Southern Cross (United Kingdom).
Wanderer	United States	Hurricane No. 3: The 116-foot (35 m), 303-gross register ton whaling bark dragged her anchor during a storm and was wrecked without loss of life on rocks just off the west shore of Cuttyhunk Island, Massachusetts. Her wreck settled in up to 20 feet (6.1 m) of water at (41°25′18″N 070°56′36″W).

=== 27 August ===
List of shipwrecks: 27 August 1924
Ship	State	Description
Espoir	France	The cargo ship was in collision with Miisaki Milli (Turkey) at Istanbul, Turkey and sank. Miisaki Milli was beached.

=== 28 August ===
List of shipwrecks: 28 August 1924
Ship	State	Description
Augusta	United States	The cargo ship was driven ashore at Vineyard Haven, Massachusetts. She was refloated on 2 September.
Axholm	United Kingdom	The cargo ship collided with Walter Watts (United Kingdom) at Warri, Nigeria and sank with some loss of life.

=== 29 August ===
List of shipwrecks: 29 August 1924
Ship	State	Description
Earl of Zetland	United Kingdom	The passenger ship ran aground at Lerwick, Shetland Islands. Her passengers were taken off by the fishing vessel Mizpah (United Kingdom). She was refloated on 3 September.

=== 31 August ===
List of shipwrecks: 31 August 1924
Ship	State	Description
Bardic	United Kingdom	The refrigerated cargo ship ran aground on The Stags, off Lizard Point, Cornwall. Her crew were taken off, but her officers later reboarded the ship. On 8 September, they were taken off by a lifeboat. Bardic was refloated on 29 September. She was towed to Falmouth, Cornwall and was beached.

=== Unknown date ===
List of shipwrecks: Unknown date 1924
Ship	State	Description
Lady Kindersley	Canada	The cargo ship became mired in ice in the Arctic Ocean off Point Barrow in early August. She was abandoned on 22 August, but her crew later returned to the ship as they were unable to reach land. By 21 August, she was 45 nautical miles (83 km) east of Point Barrow. She had sunk by 16 September.
P G #4	United States	With no one on board, the 8-ton scow was wrecked in Cook Inlet on the south-central coast of the Territory of Alaska.
Ripple	United Kingdom	The cargo ship foundered off Wellington, New Zealand in early August with the loss of all hands. Wreckage came ashore on 9 August.

== September ==
=== 1 September ===
List of shipwrecks: 1 September 1924
Ship	State	Description
Hongisto	Finland	The cargo ship came ashore at Lavernock Point, Glamorgan and was wrecked.
Maryse	Belgium	The schooner struck a submerged wreck 35 nautical miles (65 km) off Guernsey, Channel Islands and sank.

=== 2 September ===
List of shipwrecks: 2 September 1924
Ship	State	Description
Aki	Imperial Japanese Navy	Washington Naval Treaty: The decommissioned Satsuma-class battleship was sunk as a gunnery target by the battleship Hyūga and battlecruiser Kongō (both Imperial Japanese Navy) in Tokyo Bay.

=== 4 September ===
List of shipwrecks: 4 September 1924
Ship	State	Description
CPPC #1	United States	While under tow with a 10-ton cargo of salt, barrels, and equipment, the 22-ton scow was lost when her towline parted off a location identified as "Gord Point" or "Point Gord" – probably a reference to Gore Point (59°12′00″N 150°57′30″W) – on the coast of Afognak Island in the Territory of Alaska′s Kodiak Archipelago and she blew out to sea.

=== 5 September ===
List of shipwrecks: 5 September 1924
Ship	State	Description
Excelsior	United Kingdom	The steamship sprang a leak and quickly foundered 5 nautical miles (9.3 km) west of The Needles, Isle of Wight (Portsmouth, Hampshire for Newport, Wales, with scrap iron); the crew landed at Keyhaven.
Ray	United States	The 142-gross register ton scow was wrecked on Marmot Island in the Kodiak Archipelago.
Raymonde	France	The schooner broke free from her moorings at Saint-Pierre, Saint Pierre and Miquelon and came ashore at Fortune, Newfoundland where she was wrecked.

=== 6 September ===
List of shipwrecks: 6 September 1924
Ship	State	Description
Ettrick	United Kingdom	The cargo ship ran aground in the River Avon at Bristol. She was refloated on 25 October.

=== 7 September ===
List of shipwrecks: 7 September 1924
Ship	State	Description
Kalix	Sweden	The cargo ship ran aground between Redcar and Whitby, Yorkshire, United Kingdom She was refloated but was leaking and was beached in the River Tees at Middlesbrough.
Satsuma	Imperial Japanese Navy	Washington Naval Treaty: The decommissioned Satsuma-class battleship was sunk as a gunnery target by the battleships Nagato and Mutsu (both Imperial Japanese Navy) off the southern tip of the Bōsō Peninsula near the mouth of Tokyo Bay.

=== 9 September ===
List of shipwrecks: 9 September 1924
Ship	State	Description
Lettie	United States	Due to a navigational error, the 33-gross register ton motor vessel was wrecked 1.5 nautical miles (2.8 km; 1.7 mi) northeast of the mouth of Wainwright Inlet, Territory of Alaska, and about 1.5 nautical miles (2.8 km; 1.7 mi) off shore. Her crew of three survived.

=== 11 September ===
List of shipwrecks: 11 September 1924
Ship	State	Description
Dunrobin	United Kingdom	The cargo ship came ashore at Tunas de Zaza, Cuba. She was refloated on 14 September.

=== 12 September ===
List of shipwrecks: 12 September 1924
Ship	State	Description
P. J. Ralph	United States	The cargo ship was driven ashore on Manitou Island, Michigan and was wrecked.
Verita	Italy	The cargo ship ran aground at El Ejido, Andalusia, Spain and was a total loss. Her crew were rescued.
Wren	United Kingdom	The cargo ship came ashore 10 nautical miles (19 km) north of Davis Inlet, Newfoundland and was a total loss. Her crew were rescued.

=== 15 September ===
List of shipwrecks: 15 September 1924
Ship	State	Description
Mesna	Norway	The cargo ship came ashore at Nukuʻalofa, Tonga and was a total loss. Her crew survived.

=== 16 September ===
List of shipwrecks: 16 September 1924
Ship	State	Description
Mary Weems	United States	The cargo ship sank at Philadelphia, Pennsylvania whilst under repair.
Moyallon	United Kingdom	The coaster foundered in the Bristol Channel off Strumble Head, Pembrokeshire. All ten crew were rescued by Hampshire Coast (United Kingdom).

=== 17 September ===
List of shipwrecks: 17 September 1924
Ship	State	Description
Asian	United Kingdom	The cargo ship struck the Stag Rocks, off Galley Head, County Cork, Ireland and sank.
Isonzo	Italy	The cargo ship caught fire and sank in the Port Arthur Canal, Texas, United States.

=== 20 September ===
List of shipwrecks: 20 September 1924
Ship	State	Description
Ulf Jarl	Norway	The cargo ship struck a mine in the Gulf of Finland. Her crew were rescued.

=== 21 September ===
List of shipwrecks: 21 September 1924
Ship	State	Description
Annie	United Kingdom	The coaster put into Holyhead, Anglesey with a fractured main steam pipe. She was later driven ashore in Church Bay and was wrecked. All eight crew were rescued by rocket apparatus.

=== 22 September ===
List of shipwrecks: 22 September 1924
Ship	State	Description
Clifton	United States	The lake freighter foundered in a gale on Lake Huron off Forty Mile Point Light 25 nautical miles (46 km; 29 mi) off Thunder Bay during the night of 21–22 September with the loss of her entire crew of 25.
Ivor	United Kingdom	The tanker suffered an explosion and fire in her bunker coals. She was subsequently abandoned in the Atlantic Ocean off Cape Race, Newfoundland. Her crew were rescued by Lituania (Denmark).
Thistle	United Kingdom	The passenger ship put back into Heysham, Lancashire in a gale and became stranded on the north breakwater. Her passengers were transferred to Brier (United Kingdom). She was refloated on 25 September.

=== 23 September ===
List of shipwrecks: 23 September 1924
Ship	State	Description
Lotsiia	Soviet Navy	The Uragan-class monitor ran aground at Kronstadt. She was consequently scrapped.
Ugor	Soviet Navy	The Bars-class submarine flooded and sank at Kronstadt. Salvaged and scrapped.

=== 24 September ===
List of shipwrecks: 24 September 1924
Ship	State	Description
Edward Peirce	United States	The cargo ship collided with Mundelta (United States) at Boston, Massachusetts and sank. She was refloated on 4 October.
Yankee	United States	The 15-gross register ton, 41-foot (12 m) fishing vessel sank in Kasaan Bay (55°24′N 132°06′W) in Southeast Alaska. The only person on board survived.

=== 28 September ===
List of shipwrecks: 28 September 1924
Ship	State	Description
Courtown	United Kingdom	The cargo ship collided with La Rochefoucauld (France) in the Bristol Channel off Pendeen, Cornwall and sank. Her crew were rescued by La Rochefoucauld.
Guarany	Argentina	The cargo ship sank at her moorings at Buenos Aires.

=== 29 September ===
List of shipwrecks: 29 September 1924
Ship	State	Description
Shibaura Maru	Japan	The cargo ship ran aground in Kii Ōshima. She was refloated on 5 October.

=== 30 September ===
List of shipwrecks: 30 September 1924
Ship	State	Description
Anatolia	Germany	The cargo ship ran aground at Smyrna, Turkey. She was refloated on 4 October.
Kathleen Annie	United Kingdom	The auxiliary schooner came ashore in Greenholms Bay, Orkney Islands and was severely damaged. She was refloated on 2 October and beached on Egilsay.
Santa Theresa	United Kingdom	The cargo ship foundered in the Atlantic Ocean off Savannah, Georgia. All 34 crew were rescued by I. C. Whith (United Kingdom).
Trecarrell	United Kingdom	The cargo ship ran aground st Ras Hafun, Italian Somaliland. She was refloated on 3 October.

=== Unknown date ===
List of shipwrecks: Unknown date 1924
Ship	State	Description
Fridolf Gek	Soviet Union	The 26.98-gross register ton schooner was wrecked on the north bank of the Snake River at Nome, Territory of Alaska, after she dragged her anchor. Deemed a threat to navigation and an obstacle to the construction of new jetties, her wreck was refloated in August 1925 and deliberately grounded on a mud flat along the river's north bank, where it was abandoned.

== October ==
=== 1 October ===
List of shipwrecks: 1 October 1924
Ship	State	Description
Don Arturo	Chile	The coaster ran aground 10 nautical miles (19 km) north of Constitutión. She was a total loss.

=== 2 October ===
List of shipwrecks: 2 October 1924
Ship	State	Description
Clifton	United States	The cargo ship foundered.
Ringborg	United Kingdom	The cargo ship foundered in the Atlantic Ocean (approximately 34°N 75°W).
Taisho Maru	Japan	The cargo ship ran aground at Kanabuso. She broke in two and sank.
Thor	Germany	The cargo ship sprang a leak and sank in the Gulf of Finland 15 nautical miles (28 km) north of Osmussaar, Estonia.

=== 3 October ===
List of shipwrecks: 3 October 1924
Ship	State	Description
Else	United States	The four-masted schooner came ashore 20 nautical miles (37 km) east of Pensacola, Florida. Her crew were rescued. She was refloated on 13 October.

=== 4 October ===
List of shipwrecks: 4 October 1924
Ship	State	Description
Douglas H. Thomas	United Kingdom	The cargo ship sank at Ingonish, Nova Scotia, Canada.

=== 5 October ===
List of shipwrecks: 5 October 1924
Ship	State	Description
Yachiyo Maru	Japan	The cargo ship ran aground at Niigata. She was refloated on 28 October.

=== 7 October ===
List of shipwrecks: 7 October 1924
Ship	State	Description
Rosefield	Danzig	The cargo ship ran aground at the Bjuröklubb Lighthouse, Västerbotten, Sweden. She was refloated on 26 October.
Toyokawa Maru	Japan	The cargo ship was wrecked on the coast of Sakhalien.

=== 8 October ===
List of shipwrecks: 8 October 1924
Ship	State	Description
Rhin	France	The passenger ship came ashore at Point Conbre and was wrecked. All on board were rescued.

=== 9 October ===
List of shipwrecks: 9 October 1924
Ship	State	Description
Dolly Madison	United States	The cargo ship was abandoned in the Atlantic Ocean. Her crew were rescued by a tug.

=== 10 October ===
List of shipwrecks: 10 October 1924
Ship	State	Description
Matador	United Kingdom	The cargo ship sprang a leak in the North Sea and was abandoned 3 nautical miles (5.6 km) off Stonehaven, Aberdeenshire.
Waki Maru	Japan	The cargo ship sank off Shiriya.

=== 11 October ===
List of shipwrecks: 11 October 1924
Ship	State	Description
Fanny Maria	United Kingdom	The Thames barge was in collision with Western Coast (United Kingdom) and sank in the River Thames at Rotherhithe, London.
H. L. Montague	United Kingdom	The schooner was driven ashore at Herring Neck, Newfoundland and was a total loss.

=== 12 October ===
List of shipwrecks: 12 October 1924
Ship	State	Description
Cora	United States	The 13-gross register ton motor vessel caught fire at Point Ward Cannery in Southeast Alaska when her gasoline engine backfired. She burned to the waterline before the fire was extinguished. Her crew of three survived. The motor vessel Monoghan (United States) later towed her wreck to a lagoon at Anan Creek (56.179561°N 131.885156°W) and beached it there.

=== 13 October ===
List of shipwrecks: 13 October 1924
Ship	State	Description
Flackwell	United Kingdom	The cargo ship ran aground 12 nautical miles (22 km) from the Manora Breakwater Lighthouse, near Karachi, India. She was refloated on 22 October.
Ciudad de Cadiz	Spain	The cargo ship was wrecked at Fernando Po, Spanish Guinea.

=== 16 October ===
List of shipwrecks: 16 October 1924
Ship	State	Description
Benten Maru	Japan	The cargo ship came ashore on the east coast of Sakhalin. She was refloated on 1 November.
Caprera	Italy	The tanker caught fire at Tripoli, Libya and was a total loss.

=== 18 October ===
List of shipwrecks: 18 October 1924
Ship	State	Description
Bellhill	United Kingdom	The cargo ship struck a submerged object and was holed. She was beached at Gedser, Denmark.
Orion	Sweden	The cargo ship capsized and sank in the North Sea 10 nautical miles (19 km) south west of Lindesnes, Norway. Her crew survived.

=== 19 October ===
List of shipwrecks: 19 October 1924
Ship	State	Description
James Timpson	United States	The cargo ship was abandoned in the Gulf of Mexico (approximately 16°N 86°W).
Triton	Denmark	The schooner foundered in the Atlantic Ocean (49°19′N 7°29′W). Her crew were rescued by Rhexenor (United Kingdom).

=== 22 October ===
List of shipwrecks: 21 October 1924
Ship	State	Description
Clansman	United Kingdom	The coaster foundered in the North Sea off the Haisborough Sands, Norfolk. All nine crew were rescued by the Cromer Lifeboat.

=== 23 October ===
List of shipwrecks: 23 October 1924
Ship	State	Description
Port Nicholson	United Kingdom	The cargo ship struck rocks at Isleta Point, Las Palmas, Canary Islands, Spain and was beached off the Port of Las Palmas. She was refloated on 6 November.

=== 24 October ===
List of shipwrecks: 24 October 1924
Ship	State	Description
Fylgia	Sweden	The cargo ship foundered in the Baltic Sea off Örskär with the loss of all hands.
Valdarno	Italy	The cargo ship was destroyed by fire at Panama City, Florida, United States.

=== 26 October ===
List of shipwrecks: 26 October 1924
Ship	State	Description
Vizma	Soviet Union	The brig foundered in the Atlantic Ocean 50 nautical miles (93 km) off Vigo, Galicia, Spain. Her crew survived.

=== 28 October ===
List of shipwrecks: 28 October 1924
Ship	State	Description
Floris	United Kingdom	The cargo ship ran aground on the Trupailles Rock off the Île d'Yeu, Vendée and was wrecked. Her crew were rescued.
Kansas	United States	The cargo ship was destroyed by fire and sank in Lake Michigan.

=== 29 October ===
List of shipwrecks: 29 October 1924
Ship	State	Description
"Anida"	United Kingdom	The 128.9-foot (39.3 m), 270-ton steam trawler was wrecked in heavy seas on Frenchman's Rock, Portnahaven, in Islay Sound, Inner Hebrides, Scotland. Three crew got into her boat, but the other 9 crewmen were washed overboard and died before they could get in, the boat made it to shore.
Silver Wave	United States	Carrying five passengers, a crew of four, and a cargo of 12 tons of general merchandise, the 32-gross register ton, 54.8-foot (16.7 m) motor schooner became frozen in ice in Kotzebue Sound about 8 nautical miles (15 km; 9.2 mi) off the coast of the Territory of Alaska and about 12 nautical miles (22 km; 14 mi) from Cape Espenberg and was abandoned without loss of life, becoming a total loss.

=== 30 October ===
List of shipwrecks: 30 October 1924
Ship	State	Description
Alden Anderson	United States	The tanker was destroyed by fire at Avon, California.
Crow	United Kingdom	The Thames barge capsized and sank in the River Thames at Gravesend, Kent with the loss of one of her two crew.
Erle	Norway	The cargo ship ran aground at Gedser, Zealand, Denmark. She was refloated on 3 November.
Glenorchy	United Kingdom	The cargo ship collided with Leonard B. Miller (United States) in Lake Huron and sank.
H.R.A.	United Kingdom	The Thames barge sank in the Thames Estuary off Erith, Kent. Her crew were rescued. She was refloated on 1 November.
Kalevi Poeg	Estonia	The passenger ship ran aground at Hankö, Finland. All on board were rescued.

=== 31 October ===
List of shipwrecks: 31 October 1924
Ship	State	Description
Arion	Italy	The cargo ship collided with Borneo (Netherlands) in the Tyrrhenian Sea and sank with the loss of a crew member.
Jamaica	Nicaragua	The cargo ship caught fire at Bluefields and was a total loss.

== November ==
=== 1 November ===
List of shipwrecks: 1 November 1924
Ship	State	Description
Glenlyon	United Kingdom	The cargo ship ran aground in Lake Superior off Isle Royale, Michigan. She broke in two on 4 December. Glenlyon later sank. All crew were rescued.

=== 3 November ===
List of shipwrecks: 3 November 1924
Ship	State	Description
Maule	Chile	The coaster ran aground in the Chacao Canal. She was declared a total loss.
Waif	United States	After departing Cordova, Territory of Alaska, and picking up coal from Shinkoku Maru (Japan), the 25-gross register ton, 56-foot (17 m) motor vessel was returning to Cordova when she struck rocks off Salmo Point (60°37′N 145°46′W) in Cordova Bay and foundered. Her hull later was reported to be decaying on the beach, a total loss.

=== 4 November ===
List of shipwrecks: 4 November 1924
Ship	State	Description
E. D. Bailley	United Kingdom	The schooner sprang a leak and foundered in the Atlantic Ocean (26°00′N 74°55′W). All six crew were rescued by Boverton (United Kingdom).
Inspiration	United Kingdom	The schooner was abandoned in the Atlantic Ocean (38°52′N 31°49′W). All seven crew were rescued by Cardiganshire (United Kingdom).
Terneskjær	Norway	The cargo ship was driven ashore on the south coast of Iceland and was wrecked.

=== 5 November ===
List of shipwrecks: 5 November 1924
Ship	State	Description
Niko	United States	The cargo ship foundered off Garden Island, Lake Michigan. Her crew survived.

=== 6 November ===
List of shipwrecks: 6 November 1924
Ship	State	Description
Graham	United Kingdom	The whaler was reported off the South Shetland Islands. No further trace, presumed foundered with the loss of all hands.

=== 7 November ===
List of shipwrecks: 7 November 1924
Ship	State	Description
Marie Margaretha	Denmark	The auxiliary sailing vessel was in collision with the minelayer HMS Princess Margaret (Royal Navy) in the English Channel 10 nautical miles (19 km) off the Owers Lightship (United Kingdom) and sank. Her twelve crew were rescued by Princess Margaret.

=== 8 November ===
List of shipwrecks: 8 November 1924
Ship	State	Description
Alerte	Belgium	The tug collided with Marquise de Lubersac (France) in the Scheldt and sank.

=== 10 November ===
List of shipwrecks: 10 November 1924
Ship	State	Description
Mars	United States	The cargo ship was wrecked in a cyclone at Daiquirí, Cuba.
Zacapa	United States	The refrigerated cargo liner ran aground on Great Inagua, Bahamas. Her passengers were taken off by Teno (United States).

=== 11 November ===
List of shipwrecks: 11 November 1924
Ship	State	Description
David Morris	United Kingdom	The schooner was driven ashore on Grand Turk and was a total loss. Her crew survived.
Boz Kourd	Turkey	The cargo ship collided with Gul Nihal (Turkey) off San Stefano and was beached.

=== 12 November ===
List of shipwrecks: 12 November 1924
Ship	State	Description
Enrico Toti	Italy	The cargo ship ran aground in the Patapsco River at Baltimore, Maryland, United States. She was refloated on 18 November.

=== 14 November ===
List of shipwrecks: 14 November 1924
Ship	State	Description
Pierre	Belgium	The tug capsized at Antwerp, Belgium.
Sesnon #23	United States	While anchored in the roadstead at Nome, Territory of Alaska, 2 nautical miles (3.7 km; 2.3 mi) west of the mouth of the Snake River with no cargo or crew aboard, the 39-ton barge broke loose from her moorings during a gale, was driven ashore, and was broken apart by waves.

=== 17 November ===
List of shipwrecks: 17 November 1924
Ship	State	Description
Canestio	United States	The barge sank in a gale after the tug Kingfisher's (United States) steering became disabled between New York City and Rockland, Maine. Her crew were rescued by USCGC Ossipee ( United States Coast Guard), but her Master died on the Cutter.
Daigo Maru	Japan	The cargo ship ran aground at Nekogashira, Hokkaidō. She was wrecked in a storm on 25 November and sank.
Edgar Baxter	United States	The tug burned at Tremely Point, New Jersey.
Pohatcong	United States	The barge sank in a gale after her tug Kingfisher's (United States) steering became disabled between New York City and Rockland, Maine. Her crew abandoned ship in a lifeboat, but were lost.
Strafford	United States	The barge sank in a gale after her tug Kingfisher's (United States) steering became disabled between New York City and Rockland, Maine. Her crew was rescued by Kingfisher.

=== 19 November ===
List of shipwrecks: 19 November 1924
Ship	State	Description
Andrieta	Spain	The cargo ship sprang a leak at San Juan de Nieva and sank.
Maresfield	United Kingdom	The cargo ship ran aground at Trois-Rivières, Quebec, Canada. She was refloated on 23 November.
Princesse Clémentine	Belgium	The cargo ship was wrecked on Penny Steel Rocks, Staithes Nab, Yorkshire, United Kingdom.

=== 20 November ===
List of shipwrecks: 20 November 1924
Ship	State	Description
Belgenland	Belgium	The ocean liner ran aground in the Scheldt at Doel. She was refloated later that day.

=== 22 November ===
List of shipwrecks: 22 November 1924
Ship	State	Description
Falernian	United Kingdom	The cargo ship ran aground near Constanţa, Romania (44°05′N 28°45′E). She was refloated on 4 March 1925.

=== 23 November ===
List of shipwrecks: 23 November 1924
Ship	State	Description
Lucia Briaco	Italy	The cargo ship foundered 20 nautical miles (37 km) off Capo Colonna, Calabria. Her crew survived.

=== 24 November ===
List of shipwrecks: 24 November 1924
Ship	State	Description
Esperanza	United States	The cargo ship was driven ashore at Tampico, Tamaulipas, Mexico. She was declared a total loss on 3 December.
Marguerite M. Wemyss	United States	The four-masted schooner was abandoned in the Atlantic Ocean off Cape Hatteras, North Carolina. Her crew were rescued by the battleship USS Utah (United States Navy).
Perry Setzer	United States	The four-masted schooner collided with City of Montgomery (United States) off the Diamond Shoals with the loss of her captain and was abandoned. Survivors were rescued by Solana (United States).
Strombus	United Kingdom	The cargo ship was driven ashore at Tampico, Tamaulipas, Mexico. She was refloated on 27 November.

=== 25 November ===
List of shipwrecks: 25 November 1924
Ship	State	Description
Heiyei Maru No.3	Japan	The cargo ship collided with Hokoyo Maru (Japan) in the Kurushima Channel and sank.
USS Washington	United States	Washington sinking. Washington Naval Treaty: The incomplete Colorado-class battleship was sunk as a target off the Virginia Capes by the battleships USS New York and USS Texas (both United States Navy).
Wild Rover	United Kingdom	The schooner was wrecked on Union Island, Saint Vincent.

=== 26 November ===
List of shipwrecks: 26 November 1924
Ship	State	Description
Daleside	United Kingdom	The cargo ship departed Guernsey, Channel Islands for Harwich, Essex. Presumed later foundered in the English Channel with the loss of all hands. A lifeboat from the ship washed up at Pagham, Sussex on 3 December.
Lina K	United States	While laid up and with no one on board, the 10-gross register ton motor vessel was destroyed by fire at Aiaktalik Island (56°42′N 154°03′W) in the Kodiak Archipelago in the Territory of Alaska.

=== 27 November ===
List of shipwrecks: 27 November 1924
Ship	State	Description
Dieppe	United Kingdom	The steam passenger ferry struck the breakwater in the harbor at Newhaven, Sussex, stern-first. The tugs Alert and Richmere (both United Kingdom) came to her assistance, but Richmere was disabled, dashed against the harbor wall, and sunk. Dieppe docked five hours later. She was repaired and returned to service.
Hartley	United Kingdom	The cargo ship foundered in the English Channel off Anvil Point, Swanage, Dorset with the loss of seventeen of her nineteen crew. Survivors were rescued by Machaon (United Kingdom).
Richmere	United Kingdom	The tug was disabled when a cable became entangled around her propeller while she was coming to the assistance of the steam passenger ferry Dieppe (United Kingdom), which had struck the breakwater in the harbor at Newhaven, Sussex. Richmere was dashed against the harbor wall, and sank. Her crew was rescued by the Newhaven Lifeboat Sir Fitzroy Clayton ( Royal National Lifeboat Institution). Richmere later was refloated, repaired, and returned to service.
Rupavati	United Kingdom	The passenger ship struck rocks off Vengurla, India and was beached at Malwan. Her passengers were landed.

=== 28 November ===
List of shipwrecks: 28 November 1924
Ship	State	Description
Cornish Coast		The steamer stranded on the Seven Stones Reef between Cornwall and the Isles of Scilly. She survived and was involved in an incident with the sinking of the steamer Fagerness off Trevose Head on 17 March 1926.
Gyptis	Belgium	The cargo ship ran aground at Pointe la Coubre, Gironde Estuary, France due to the failure of her engine and was wrecked.

=== 29 November ===
List of shipwrecks: 29 November 1924
Ship	State	Description
Alexandre	Belgium	The cargo ship collided with Canadian Pioneer (United Kingdom) in the North Sea off Vlissingen, Netherlands and was beached.
Astero	Italy	The cargo ship came ashore at Ras el Amar, Tunisia. Her crew were rescued by Belos (Sweden). She was refloated on 3 December.
Baltic	Denmark	The cargo ship collided with Frost (Sweden) in the Øresund off the Trindelon Lightship (Sweden) and sank with the loss of two crew. Survivors were rescued by Frost.
Enrico Toti	Italy	The cargo ship sprang a leak and was abandoned in the Atlantic Ocean (37°29′N 55°09′W). Her crew were rescued by Miami (United Kingdom).
Sveadrott	Sweden	The cargo ship ran aground at Kungshamn, Västra Götaland County. She broke in two on 14 December.
HMS Vernon II	Royal Navy	The first-rate ship of the line broke in two during a gale and sank in the English Channel off Selsey Bill, Sussex with the loss of four of her seven crew. She was under tow to be scrapped.

=== 30 November ===
List of shipwrecks: 30 November 1924
Ship	State	Description
Öresund	Sweden	The cargo ship came ashore 16 nautical miles (30 km) north of the Bovbjerg Lighthouse, Denmark. She was refloated on 3 December.
Valborg	Soviet Union	The schooner came ashore 16 nautical miles (30 km) north of the Bovbjerg Lighthouse. She was refloated on 11 December.

=== Unknown date ===
List of shipwrecks: Unknown date November 1924
Ship	State	Description
New England	United States	Sometime after leaving Latouche Island on 20 November, the 29-gross register ton, 52.3-foot (15.9 m) fishing vessel was lost when her crew of six was forced to abandon ship in the Gulf of Alaska 6 nautical miles (11 km; 6.9 mi) from Cape Saint Elias, Territory of Alaska, after she lost her propeller.

== December ==
=== 1 December ===
List of shipwrecks: 1 December 1924
Ship	State	Description
Unity	United Kingdom	The Thames barge collided with San Dario (United Kingdom) in the River Thames at Shellhaven, Essex and sank.

=== 2 December ===
List of shipwrecks: 2 December 1924
Ship	State	Description
Freedom	United Kingdom	The schooner foundered in the Atlantic Ocean 600 nautical miles (1,100 km) off Sydney, Nova Scotia, Canada.
Taormina	Norway	The cargo ship ran aground at Österngarn, Sweden. She was refloated on 9 December.

=== 3 December ===
List of shipwrecks: 3 December 1924
Ship	State	Description
Lakeland	United States	The cargo ship foundered in Lake Michigan. Her crew were rescued.
Port Caledonia	Finland	The four-masted barque was driven ashore at Pointe de Chassiron, Île d'Oléron, Charente-Maritime, France and was wrecked with the loss of all hands.

=== 4 December ===
List of shipwrecks: 4 December 1924
Ship	State	Description
Falcon	United Kingdom	The sailing ship was wrecked on Easter Island.

=== 5 December ===
List of shipwrecks: 5 December 1924
Ship	State	Description
Begona No.2	Spain	The cargo ship ran aground near Ghar al Milh, Tunisia. She was refloated on 8 December.
Cigale	France	The coaster caught fire and foundered in the Indian Ocean on a voyage between Mauritius and Réunion. She was abandoned with the loss of 19 of the 47 people on board. Some of the survivors were rescued by Secunder (Mauritius) and Ville de Havre (France).
Siri	Sweden	The cargo ship was destroyed by fire in the Kattegat. Her crew were rescued.

=== 6 December ===
List of shipwrecks: 6 December 1924
Ship	State	Description
River Tyne	United Kingdom	The cargo ship ran aground at Helsingør, Zealand, Denmark. She was refloated on 9 December.

=== 8 December ===
List of shipwrecks: 8 December 1924
Ship	State	Description
A. Woodall	United States	The freighter burned in Chesapeake Bay. Lost with all seven hands.
Emma and Esther	United Kingdom	The schooner came ashore at Bonnybefore, County Antrim. She was refloated on 12 December.
Tana	Sweden	The barque collided with the fishing vessel Ibis (Sweden) off Skagen, Denmark and sank with the loss of seven crew. Survivors were rescued by Ibis.

=== 9 December ===
List of shipwrecks: 9 December 1924
Ship	State	Description
Oaxaca	Mexico	The cargo ship caught fire at sea and was beached at Mazatlán. She was refloated the next day.

=== 10 December ===
List of shipwrecks: 10 December 1924
Ship	State	Description
Esther Hankinson	United Kingdom	The schooner was abandoned in the Atlantic Ocean (approximately 30°N 20°W) with the loss of a crew member. Survivors were rescued by Charalambos (Greece).
Folkvard	Norway	The cargo ship ran aground at Læsø, Denmark. She was refloated but subsequently beached. Folkvard was refloated again on 11 December.
Noas	Latvia	The sailing ship foundered in the Baltic Sea off Karlshamn, Blekinge County, Sweden with the loss of a crew member.

=== 11 December ===
List of shipwrecks: 11 December 1924
Ship	State	Description
Bras d'Or	United Kingdom	The cargo ship was destroyed by fire at Port Hawkesbury, Nova Scotia, Canada.
Fuki Maru	Japan	The cargo ship caught fire 5 nautical miles (9.3 km) south of Namoa Island, Samoa (23°19′N 117°00′E) and was abandoned.
Pelleen	United Kingdom	The schooner sprang a leak and was beached at Saint-Pierre, Saint Pierre and Miquelon.

=== 12 December ===
List of shipwrecks: 12 December 1924
Ship	State	Description
USS Castine	United States Navy	The decommissioned gunboat was in the Gulf of Mexico under tow to a Texas scrapyard when she suffered an explosion that sank her in 20 minutes

=== 13 December ===
List of shipwrecks: 13 December 1924
Ship	State	Description
Laura	Italy	The cargo ship collided with Lorenzo (United Kingdom) in the English Channel off Dunkirk, Nord, France and sank with the loss of a crew member.
Mikado Maru	Japan	The cargo ship ran aground at Shimonoseki. She was refloated on 18 December.

=== 15 December ===
List of shipwrecks: 15 December 1924
Ship	State	Description
Barnouic	France	The auxiliary schooner came ashore on the Île de Ré, Charente-Maritime. Her crew were rescued.
Mapledawn	United Kingdom	The cargo ship ran aground in Georgian Bay, Ontario, Canada. She was abandoned as a total loss.

=== 16 December ===
List of shipwrecks: 16 December 1924
Ship	State	Description
Grand Turk	United States	The three-masted schooner was driven ashore 180 nautical miles (330 km) east of Progreso, Yucatán and was wrecked. Her crew survived.

=== 17 December ===
List of shipwrecks: 17 December 1924
Ship	State	Description
Fiume	Italy	The cargo ship ran aground at Point Indio, Argentina. She was refloated on 20 December.
Promus	United Kingdom	The cargo ship ran aground in the Nieuwe Deep. She was refloated on 23 December.

=== 18 December ===
List of shipwrecks: 18 December 1924
Ship	State	Description
Eglantiër	Belgium	The cargo ship ran aground in the Paraná River, Argentina. She was refloated on 22 December.
Millville	United States	The 22-gross register ton motor vessel was destroyed by fire while laid up for the winter with no one aboard at Pybus Bay (57°16′N 134°05′W) in Southeast Alaska.

=== 19 December ===
List of shipwrecks: 19 December 1924
Ship	State	Description
Tornan	Sweden	The cargo ship came ashore at Torekov, Sweden and was abandoned by her crew.

=== 20 December ===
List of shipwrecks: 20 December 1924
Ship	State	Description
Thames	United Kingdom	The brig sprang a leak in the Atlantic Ocean. She was abandoned on 23 December (48°50′N 12°04′W). All seven crew were rescued by Springfield (United Kingdom).

=== 21 December ===
List of shipwrecks: 21 December 1924
Ship	State	Description
Cascade	United Kingdom	The coaster sank at Brentwood Bay, British Columbia, Canada.
Vard	Norway	The cargo ship sprang a leak and foundered in the North Sea off Dunnet Head, Caithness, United Kingdom. All fifteen crew were rescued by the trawler Lord Knaresborough (United Kingdom).

=== 22 December ===
List of shipwrecks: 22 December 1924
Ship	State	Description
Chingford	United Kingdom	The cargo ship was driven ashore at Crail, Fife. Her 27 crew were rescued by rocket apparats and the Anstruther and St. Andrews Lifeboats.
Claremorris	United Kingdom	The cargo ship was driven ashore at Corsewall Point, Wigtownshire with the loss of one of her eleven crew. She was a total loss.
Esther Maria	Denmark	The cargo ship was driven aground on the Big Rock, Stornoway, Isle of Lewis. All crew except her officers were taken off. She was refloated on 8 February 1925.
Katherine	United Kingdom	The cargo ship ran aground at Dundrum, Dublin, Ireland. She was driven further up the shore on 27 December. She was refloated on 9 May 1925.
Konini	United Kingdom	The cargo ship ran aground at Whale Point, South Island, New Zealand and was a total loss.
Ostrobotnia	Finland	The cargo ship struck rocks at Viborg, Denmark and was beached. She was refloated later that day.
Vithinia	Greece	The cargo ship ran aground and sank at Laurium.

=== 23 December ===
List of shipwrecks: 23 December 1924
Ship	State	Description
Themis	Sweden	The cargo ship ran aground north of Bergen, Norway. She was refloated on 27 December.

=== 24 December ===
List of shipwrecks: 24 December 1924
Ship	State	Description
Anna Vasilakis	Greece	The cargo ship ran aground at Karaburun, Turkey. She was refloated on 29 December.
Po	Italy	The cargo ship collided with the steamer St. Paul (France) off Ventimiglia, Liguria and sank with the loss of two crew.
Scotsman	United Kingdom	The Thames barge collided with London Mariner (United Kingdom) in the River Thames and sank.
St.Karadec	France	The coaster ran aground and foundered in Carmarthen Bay with the loss of all hands.

=== 25 December ===
List of shipwrecks: 25 December 1924
Ship	State	Description
Marjorie Seed	United Kingdom	The cargo ship ran aground on Lady Isle in the Firth of Clyde. She was a total wreck by 28 December.
Meteore	France	The sailing ship foundered in the English Channel off Perros, Côtes-du-Nord.

=== 26 December ===
List of shipwrecks: 26 December 1924
Ship	State	Description
John Harrison	United Kingdom	The collier departed the River Tyne for Amsterdam, North Holland, Netherlands. Presumed foundered in the North Sea with the loss of all hands. A lifeboat from the ship washed up on Wyk auf Föhr, Schleswig-Holstein, Germany on 10 January 1925.

=== 27 December ===
List of shipwrecks: 27 December 1924
Ship	State	Description
Curlew	United Kingdom	The cargo ship sank off Louisburg, Nova Scotia, Canada.
Mount Blairy	Denmark	The three-masted schooner ran aground at Toward Point, Argyllshire, United Kingdom. She was refloated on 29 January 1925.
Glenaster	United Kingdom	The cargo ship ran aground at Cape St. Paul, Gold Coast. She was refloated on 5 January 1925.
Gleneden	United Kingdom	The cargo ship ran aground in the North Sea off Winterton, Norfolk. She was refloated and later beached at Sunk Island, Yorkshire. Gleneden was refloated on 31 December and taken to Immingham, Lincolnshire.
Sortland	Norway	The coaster was wrecked in Foldenfjord, Norway, with the loss of a crew member.
Willemoes	United Kingdom	The three-masted schooner came ashore at Freshwater West, Pembrokeshire and was wrecked with the loss of one of her six crew.

=== 28 December ===
List of shipwrecks: 28 December 1924
Ship	State	Description
Atlantic	Sweden	The cargo ship was abandoned in the North Sea off the Sunk Lightship (United Kingdom). Her fourteen crew were rescued by Panaghi Vagliano (Greece) and the Walton Lifeboat. She was later towed into Harwich, Essex and beached.
Clyde	United Kingdom	The cargo ship caught fire in the North Sea off Kinnaird Head, Aberdeenshire and was beached at Cairnbulg. She was a total loss but her crew were rescued.

=== 29 December ===
List of shipwrecks: 29 December 1924
Ship	State	Description
Alfredo	Spain	The collier foundered in the Bay of Biscay off Ouessant, Finistère, France with the loss of six of her nineteen crew.
Inger Benedicte	Norway	The cargo ship was rammed and sunk by the trawler Skallagrimur (Iceland) at Reykjavík, Iceland. Her crew were rescued.

=== 30 December ===
List of shipwrecks: 30 December 1924
Ship	State	Description
Stella Maris	United Kingdom	The cargo ship was wrecked at Amroth, Pembrokeshire.

=== 31 December ===
List of shipwrecks: 31 December 1924
Ship	State	Description
Eddystone		The Thames barge collided with Belvedere (United Kingdom) in the River Thames at Rainham, Essex and sank. Her crew were rescued.
Erivan	Norway	The whaler struck rocks and sank 15 nautical miles (28 km) off Swain Island, Kerguelen. Her crew were rescued by Kilfenora (United Kingdom).
Western Valleys	United Kingdom	The cargo ship came ashore at Heysham, Lancashire. She broke in two and was a total loss.

== Unknown date ==
List of shipwrecks: Unknown date 1924
Ship	State	Description
Arrow	United States	The 63.2-foot (19.3 m), 31-gross register ton two-masted schooner was abandoned in Detroit Harbor on the southern end of Wisconsin′s Washington Island sometime in 1924. She subsequently deteriorated into a wreck in the vicinity of 45°20.356′N 086°55.310′W.
Bolcom No. 8	United States	The 63-ton barge was wrecked at "Bluff Point" on the coast of the Territory of Alaska. The wreck report does not specify at which of many locations of the name the wreck took place.
President Coaker	United Kingdom	The schooner foundered in the Atlantic Ocean sometime in late January or early February. Wreckage washed up at Cape Ballard, Newfoundland on 2 February.
Laura	United States	The 8-gross register ton fishing vessel was stranded during a gale in Southeast Alaska at a place reported as "Walton Rocks, on Black Island," probably a reference to Waldon Rocks (55°16′15″N 131°36′20″W) opposite Blank Island (55.2731°N 131.6428°W). A small boat rescued the only person aboard.
Sesnon #4	United States	The barge was lost at Bluff, Territory of Alaska, in 1921 or 1924.
