= SS President Taft =

American ship

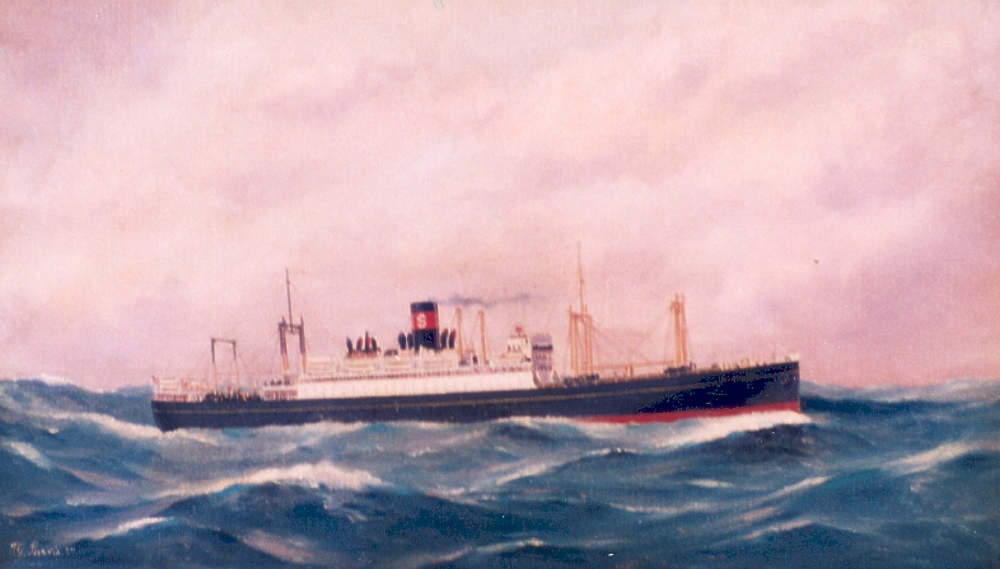
- The ship as President Taft, 1927

History
- Name: Buckeye State (1920–22); President Taft (1922–41); Willard A. Holbrook (1941–47)
- Namesake: Nickname for Ohio (1920–22); William Howard Taft (1922–41); Willard Ames Holbrook (1941–47)
- Owner: US Shipping Board (1921–22); Pacific Mail Steamship Co (1922–25); Dollar Steamship (1925–1938); American President Lines (1938–41); War Dept. (Army) (1941–1947)
- Operator: Matson (1921–22); Pacific Mail Steamship Co (1922–25); Dollar Steamship (1925–38); American President Lines (1938–41); United States Army (1941–47)
- Port of registry: San Francisco
- Builder: Bethlehem Steel Company, Sparrows Point
- Yard number: 4181
- Laid down: as Bertice
- Launched: 24 July 1920
- Sponsored by: Mrs HB Miller
- Completed: April 1921 as Buckeye State
- Identification: US official number 221233; code letters MCSG (until 1933); call sign KDRW (from 1934)
- Fate: Sold for scrapping 21 October 1957

General characteristics
- Class & type: USSB Design 1029, "535"
- Tonnage: 14,123 GRT; 13,000 DWT
- Length: 535 ft (163.1 m) LOA; 517.1 ft (157.6 m) BP
- Beam: 72 ft (21.9 m); 72.2 ft (22.0 m)
- Depth: 27.8 ft (8.5 m)
- Decks: 4
- Speed: 17.5 knots (32.4 km/h)
- Capacity: 256 first and 320 third class passengers
- Crew: 209

SS President Taft was a cargo passenger ship that was launched as one of the "state" ships, Buckeye State, completed by the United States Shipping Board as cargo passenger ships after originally being laid down as troop transports. Buckeye State had been laid down as Bertrice but was converted and renamed before launching. Originally assigned to the Matson Navigation Company as the Shipping Board's agent, the ship was later renamed President Taft and assigned to Pacific Mail Steamship Company for operation. In 1925 the Shipping Board sold the ship to Dollar Steamship Company. President Taft was operated by Dollar and then its successor American President Lines until requisitioned by the War Department on 17 June 1941.

President Taft was renamed and operated as USAT Willard A. Holbrook throughout World War II. In the closing days of the war the ship was undergoing conversion to an Army hospital ship with the proposed name of Armin W. Leuschner but the conversion was suspended in August 1945 and the name Willard A. Holbrook maintained. The reconversion into a troop transport was modified to one suitable for transporting dependents with the ship then transporting dependents from Europe post war.

== Construction and design ==
The ship was laid down as a Design 1029, later known in the trade as 535's for their overall length, troop ship at Bethlehem Steel Company's Sparrows Point, Maryland yard with the prospective name Bertrice for the United States Shipping Board (USSB). In 1919 the ship was renamed Buckeye State and, due to peace and the fact construction had not progressed too far for change, converted while under construction to a passenger liner. Buckeye State was launched on 24 July 1920, sponsored by Mrs HB Miller, wife of Assistant Manager of Construction, Emergency Fleet Corporation, Philadelphia.

By May 1926 Dollar was acquiring, over opposition, ten 535s from the USSB. Opponents cited the low price paid for the ships, as well as opposition based on a single company controlling so much Pacific shipping, but the price was the result of the ships being of a design not being the best for commercial operation.

== USSB/Matson liner Buckeye State ==
Buckeye State, with sister ship Hawkeye State, was assigned to Matson Navigation Company for operation on a rental basis of $140,000 per month. The ships were to be engaged in a route from Baltimore via Havana and the Panama Canal to San Francisco taking fourteen to fifteen days and then on the regular six-day Matson route to Honolulu. The entire round trip cycle for each ship was to be seventy days with the two ships maintaining a thirty-five-day sailing schedule. Buckeye State was severely damaged by fire in June 1921 with a repair contract let to Standard Shipbuilding, Shooters Island, New York for $19,000.

== President Taft ==
The Shipping Board renamed its "state" liners for United States presidents with a revised listing in May 1922, changing a number of names that had just been issued so that several ships had three names within as many months, with Buckeye State being renamed President Taft. Considerable confusion was caused due to an initial list with different names; for example, with United States Lines Lone Star State being first renamed President Taft and then within weeks changed again to President Harding. (Note: Previous lists had shown Buckeye State becoming President Roosevelt. There is some indication in journals, including earlier issues of the cited Nautical Gazette (May 13, 1922, page 591), that during the period between original and revised lists ships were reported operating under names that were revised.)

=== Pacific Mail Steamship Company operation ===
President Taft was allocated to the Pacific Mail Steamship Company in August 1922 to begin operation in September out of San Francisco. The USSB, citing "faulty construction," undertook refurbishment of twenty-three of the 535s including President Taft which was to have a boiler and engine overhaul at Moore Drydock Company, Oakland, California. The ship's interior decor, including furniture, draperies and upholstery was refurbished or replaced. Along with a number of other 535s the ship's refrigerated cargo space was increased by approximately 17,000 cubic feet (481.4 m^{3}) to 21,000 cubic feet (594.7 m^{3}). In addition to refurbishment President Taft was "fitted with the maximum of oriental steerage."

President Taft and four sister ships, President Cleveland, President Lincoln, President Pierce and President Wilson, began service from San Francisco to Honolulu, then Yokohama and Kobe, Japan, Shanghai and Hong Kong, China and Manila, Philippines with sailings every two weeks under the slogan "Sunshine Belt To The Orient". From 6 March to 8 July 1924 the ship was overhauled at the Mare Island Navy Yard at a cost of about $400,000. After reconditioning with Coen burners for the boilers the ship reduced fuel consumption on the San Francisco—Honolulu run from an average of about 5,000 barrels (794.9 m^{3}) to 3,272 barrels (520.2 m^{3}). In 1924, off the coast of Japan, President Taft rescued forty from the British tramp steamer Mary Harlock of which twenty reached safety in their own boat and another twenty, too weak to make that trip, were rescued by crew from the President Taft.

By January 1925 ten "President" liners were being operated by two companies as agents for USSB with five by the Admiral Oriental Line operating as the American Oriental Mail Line and the five, including President Taft, being operated by Pacific Mail under the name of California Orient Line.

=== Dollar Steamship Company & American President Lines ownership ===
By May the five Pacific Mail ships were being sold by the USSB to the Dollar Steamship Line for a total of $5,625,000 with each ship selling for $1,125,000. In a meeting following the sale of the five trans Pacific ships Pacific Mail Steamship Company stockholders voted to accept the offer of the W. R. Grace and Company for its remaining ships and goodwill. Dollar acquired all ten of the "President" liners operated by the two companies by mid 1926.

Dollar placed President Taft on its trans Pacific service and added Los Angeles to the ports visited on return voyages before arrival back at San Francisco in 1927. Captain M. C. Cochrane, 35, died aboard on 9 September 1927 after a sudden and short illness and was buried at sea by his request before the ship reached Seattle.

The Dollar Steamship Company, along with other Dollar companies and the ships were acquired by the United States Maritime Commission in an Adjustment Agreement on 15 August 1938 in which stock in the line was transferred to release $7,500,000 of the line's debt. President Taft was among those transferred to the new American President Lines in which the commission had invested $4,500,000.

The new line would restore the Dollar line's "Round the World" service with refurbished ships meeting new safety regulations with President Taft getting approximately $75,000 of below water line work and $100,000 for other work that included refurbishing crew quarters and boiler work. President Taft was assigned to the New York-Pacific Coast-Asiatic service.

== Army Transport Willard A. Holbrook ==
President Taft was requisitioned from American President Lines in San Francisco by the War Department on 17 June 1941, for compensation of $1,057,002. The ship, as USAT President Taft, made two trips to Manila by way of Honolulu and Guam and other voyages to Hawaii and Alaska until September when converted for additional troop capacity and renamed Willard A. Holbrook in honor of Major General Willard Ames Holbrook. On 4 October 1941 Holbrook departed San Francisco with elements of the 19th Bombardment Group, 30th Bombardment Squadron of the 7th Bombardment Group and 93rd Bombardment Squadron for Manila arriving on 23 October.

=== Pensacola Convoy ===
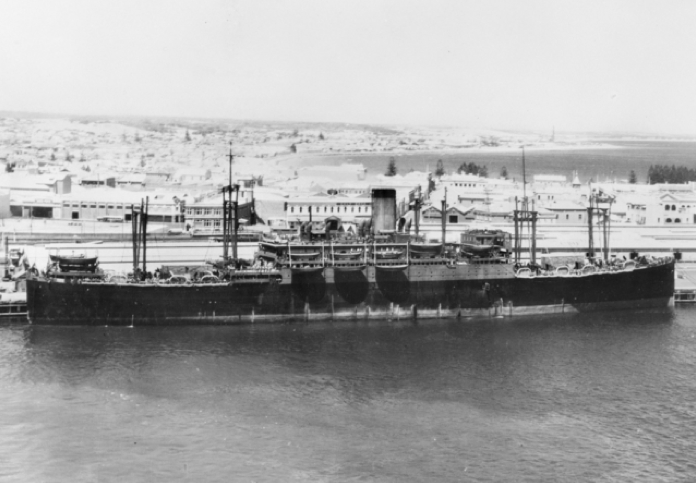
Willard A. Holbrook in Australia

Holbrook embarked the 147th Field Artillery Regiment and 148th Field Artillery Regiment, less one of its battalions, for a total of 2,000 troops at the San Francisco Port of Embarkation and departed 22 November 1941 escorted by the heavy cruiser USS Pensacola for Hawaii due to arrive in the Philippines 4 January 1942. (Note: USS Republic had also embarked troops at SFPOE: 2,630 men and equipment of 2nd Battalion of the 131st Field Artillery Regiment, the 7th Bombardment Group and 48 Army Air Corps officers.) On 30 November the transport left Honolulu for her third Army trip to Manila joining an enlarged convoy still escorted by the Pensacola, officially designated Task Group 15.5, but known commonly as the Pensacola Convoy. (Note: Seen in some Army sources as the Republic convoy for the senior vessel in convoy, USS Republic, as Army tended to name convoys for the senior vessel being convoyed rather than the senior escort vessel.) The convoy departing Hawaii consisted of four transports and three freighters with the escort augmented by the sub-chaser USS Niagara:

Transports:

- USAT Holbrook transporting troops
- USS Republic transporting troops
- USS Chaumont transporting aircraft, munitions and general supplies
- USAT Meigs transporting aircraft, munitions and general supplies

Freighters:

- Admiral Halstead general cargo, some peacetime commercial goods
- Bloemfontein Dutch flag with passengers and cargo, some destined for Java and China
- Coast Farmer general cargo, some peacetime commercial goods

The convoy was taking a southern route, avoiding the Japanese Mandated Islands in the central Pacific, due to approach the Philippines via Port Moresby, New Guinea. The convoy crossed the Equator on 6 December, holding the largest Army Shellback initiation to that time, and got news of the Pearl Harbor attack at 1100, 7 December, convoy time. The convoy improvised defenses, including painting the ships gray while underway, with reports of Japanese activity in the Ellice Islands only some 300 miles away and the Navy ordered a stop at Suva, Fiji Islands while the convoy's destination was reconsidered. At Suva additional weapons were extracted from ship's cargo with Holbrook's Army Ordnance men finding their 75-mm ammunition and improvising sights and mounts for use of their artillery as deck guns. They also improvised pipe mounts for .50-caliber aircraft guns found in cargo for use as defense.

Meanwhile, the convoy's fate was under discussion at the highest levels with an initial decision by the Army and Navy to bring the convoy back to reinforce Hawaii questioned by President Roosevelt with the result the convoy was ordered to proceed to Brisbane, Australia on 12 December arriving safely on 22 December. Resupply of the Philippines was still being considered and the two fastest transports of the convoy, Holbrook and Bloemfontein were selected to attempt the run to the Philippines. However; almost all cargoes had to be unloaded and redistributed, including troops had their organic weapons and supplies and then reloaded. Holbook was reloaded with the two field artillery units. Chaumont was again carrying naval supplies. There was initial difficulty with Bloemfontein as the master noted the ship's obligation was completed with discharge of cargo in Australia but the Netherlands government arranged for the ship to continue as far as Soerabaja, Java with the 26th Field Artillery Brigade and Headquarters Battery and 1st Battalion of the 131st Field Artillery. The ships assigned the task of taking the convoy's redistributed cargoes, including assembled aircraft, north on 28 December. Japanese advances in the Netherlands Indies isolated the Philippines and pushed the defending forces into Bataan and plans were changed. Holbrook was ordered to put into Darwin, being built up as an advanced air base and port, where on arrival 5 January 1942 the troops debarked and supplies were unloaded. (Note: Bloemfontein also made Soerabaja safely on 5 January. Coast Farmer was one of the very few vessels to run the blockade. Dona Nati and a few smaller ships also ran the blockade.)

=== Remainder of wartime service ===
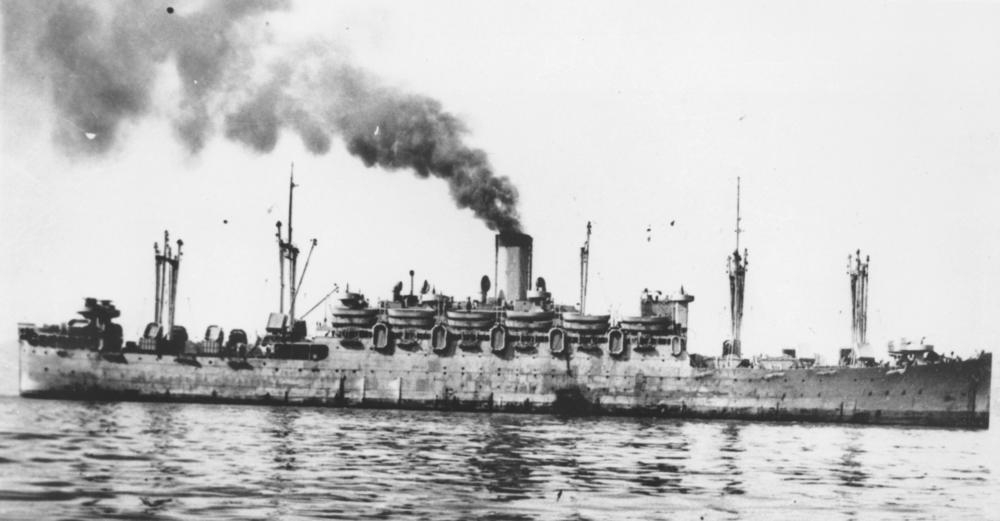
Willard A. Holbrook in Australia, with Carley floats added between her lifeboats

The Army command arriving with the Pensacola Convoy formed the core of what became the Southwest Pacific Area command (SWPA), initially as United States Army Forces in Australia (USAFIA), with that command quickly requisitioning ships that included those from the convoy for local Army fleet service. (Note: Convoy and other vessels requisitioned or held in theater by USAFIA became the core of the Army's Southwest Pacific Area permanent local fleet.) The commanding general, USAFIA, notified superiors he was retaining Holbrook in Australia along with a number of other large vessels. The ship was temporarily retained until other suitable shipping, particularly acquisition of twenty-one Dutch vessels, allowed release of several of the large ships, including Holbrook which did not become a part of the Army's permanent SWPA fleet.

Holbrook was operating between Brisbane, Melbourne and Fremantle in February thus escaping the air attack on Darwin 19 February 1942 that sunk convoy mates Meigs and Admiral Halstead. The ship departed Fremantle on 22 February in convoy MS.5 escorted by USS Phoenix that was bound for Colombo, Ceylon with troops and supplies eventually destined for India and Burma. The convoy comprised Holbrook, the Australian transports Katoomba and Duntroon with two ships attempting to deliver fighters to Java—MS Sea Witch, carrying twenty-seven crated P-40 fighters, and USS Langley with assembled fighters. Sea Witch and Langley broke from the convoy in an unsuccessful attempt, during which Langley was sunk, to deliver the aircraft to Java during the Japanese invasion. Phoenix was relieved as escort by HMS Enterprise and the convoy safely made port.

Holbrook and Duntroon were to return to Australia in convoy SU-4 under escort by HMS Cornwall; however, a Japanese fleet was sighted and Cornwall was ordered to join Admiral Sir James Somerville's fleet. Instead the convoy left Bombay on 4 April and arrived at Colombo, Ceylon on 8 April 1942 during which time the Japanese attack on Ceylon known as the Easter Sunday Raid had taken place and Cornwall had been sunk at sea. The convoy onward to Australia, now composed of Holbrook, Félix Roussel and Duntroon escorted by the armed merchant cruiser HMS Chitral, now had to pass through dangerous waters in which Japanese fleets might be operating; submarines were being sighted in Australian waters and the German auxiliary cruiser Thor was in the area. During the voyage Félix Roussel had picked up the distress signal of Nankin reporting a raider and aircraft, then "abandoning ship" with silence thereafter. (Note: Nankin was captured by Thor, sent to Japan and renamed Leuthen to be managed Hamburg Amerika Line.) The convoy arrived safely at Fremantle on 14 May 1942.

In June 1942, with stops at Adelaide, Sydney and Wellington, the ship returned to Los Angeles and then San Francisco. In San Francisco Holbrook underwent repairs lasting until November 1942 after which the ship returned to the South Pacific. The ship's next voyage was to Hawaii, Nouméa, Fiji, Guadalcanal (where the Guadalcanal Campaign was in its final stages) and then Efate before returning to the United States in February 1943. After three trips to Australia in 1943 with return to San Francisco for major repairs in January 1944 before returning to the South Pacific for stops at Guadalcanal and Auckland. Departing from Seattle in April 1944 the ship transited by way of Honolulu and Funafuti to the Southwest Pacific theater supporting transport operations at Townsville, Australia and Finschhafen, Milne Bay, and Hollandia, New Guinea with a return to the United States in November before once more heading to the Southwest Pacific. (Note: Townsville and the New Guinea locations had become major Army transportation bases by this time. (Masterson, pp=107–108))

Holbrook was selected for conversion to become the hospital ship tentatively named Armin W. Leuschner and transited to Mobile, Alabama arriving in March 1945 at the Alabama Drydock Company. The end of the war resulted in that conversion being halted August 1945 and the ship being completed as a troopship in January 1946, with the name Willard A. Holbrook restored. On arrival at New York another conversion to a transport suitable for carrying 763 dependents at Todd Shipbuilding Company. Holbrook began voyages to Europe for that purpose in March 1946.

== Layup and scrapping ==
The War Department delivered the ship on 8 March 1948 for layup in the Hudson River and on 28 July 1948 the ship was moved to the James River Reserve Fleet where on 12 December 1949 the ship was declared surplus. On 21 October 1957 the ship was sold for $265,780 to Bethlehem Steel and withdrawn from the reserve fleet for scrapping 29 October.

== Bibliography ==
- American Marine Engineer (1920). "Atlantic Coast Notes". The American Marine Engineer. 15 (October). Norfolk, VA: National Marine Engineers' Beneficial Association: 27–28.
- Arnold Hague Convoy Database. "Convoy SU.4". CONVOYWEB.
- Charles, Roland W. (1947). Troopships of World War II (PDF). Washington: The Army Transportation Association. LCCN 47004779. Archived from the original (PDF) on April 2, 2015.
- Clay, Steven E (2011). U. S. Army Order Of Battle 1919-1941 (PDF). Volume 3. The Services: Air Service, Engineers, and Special Troops, 1919–41. Vol. 3. Fort Leavenworth, KS: Combat Studies Institute Press. ISBN 9780984190140. LCCN 2010022326. Archived from the original (PDF) on September 16, 2012.
- Colton, T (July 13, 2011). "Standard Shipbuilding, Shooters Island NY". ShipbuildingHistory. T Colton.
- Gill, G. Hermon (1968). Royal Australian Navy 1939–1942. Australia in the War of 1939–1945. Series 2 – Navy. Vol. 2. Canberra: Australian War Memorial. LCCN 76454854.
- Lloyds (1930). Lloyd's Register of Shipping (PDF). Lloyd's Register of Shipping – via Southampton City Council.
- Maritime Administration. "Willard A. Holbrook". Ship History Database Vessel Status Card. U.S. Department of Transportation, Maritime Administration. Archived from the original on August 27, 2014.
- Matloff, Maurice; Snell, Edwin M. (1953). The War Department: Strategic Planning For Coalition Warfare 1941–1942. United States Army In World War II. Washington, DC: Center Of Military History, United States Army. LCCN 53061477.
- Masterson, Dr. James R. (1949). U. S. Army Transportation In The Southwest Pacific Area 1941-1947. Washington, DC: Transportation Unit, Historical Division, Special Staff, U. S. Army.
- Mayo, Lida (1968). The Technical Services—The Ordnance Department: On Beachhead And Battlefront. United States Army In World War II. Washington, DC: Center Of Military History, United States Army. LCCN 79014631.
- Morton, Louis (1993). The War in the Pacific: The Fall Of The Philippines. United States Army In World War II. Washington, DC: Center Of Military History, United States Army. LCCN 53063678. Archived from the original on September 21, 2012.
- McKellar, Norman L. "Steel Shipbuilding under the U. S. Shipping Board, 1917-1921, Contract Steel Ships, Part V". ShipScribe.
- Nautical Gazette (1920). "US Passenger Liner Launched". The Nautical Gazette. 99 (July 31, 1920). New York: 133.
- Nautical Gazette (1920). "Shipping Board Liners Allocated to Matson Line". The Nautical Gazette. 99 (July 17, 1920). New York: 93.
- Nautical Gazette (1922). "What's In a Name?". The Nautical Gazette. 103 (July 8, 1922). New York: 37.
- Nautical Gazette (1922). "Revised List of Shipping Board's Passenger Liners/More 535s For Pacific Mail". The Nautical Gazette. 103 (July 22, 1922). New York: 81, 111.
- Nimitz, Chester W., Admiral (USN); Steele, James M., Captain (USN) (1942). Command Summary of Fleet Admiral Chester W. Nimitz, USN, v. 1, 7 December 1941 – 31 August 1945. Vol. 1. Operational Archives, Naval History and Heritage Command, Washington Navy Yard, Washington DC: Digitized by the United States Naval War College.
- "Matson Expands". Pacific Marine Review. 17 (December). San Francisco: JS Hines: 102. 1920.
- "Intercoastal Changes". Pacific Marine Review. 18 (July). San Francisco: JS Hines: 430. 1921.
- "Intercoastal Changes". Pacific Marine Review. 18 (December). San Francisco: JS Hines: 748. 1921.
- "Work in Prospect". Pacific Marine Review. 20 (March). San Francisco: JS Hines: 160–161. 1923.
- "advertisement: Pacific Mail's Transpacific Service". Pacific Marine Review. 20 (April). San Francisco: JS Hines: 28. 1923.
- "World Shipbuilding (note & photo)". Pacific Marine Review. 21 (August). San Francisco: JS Hines: 433. 1924.
- "advertisement: United States Government Combination Freight and Passenger Services From Pacific Ports". Pacific Marine Review. 22 (January). San Francisco: JS Hines: 24. 1925.
- "Freights and Charters". Pacific Marine Review. 22 (May). San Francisco: JS Hines: 241. 1925.
- "Pacific Coast Shipping Developments". Pacific Marine Review. 22 (July). San Francisco: JS Hines: 13. 1925.
- "Dollar Gets The Ships". Pacific Marine Review. 23 (May). San Francisco: JS Hines: 198, 235. 1926.
- "Who's Who". Pacific Marine Review. 24 (February). San Francisco: JS Hines: 16. 1927.
- "Who's Who Afloat and Ashore". Pacific Marine Review. 24 (October). San Francisco: JS Hines: 19. 1927.
- "President Lines Round the World". Pacific Marine Review. 35 (November). San Francisco: JS Hines: 23–28. 1938.
- The Register (1924). "While Storm Raged in the Pacific". The Register (11 June 1924). Adelaide, South Australia: 13.
- United States Court of Appeals For the Ninth Circuit No. 13130 (1952). "United States of America vs. R. Stanley Dollar, Dollar Steamship Line, The Robert Dollar Company, etc".
- United States Shipping Board (1922). "Sixth Annual Report of the United States Shipping Board". 6 (June 30, 1922). Washington: United States Government Printing Office.
- United States Shipping Board (1923). "Seventh Annual Report of the United States Shipping Board". 7 (June 30, 1923). Washington: United States Government Printing Office.
- United States Shipping Board (1924). "Eighth Annual Report of the United States Shipping Board". 8 (June 30, 1924). Washington: United States Government Printing Office.
- United States Shipping Board (1924). "Ninth Annual Report of the United States Shipping Board". 9 (June 30, 1925). Washington: United States Government Printing Office.
- Wardlow, Chester (1956). The Technical Services—The Transportation Corps: Movements, Training, And Supply. United States Army In World War II. Washington, DC: Center Of Military History, United States Army. LCCN 55060003.
