= Hugh Stoker =

Hugh Stoker (1920–2000s) was a British-born angler and author who wrote classic texts on the subjects of angling and walking in the Dorset area. His writing career spanned some 40 years; his first book The Seaside Pocket companion was published in 1956 and his last book Wildtrack walks in West Dorset in 1996.

He had lived eastern edge of the caravan park Seatown in Dorset.
