= Seatown =

Hamlet in Dorset, England

Coordinates: 50.7227°N 2.8229°W

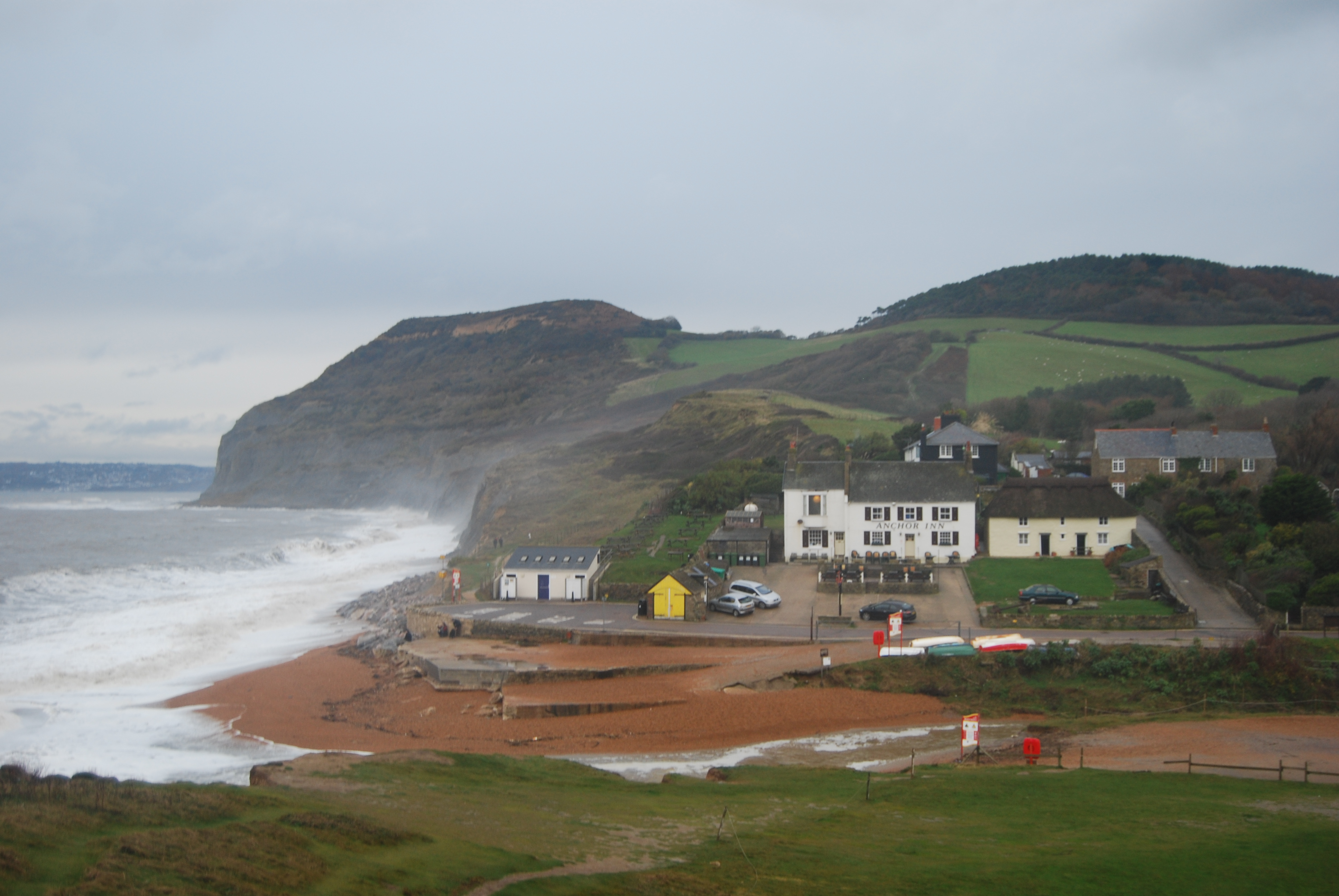
- Seatown in November 2008, with Golden Cap in the background

- Location within Dorset
- OS grid reference: SY420918
- Unitary authority: Dorset
- Ceremonial county: Dorset
- Region: South West
- Country: England
- Sovereign state: United Kingdom
- Post town: Bridport
- Postcode district: DT6
- Police: Dorset
- Fire: Dorset and Wiltshire
- Ambulance: South Western
- UK Parliament: West Dorset

Seatown is a coastal hamlet in Dorset, England, on the English Channel approximately 3 miles (4.8 km) west-southwest of Bridport. It lies within the civil parish of Chideock.

The coast at Seatown is part of the Jurassic Coast, a World Heritage Site. The surrounding area is also designated part of the Dorset National Landscape. Golden Cap, the highest point on the south coast of England, lies 1 mile (1.6 km) to the west.

Seatown comprises a small number of houses, a holiday park, some holiday cottages and a pub. The small River Winniford or Wynreford runs into the sea here. Seatown beach is popular with fossil collectors, with rock of Late Jurassic/Early Cretaceous. The beach is privately owned; access to it is free, but there is a charge for car parking.

'Furmity'—a mix of wheat, dried fruit and sugar, often with added spirits—was one of the products sold at a Whit Monday Fair which used to be held in Seatown.

The current Anchor Inn and the neighbouring cottages are rebuildings of their earlier equivalents which had been destroyed in the Great Storm of 1824.

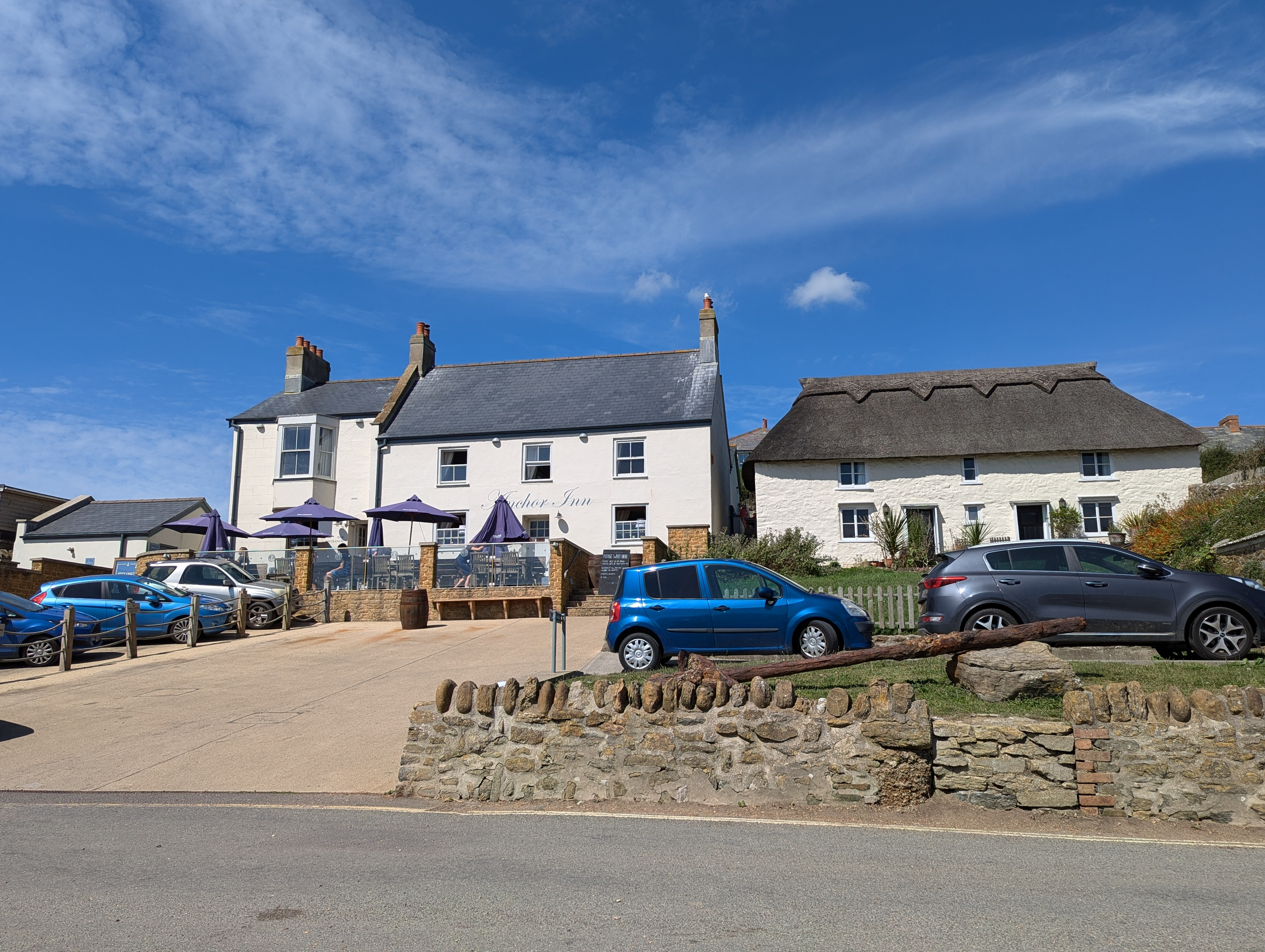
The rebuilt Anchor Inn and rebuilt neighbouring cottages at Seatown, Dorset, England.

== Notable residents ==
- Hugh Stoker, fisherman and author
