= SS Alden Anderson =

Burned off California 1924

SS Alden Anderson was a tanker ship owned and operated by the Associated Oil Company. The vessel was named for Alden Anderson, lieutenant governor of the State of California, from 1903 to 1907. It was destroyed by fire on the night of 29–30 October 1924.

== Incident ==
The oil tanker SS Alden Anderson, of the Associated Oil Company, with 80,000 barrels of oil aboard, had arrived at Martinez, or Avon, California, and had begun unloading on the night of 29–30 October 1924, when the dock started to collapse. The pipes unloading gasoline from the ship broke and electric lines touched the pipes sparking an inferno. The ship, its cargo, 600 feet (180 m) of wharf, a barge with 4,000 barrels of oil aboard, 15,000 cases of gasoline on the wharf, and a warehouse were all destroyed. The ship drifted onto a mud bank where it burned until extinguished by fireboats. "Unable to lower but one boat, 15 men jumped into the bay and swam ashore. The tanker broke from its dock and was swept towards Suisun bay, where it was smoldering at dawn."

The whereabouts of six of the crew of 36 was initially unknown, said F. B. Anderson, assistant general manager of the Associated Oil Company, in a statement to the Associated Press at 1000 hours on 30 October. "There were many boats at the scene of the fire with many avenues of escape and there is hope the missing will be accounted for." A later dispatch by the United Press stated that practically all of the 36 crew were accounted for at dawn.

The total loss of the dock and the steamer was put at $1,500,000.
