= Lone Pine (tree) =

Tree on Turkey's Gallipoli Peninsula

Coordinates: 40°13′49.48″N 26°17′14.74″E

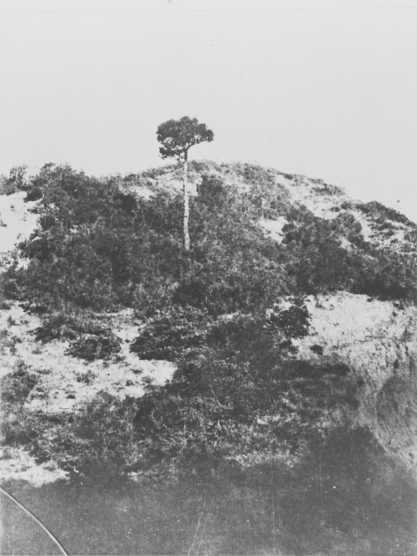
The original Lone Pine landscape before the charge in 1915. The tree (Pinus brutia) was used as target practice. Photo: AWM

The Lone Pine was a solitary tree on the Gallipoli Peninsula in Turkey, which marked the site of the Battle of Lone Pine in August 1915. It was a Turkish or East Mediterranean pine (Pinus brutia).

Pines are often planted as memorials in civic parks around Australia to the Australian and New Zealand soldiers who fought in Gallipoli are also known as "Lone Pines" or "Gallipoli Pines".

Pinus brutia or Turkish pine is native to the Gallipoli Peninsula and scattered specimens grew across the hills of the battlefield, and all the trees except the famous one were cut down by the Turks for construction of their defensive trenches.

Aleppo pine (Pinus halepensis) is not native to the Gallipoli peninsula but grows naturally in other Mediterranean countries like Spain, Italy, Greece, Syria and Morocco but is widely planted. Logs and branches of Aleppo pine were brought into Gallipoli from plantations beyond the Dardanelles and also used to roof the Turkish trenches and dug-outs.

However, the origins of both the Aleppo pine (Pinus halepensis) and the Turkish pine (Pinus brutia), now widely planted across Australian civic gardens as "Lone Pines", can be traced back to the Gallipoli battlefield of 1915.

The tree at the Lone Pine Cemetery at Gallipoli is of a third species: stone or umbrella pine (Pinus pinea).

== The original Lone Pine ==
The original Lone Pine, a Turkish pine (Pinus brutia), is native to the Gallipoli Peninsula, and scattered specimens grew across hills. The original Lone Pine was the sole survivor of a group of trees that had been cut down by Turkish soldiers for timber and branches to cover their trenches during the battle. This remaining solitary tree was used as target practice and was obliterated during the battle.

Other trees, particularly Aleppo pines (Pinus halepensis) which are widely planted across the region but not endemic to Gallipoli, were brought from plantations beyond the Dardanelles and also used to roof the Turkish trenches.

Turkish pines are closely related to Aleppo pine, and at the time were regarded as a subspecies, but now they are usually classified as a different species.

Pine cones from both species (Aleppo and Turkish pines) were retrieved by various Australian soldiers and brought home to Australia.

== Tree at Lone Pine Cemetery, Gallipoli ==
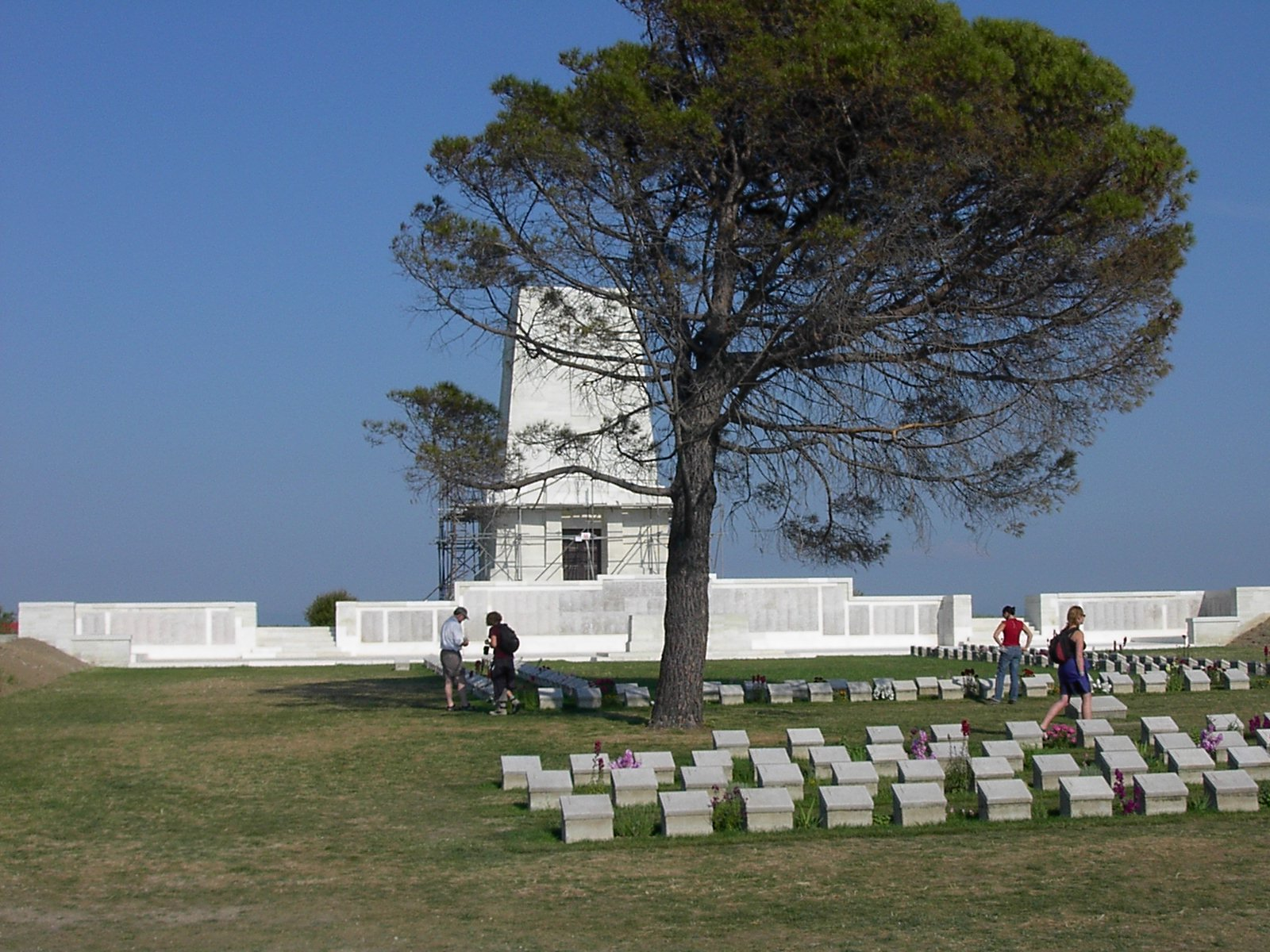
Lone Pine at Lone Pine Cemetery, Gallipoli was planted in the 1920s and is native to Spain and Italy. Pinus pinea

At the Lone Pine Cemetery on the Gallipoli peninsula, a solitary pine was planted in the 1920s to symbolise the original Lone Pine. This tree was inspected in 1987 by an Australian botanist and confirmed to be a stone pine (Pinus pinea) and is native to Spain and Italy.

== Trees in Australia ==
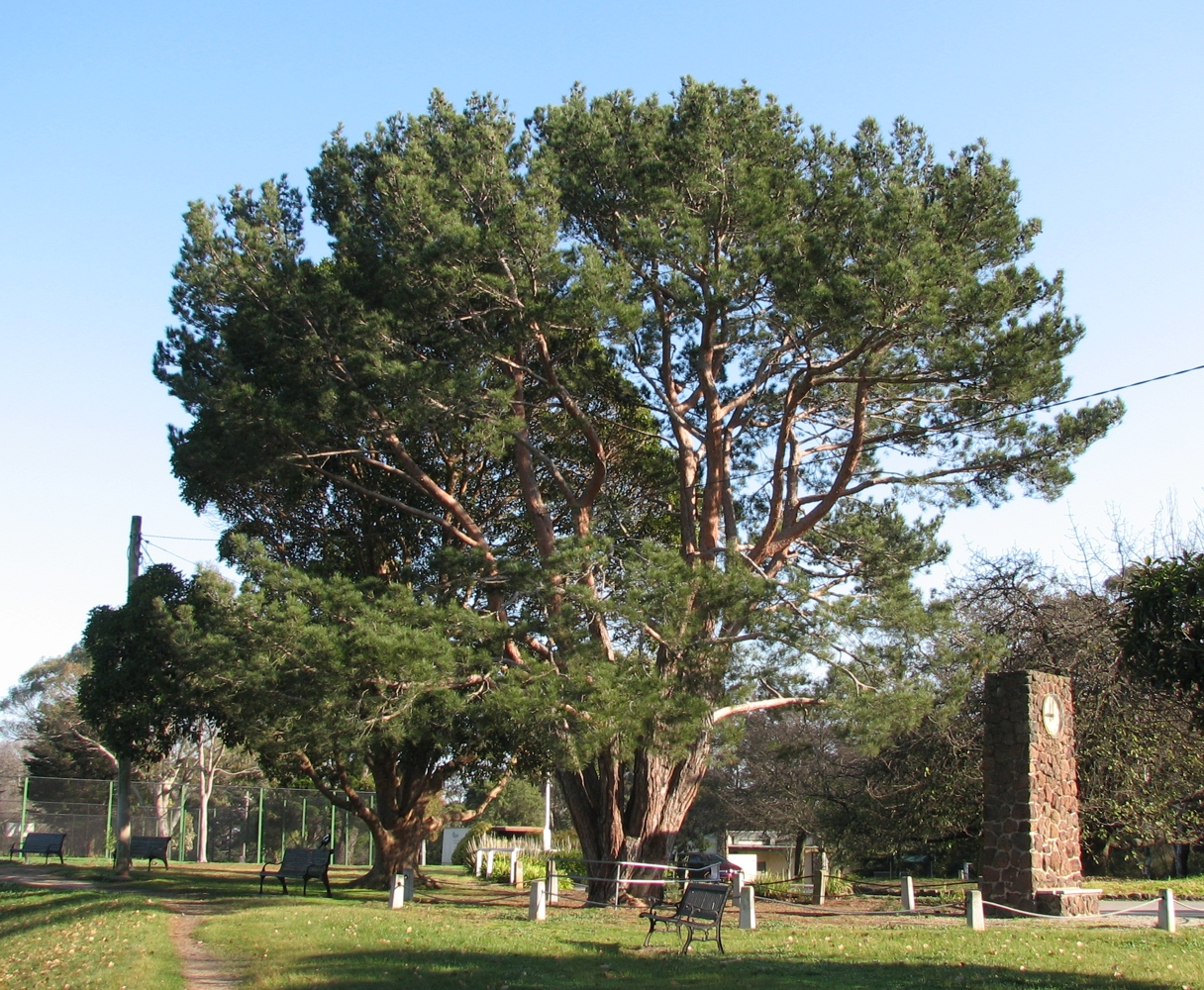
The Lone Pine planted at Wattle Park (Melbourne) in 1933 is one of the originals grown from seed from the cone collected by Thomas Keith McDowell. It comes from the solitary "Lone Pine". Pinus brutia.

=== Turkish pine (Pinus brutia) ===
Thomas Keith McDowell, an Australian soldier from Wonthaggi, enlisted in the 23rd Battalion and fought at Gallipoli. He brought a cone from the actual "lone pine", a Turkish pine, Pinus brutia, from the battle site back home to Australia. Many years later seeds from the cone were planted by his wife's aunt Emma Gray of Grassmere, near Warrnambool, Victoria and five seedlings emerged, with four surviving. These seedlings were planted in four different locations in Victoria: Wattle Park, Melbourne (8 May 1933), the Shrine of Remembrance (11 June 1933), the Soldiers Memorial Hall at The Sisters near Terang (18 June 1933) and Warrnambool Botanic Gardens (23 January 1934).

The tree at the Shrine Reserve was planted near the north-east corner of the building by Lieutenant-General Sir Stanley Savige, founder of Melbourne Legacy, at a formal ceremony.

In 1964, the President of Warrnambool Branch of Legacy Australia, Tom Griffiths, proposed at its Perth Conference to raise and distribute seedlings of the Lone Pine in time to mark 50 years since the Gallipoli landings.

The project was strongly supported by delegates and some cones of Pinus brutia were collected from trees at ‘The Sisters’ and the Warrnambool Gardens and sent to Ben Benallack at the Forests Commission Victoria in Melbourne. But Pinus brutia is notoriously difficult to grow and the seeds failed to germinate.

The Melbourne Branch of Legacy collected more cones from the Lone Pine tree near the Shrine of Remembrance and this time about 150 seedlings were successfully raised at the Forests Commission's nursery at Macedon under the direction of Dr Ron Grose, Director of Silviculture. A further 1000 seedlings were raised in 1989 with the assistance of the department together with the Victorian College of Agriculture and Horticulture at Richmond.

In 2005 the tree at the Shrine required cable bracing following the loss of a major limb and in August 2012, despite measures taken to try to save the tree from the effects of disease caused by the fungus Diplodia pinea, it was removed. A "grandchild tree" was planted nearby in 2006. A Middle Park man, Andrew Lees, collected cones from the broken limb in 2005 and by 2015 had managed to germinate about 20 seedlings.

The Lone Pine at the Soldiers Memorial Hall at The Sisters near Terang blew down in July 2016.

The trees grown from Thomas Keith McDowell's cone are Turkish pine, Pinus brutia, and can claim to be the only true descendants of the original Lone Pine at Gallipoli.

=== Aleppo pine (Pinus halepensis) ===
Another soldier, Lance Corporal Benjamin Smith from the 3rd Battalion, also retrieved a cone from the battle site and sent it back to his mother in Australia, (Mrs McMullen), who had lost another son, Mark Smith, at the battle. This cone was an Aleppo pine (Pinus halepensis) which is not endemic to the area. Logs and branches of Aleppo pine had been brought into Gallipoli from plantations beyond the Dardanelles and used to roof the Turkish trenches and dug-outs. This seems to be the most likely source of Lance Corporal Smith's cone.

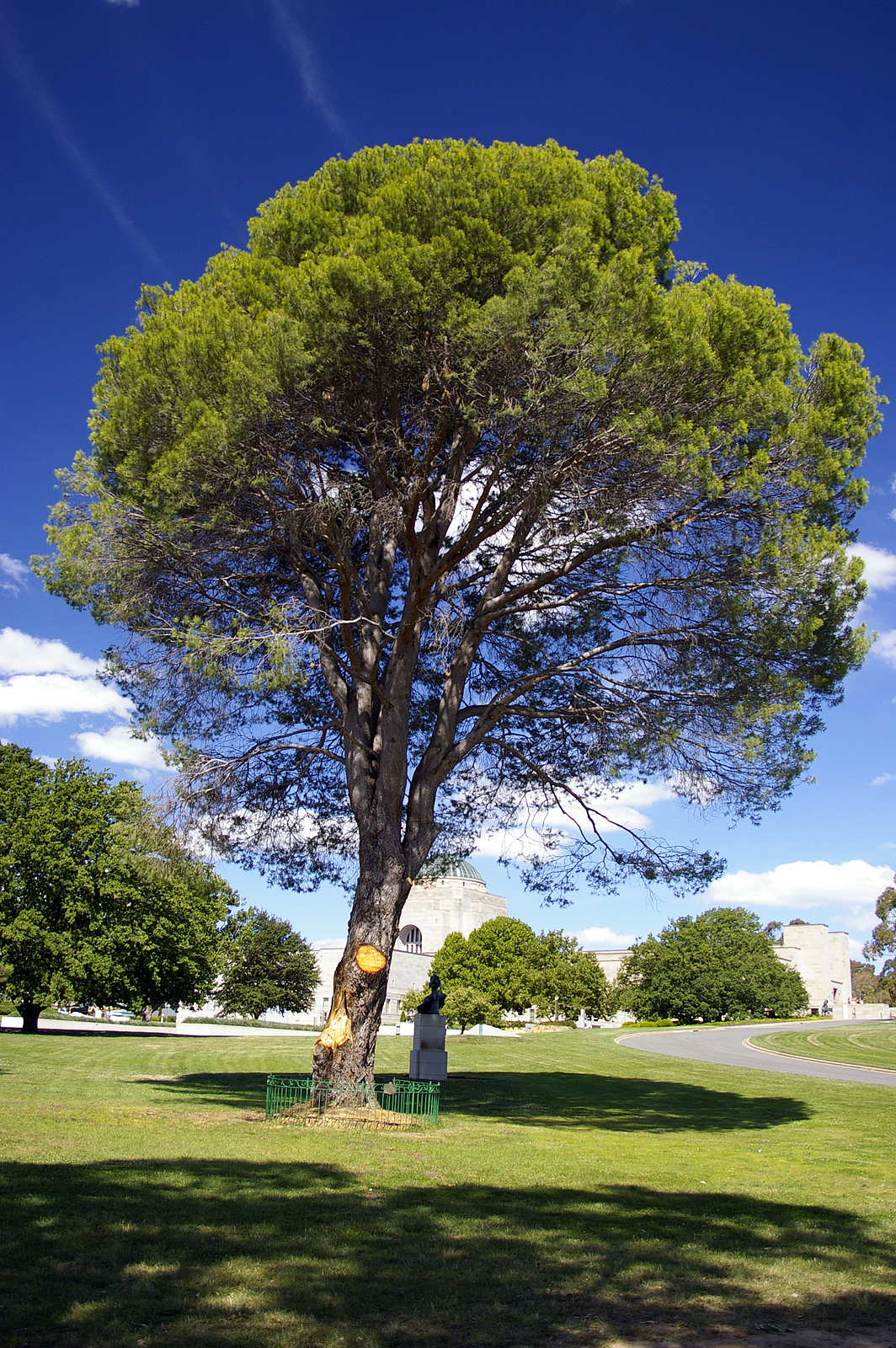
Lone Pine at the Australian War Memorial (Canberra) is an Aleppo pine Pinus halepensis. It was planted in 1934 by the Duke of Gloucester. The seed came from a cone collected by Benjamin Smith from a Turkish trench. Aleppo pine is not native to the Gallipoli peninsula but was brought in by the Turks to reinforce their fortifications.

Benjamin Smith's cone was an Aleppo pine, Pinus halepensis retrieved from a Turkish trench and seeds were planted by his mother in 1928, and two seedlings were raised. One was presented to her home town of Inverell, New South Wales and the other was forwarded to Canberra where it was planted by Prince Henry, Duke of Gloucester at the Australian War Memorial (AWM) in October 1934. The AWM lone pine lost two of its large lower limbs by strong winds preceding a thunderstorm on 27 December 2008. However, tree surgeons were able to save the historic tree.

The most common Lone Pine tree planted in civic parks across Australia is Aleppo pine (Pinus halepensis) with seedlings often derived from a parent tree planted in the grounds of the Australian War Memorial in Canberra.

Both Melbourne Legacy and the Yarralumla Nursery in Canberra have raised and grown seedlings over a number of years, sourced from both species and from both trees at the Shrine of Remembrance and the Australian War Memorial respectively. They have presented to schools as well as ex-service and other organisations throughout Australia.

There are many memorial plaques in front of fine specimens of "Lone Pines" in cities and gardens across the country which are Pinus halepensis and claim to be direct descendants of the solitary tree stood on the ridgetop. This is not technically right. Turkish pines are very closely related to Aleppo pine, and at the time were regarded as a subspecies, but now they are usually classified as a different species.

However, the origins of both the Aleppo pine (Pinus halepensis) and the Turkish pine (Pinus brutia), now widely planted across Australian civic gardens as "Lone Pines" can be traced back to the Gallipoli battlefield of 1915.

=== Other "Lone Pines" include ===
- Plaques at the base of the pine tree at the Oatley Park Avenue entrance to Oatley Park, NSW, state it was planted in 1920 by Owen Jones Davies from pine cones obtained from Lone Pine, Gallipoli.
- The two Lone Pine seedlings at the Australian Defence Force Academy in Canberra were presented by the RSL on Remembrance Day, 11 November 1987.
- The pine at the Battle of Lone Pine memorial at Adelaide's National War Memorial is accompanied by a plaque stating "This pine is a seedling related to the original Lone Pine on Gallipoli"
- A seedling of Pinus brutia, propagated from the original tree at Lone Pine was planted in the grounds of the Victorian School of Forestry at Creswick in 1965 and dedicated with a plaque unveiled by Legacy on 23 March 1975. The crown of the tree was damaged in about 1976.
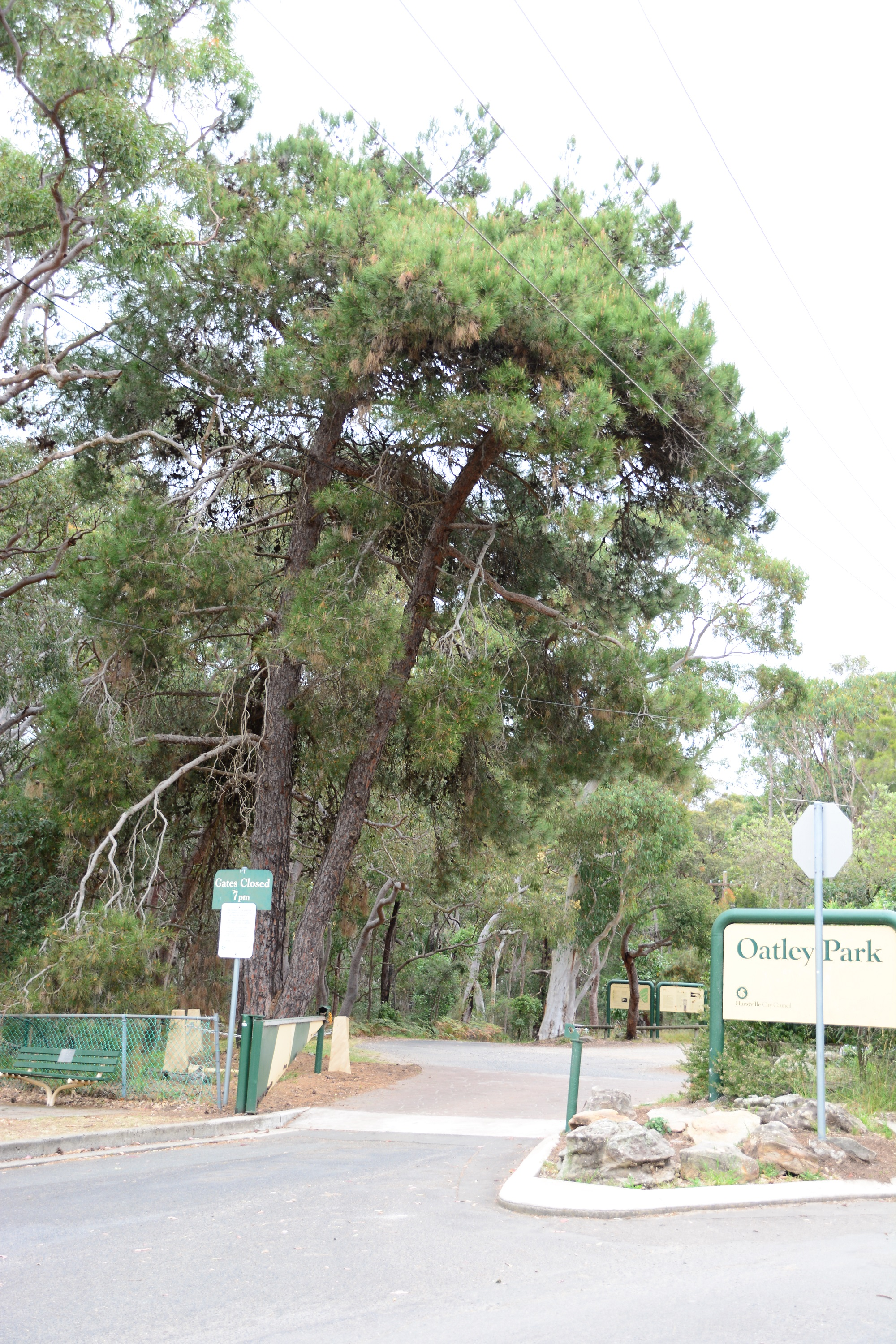
Lone pine tree at
Oatley Park, NSW -
Pinus brutia

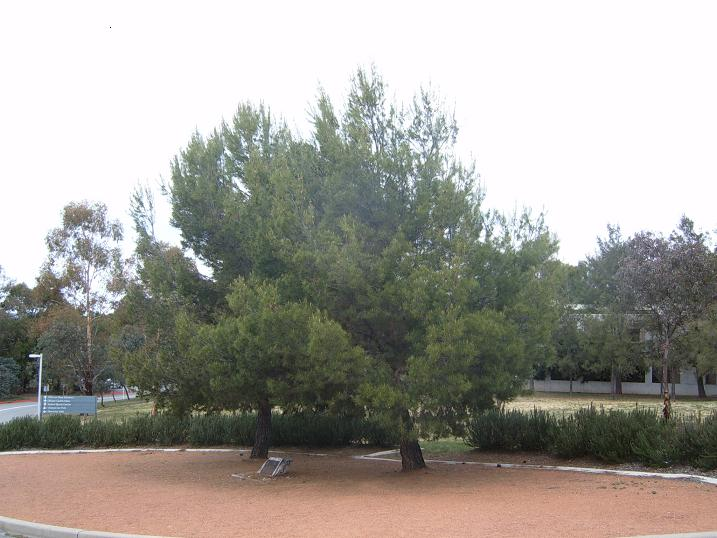
Two Lone Pine seedlings at ADFA (Canberra) - Pinus halepensis

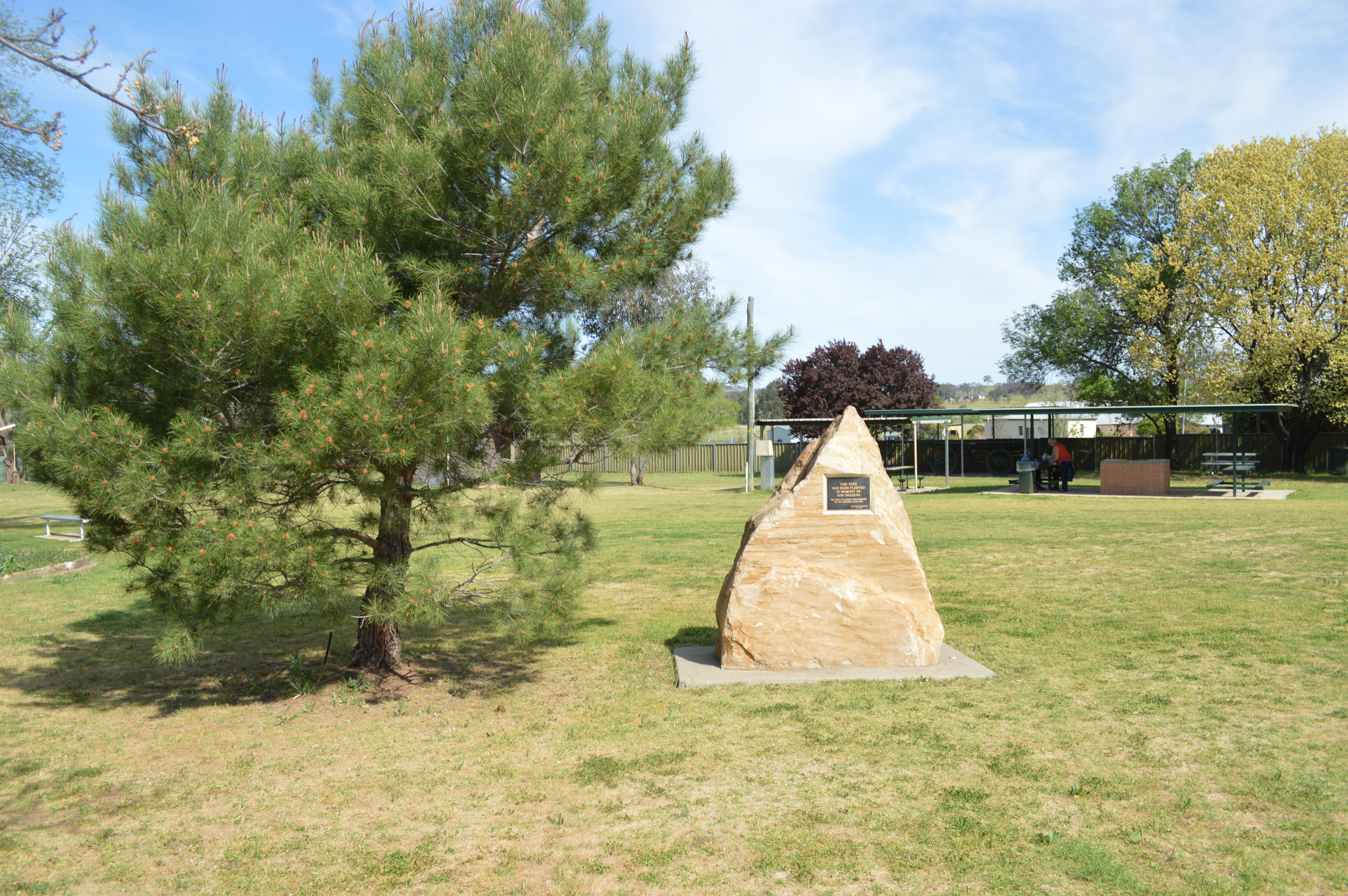
Coolah, NSW -
Pinus halepensis

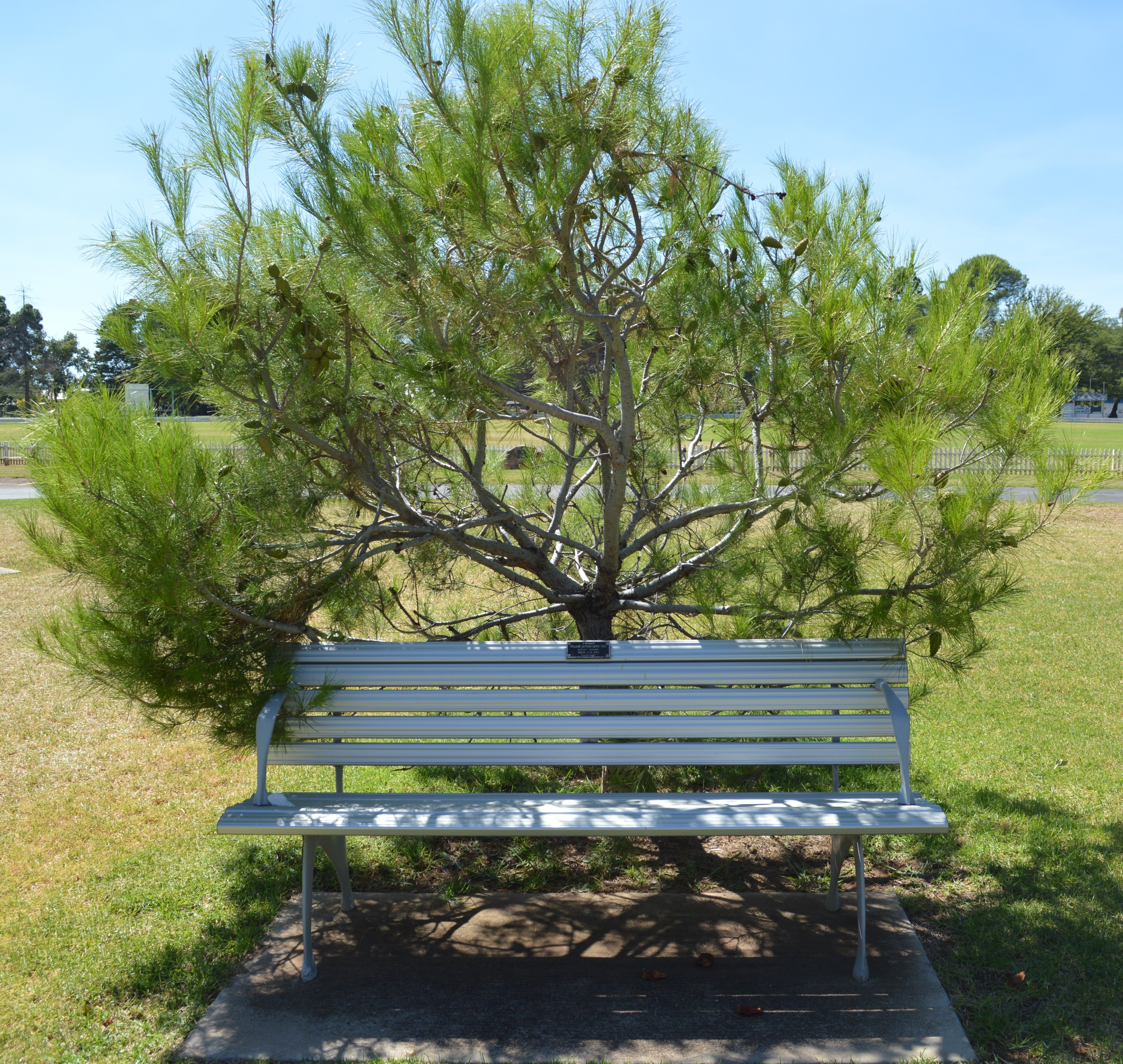
Cootamundra, NSW -
Pinus halepensis

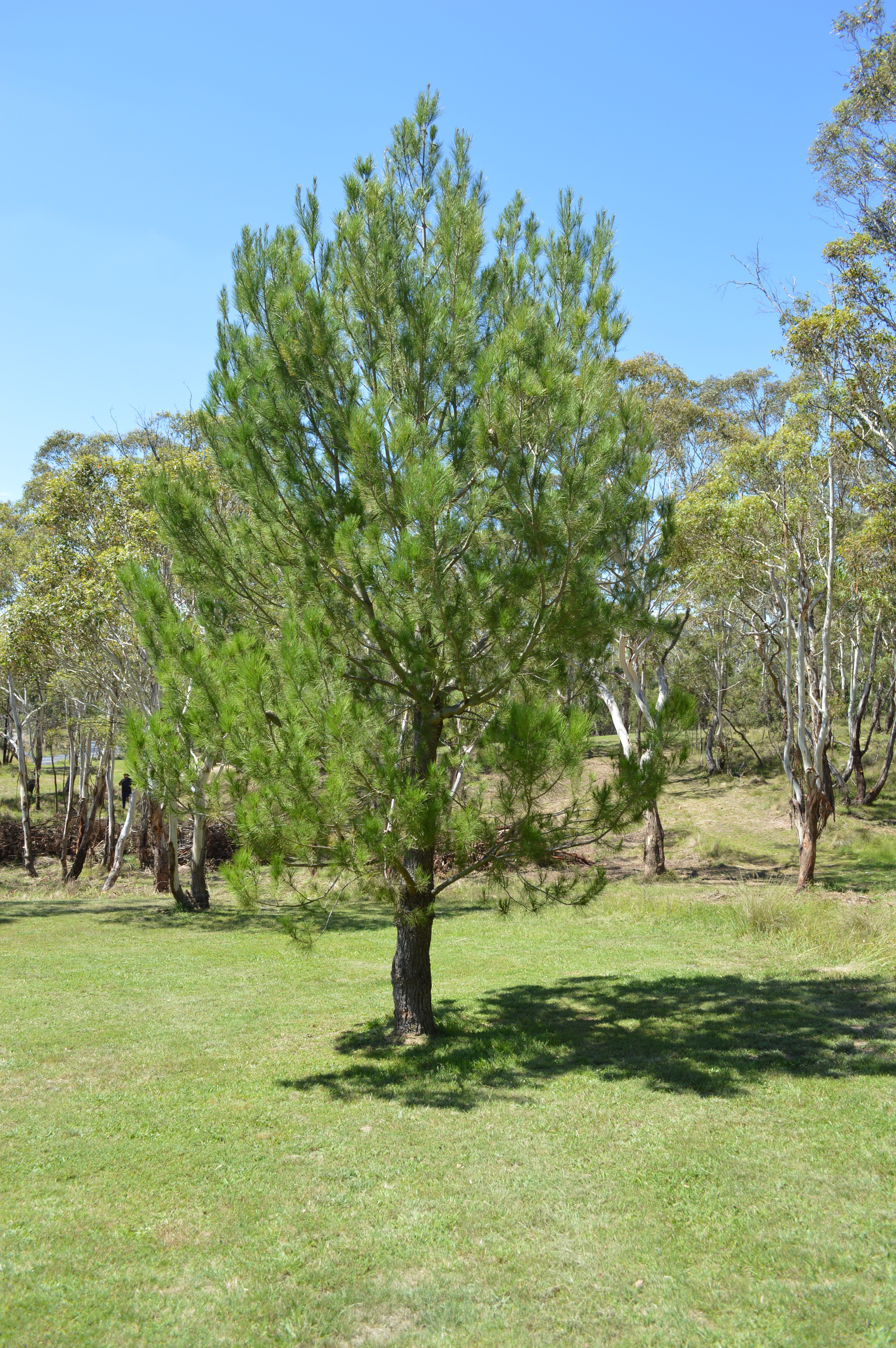
Lowther, NSW -
Pinus halepensis

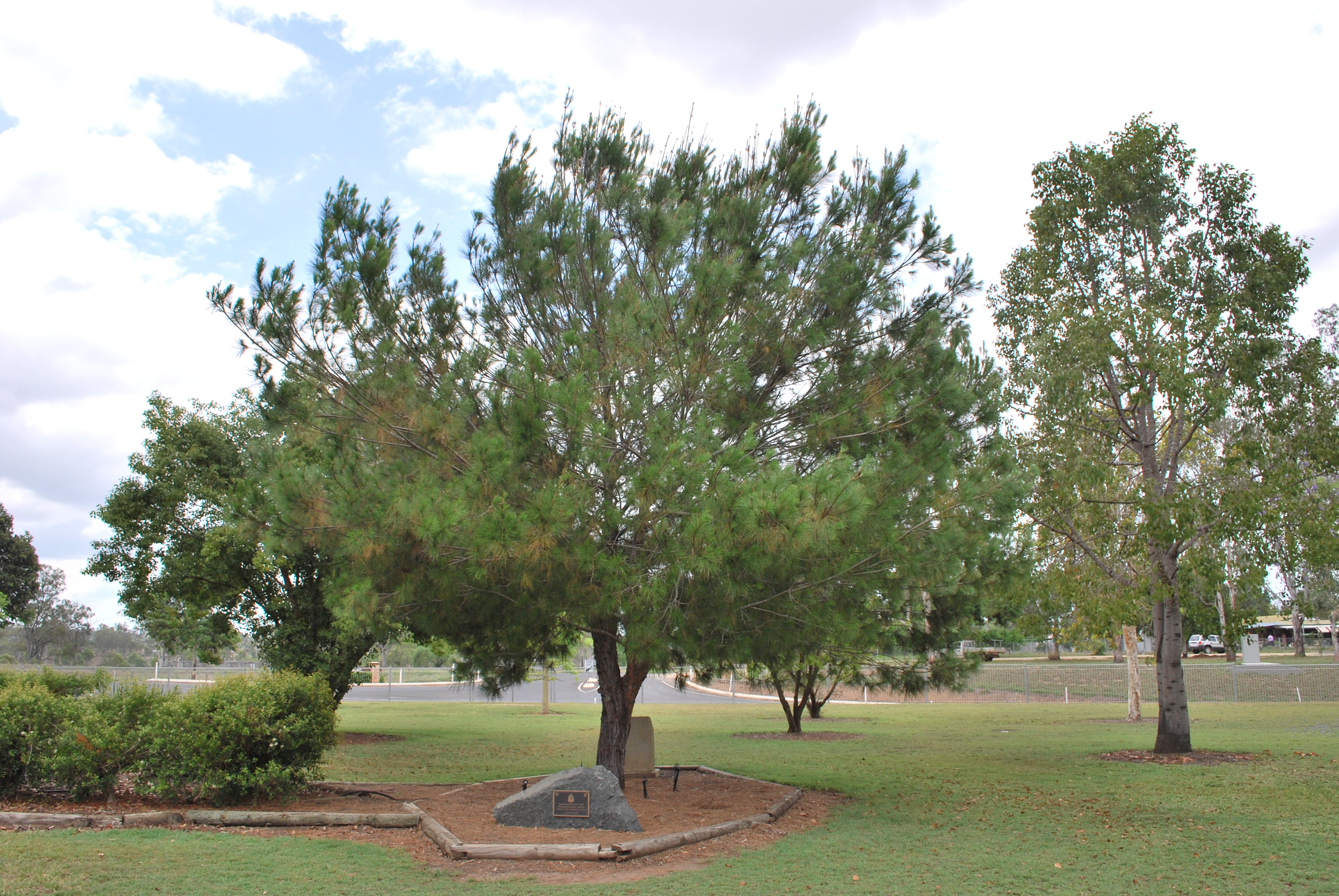
Mundubbera, Qld -
Pinus halepensis

"Lone Pines" with accompanying plaques:

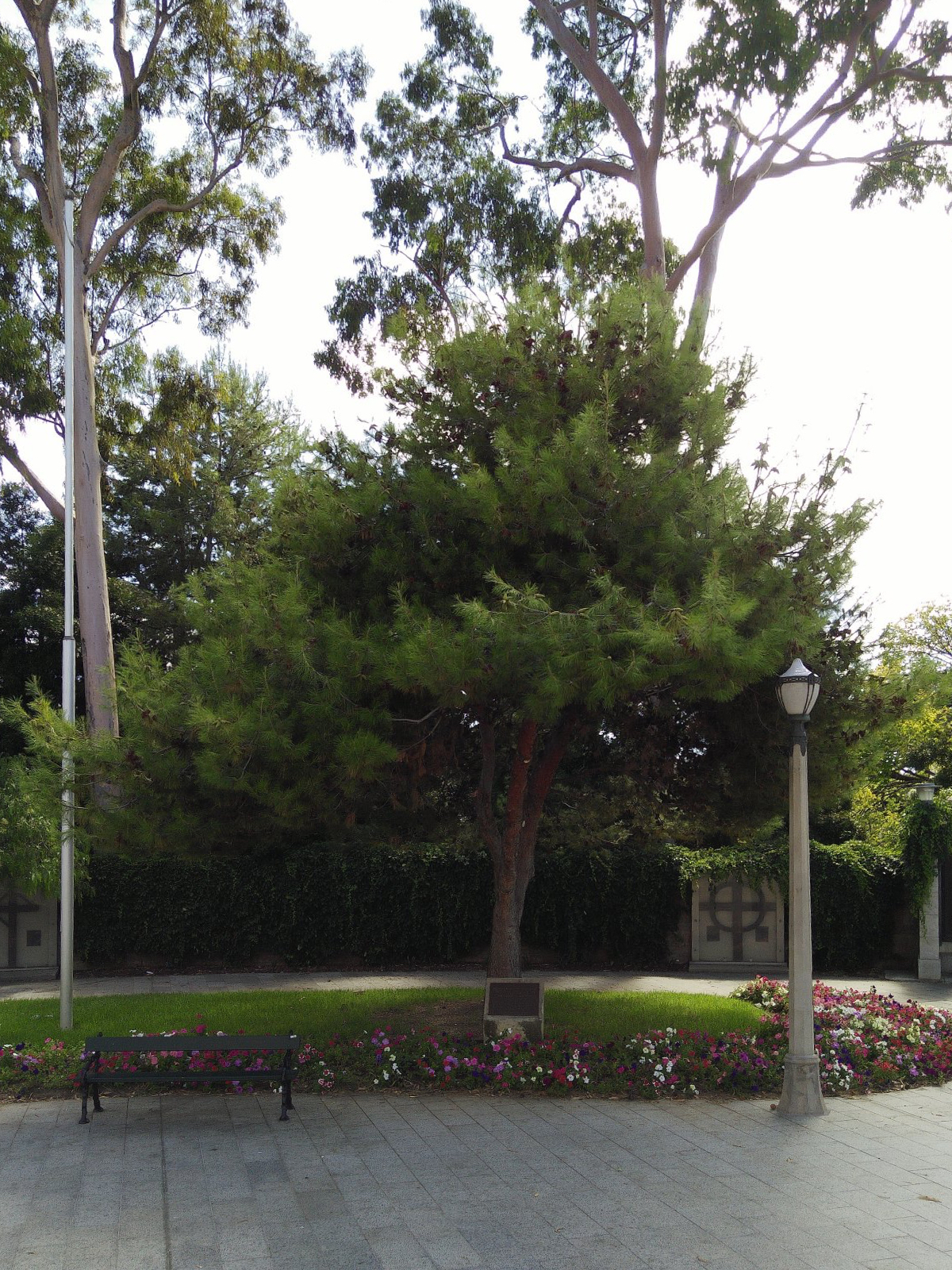
Adelaide's memorial -
Pinus halepensis

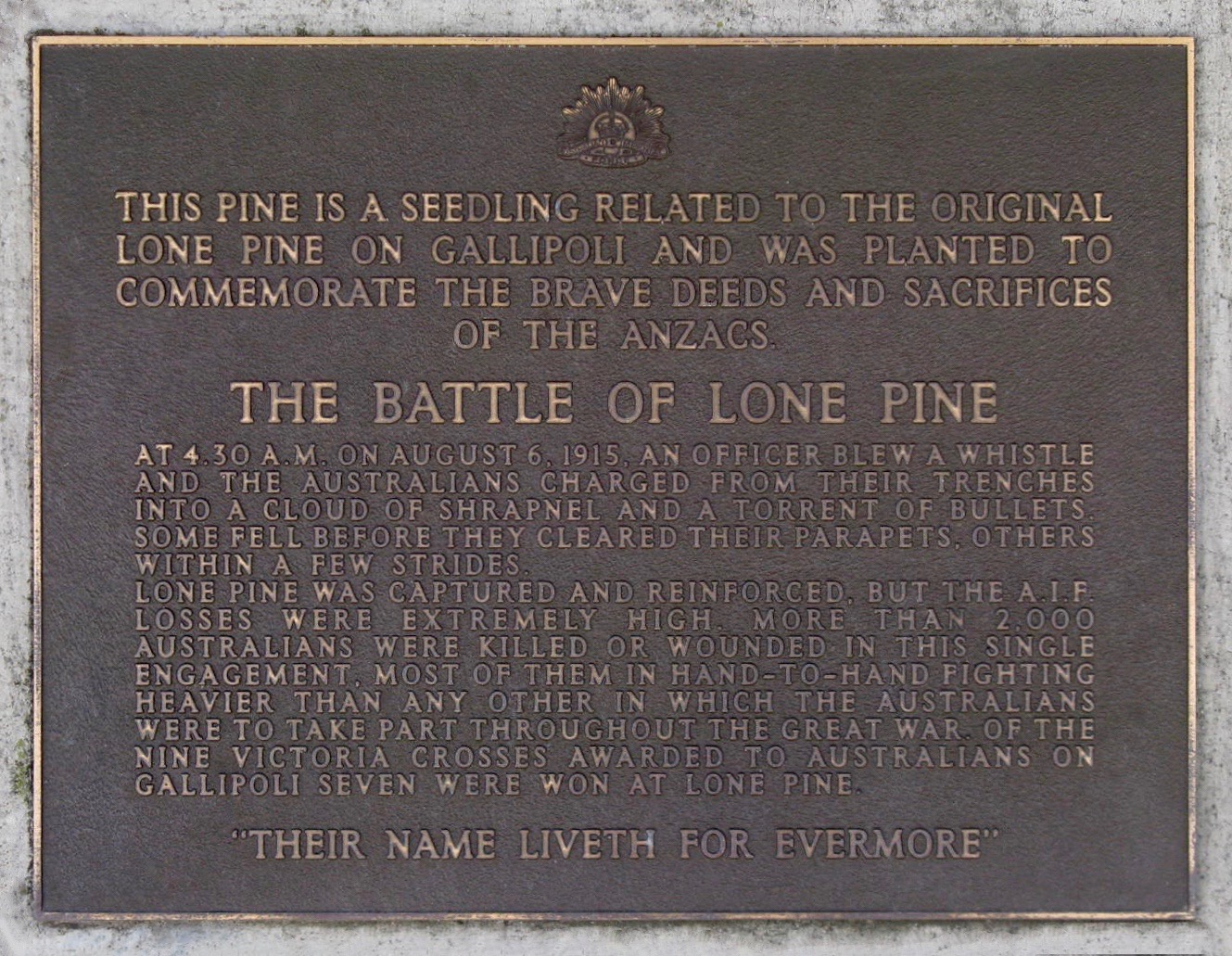

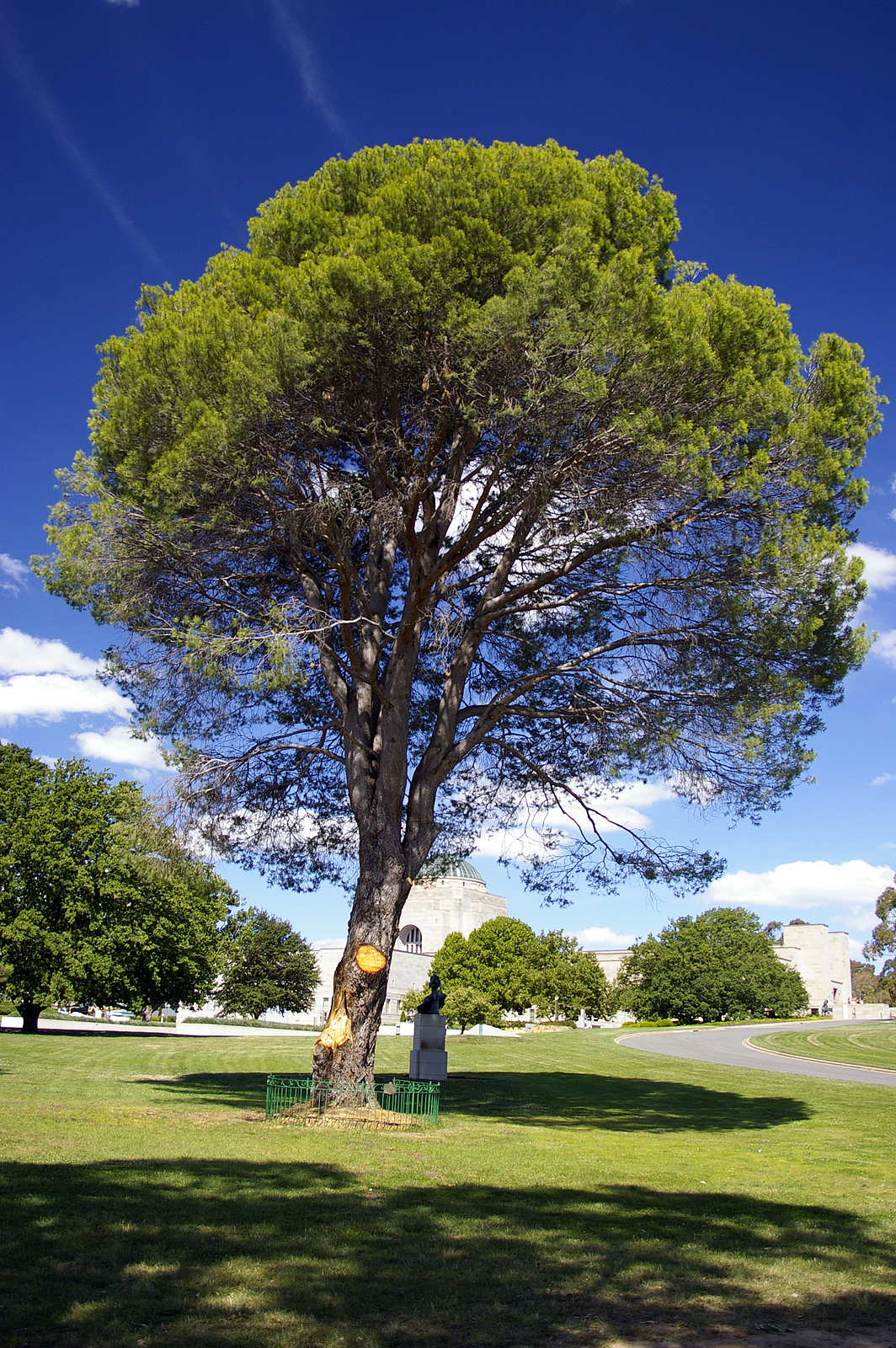
Australian War Memorial
Pinus halepensis

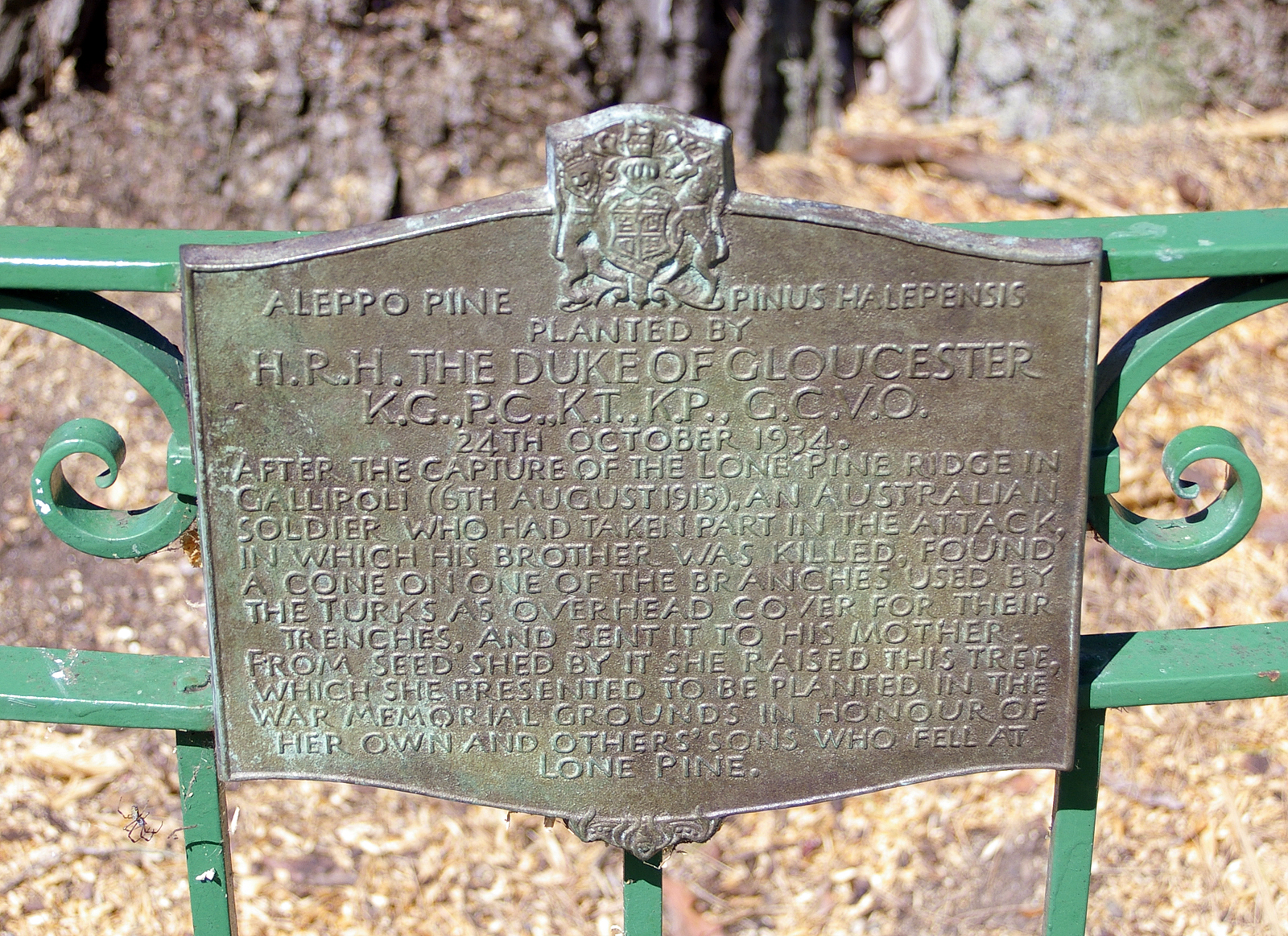

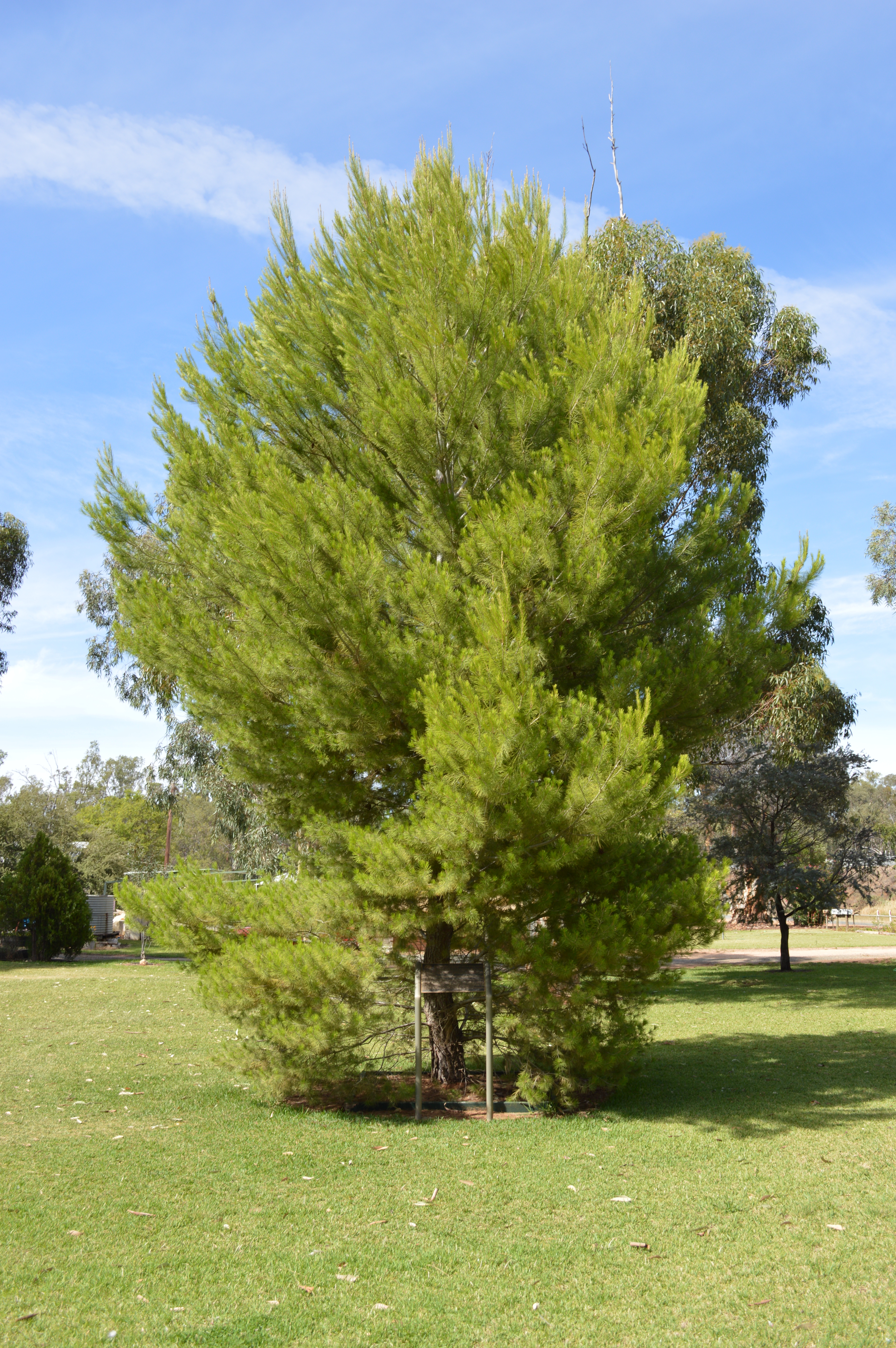
Balranald, NSW -
Pinus halepensis

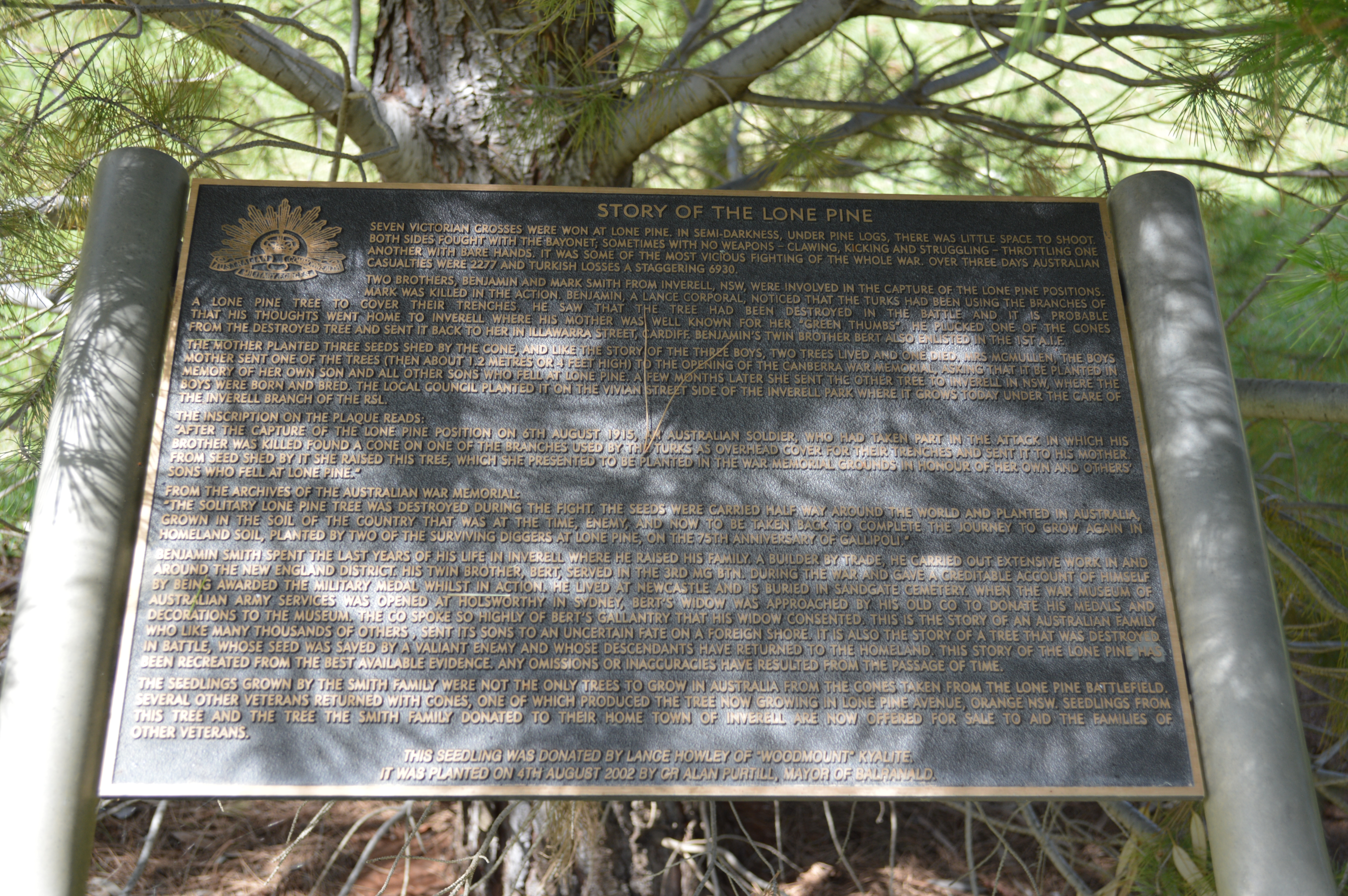

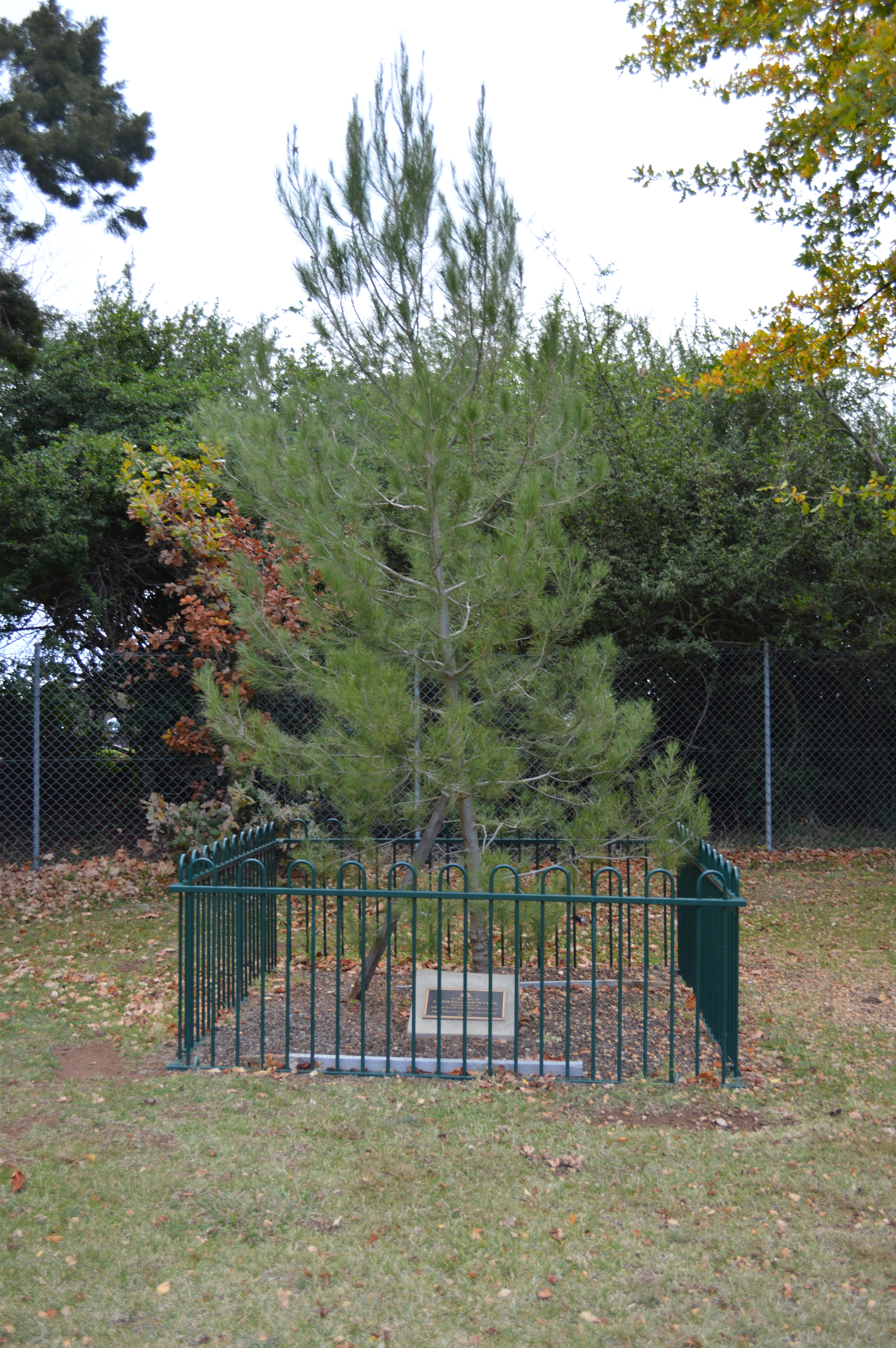
Crookwell, NSW -
Pinus halepensis

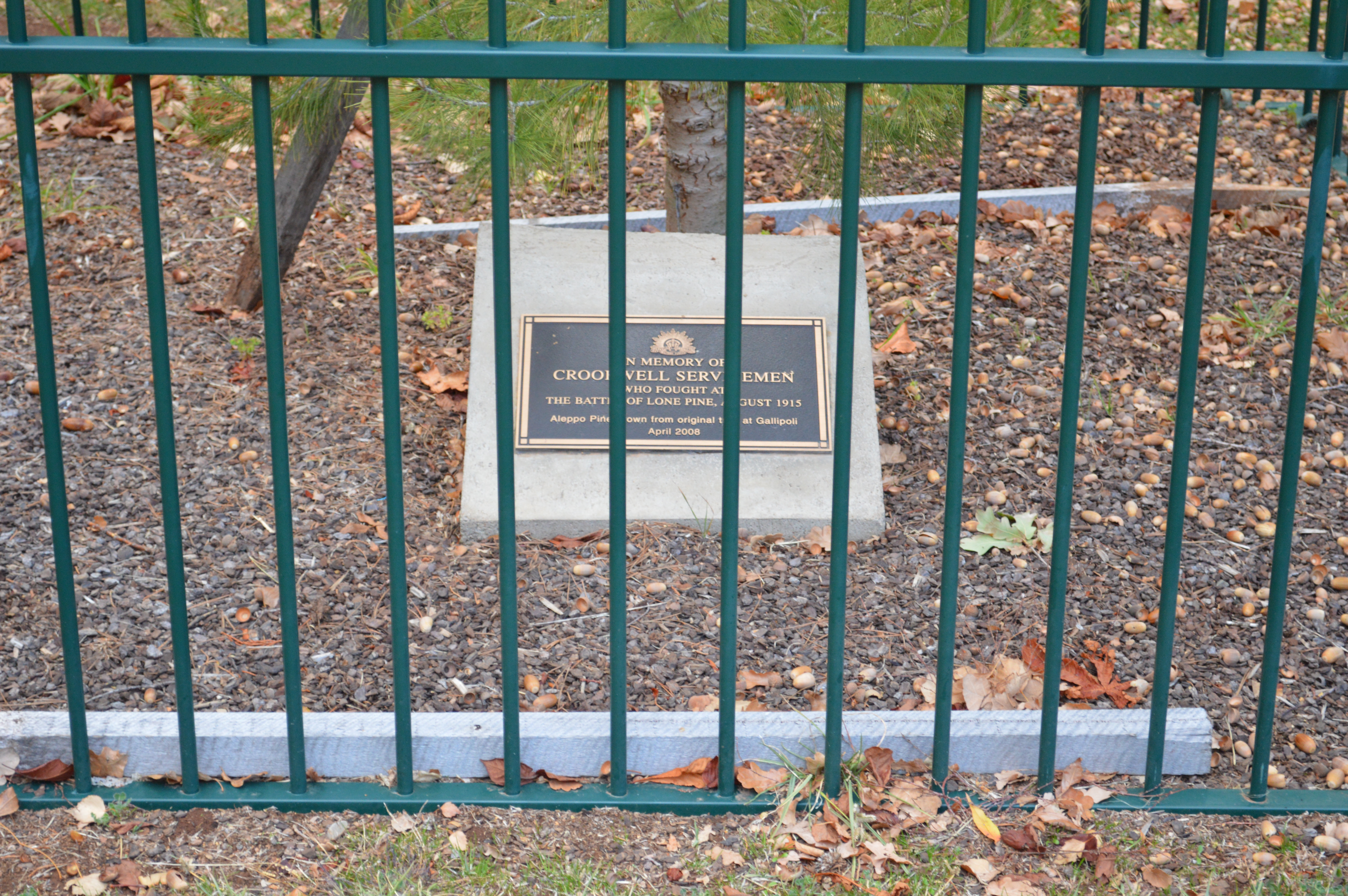

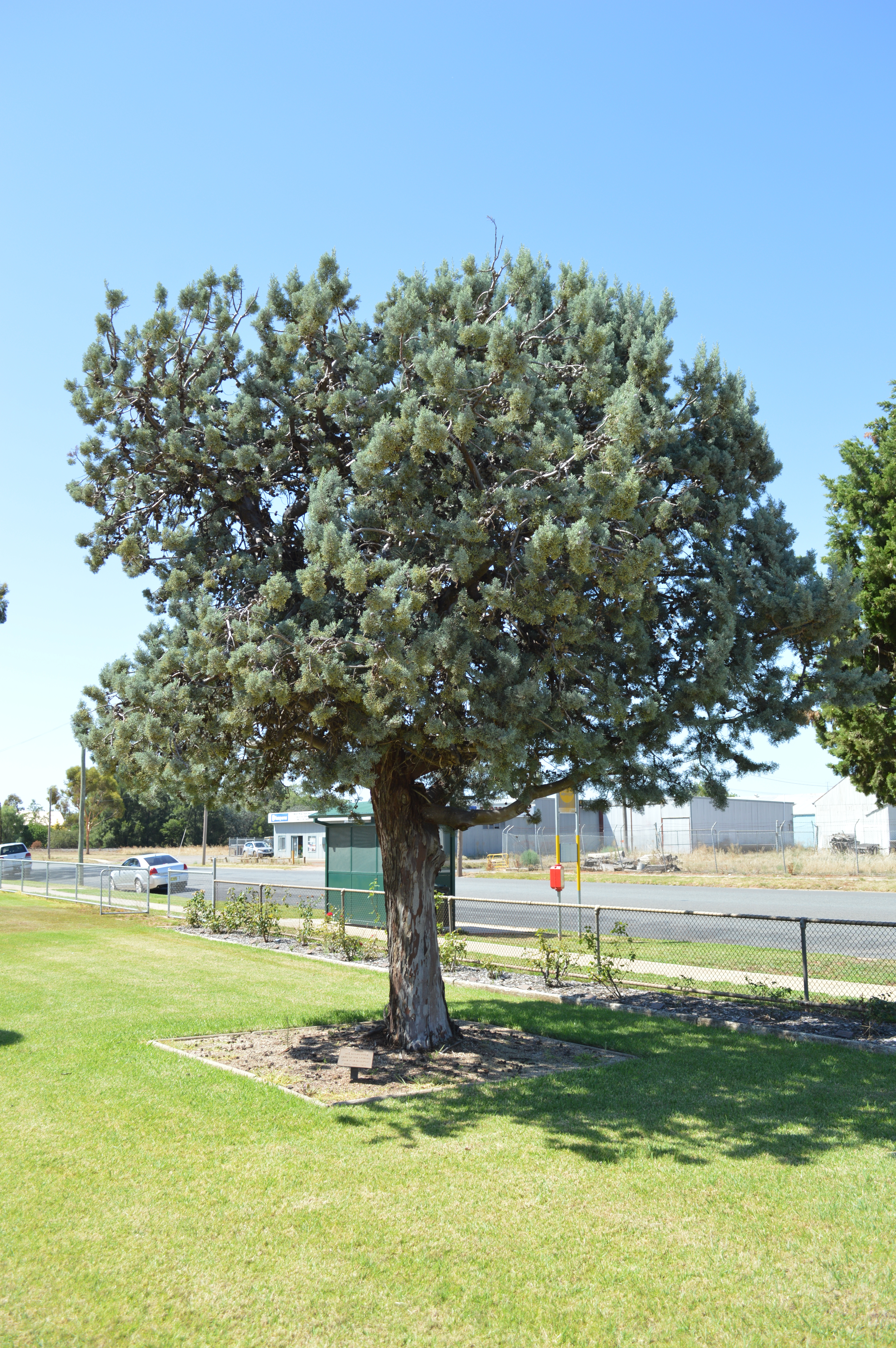
Finley, NSW

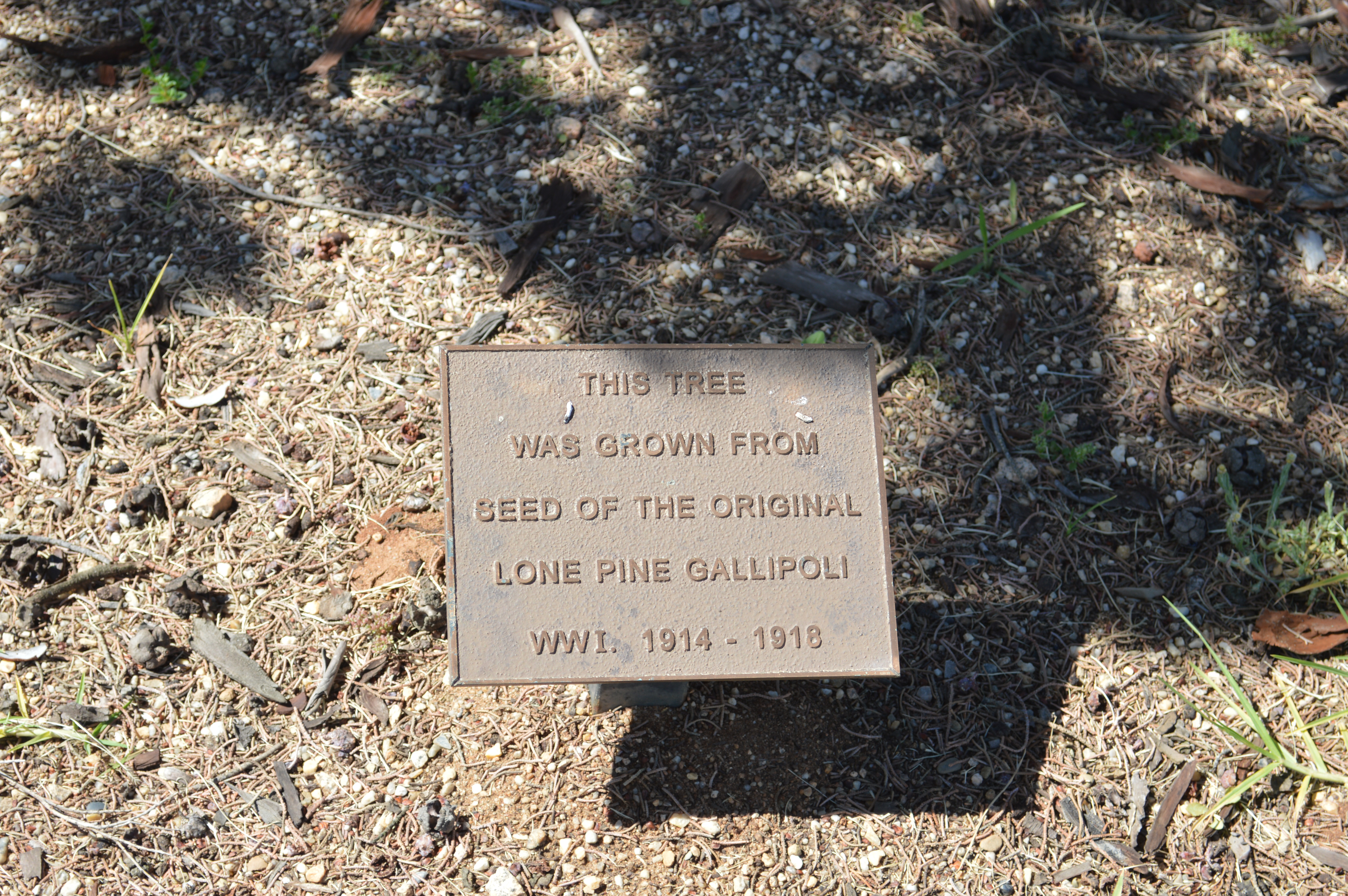

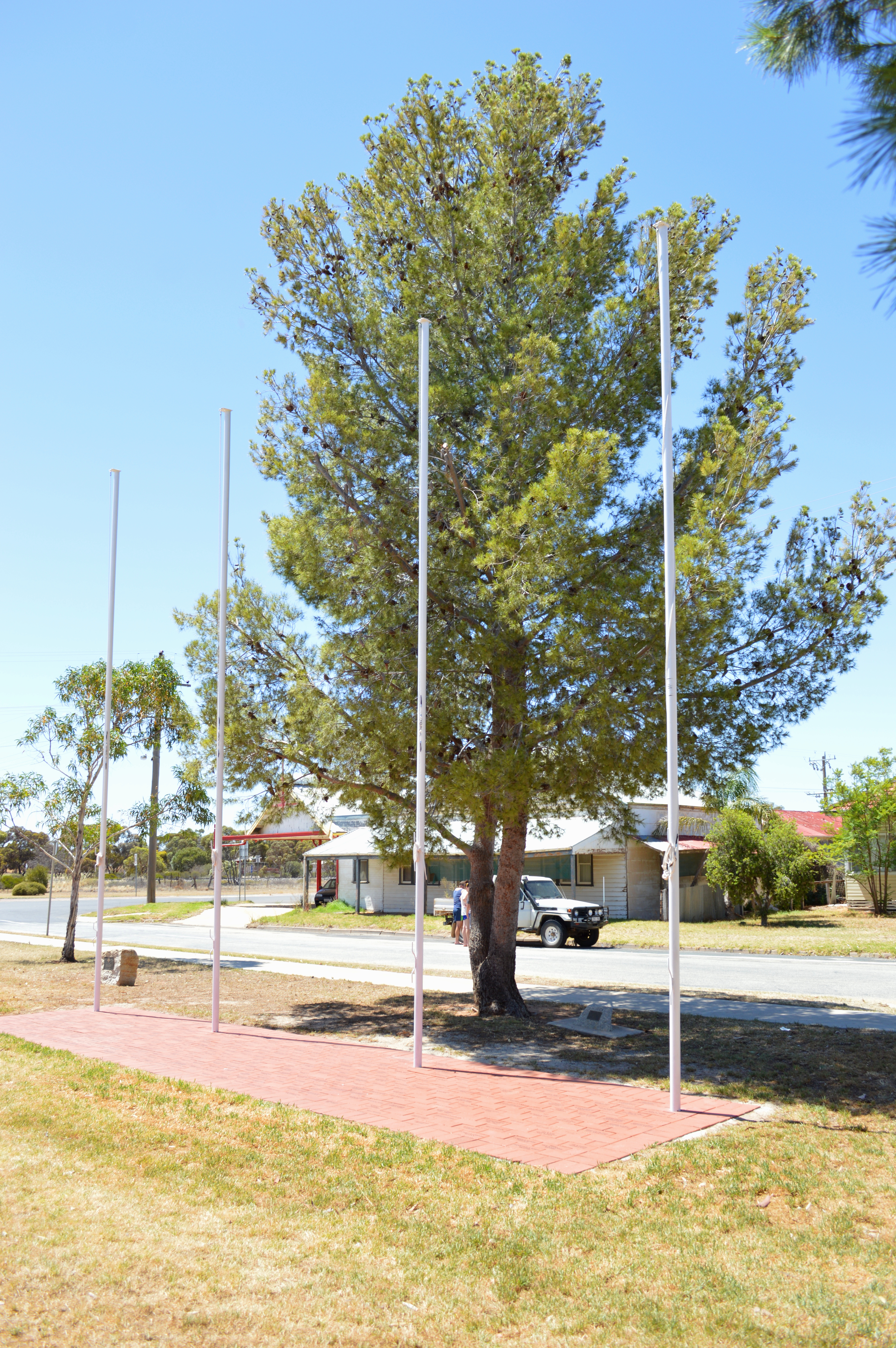
Manangatang, Vic -
Pinus halepensis

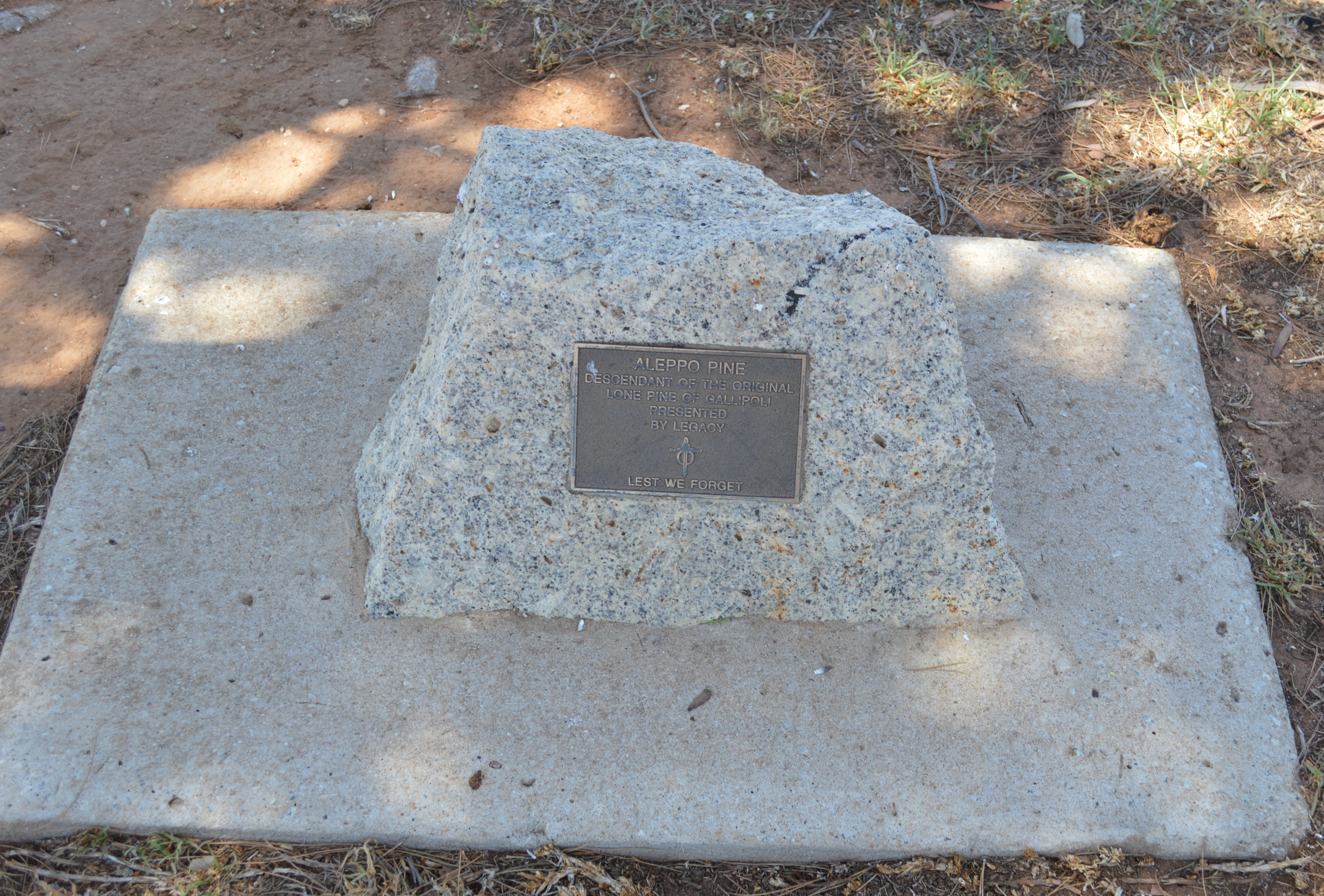

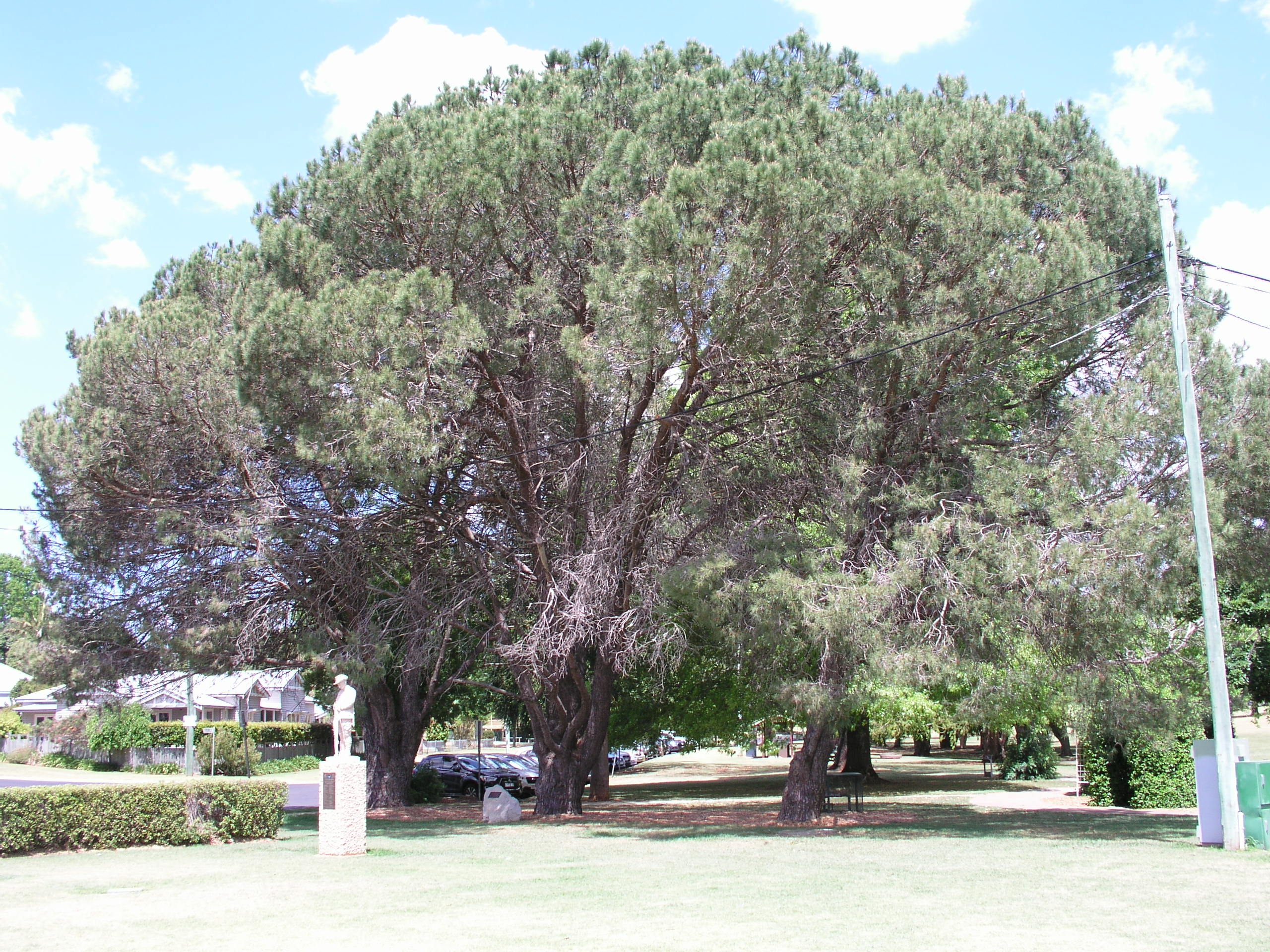
East Creek Park, Toowoomba, 25th Battalion (Australia) (Darling Downs) Memorial, Qld -
Pinus pinea

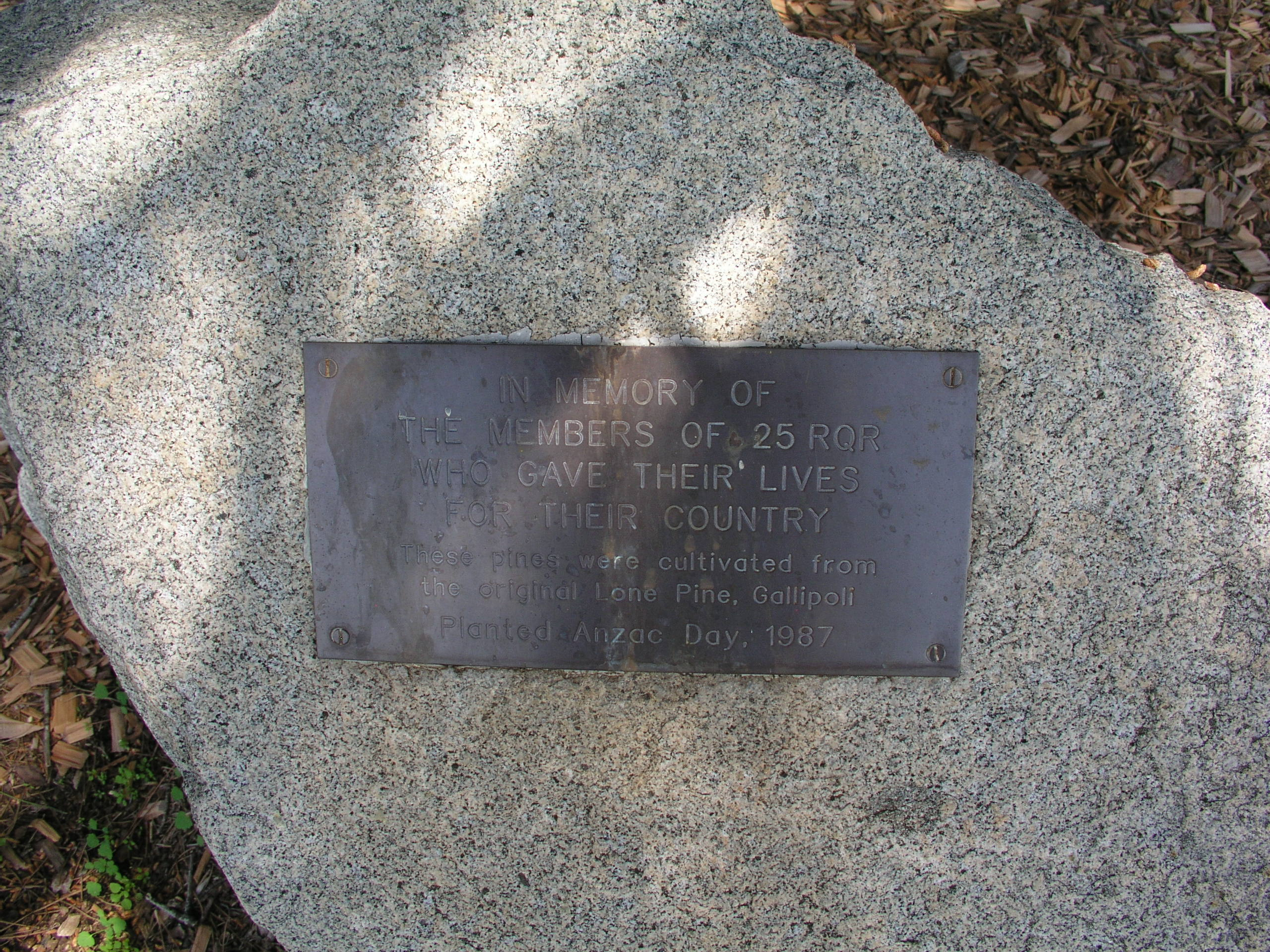

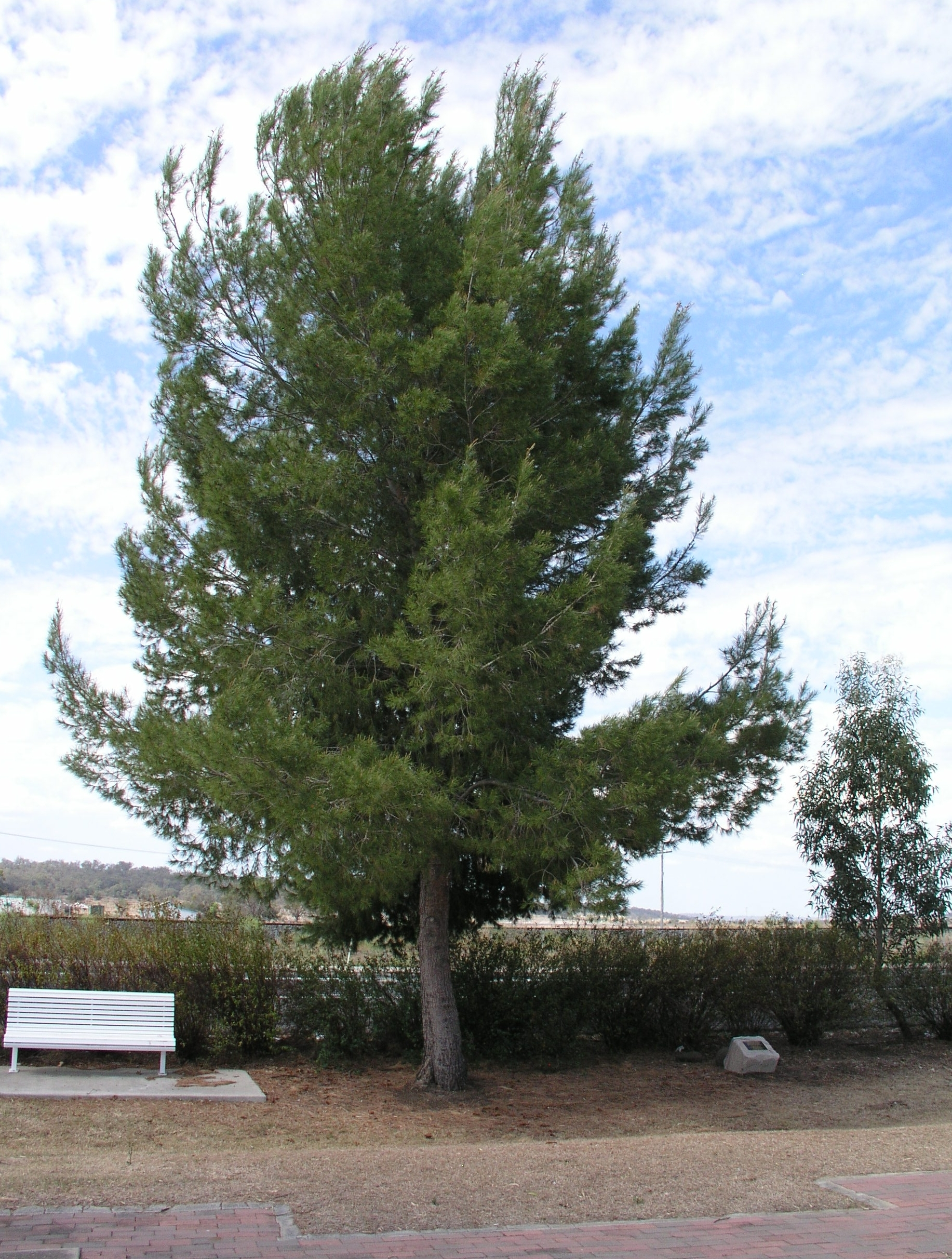
Jondaryan War Memorial, Qld. -
Pinus halepensis

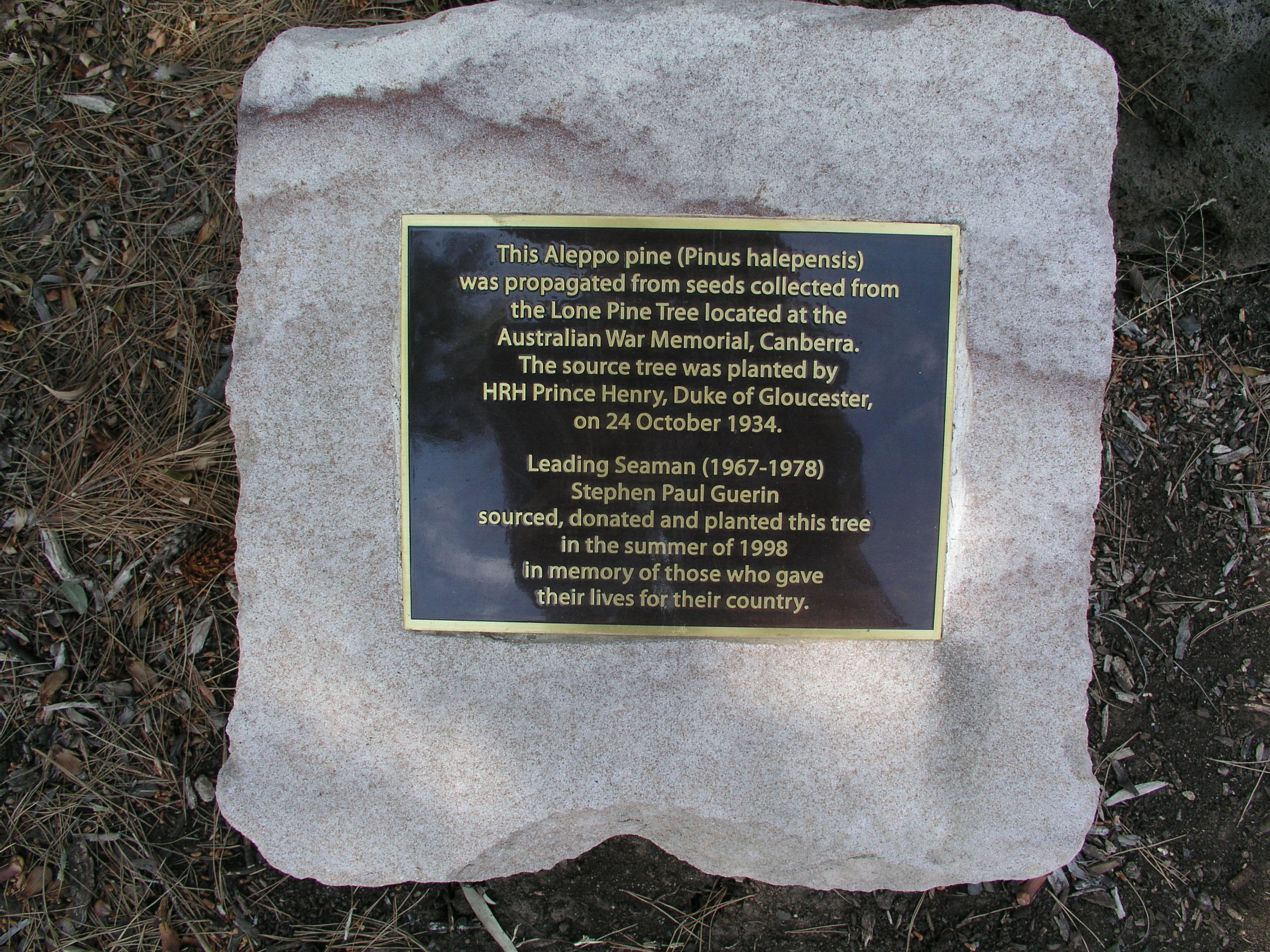

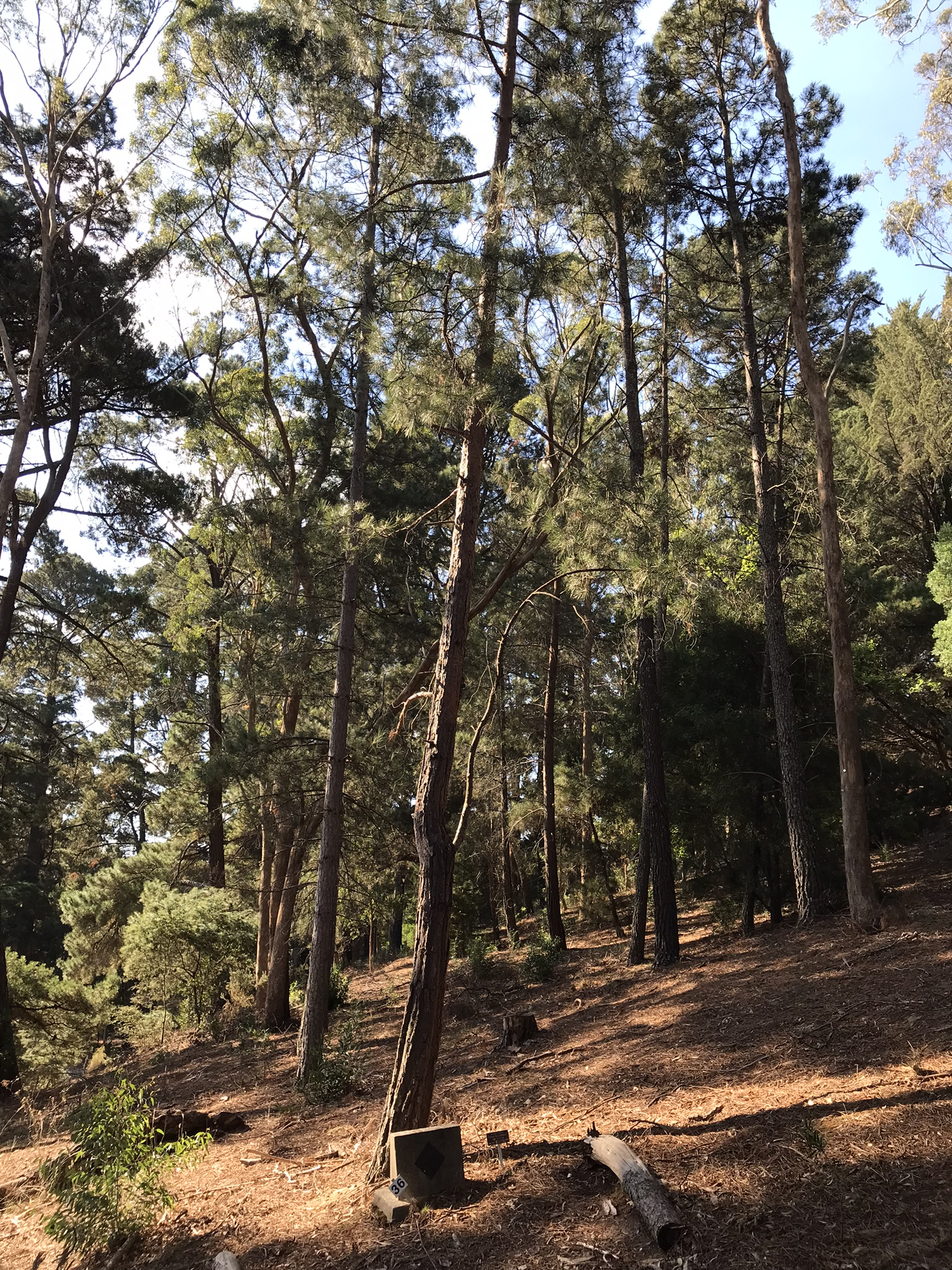
Lone Pine tree (Pinus brutia) at the Victorian School of Forestry (Creswick). Planted 1965. Crown broken in about 1976.

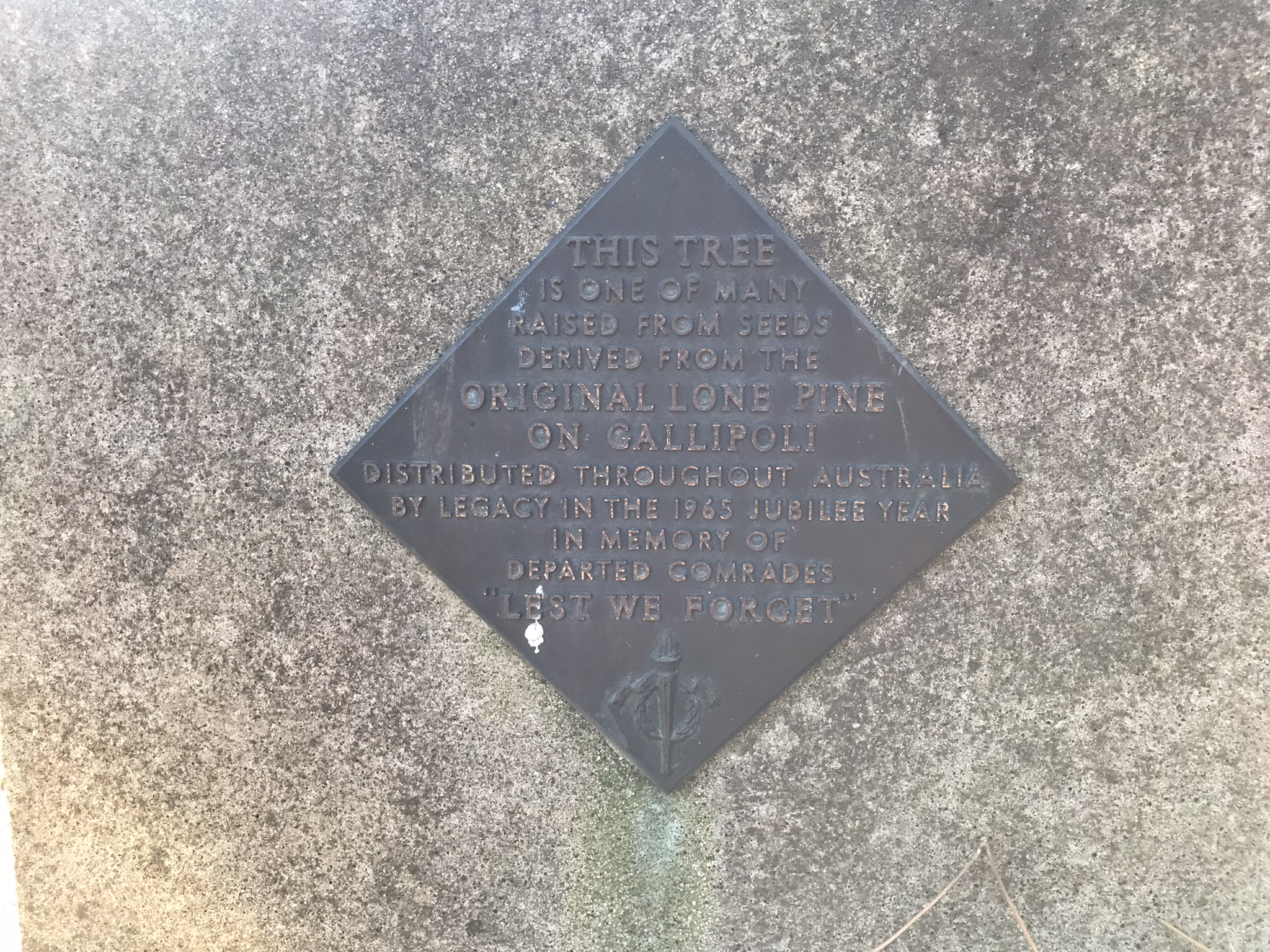
Lone Pine tree (Pinus brutia) at the Victorian School of Forestry (Creswick). Planted 1965, dedicated in 1975.

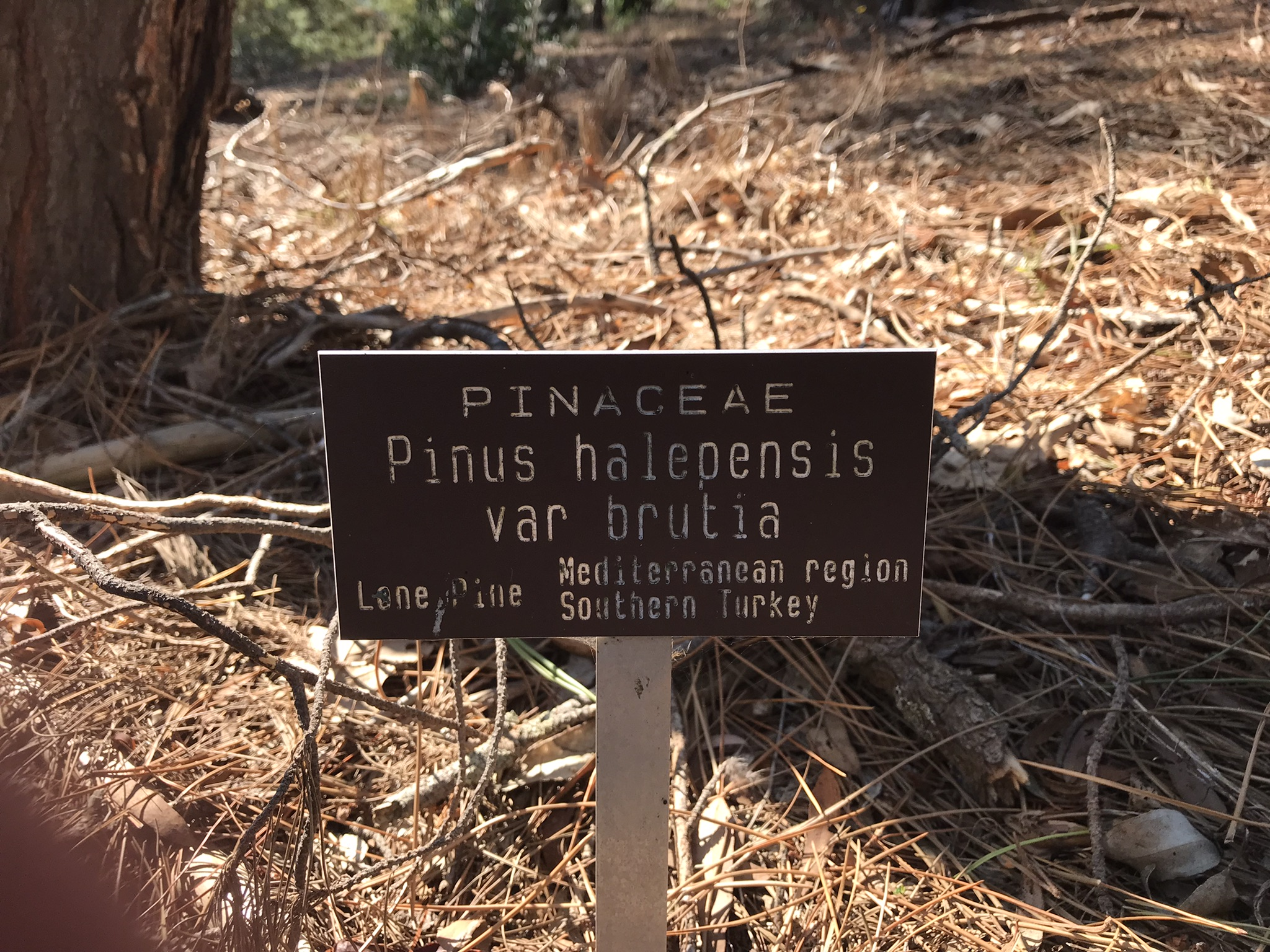
Lone Pine tree (Pinus brutia) at the Victorian School of Forestry (Creswick). Planted 1965. Pinus brutia was once considered a sub species of Pinus halepensis but is now considered by botanists to a be a species in its own right.

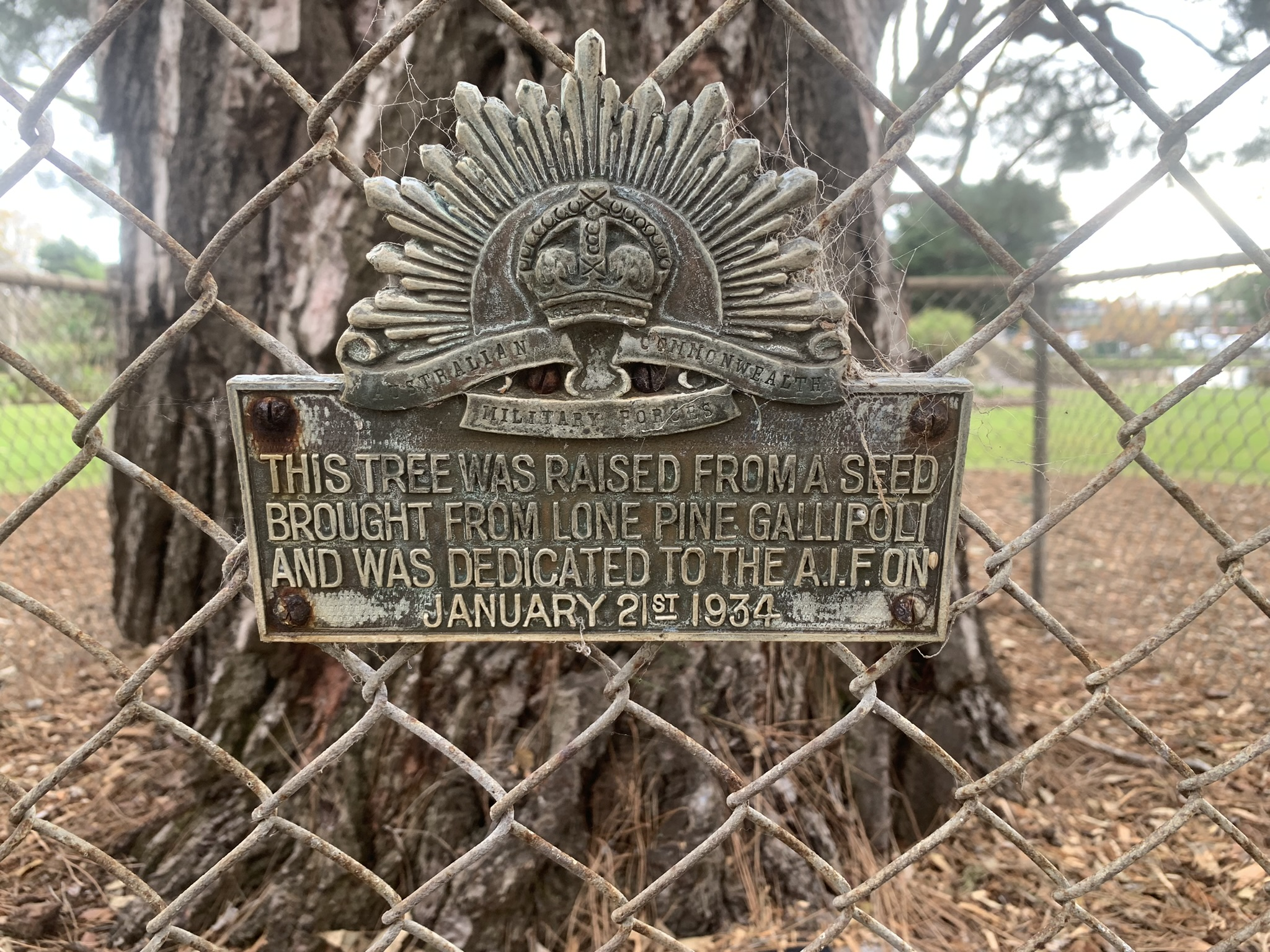
Lone Pine - Warrnambool Botanical Gardens - Plaque

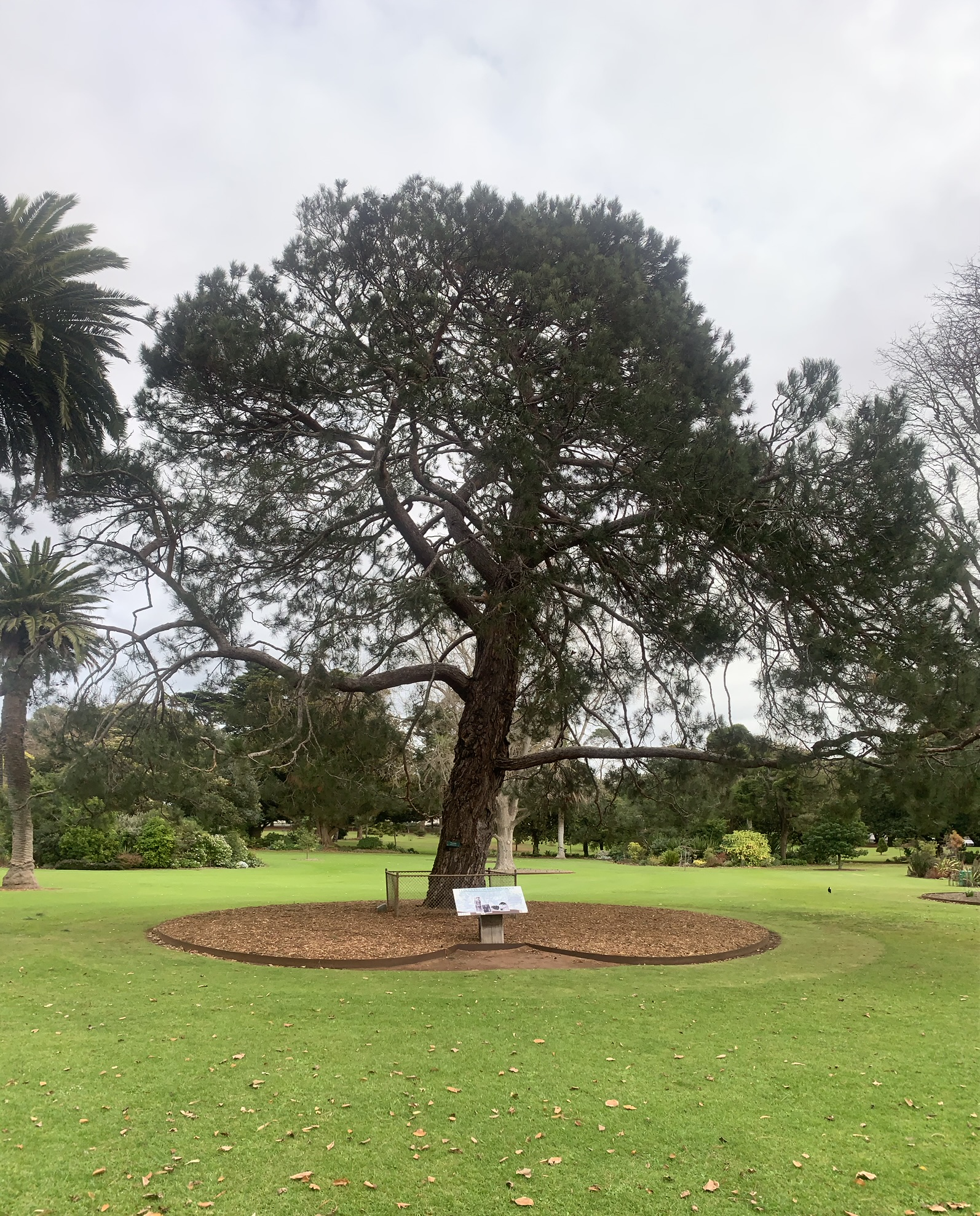
Lone Pine - Warrnambool Botanical Gardens. One of the four originals of (Pinus brutia).

== Trees in New Zealand ==
In Auckland, two trees identified as "Lone Pines" have been planted. One is a Pinus canariensis planted at Waikumete cemetery in 1961 and another is a Pinus radiata at Auckland War Memorial Museum, planted by Victoria Cross recipient Cyril Bassett on Anzac Day in 1950. A tree identified as "The Anzac Pine" stands on Te Mata Peak at Havelock North in Hawkes Bay. Although a specimen of Pinus brutia was originally planted, the current tree is identified as the species Pinus radiata. Two specimens of Pinus halepensis, planted in 1951, are located at the Lone Pine Memorial at the cemetery in Taradale, and further specimens are located at King Edward Park in Stratford and Queens Park in Whanganui. There is a "Lone Pine" at the Paeroa golf course, at the ladies tee, on the second hole. This tree appears to be New Zealand's only authentic Pinus brutia that can be traced back to the original pines, according to "Excerpts from NZ Journal of Forestry, May 2007". In Dixon Park, Greymouth, and Victoria Park, Christchurch, and the University of Canterbury, Christchurch are plaques which claim that the nearby pine tree was grown from a seedling of the Gallipoli Lone Pine.

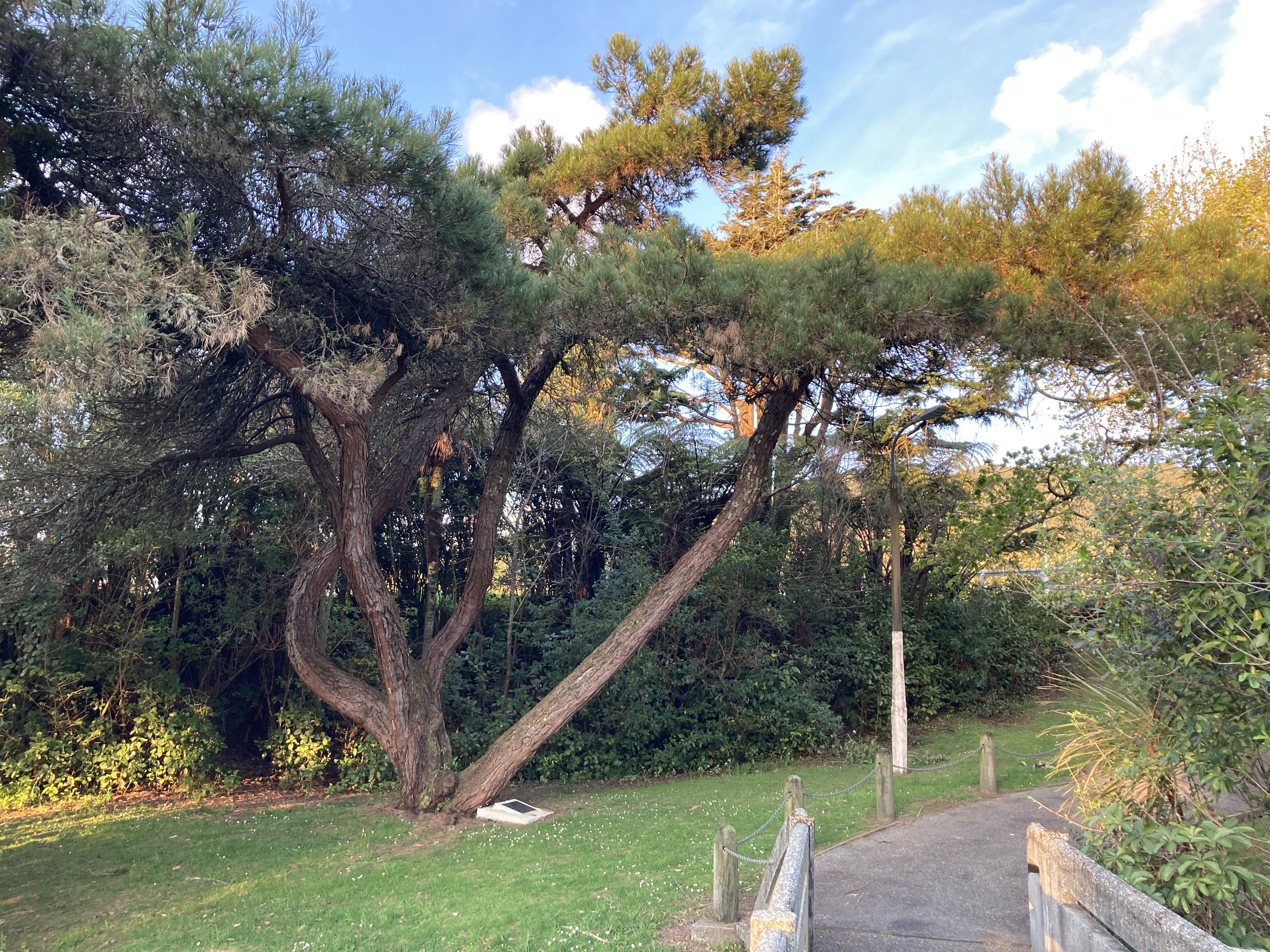
Dixon Park, Greymouth

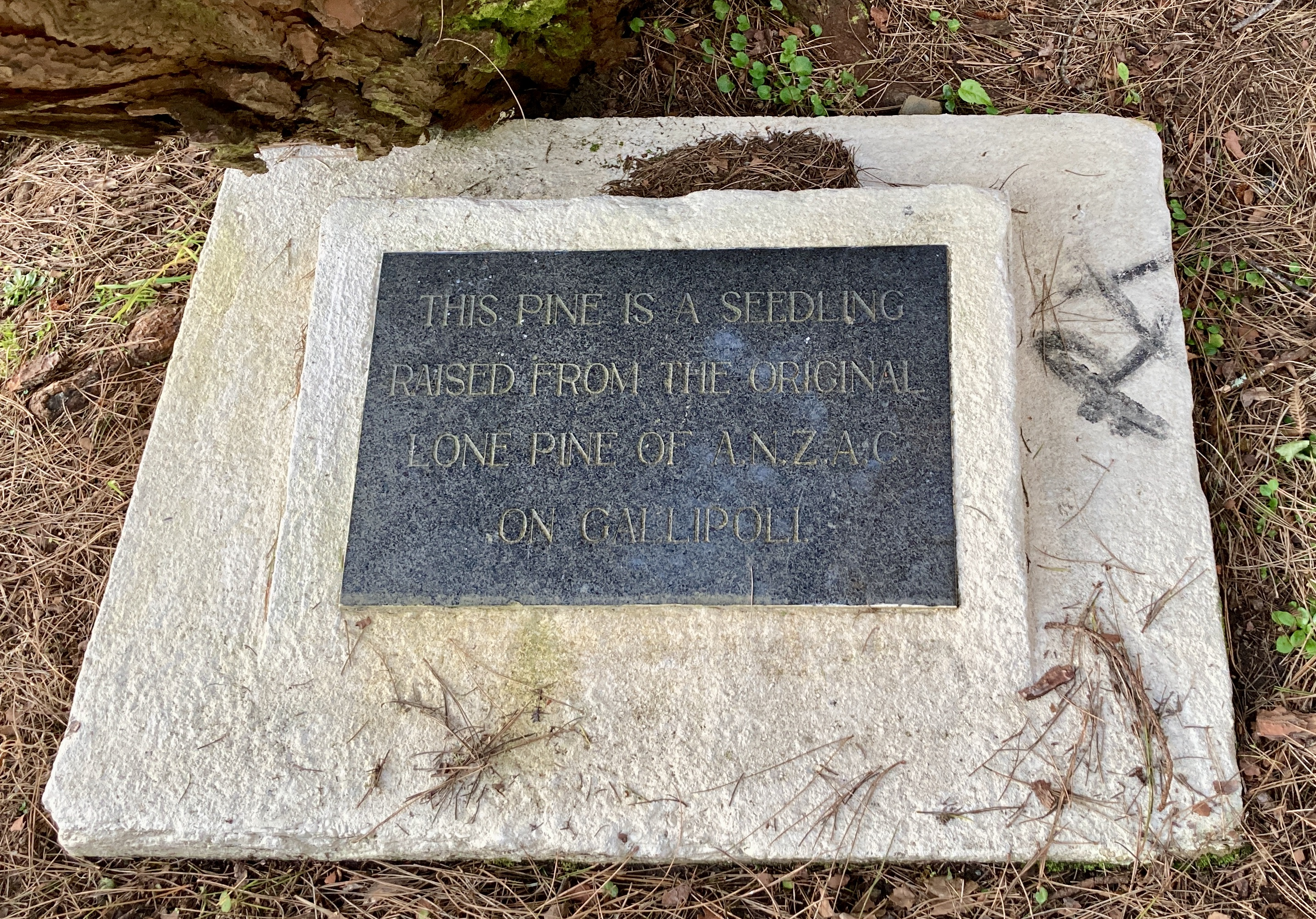

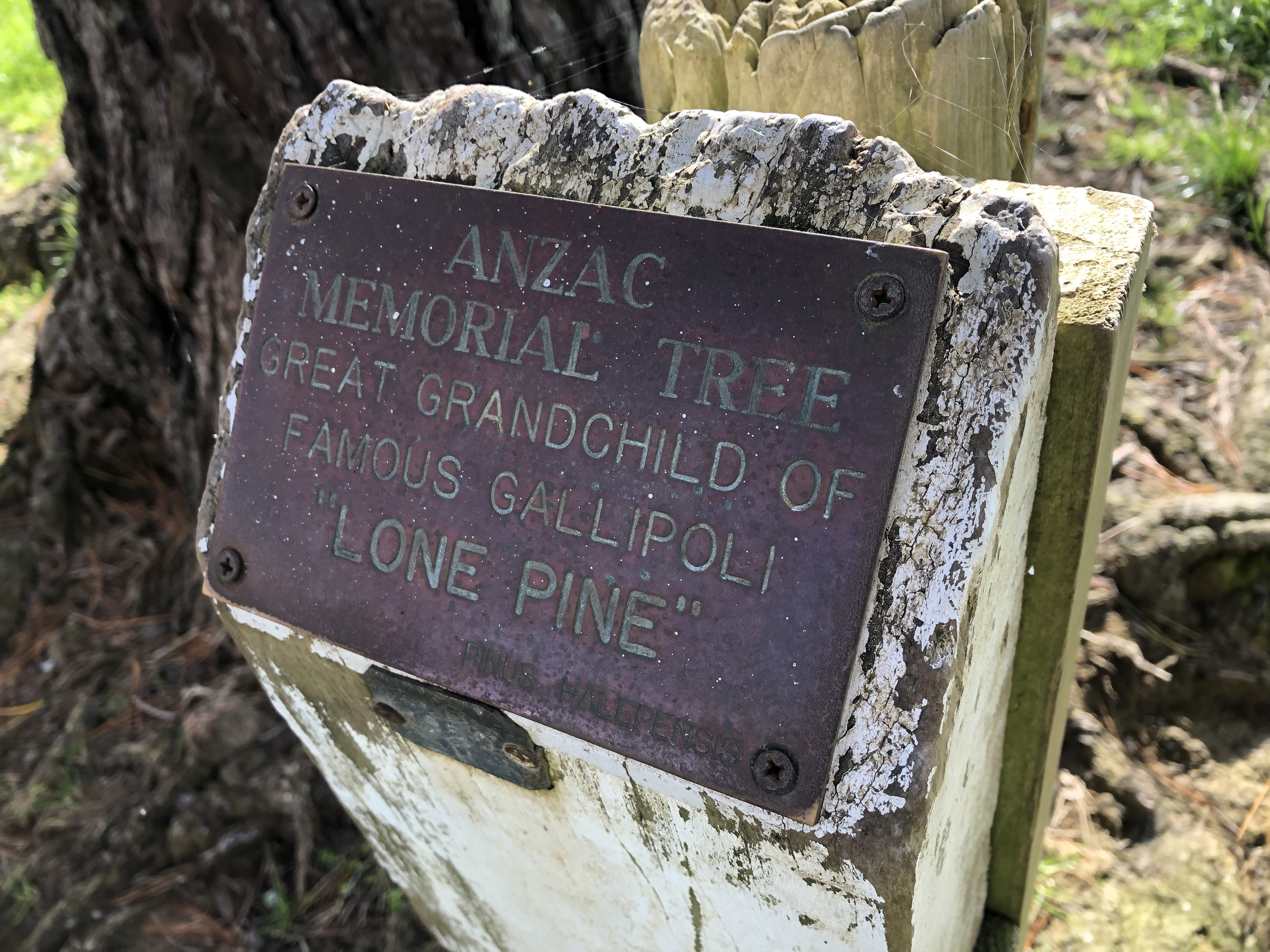
Te Mata, planted 29 September 1961

== See also ==
- List of individual trees
