= Lone Pine Cemetery =

CWGC in Gallipoli, Turkey

Lone Pine
- Commonwealth War Graves Commission
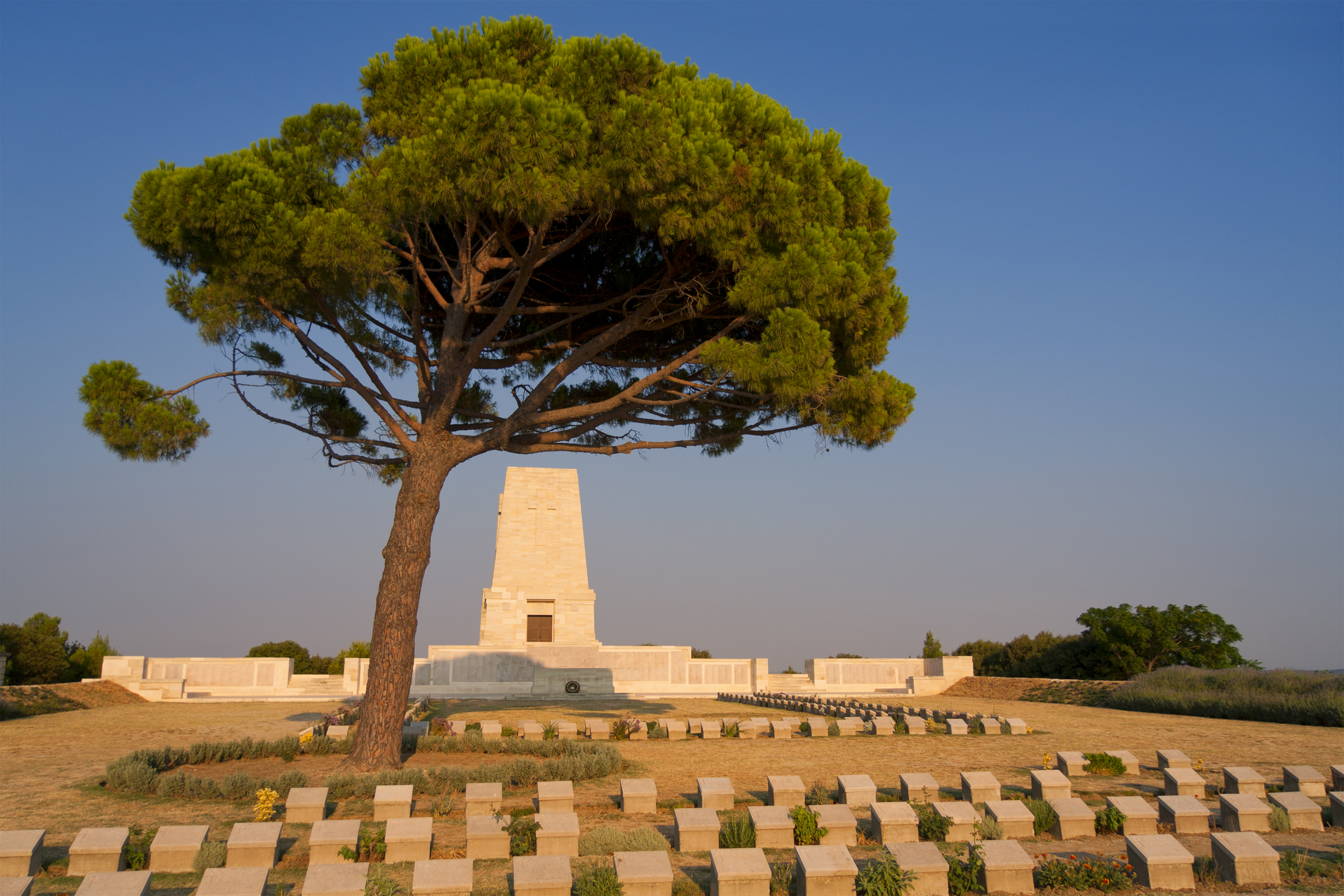
- Used for those deceased April–December 1915
- Established: 1915
- Location: 40.2307°N 26.2871°E near Gallipoli, Turkey
- Total burials: 1,167
- Unknowns: 504

Burials by nation
- Allied Powers: Australian: 471; British: 14; New Zealand: 2

Burials by war
- World War I: 1,167

Lone Pine Cemetery is a Commonwealth War Graves Commission cemetery dating from World War I in the former Anzac sector of the Gallipoli Peninsula, Turkey and the location of the Lone Pine Memorial, one of five memorials on the peninsula which commemorate servicemen of the former British Empire killed in the campaign but who have no known grave.

== Battle of Gallipoli ==
The battles at Gallipoli, some of whose participating soldiers are buried at this cemetery, was an eight-month campaign fought by Commonwealth and French forces against Ottoman Empire forces to force the Ottoman Empire out of the war. The campaign started with an attempt to force the Dardanelles using naval power, but when this failed an invasion of the peninsula was launched to assist a renewed naval assault. The invasion was unsuccessful and the allies withdrew.

The main landings were in April 1915, with primarily British and French troops landing at the tip of the peninsula around Cape Helles and Australian and New Zealand (ANZAC) troops landing a few miles north on the west coast.

Lone Pine was a plateau 120 metres (390 ft) above sea level in the southern part of the Anzac sector, which was captured on the morning of the landings, 25 April 1915, and abandoned that evening, but recaptured the following day only to be given up to the Turkish forces again that evening. The Turks retained it for the next three months, calling it Kanli Sirt (Bloody Ridge).

== Battle of Lone Pine ==
The position was recaptured by the Anzac troops on 6 August following extensive preparations (which included the digging of mines underneath it) during the Battle of Lone Pine, and held until the evacuation of the sector in December 1915.

== Cemetery ==
The cemetery was constructed during the campaign and at the end of it held 46 graves. It was greatly enlarged after the Armistice by moving isolated graves into it and by consolidating other smaller cemeteries in the area, such as Brown's Dip North and South Cemeteries.

The Lone Pine Memorial was constructed by the New Zealand Government, the 753 names on the memorial are New Zealand Soldiers, 4,934 Australian and New Zealand troops killed in the sector but who have no known grave. In addition special memorials commemorate 182 Australian and 1 British soldier thought to be buried in the cemetery but whose graves have not been identified.

== Name ==
The Anzac troops renamed the plateau, originally Plateau 400, Lonesome Pine after the single pine tree (Pinus brutia) on the plateau before the battle, and a popular song published in 1913, The Trail of the Lonesome Pine, and this name was shortened to Lone Pine. There had originally been several trees but all but one had been cut down by Turkish troops to provide wood for covering trenches. Other branches of Aleppo pine (Pinus halipensis) were brought in from beyond the Peninsula

The tree was obliterated during the fighting, but at least two Australian soldiers took cones of both Turkish pine and Aleppo pine back to Australia, from which numerous commemorative trees have since been produced.

A single pine tree was planted in the cemetery during its landscaping and enlargement in the 1920s. It is sometimes said to be a descendant of the original tree but this is not so, since it is a different species, a stone pine (Pinus pinea).

== See also ==
- List of Australian military memorials
