= Owen Jones (forester) =

Empire forester, wartime aviator

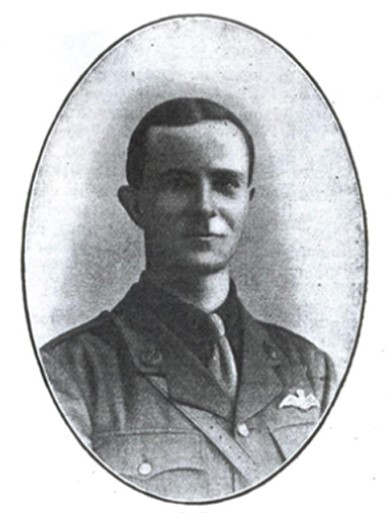
Owen Jones in his Royal Flying Corps uniform. Photograph probably taken 1917 (Source: Australian Forestry Journal circa 1920-22 via Mike Roche). FCRPA Collection.

Owen Jones (1888–1955) was an English forester, wartime aviator, foundation Chairman of the Forests Commission Victoria, conservationist and political casualty.

== Oxford ==
Owen Jones was born in 1888 at Farringdon in England, although its often reported he came from Wales.

Jones was in many ways the archetypal colonial forester. Educated at Kingswood School near Bath, he was head of the 1st XI, and the 1st XV rugby teams, and sporting achievement was taken as an indicator of teamwork and a capacity to adapt to arduous forestry work.

After winning a scholarship from the Government of Ceylon (current Sri Lanka), Jones completed a natural sciences degree at Oxford in 1910. This was followed by a Diploma of Forestry in 1911 under the famous forester Sir William Schlich.

Jones included a period of training in Germany preparing a working plan, the epitome of scientific forestry accomplishments at the time.

== Ceylon ==
Upon graduation from Oxford in 1911, through to 1916, Jones took up the role of Assistant Conservator of Forests in Ceylon (now Sri Lanka) and was part of the first cohort of professionally qualified foresters in the country.

While in Ceylon, Jones faced three major problems including reducing unsustainable levels of demand for railway sleepers and timber for public works, of ongoing forest offences and of the difficulties of gazetting areas as forest reserves.

== Royal Flying Corp ==
In February 1917, after several attempts, Jones resigned to enlist in the Royal Flying Corps as one of Britain's original "Warbirds".

After obtaining a commission in August 1917 he served overseas as a pilot with the Independent Air Force on strategic bombing raids into Germany. He was wounded and later stationed at RAF Cranwell in England as a flying instructor.

== Forests Commission Victoria ==
In December 1918, just weeks after the end of WW1, a comprehensive amendment to the Forests Act abolished the State Forest Department (SFD) and created the Forests Commission Victoria (FCV) with three Commissioners to lead a new independent organisation.

The key principals in the legislation are thought to have been derived from the earlier 1907 Act and include:

- conservation, development and utilisation of the indigenous forests, based on sound forestry principals.
- establishment of adequate exotic softwood plantations.
- prosecution of essential research work concerning the natural products of the forests.
- the need for an effective bushfire prevention and bushfire suppression organisation.

The new Commission was intended to be a “corporate and politically semi-independent body” maintained by a fixed annual grant of £40,000 from the Treasury.

Significantly, the new legislation provided for the establishment of a Forestry Fund so the Commission could raise its own revenue from timber sales and enter into loans to give it some capacity to implement its own policies and programs.

It seemed a genuine attempt by the Victorian State Government to place forestry at arms-length, on a sound long term and more scientific footing.

A worldwide search began in January 1919 for a candidate for the important new role of FCV Chairman with a salary of £1000 per year and over 100 applications were received.

With an eye to career advancement, Jones chose not to return to Ceylon after the War, and at the age of 32, applied on 3 February 1919 for the Chairmanship of the Forests Commission Victoria.

Jones was appointed after a State Cabinet Meeting on 24 June 1919, with the offer being cabled to London the next day.

On 4 July 1919, eight days after receiving notification, he married Elsie Veronica Farmer in London.

Getting a passage to Australia presented significant logistical problems in the immediate post war period but Lieutenant General Sir John Monash was confidentially approached to hold back some Australian officers to make space for the couple.

After some delays, on 20 October, Jones and his wife sailed on the Morea which arrived in Melbourne on 28 November.

Other Forests Commissioners were Hugh Robert MacKay and William James Code, with Alfred Vernon Galbraith as Secretary.

Mackay brought huge experience and had previously been a Conservator of Forests, a Senior Inspector, Secretary to the Royal Commission of 1897-1901, and had drafted the Bill on which the 1907 Act to create the State Forest Department was based.

The second position was first offered to well-known Australian Forester Charles Lane Poole but he must have turned it down and Code took the role.

Code had worked in the Forests Branch of the Lands Department before 1900 and later became Chairman in 1925 when Jones left for NZ.

Galbraith was later appointed Chairman in 1927 and remained in the position until his death in 1949.

Owen Jones first priorities as foundation Chairman of the new Forests Commission were to put the organisation on a secure commercial footing, introduce sound and sustainable forestry principals as well as securing professionally trained staff. The Victorian School of Forestry at Creswick had opened earlier in 1910.

He said:

Forests must be developed by roads, tramways or railways, they must be cultivated and improved so that their volume production reaches a higher standard, and above all, they must be so regulated as to produce constant and equal yield, so that local industries may be brought into being by the assurance of unfailing supplies. It is in this that lays the chief function of the forester.

== Otways Dispute ==
The State of Victoria at that time was a “Settler State” with an unshakable vision based on expanded pastoral farming, and where suitable land, invariably forest-covered, was in short supply and often seen as “Wastelands of the Crown”.

By the time Jones arrived in 1919 the small fraternity of foresters often clashed with the powerful Lands Department which sought to release more public land for clearing and settlement.

Politicians were vocal in their opposition to calls to reserve more forests seeing it as blocking the needs of land settlement in a post gold rush era.

The Lands Department was a dominant government organisation with alleged political affiliations to vested landholder interests inside the Parliament.

The Forest Service on the other hand was the poor cousin which struggled to combat the constant political manoeuvring to release more of Victoria’s forests for agriculture.

The Minister for Lands, David Oman, adopted a hostile anti-forestry stance by directing that in the future Lands Department officials would not consult with the Forests Commission, and they alone would judge if forest-covered land was to be selected for settlement.

Matters came to a head when in November 1923 the Minister for Lands announced a proposal to throw open for farming nearly 26,850 acres (subsequently reduced to 12,000 acres) of State forests between Apollo Bay and Hordern Vale in the densely forested Otway Ranges.

It was only saved from clearing for agriculture by the determined efforts of foresters, sawmillers, the media and the community.

The Melbourne Press, led by the Argus, Australasian, and The Age thundered that the scheme was deeply flawed and lacked due process.

In June 1925, after nearly two years of heated exchange, and in the face of so much opposition, the State Cabinet finally rejected the proposal and shelved the scheme.

The immediate aftermath of the “victory” for the Otway forests was personally distressing for Jones who was harshly criticised by some state politicians, who also urged that his salary should not be increased from £1,000 to £1,250 as proposed in the Forests Bill of 1924.

In December 1925 Jones resigned from the Commission and moved to New Zealand as a forester with a large afforestation company, New Zealand Perpetual Forests, where he bitterly attacked the Victorian State Parliament’s neglect of forestry from afar.

== New Zealand Perpetual Forests ==
Jones had been an early advocate for the value of aerial photography in forestry and of aeroplanes for firefighting. He presented a paper at the State Premiers' conference in Melbourne in 1920 titled “The possibilities of Aerial Photographic surveys for forest purposes”.

Later in New Zealand in 1937, Jones used aircraft to search for fires in plantations and direct fire-fighting efforts.

== NZ Forestry Company ==
At the outbreak of World War II Owen Jones joined the NZ Forestry Companies and was appointed Commanding Officer of the 14th Company. They joined up in England with two forestry companies raised in Australia.

However, once in England Jones sought a role that would make fuller use of his experience and forestry skills. He became a photographic interpreter for the Royal Air Force at peaceful Maidenhead on the Thames.

On his return from WW2 Jones remained dedicated to his profession and became a respected figure amongst New Zealand foresters. He was one of the foundation members of the NZ Institute of Foresters in 1928 and later established a Rotorua Branch, and in 1946–48 served as national president of the institute.

He died at Rotorua on the 7 February 1955.
