= Alfred Vernon Galbraith =

Chairman (1890–1949)

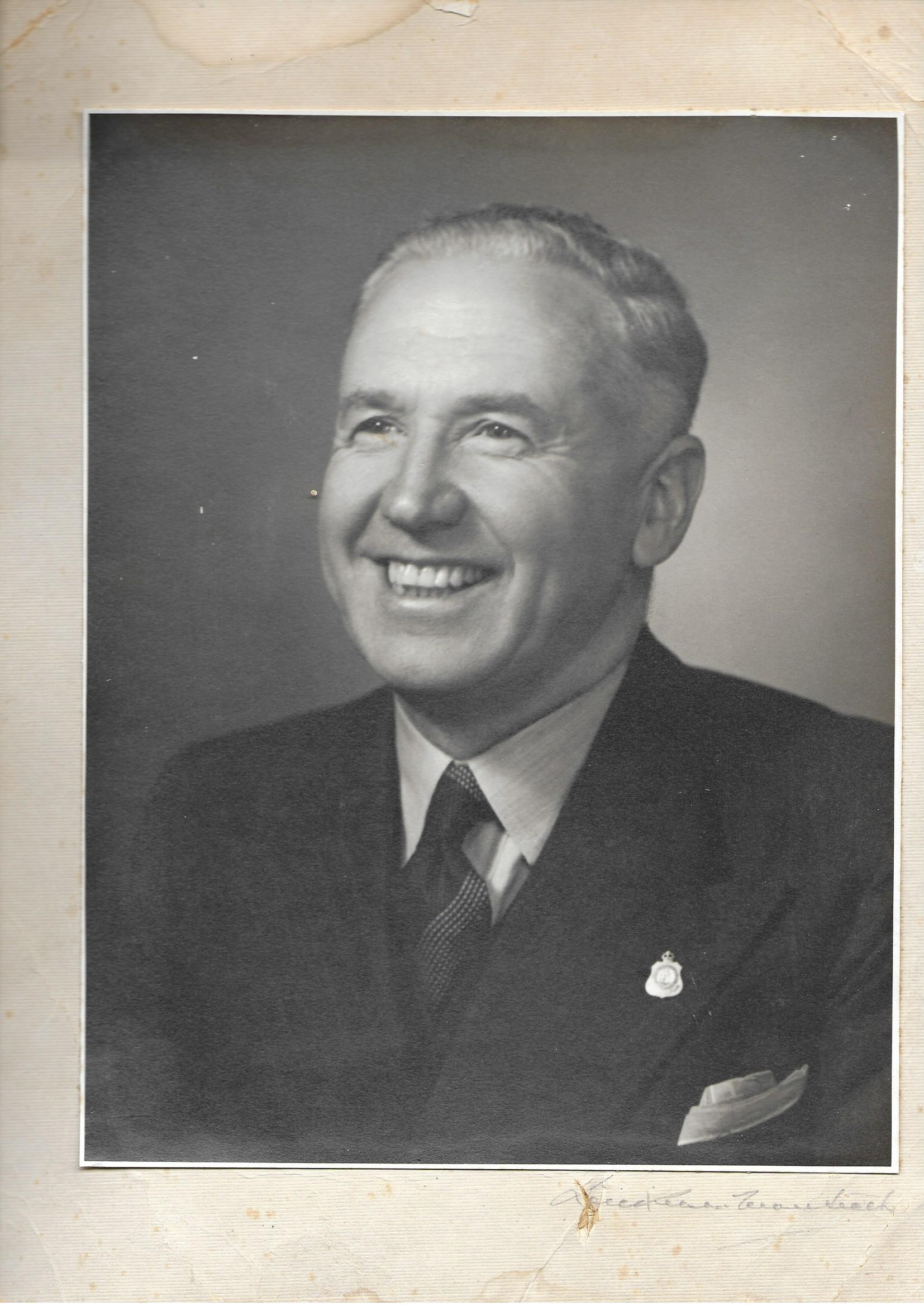
Alfred Vernon (A.V.) Galbraith. Chairman, Forests Commission Victoria. 1927-1949. Note his returned services badge. Photo circa 1940.

Alfred Vernon (A.V.) Galbraith (29 June 1890 – 29 March 1949) was a highly regarded Chairman of the Forests Commission Victoria for 22 years from 1927 until his death.

Galbraith was born at Geelong in Victoria, Australia, the only son of James Galbraith and his wife Maria. He trained as an accountant and became assistant town clerk at the City of Geelong at the age of 21 and later appointed chief clerk at the Country Roads Board.

During World War One, Galbraith enlisted in the Australian Imperial Force (AIF) in February 1916, aged nearly 26. He was appointed lieutenant in the 3 Divisional Train of the Army Service Corps and later promoted to the rank of captain in 1917. Galbraith served in both England and France but was gassed at Messines. He returned to Australia in 1919 and discharged but suffered ongoing medical problems.

== Commissioner and Chairman ==
Upon his return from military service, Galbraith was recruited as the Secretary to a newly established three-person Forests Commission Victoria (FCV) after amendments to Forest Act in December 1918. The Commission was headed by a young Welsh Forester, Owen Jones and the other commissioners included Hugh Robert Mackay and William James Code.

In September 1924 Owen Jones moved to a new position in New Zealand and Galbraith was appointed as one of three Commissioners with Code as Chairman. When Code retired in 1927, Galbraith was elevated to Chairman, a position he held until his death in 1949. During the next 22 years of Galbraith's tenure as Chairman, William Wilson Gay (ex-principal of the Victorian School of Forestry), Mr D. Ingle, Mr T. W. Newton, Mr Andrew A. Hone and Finton George Gerraty held positions as Commissioners at various times.

Although revenue from timber sales declined during the Great Depression, Galbraith channelled substantial government funds for unemployment relief works which were well suited to unskilled manual labour such as firebreak slashing, silvicultural thinning, weed spraying and rabbit control. By 1935-36 the Forests Commission was employing almost 9,000 men in relief works and a further 1,200 boys under a "Youth for Conservation Plan". Galbraith worked two prominent Melbourne businessmen and philanthropists, Herbert Robinson Brookes and George Richard Nicholas (of Aspro fame) to established the unique and enterprising “Boys Camp” at Noojee to provide particular employment and training opportunities for young people.

Under the leadership of Galbraith, the trajectory of the Forests Commission from its inception in 1918 until the beginning of the Second World War was one of periodic political conflict, varying budgets but almost continuous organisational expansion and relative autonomy.

== 1939 Bushfires ==
The Black Friday bushfires on 13 January 1939 where nearly 2 million hectares burnt, 69 sawmills were destroyed, 71 people died and several towns were entirely obliterated became a landmark in the history of the State of Victoria and a major turning point in the story of the Forests Commission. Galbraith remained Chairman throughout this difficult period and the subsequent Royal Commission headed by Judge Leonard Stretton.

The Stretton Royal Commission has been called one of the most significant inquiries in the history of Victorian public administration and its recommendations led to sweeping changes and increases in funding and responsibilities. Galbraith who survived as Chairman of the Commission was described by Judge Stretton as “a man of moral integrity” subsequently appointed Alfred Oscar Lawrence in December 1939 as the new Chief Fire Officer to lead and modernise the Forests Commission's shattered fire fighting force.

After the 1939 bushfires, Galbraith oversaw a massive timber salvage program in the Central Highlands that took nearly 15 years to complete. This operation was made more difficult due to manpower shortages during the war years combined with many FCV staff volunteering for military service with the 2/2 Forestry Company, AIF.

The war years also saw pressing needs for firewood for domestic use and charcoal as fuel for cars. Galbraith ordered the building of Kurth Kiln at Gembrook.

From its earliest days, the Commission had promoted using forest and sawmill waste for the production of wood pulp. Industry eventually began to show some interest and in 1936. Under Galbraith's Chairmanship, the Commission and Australian Paper Manufacturers Ltd (APM) reached an agreement which gave certain pulpwood rights to the company for fifty years over an area of about 200,000 ha of State forest. The Commission retained control over the pulpwood harvesting operations to ensure that pulpwood remain secondary to the use of the more valuable types of produce such as sawlogs, poles and piles, the main source being of the ash eucalypts from both mature trees and thinnings. The company proceeded to establish a plant at Maryvale in Gippsland for the manufacture of Kraft papers. It came into production in October 1939 and for some years much of its feedstock came from the 1939 fire-killed ash forest.

After the end of World War Two in 1945, Australia experienced a prolonged housing boom and a civil rehabilitation period and Galbraith increased the Commissions intake of graduates at the Victorian School of Forestry (VSF) to meet the demands on Victoria's forest resources.

== Forestry Training ==
Following the withdrawal from strained arrangements with the Australian Forestry School in Canberra in 1930 Galbraith, or A.V. as he was commonly known, personally took responsibility for raising standards at the Victorian School of Forestry (VSF) at Creswick and building closer ties with the University of Melbourne. He increased academic staff at VSF and gave the Principal Edwin James Semmens more autonomy for the management of the school and its 1200 acre demonstration forest. One major long-term consequence was more VSF graduates undertook higher training at Universities at home and abroad.

His efforts culminated in the University of Melbourne establishing a Bachelor of Science in Forestry in the mid-1940s. VSF students were then able undertake two years at the University after completing the three-year Associate Diploma course at Creswick.

Galbraith was not trained as a forester he possessed the Diploma of Commerce from Melbourne University and was an Associate of the Institute of Chartered Accountants. However, while Chairman, he wrote a major thesis “Eucalyptus regnans- Its silviculture, management & utilisation in Victoria” which he submitted in July 1935 to earn the very first Diploma of Forestry (Victoria) awarded by the Board of Forestry Education. This seminal work was later published in 1937 as a small booklet and was used to train Victorian forestry and botany students. This work was prior to the ground breaking research into mountain ash done in mid-1950s by the world renowned Dr David Hungerford Ashton from the botany school at the University of Melbourne.

== Galbraith's Grand Design ==
Within weeks of the end of the war, as Chairman of the Commission, A V Galbraith outlined his grand vision, or grand design, for the future and a quiet revolution began across Victoria’s forests.

1. Firstly, the mountain ash forests in the Central Highlands were regenerating vigorously after the 1939 bushfires and the massive salvage program was virtually complete. But these forests wouldn’t be available for timber harvesting for many decades to allow them enough time to regrow.
2. Meanwhile, the demand for hardwood timber for the post-war housing boom continued unabated.
3. The Forests Commission was under considerable pressure to identify new timber resources to replace the mountain ash lost in the 1939 fires. The alpine ash stands to the north of Heyfield and the east of Mansfield came into particularly sharp focus.
4. The silvicultural system needed to reliably ensure regeneration of alpine ash (E. delegatensis) was not well understood at the time. Pioneering research by developed harvesting techniques based on clearfalling, followed by a high intensity slash burn, and aerial sowing of seed previously stratified at low temperatures.
5. Victoria’s softwood industry was relatively modest at the time until planting expanded in1961.
6. Making their own maps of the remote forests using the aerial photographs taken by the RAAF during the war years, combined with extensive field surveys, the FCV forest assessors were producing reliable results about hardwood timber resources across eastern and north eastern Victoria.
7. Based on these new assessment figures decisions could be confidently made about the allocation of timber licences and the location of new sawmills.
8. The memory of the loss of 69 forest sawmills and 71 lives in the bushfires was still fresh. And despite strong and vocal opposition, the Forests Commission refused to allow new sawmills to be rebuilt inside the forest as they had before 1939. But those few that still existed were permitted to remain…. for a while anyway.
9. The advent of more powerful bulldozers, crawler tractors, geared haulage trucks and petrol chainsaws dramatically changed logging practices.
10. Diesel and roads were rapidly replacing steam and rails.
11. The newly built and expanded departmental road and track network made it feasible for trucks to haul logs directly from the forest to town-based sawmills within a few hours.
12. Research into kiln drying and steam reconditioning of eucalypt timber had been pioneered by the Forests Commission at its Newport seasoning works since 1911. This work together with the CSIRO bore fruit and by 1931 it was estimated that 80% of flooring laid down in Melbourne was kiln-dried mountain ash milled from the State's forests. Some of the finished timber from Newport was shipped to London to feature in Australia's High Commission building.
13. Victorian eucalypts then became highly prized for joinery and furniture and the timber industry began investing in new value-adding equipment.
14. Australian Paper Manufactures (APM) began taking pulpwood at Maryvale to make heavy-duty Kraft paper from October 1939.
15. In January 1950, a new royalty equation system was introduced that took account of the distance that logs were hauled from the forest to the sawmill, the quality and size of the logs together with the distance to central markets in Melbourne. It was intended to be simple and equitable and reduce wastage.

Undoubtedly, the main social and economic beneficiaries of Galbraith’s’ Grand Design were small rural settlements like Heyfield, Mansfield, Myrtleford, Bruthen, Orbost, Cann River, Colac, Alexandra and Swifts Creek which grew into thriving communities based upon the timber industry.

These became flourishing “Timber Towns” with jobs, decent housing, schools, shops, sporting clubs, public transport and health care. A more secure and safer place for families than the previous itinerant sawmills set deep in the bush which was characteristic of the earlier period.

Galbraith was also widely known throughout Australia and overseas. He took a leading role in organising the 1928 British Empire Forestry Conference in Australia and represented Victoria at a similar conference in 1935. He planned to attend the 1947 conference in England but was forced to withdraw due to failing health.

Alfred Vernon Galbraith died 29 March 1949, while still Chairman of the Forests Commission, aged 58. Later in April 1949, Finton George Gerraty who began his forestry career at Creswick in 1915 was appointed as the new Chairman and had the job to implement Galbraith's grand vision.

Among his many legacies, the new student accommodation block, AVG House, at the Victorian School of Forestry was named in his honour in 1961.
