= Semmens =

Semmens is a surname. Notable people with the surname include:

- Dean Semmens (born 1979), Australian water polo player
- Edwin James Semmens (1886–1980), principal of Victorian School of Forestry, Australia
- Robert Semmens (born 1961), Australian rules footballer
