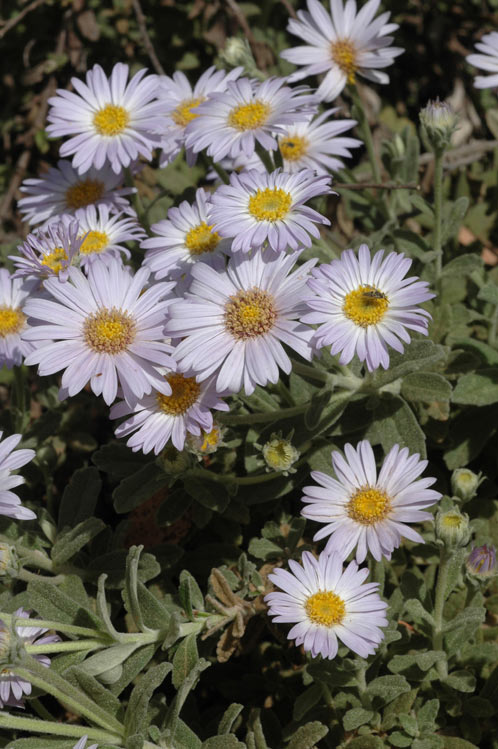
- In the Australian National Botanic Gardens

Scientific classification
- Kingdom: Plantae
- Clade: Tracheophytes
- Clade: Angiosperms
- Clade: Eudicots
- Clade: Asterids
- Order: Asterales
- Family: Asteraceae
- Genus: Olearia
- Species: O. frostii

Binomial name
- Olearia frostii (F.Muell.) J.H.Willis

Synonyms
- Aster frostii F.Muell.; Olearia stellulata var. frostii (F.Muell.) Ewart

= Olearia frostii =

Species of shrub

Olearia frostii, commonly known as Bogong daisy-bush, is a species of flowering plant in the family Asteraceae and is endemic to Victoria in Australia. It is a low, often straggling shrub with egg-shaped leaves with the narrower end towards the base, and mauve to pink and yellow, daisy-like inflorescences.

== Description ==
Olearia frostii is a greyish, often straggling shrub that typically grows to a height of up to 40 cm (16 in), its branchlets densely covered with star-shaped hairs. Its leaves are arranged alternately along the branchlets, more or less sessile, narrowly egg-shaped with the narrower end towards the base, 8–30 mm (0.31–1.18 in) long and 5–13 mm (0.20–0.51 in) wide. The upper surface of the leaves is covered with greyish, star-shaped hairs and the lower surface densely covered with woolly, star-shaped hairs. The heads or daisy-like "flowers" are arranged singly on the ends of a few branches, and are 25–50 mm (0.98–1.97 in) in diameter on a peduncle mostly 30–100 mm (1.2–3.9 in) long with three to five rows of bracts at the base. Each head has 30 to 80 mauve to pink ray florets, the ligules 8–15 mm (0.31–0.59 in) long, surrounding 40 to 100 yellow disc florets. Flowering occurs from January to March and the fruit is a glabrous achene, the pappus 5–7 mm (0.20–0.28 in) long.

== Taxonomy ==
Bogong daisy-bush was first formally described in 1889 by Ferdinand von Mueller who gave it the name Aster frostii in The Victorian Naturalist from specimens collect on "Mount Hotham, at an elevation of about 6,000 ft (1,800 m)". In 1956, James Hamlyn Willis changed the name to Olearia frostii in the journal Muelleria.

== Distribution and habitat ==
Olearia frostii grows in heath, grassland and woodland on the Bogong High Plains and nearby peaks in north-eastern Victoria.
