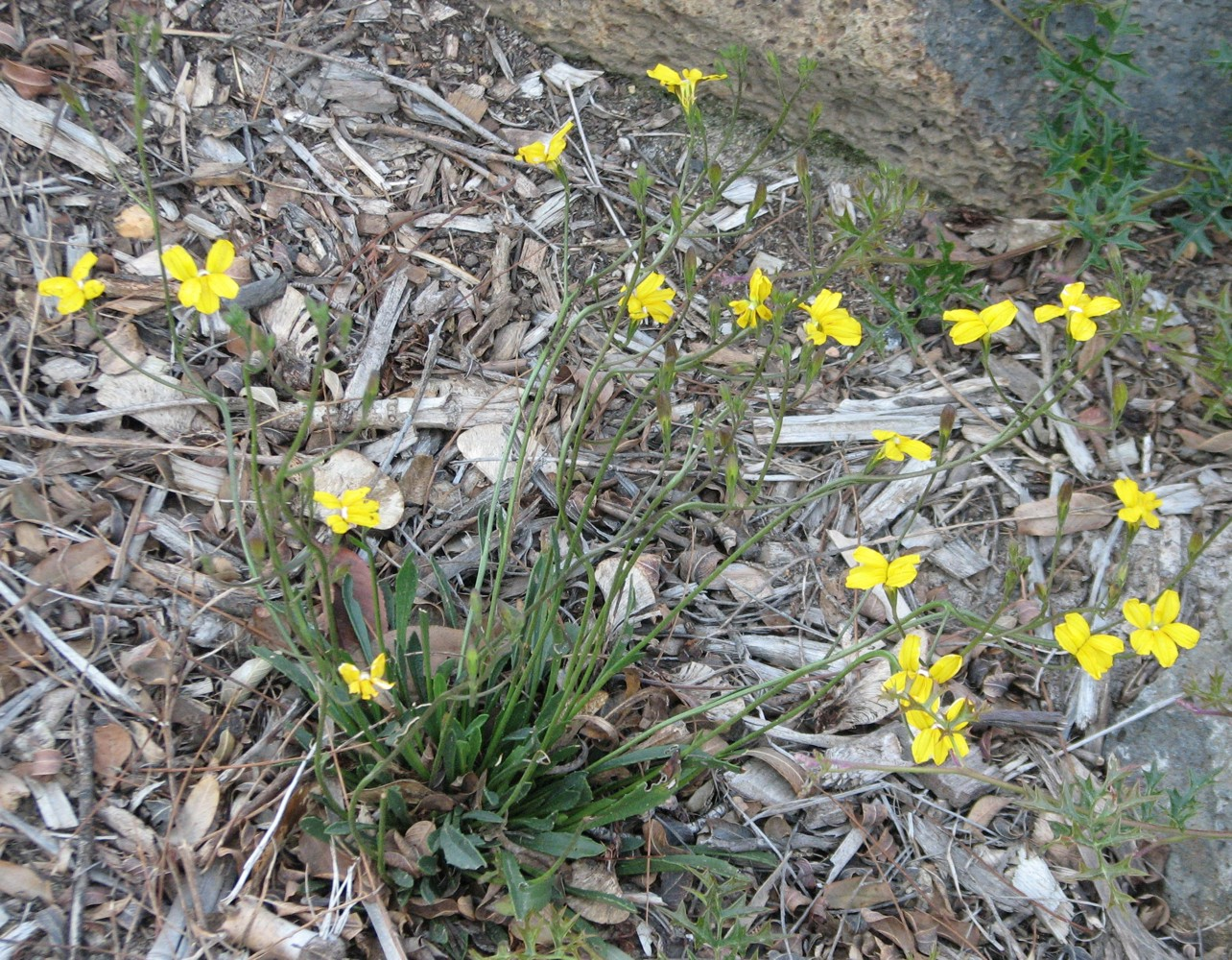
- In the Royal Botanic Gardens, Melbourne

Scientific classification
- Kingdom: Plantae
- Clade: Tracheophytes
- Clade: Angiosperms
- Clade: Eudicots
- Clade: Asterids
- Order: Asterales
- Family: Goodeniaceae
- Genus: Goodenia
- Species: G. lineata

Binomial name
- Goodenia lineata J.H.Willis

= Goodenia lineata =

Grampians goodenia

Species of flowering plant

Goodenia lineata, commonly known as Grampians goodenia, is a species of flowering plant in the family Goodeniaceae and is endemic to the Grampians in Victoria. It is an erect perennial herb with lance-shaped, more or less toothed leaves with the narrower end towards the base and racemes of yellow flowers.

== Description ==
Goodenia lineata is an erect perennial herb that typically grows to a height of up to 50 cm (20 in). The leaves are lance-shaped with the narrower end towards the base, 30–80 mm (1.2–3.1 in) long and 3–9 mm (0.12–0.35 in) wide, with more or less toothed edges and mostly arranged at the base of the plant. The flowers are arranged small numbers in racemes up to 200 mm (7.9 in) long on a peduncle 40–80 mm (1.6–3.1 in) long. Each flower is on a pedicel 40–80 mm (1.6–3.1 in) long and there are linear bracts 3–9 mm (0.12–0.35 in) long and triangular bracteoles 3–4 mm (0.12–0.16 in) long. The sepals are lance-shaped, 4–7 mm (0.16–0.28 in) long and the corolla is yellow and about 20 mm (0.79 in) long. The lower lobes of the corolla are 8–10 mm (0.31–0.39 in) long with wings about 2 mm (0.079 in) wide. Flowering mainly occurs from November to February but fruit and seeds have not been recorded.

== Taxonomy ==
Goodenia lineata was first formally described by botanist Jim Willis in 1967 in the journal Muelleria. The type specimen was collected by Willis at the summit of Mount William. The specific epithet (lineata) means "marked with straight lines", referring to "the boldly striped lower half of the corolla".

== Distribution and habitat ==
Grampians goodenia grows in heath and is restricted to the Grampians of Victoria.

== Conservation status ==
The species is listed as "vulnerable" under the Victorian Government Flora and Fauna Guarantee Act 1988.
