= Edwin James Semmens =

Australian historian (1886-1980)

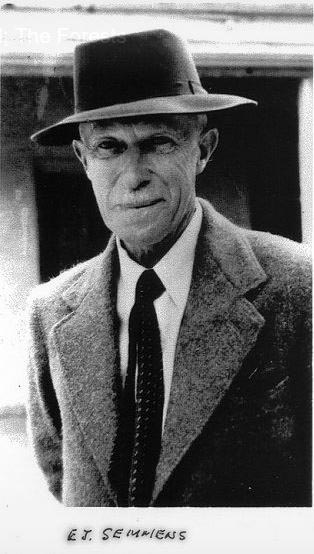
- Edwin James (E.J.) Semmens - Principal - Victorian School of Forestry, 1928-1951
- Born: 20 January 1886; Toongabbie, Victoria, Australia
- Died: 31 December 1980 (aged 94); Creswick, Victoria, Australia
- Education: Melbourne Teachers College; University of Melbourne
- Occupations: Schoolteacher; Historian
- Parents: Josiah Semmens (father); Agnes Veitch (mother)

Edwin James Semmens, MBE was the Principal of the Victorian School of Forestry (VSF) at Creswick, Victoria, Australia for 23 years from 1928 to 1951; a local historian and a community leader.

Edwin was born on 20 January 1886 at the small Gippsland township of Toongabbie in eastern Victoria, as the eldest of nine children of Josiah Semmens, and his wife Agnes, née Veitch.

His father Josiah, worked as an Inspector of Forests in the Lands Department at the time and the family moved at some stage to Maryborough in northwest Victoria where Edwin attended elementary school and later the nearby Bendigo School of Mines.

Edwin started his career as a primary school teacher in 1902 and attended the Melbourne Teachers College. During 1925, he undertook more part-time study at the University of Melbourne towards a Bachelor of Science where he won the prestigious Godfrey Howitt prize with exhibitions in botany and zoology.

Later in 1927, while teaching at Shepparton High School, he was invited by the Forests Commission Victoria to become Principal of the Victorian School of Forestry at Creswick when the institution was going through a difficult period and was in danger of closing.

== Principal of the Victorian School of Forestry 1928-1951 ==
Known fondly to his students as E.J. or Teddo, he immediately introduced a new and broad curriculum of subjects and set high personal standards. The academic rigour of the course was ensured by a Board of Examiners headed by the Professor of Botany at the University of Melbourne, Professor Alfred James Ewart (1872–1937). Semmens had studied under Ewart at University and its believed that Ewart put Semmens name forward to the Forests Commission as candidate for Principal of VSF in 1927. Semmens also enjoyed strong support from the Chairman of the Forests Commission, Alfred Vernon Galbraith after the acrimonious split between Victoria and the Australian Forestry School in Canberra in 1930.

E.J generously made himself available to guide his pupil's study and sporting habits and also cultivate their diverse interests. Many of his students later established themselves as notable leaders with the Forests Commission after graduating from VSF. Two students, James Hamlin Willis, and Richard Bond became outstanding botanists, while many others established prominent careers within the National Parks Service, Fisheries and Wildlife, Soil Conservation Authority, teaching at tertiary institutions or the private forestry sector. Some like Alfred John Leslie became truly international foresters.

An active field-botanist himself, Semmens accumulated a large and valuable collection of plant specimens and personal sketches for the expanding school herbarium, and was elected a Fellow honoris causa of the prestigious Linnean Society of London (FLS) in 1935 for his work. He also conducted research into the composition of eucalyptus oils. His steam kilns are part the University of Melbourne museum collection at Creswick.

Semmens retired after 23 years as Principal of the Victorian School of Forestry at the end of 1951, aged 65 . Francis (Frank) Robert Moulds then replaced Semmens as the Principal until the end of 1956.

== Local historian and community leader ==
During the 1940s and 50s, Semmens collected an eclectic range of materials relating to his local region. He later donated some of his collection of early documents, photos, paintings and artefacts to the Creswick museum which he helped establish, but the bulk of his collection was bequeathed to the University of Melbourne Archives. The collection has been described as "one of the most important collections of local history source material assembled in Australia".

Semmens was active in his local community, working not only to establish the fledgling Creswick Museum, but presiding over the Creswick District Hospital between 1948 and 1951, as well as serving 24 years as a councillor of the Shire of Creswick (1951–75), with a stint at Shire President in 1956.

On 8 June 1968, Edwin James Semmens was honoured in the Queen's Birthday List with a Member of the Order of the British Empire (MBE) for services to local government.

Later in 1977, in recognition of his outstanding and lasting legacy to forestry and local history, the University of Melbourne conferred a Doctorate of Forest Science honoris causa. A new accommodation block at the forestry school was named in his honour.

He died on 31 December 1980, aged 92.
