= Victorian School of Forestry =

Coordinates: 37°25′20″S 143°53′56″E

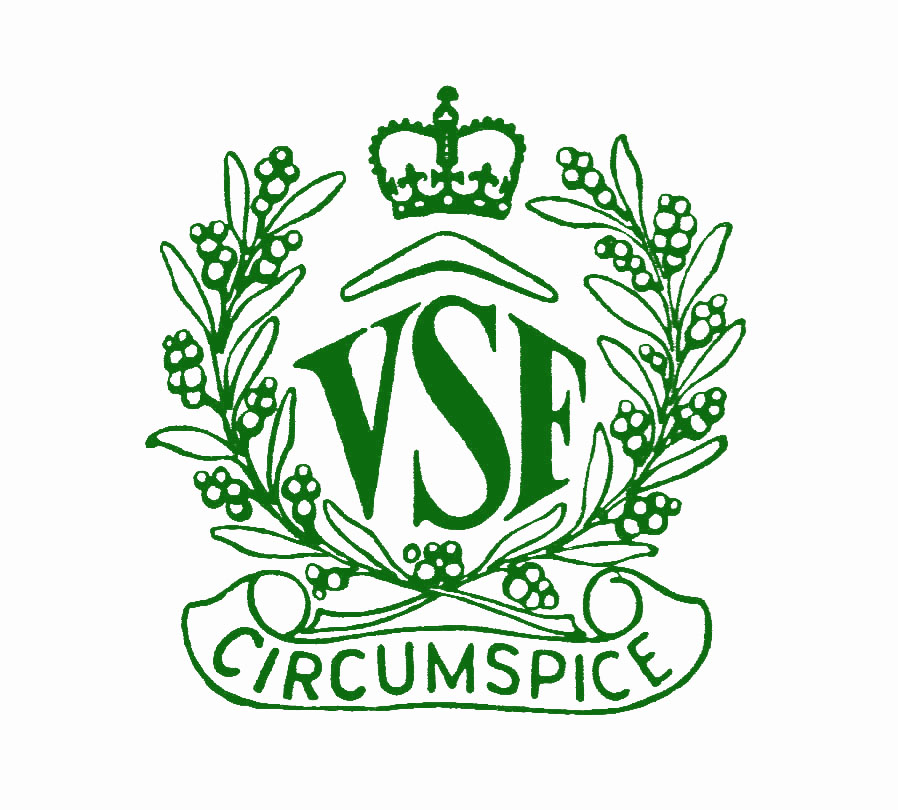
- Creswick; Victoria; Australia

Information
- Other name: School of Ecosystem and Forest Sciences
- Motto: Circumspice - to look around you
- Established: 1910
- Founder: Forests Commission Victoria
- Closed: 1980 - Merged with University of Melbourne

The Victorian School of Forestry (VSF) was established in October 1910 at Creswick, in the Australian state of Victoria. It was located at the former Creswick Hospital, built in 1863 during the gold rush. The creation of VSF was one of the many recommendations of a Royal Commission held between 1897 and 1901 into forest degradation. The first tertiary forestry school in Australia, VSF was administered by the Forests Commission Victoria (FCV) until 1980, when VSF amalgamated with the University of Melbourne to become that institution's School of Ecosystem and Forest Sciences. From 1910 to 1980, 522 students completed the Diploma of Forestry at VSF.

== History ==
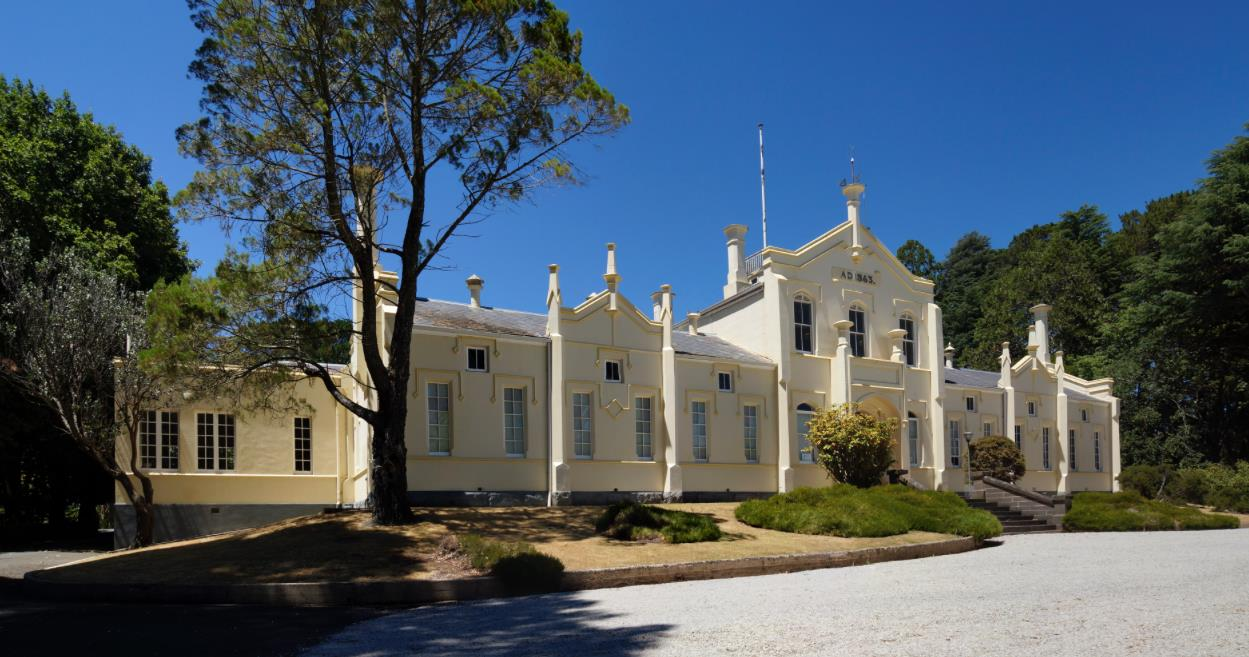
The Victorian School of Forestry was established in 1910 at the former Creswick Hospital which was built in 1863.

The supply of professional staff was a paramount concern to Conservators of the early State Forests Department in Victoria.

Forestry training really began with the idea expressed by Conservator Frederick D'A. Vincent from the Imperial Forest Service in India after his inspection of Victorian forestry in 1887. It was then reiterated by George Samuel Perrin, the first Conservator of Forests, in 1890, that a training school was necessary because overseas forestry staff, if available, could not "adapt themselves to the new and strange conditions of forestry in this country". His suggestion was supported by numerous reports and inquiries.

The new Forest Act (1907) also recognised that effective management of forests required appropriately skilled staff, stipulating that no person could be appointed to a forestry position without completing a relevant course and passing a special examination, thus paving the way for the establishment of the forestry school at Creswick.

The Victorian School of Forestry (VSF), also known locally as "The School on the Hill", was located at the former Creswick hospital which was built in 1863. The buildings and grounds were purchased for £1,163 7s 3d in 1909 by the Victorian Government and refurbished at the instigation of John Johnstone, (Superintendent of State Plantations), the direction of Donald McLeod, (Minister of Forests, 1904–1909) together with Sir Peter McBride (Minister of Forests, 1909–1913) and the support of Sir Alexander Peacock, who was then the parliamentary representative for the seat of Creswick and later Premier of Victoria. The school's main gates were dedicated to Sir Alexander in 1952.

The State Government opened the school on 29 October 1910, attended by a large delegation of dignitaries, Members of the Victorian Parliament, and their companions. The visitors toured the School, nursery, plantation and proposed Arboretum, and toasted the great endeavour.

The Victorian School of Forestry was the first institution of its kind in Australia.

VSF was a residential school having the old hospital wards available as classrooms, well equipped kitchen and nurses quarters and other rooms suitable for staff and student accommodation. Originally called "Pednolva" school classes began in the house built in 1881 for Dr John Tremearne, who had been the resident medical officer at the Creswick Hospital from 1872 to 1888, but later moved up the hill to the old hospital building.

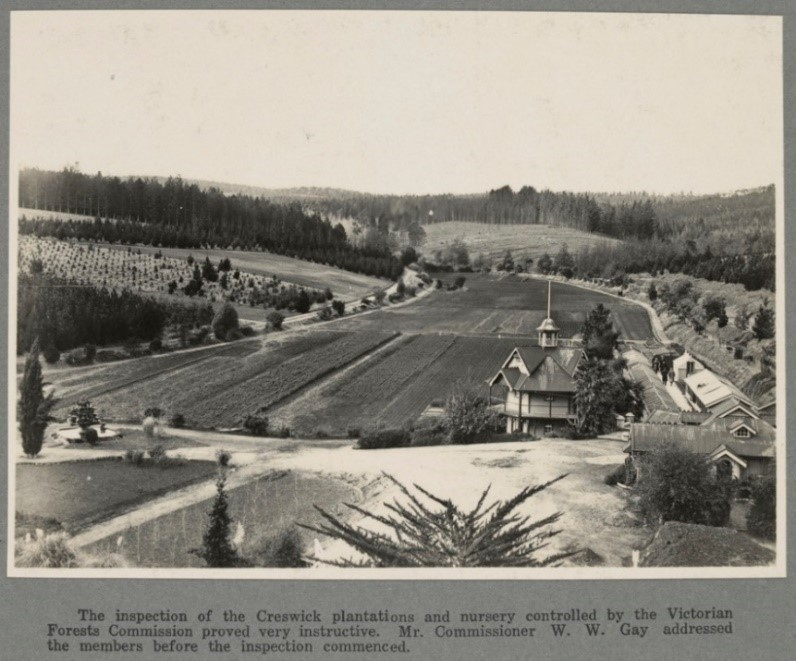

The forests surrounding Creswick had been thoroughly cut over during the gold mining era from the 1850s until around 1900. The forester John La Gerche was placed in charge of the forest land around Creswick in the late 1880s. He established a State nursery at nearby Sawpit Gully in 1888 to aid the revegetation of the forests around Creswick. Land rehabilitation and the need to create softwood resources meant that some of the first plantations of radiata pine were established around 1900 and became part of the school demonstration forest. In the early years, practical training was completed under the direction of John Johnstone, Superintendent of State Plantations. Johnstone was born in Scotland in 1858 and served his gardening and forestry apprenticeship at Gordon Castle, and after getting married decided to emigrate to Victoria. He worked to establish Maddingley Park at Bacchus Marsh before being recruited to the Forests Department in 1898 by George Samuel Perrin. The School lacked trained foresters to teach specialised coursework, so teachers were recruited from the nearby Ballarat School of Mines who focussed solely on basic sciences. Mr Thomas Stephan Hart, formerly Professor of Geology and Mining, was appointed Senior Master in May 1913. The academic standard of the course was ensured by a Board of Examiners headed by the Professor of Botany at Melbourne University, Professor Alfred James Ewart (1872–1937).

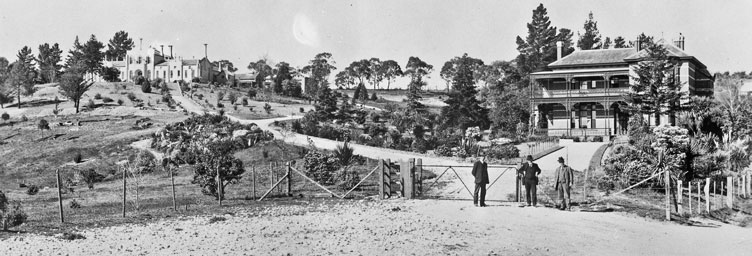
"The School on the Hill" - Tremearne House and the old Creswick hospital building. Photo - 1915. Thomas Hart centre. Source: FCRPA.

The initial class of six students that commenced in October 1910 were already in training as foresters under a system of supervised practical work or were appointed from work crews. Entrance to the school was by competitive examination for boys between fourteen and sixteen years of sound health and good moral character. The school was later officially opened at a ceremony on 26 May 1913 by Hugh Mackay, Conservator of Forests.

Regulations were gazetted in September 1914 to enable trainees at the school to be paid £48 in their first year, £52 in the second year and £56 in the third, with £45 being deducted to cover board, lodging and tuition. Upon graduation, students were appointed as cadet foresters to the Forests Commission Victoria.

In 1914, the British Association met in Australia and among the many distinguished visitors was Sir David Ernest Hutchins, a graduate of the École nationale des eaux et forêts at Nancy in France. Hutchins was then retired, but with considerable experience across the British Empire in both India and South Africa. Australia's first Inspector-General of Forests Charles Edward Lane Poole also an alma mater of the French forestry school, invited Hutchins to tour all Australian States and New Zealand. Hutchins reported in 1916 on the overall parlous state of forest management but wrote enthusiastically about both Victoria and the progress being made at the Forestry School.

Nine VSF students are known to have enlisted in the Great War and one of the first graduates of the school, Reginald Graham Lindsay, (brother of famous Australian artist and writer, Norman Lindsay), joined 22nd Australian Field Artillery Brigade but was killed in action in France on 31 December 1916. Reg was queuing with four other soldiers for rations when they were all killed by a direct shell landing in their midst, although it is often more colourfully reported that he was shot "when dashing out of his dugout to rescue a bottle of rum" on New Year's Eve.

A number of VSF graduates volunteered for military service in WW2 with some joining units deployed to the UK and other places as forestry companies in the Royal Australian Engineers (RAE) and served with distinction to produce timber for the war efforts. After the war, the first intake of ex-servicemen into the forestry school occurred. Twenty applications were received with four being selected. A further six were later enrolled in 1946–47.

VSF students were also subject to compulsory national service training in the 1950s. The forestry profession was not exempt and four students were conscripted to serve in Vietnam in the 1960s.

== Relationship with other Australian tertiary institutions ==
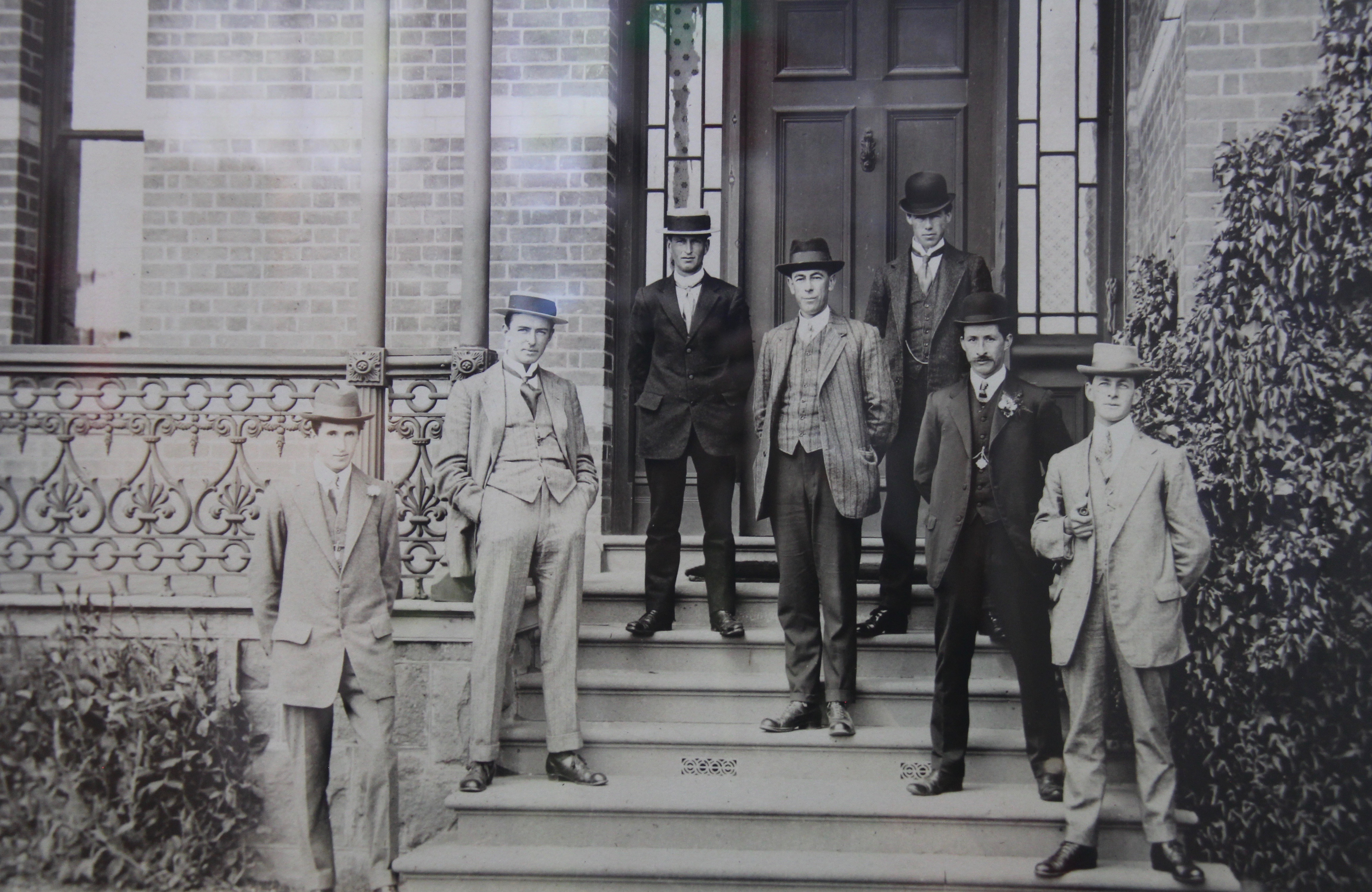
In 1910, six students began classes at the Victorian School of Forestry. Pictured on the steps of Tremearne House in 1912 are the graduates. From left to right: Walter Henry Horn, Reginald Graham Lindsay, Henry O. Felstead (Nursery superintendent), Norman L. Boston (Nursery staff), J. Sampson, A. Ken (Nursery staff), Arthur H. Warren. Source: Creswick Campus Historical Collection.

The twentieth century had started optimistically with the Federation of Australia, but co-operation between the states was hesitant. The leaders of the small state forest agencies met in 1911 and recommended that Australia needed to conserve sufficient forests and start plantations. Although they had already established forestry organisations as best they could, they needed better ways of recruiting and training foresters. Within a few months of each other, Victoria and South Australia started forestry schools but took paths that reflected their roots. Western Australia and NSW also started forestry schools at Ludlow and Narara in the 1920s but these schools only lasted for a few years.

An Australian Forestry School (AFS) was first mooted in 1916 and later established, initially in Adelaide in 1926, before moving to the Canberra suburb of Yarralumla in 1927 under the Commonwealth Department of National Development. Students undertaking the first two years of an appropriately designed science course at their (then sole) State University and then proceeding to Canberra to undertake a Diploma course over two years. The home university granted a Bachelor of Science in Forestry degree. Sixteen students representing all states, including Alf Lawrence from Victoria, were enrolled in 1926. Lecturing staff included Norman William Jolly, Charles Earnest Carter (ex Principal of VSF), Hugh Richard Gray and A. Rule while Charles Edward Lane Poole acted as Principal. The prestigious Schlich Medal was awarded annually to the outstanding forestry student at the Australian Forestry School from 1928. However, Victoria withdrew from the arrangement in 1930 and instead continued to support the VSF at Creswick, thereby starting a rift within the recently formed Institute of Foresters of Australia (IFA) that took many years to heal.

While other states cautiously relinquished their fledgling forestry schools, Victoria continued with supporting the VSF Diploma course after the Commonwealth started its national Australian Forestry School in 1926, partly due to an acrimonious dispute with the Commonwealth Inspector-General of Forestry and Principal of the School, Charles Edward Lane Poole, over the standard of the Victorian foresters. The Institute of Foresters of Australia, founded in 1935, was also racked over its refusal to grant full membership to foresters holding the Victorian Diploma.

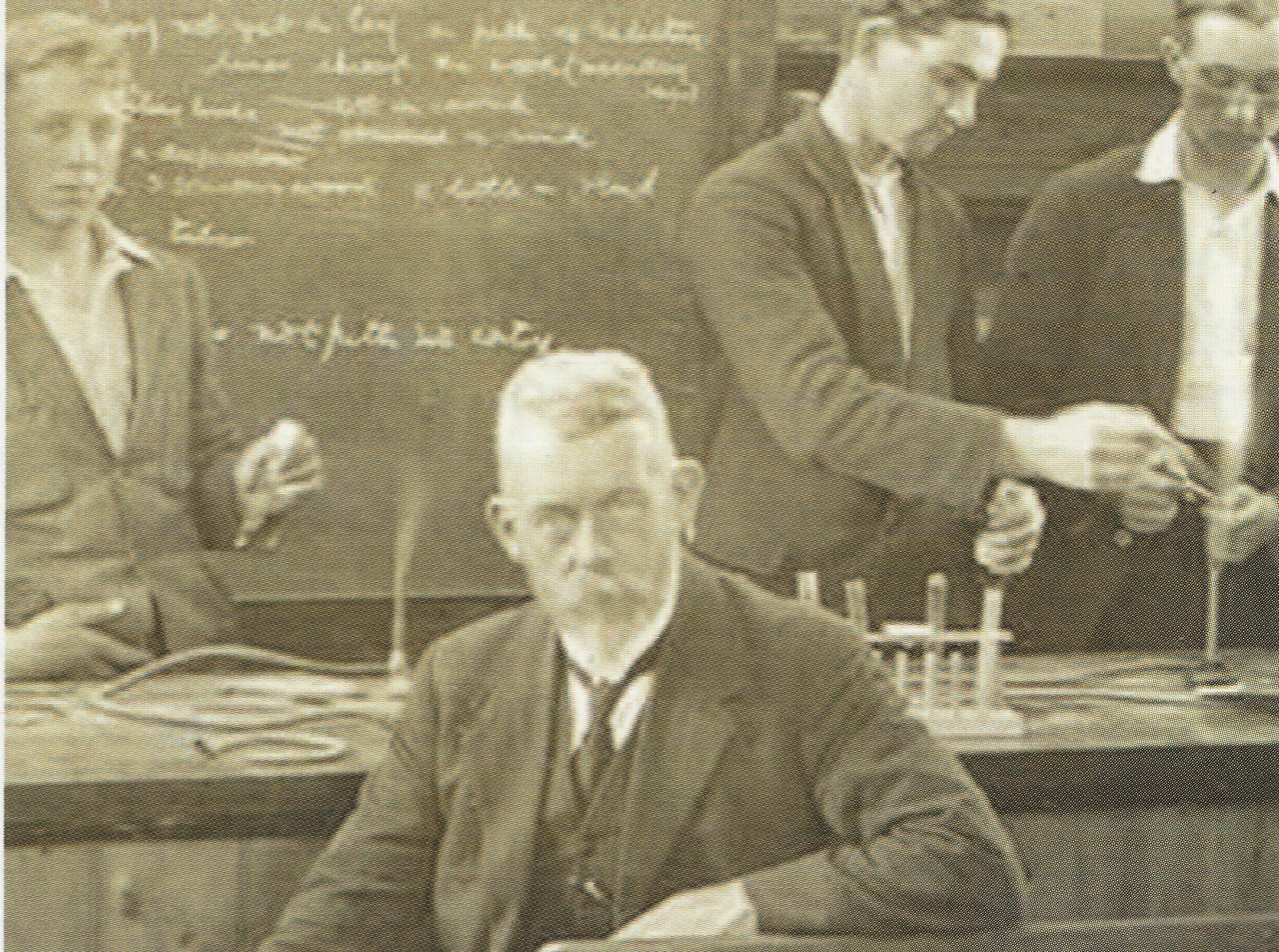
First senior master, Thomas Stephan Hart. Circa 1914. Source: FCRPA.

However, the first twenty years of the Australian Forestry School proved difficult. The Great Depression, the Second World War, the states’ suspicions of the Commonwealth, and the abrasive manner of the school's head, Charles Lane Poole, all acted to reduce the number of students being sent there; one year there were none and several times during the war years it was nearly closed. Upon Lane Poole's retirement in January 1945 Dr Maxwell Ralph Jacobs was appointed Principal, a position he held until 1959. The post war intake of students increased to between 15 and 30 with many from New Zealand until a school was opened at the University of Canterbury in Christchurch. By 1965 the responsibilities of the Australian Forestry School were transferred to the Australian National University in Canberra and it developed a four-year Bachelor of Science in Forestry degree and postgraduate research degrees.

From the mid-1940s, under the stewardship of the Chairman of the Forests Commission, Alfred Vernon Galbraith, students from Creswick extended their studies at the University of Melbourne to gain a Bachelor of Forest Science after the university established its own Forestry School in 1938. The two institutions worked well together and eventually, the Faculty of Agriculture and Forestry, University of Melbourne was created in 1973. The arrangement whereby Creswick diplomates could complete a degree with two years additional study at the university continued. Some VSF graduates continued their studies towards a master's degree or PhD research. By the late 1950s, Commission staff began to produce a stream of peer-reviewed research into the silviculture of key eucalypt species, especially on germination, growth rates and other aspects of productivity. In the 1960s, academic research expanded into areas such as soils, entomology and pathogenic threats to forests, hydrology and as well as fire research. Later in the 1970s, wildlife research, landscape management, economics and recreation demand.

One of the unforeseen and long term consequences of the dispute with Charles Lane Pool in the 1930s, combined with the rebuff from the Institute of Foresters, was that VSF Diploma graduates tended to remain in Victoria throughout their careers while Canberra and Melbourne University graduates tended to occupy roles in other state forestry services. Not surprisingly, there were some lingering rivalries over the perceived class division and unfortunately this had the effect of limiting the interchange of foresters across the State border. However, this undercurrent diminished over time as more Creswick foresters completed tertiary studies at Melbourne University.

Until the 1980s a Forestry, Agriculture or an Earth Science qualification like geomorphology was the traditional tertiary pathway into a land management career. Over time, many VSF graduates left the Forests Commission and went on to establish notable careers in other fields with the National Park Service, Fisheries and Wildlife, Alpine Resorts, Country Fire Authority, Soil Conservation Authority, LandCare, Land Conservation Council, Melbourne Water, teaching at tertiary institutions, consultancy, environmental NGO's, research organisations like the CSIRO and Universities, local government, the private sector, interstate and overseas.

== Diploma of Forestry - 1910 to 1980 ==
For seven decades from 1910 to 1980, small groups of young men, as few as 6 and up to 20, but usually 10–12, took three-year residential courses graduating with forestry diplomas. Over time the title of the qualifications conferred at Creswick evolved. Early students were granted a School Certificate, but later an Associate Diploma of the School of Forestry, Creswick (A Dip For Cres) was awarded. In 1969 regulations were introduced to rename the award the Diploma of Forestry, Creswick (Dip For Cres). Earlier Associate Diploma qualifications were also upgraded in this process. Around the same time as Victoria split from the Australian Forestry School in Canberra in the 1930s, the Board of Examiners created a more senior award called the Diploma of Forestry, Victoria (Dip For Vic) targeted mostly for Associate Diploma graduates who, after serving for three years in the department, submitted an acceptable thesis on an approved forestry subject to the Board of Forestry Education. Also because of the Victorian Public Service Board (PSB) rules that prevailed at the time, many Associate Diploma holders employed by the Forests Commission held fears about jobs and promotions going to graduates with Degrees and their ability to work interstate. The Dip For Vic qualification was deemed by the Commission and PSB to be equivalent to a Degree for the purposes of promotion and 64 were granted between 1935 and 1983.

While the Forests Commission was responsible for the administration of the school and appointment of the Principal, a Board of Forestry Education was created in 1962 (replacing the earlier Board of Examiners) and was responsible for ensuring high academic standards. The new Board grew from 4 to 11 members and included distinguished academics from the University of Melbourne such as John Harding Chinner.

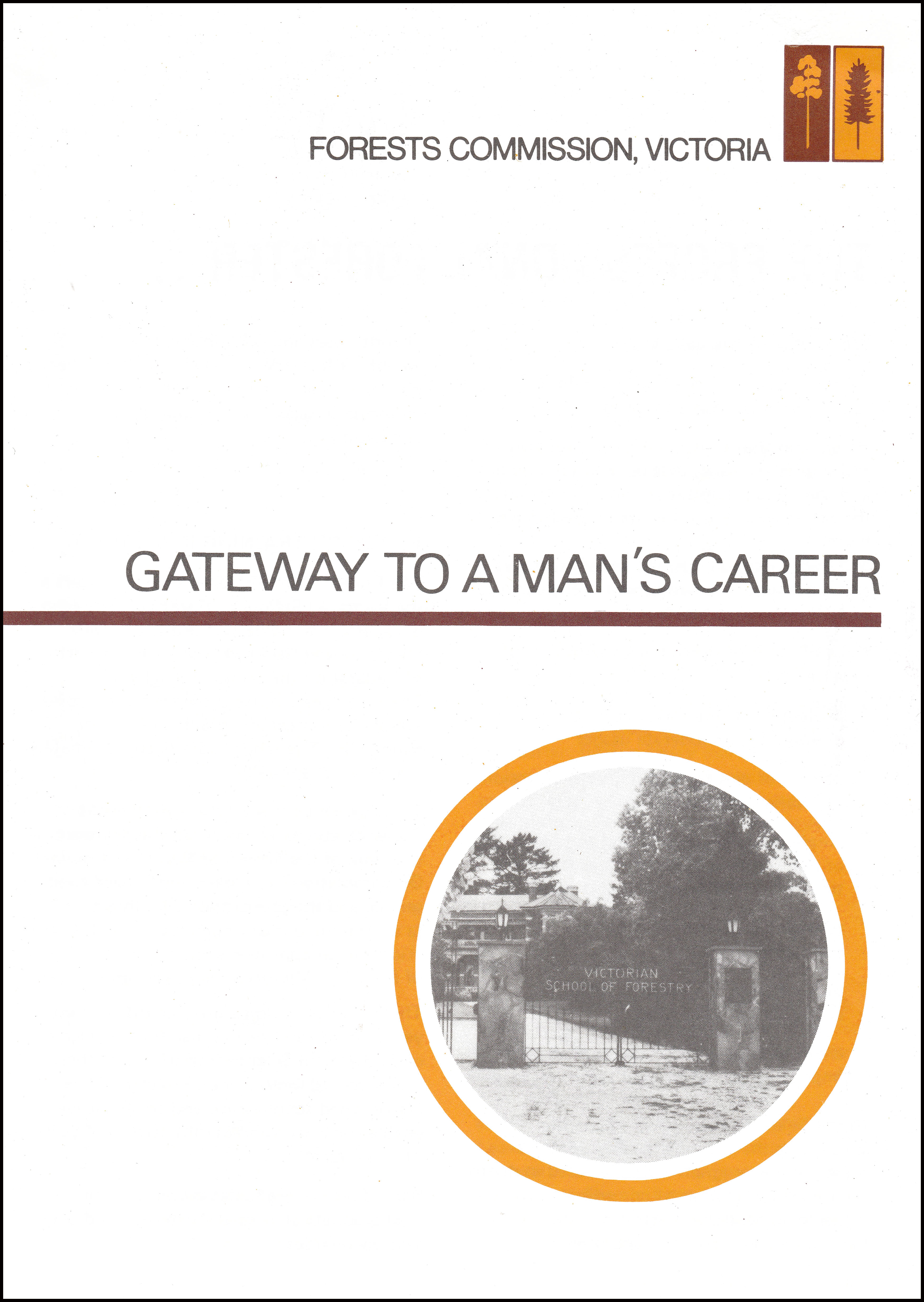
Brochure sent to prospective students of VSF - 1974

Students generally entered the school on fully funded scholarships and were "bonded" to work for the Forests Commission for a period of three years upon completion of their Diplomas, in what often turned out to be “a-career-for-life”. VSF scholarships were keenly sought as they offered a tertiary education for students from modest backgrounds, like Alfred (Alf) Oscar Lawrence who graduated from Creswick in 1922, undertook forest assessment and mapping surveys in the red gum forests along the Murray River before studying at Oxford in 1934 on a Russell Grimwade prize. Upon his return, he was appointed Fire Protection Officer during a difficult period following the disastrous 1939 bushfires and set about developing a highly organised fire fighting force, including introducing modern equipment such as powered pumps, aircraft, and a statewide radio communications network. Alf Lawrence rose to become Chairman of the Forests Commission in 1956 and was later awarded an OBE for his outstanding services to forestry and scouting in 1969.

While there were many distinguished graduates of VSF, Alfred (Alf) John Leslie stands out as a true international forester. After graduation in 1941 and a short stint with the Forests Commission on the Toorongo Plateau near Noojee supervising the 1939 bushfire salvage, he served in the Royal Australian Navy as a submariner where he was seriously wounded. After recuperating from his injuries and returning to Taggerty, Mansfield and then Beech Forest he completed a forestry degree at the University of Melbourne in 1948. He left the Commission in 1951 to join Australian Paper Manufacturers (APM) in the Latrobe Valley to establish their new pulpwood plantations. Later taking up a position as senior lecturer at the University of Melbourne in 1958, he was recruited to the Food and Agriculture Organisation (FAO) of the United Nations in 1963 to lead forestry projects in Nigeria before ending up in Rome in 1968. He also presided over the International Tropical Timbers Organisation (ITTO) and International Union of Foresters before receiving an honorary doctorate from the University of Melbourne in 1994 in recognition for his services to international forestry.

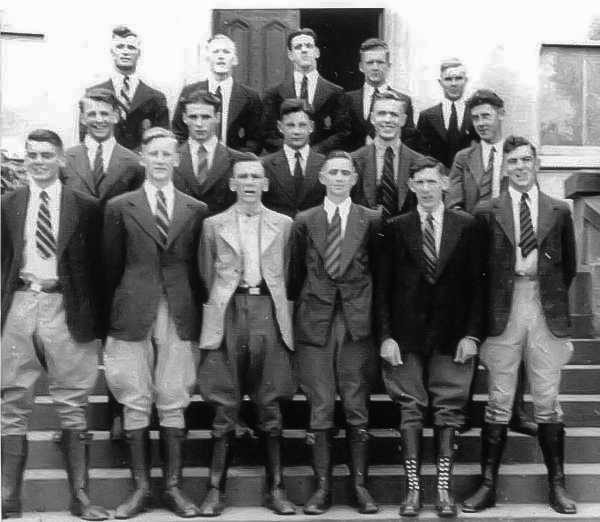
A group of VSF students from 1942 in school uniform consisting of riding breeches, leggings, tie and blazer. Source: Bert Semmens.

In the immediate postwar period VSF flourished as the Forests Commission increased its intake of graduates to meet the demands on Victoria's forest resources and the timber needs of the housing boom.

Traditionally, VSF had been promoted as a "gateway to a man's career" with the first group of women entering the forestry school in 1976.

Between 1910 and 1980 a total of 592 students entered the VSF to undertake studies towards the Diploma of Forestry and of these 522 completed the course. In later years, most VSF Diploma graduates went on to further studies at Melbourne University and other tertiary institutes. Over the years, several students did not complete the Diploma course but also found employment with the Forests Commission.

In another development, the Forestry School added a Certificate of Applied Science course in 1977 for forest overseers already employed by the commission. Temporary accommodation huts were built at the rear of the school affectionately known as Siberia.

== VSF museum, grounds and demonstration forest ==
In addition to many historic buildings, museums, herbaria and other collections have long been present at the school. In 1912, only three years after the VSF opened, a botany laboratory and a geology museum were founded with a larger museum officially established in 1929. Today the VSF Herbarium is considered to be one of the most significant sub-collections in the Creswick Collection. It is estimated that the herbarium contains 10,000 specimens, representing between 2,500 and 3,000 different species of plants, fungi and insects, collected over more than a century. Among the more important samples are the specimens prepared by Government Botanist Baron Sir Ferdinand von Mueller in 1874 and Dr James Hamlyn Willis, who studied at VSF from 1928 to 1930 and went on to become one of the school's most successful and respected graduates. A large collection of other artifacts, documents, glass slides and photos is housed at the school. A number of notable graduates from VSF Creswick made significant contributions towards understanding the ecology of Victoria's forests.

The school is set on 15 hectares of grounds with many unique specimen trees. A seedling of Pinus brutia was propagated from the original tree at Lone Pine at Gallipoli and planted in the grounds on 23 March 1975. The tree was the sole survivor of a group that had been cut down by Turkish soldiers to cover their trenches with the timber and branches during the ferocious battle in 1915. A plaque was also unveiled by Legacy to commemorate soldiers who fought in WW1. A grove of trees was planted in 2009 in front of Tremearne House to honour a famous student from the 1940s, Alfred Leslie.

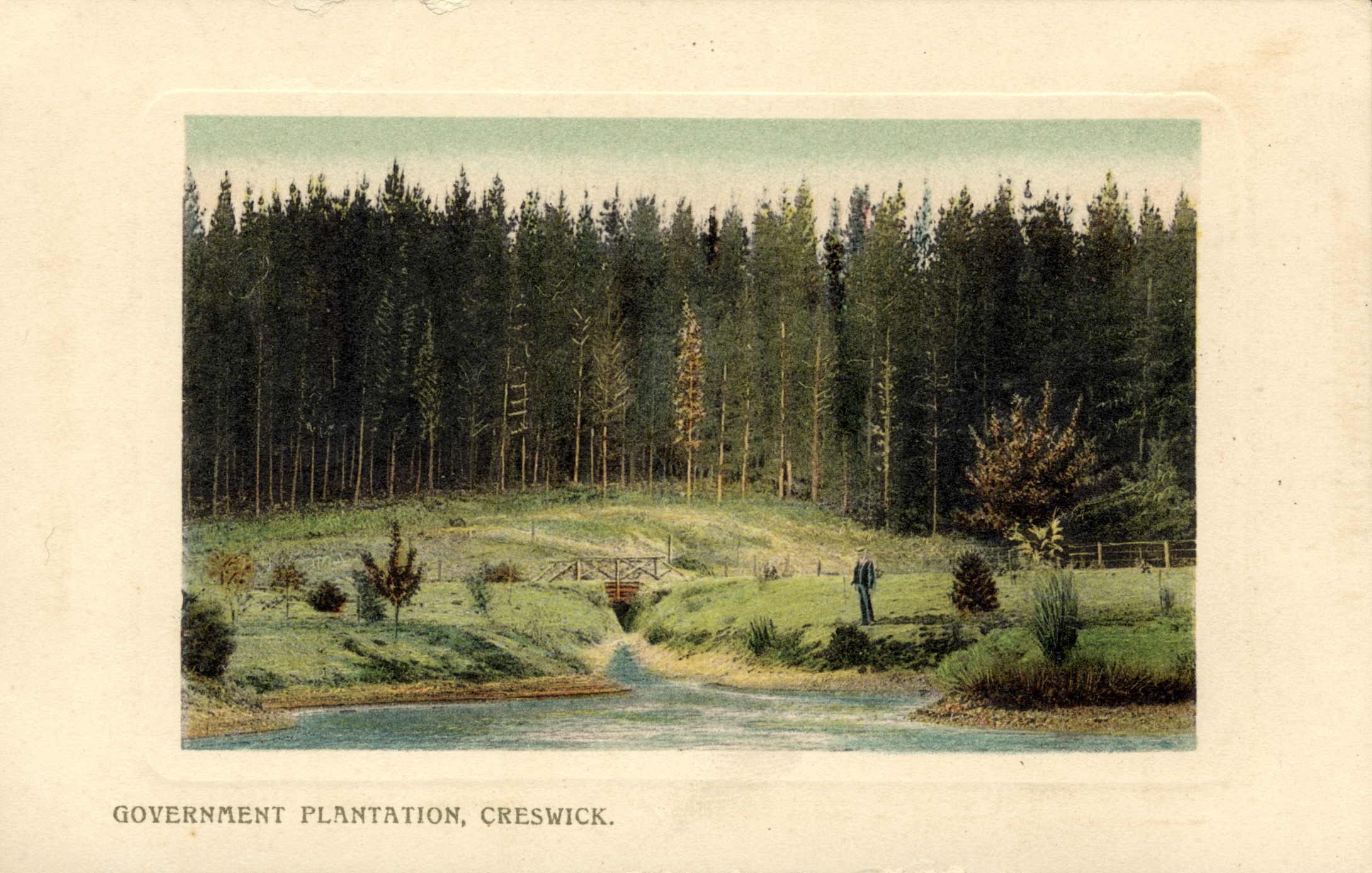
Government plantations at Creswick were established in the late 1800s to rehabilitate areas damaged by gold mining. Some formed part of the 1200 acre school demonstration forest. St Georges Lake "Govvy Dam" in foreground. Circa 1911. Source: State Library of Victoria.

HRH Prince Charles stayed overnight at VSF during his visit on 28 October 1974 and planted a Eucalyptus leucoxylon (yellow gum) near the science laboratory.

The school also had a large "demonstration forest" of some 1200 acres set aside within a mile of the campus with native forests and softwood plantations which already exceed 800 acres, together with a large forest nursery established by John La Gerche in the late 1800s.

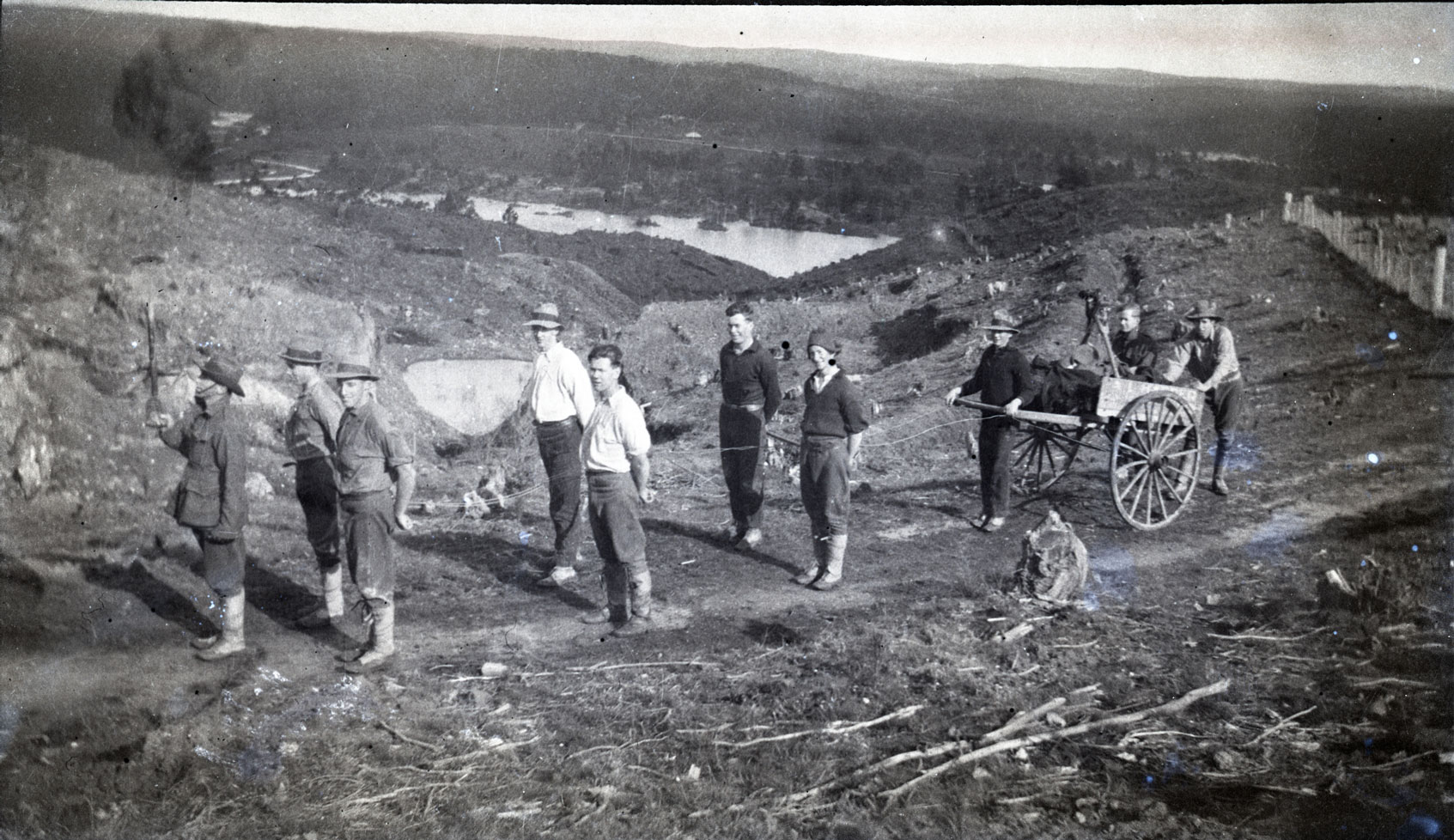
VSF students - field work in the school demonstration forest. Brackenbury Road, overlooking St Georges Lake "Govvy Dam". Circa 1930. Source: FCRPA Museum.

In addition to rigorous academic study, VSF had a very strong focus on preparing students suited to Victorian conditions and on acquiring practical skills of forestry. Horsemanship was included in the curriculum at Creswick up until the 1960s and regular field work in the demonstration forest performing thinning, road works, planting or raising seedlings in the nearby nursery were an important part of the Victorian diploma course.

A small park was set aside for the preservation of Koalas by the Minister for Forests, Mr Albert Lind, in November 1942 to mark the centenary of the township of Creswick. The park was fenced to contain the koalas which had been relocated from Phillip Island and was looked after by students as a popular picnic ground with walking trails. Other recreation sites were also constructed and maintained, particularly around St Georges Lake.

In February 1977 a bushfire swept through a large part of the demonstration forest and destroyed many fine old stands of timber established in the 1880s including a plot of ponderosa pine that had been planted for sailing ship masts.

== Merger with the University of Melbourne - 1980 ==
Prior to 1967, VSF had been wholly funded by the Victorian Government through the Forests Commission which was responsible for its day-to-day administration. Commonwealth funding was then made available, but in 1975 the Commonwealth indicated that it was no longer prepared to continue funding for Creswick as a separate, single-discipline institution after 1978 and pointedly proposed an amalgamation with the rapidly expanding Ballarat College of Advanced Education (formally the School of Mines).

Meanwhile, there had been a long association, with some friendly academic and personal rivalries, between VSF, the Forests Commission and the University of Melbourne. So after a period of tumultuous negotiation between two strong minded intellectuals, Dr Frank Moulds, Chairman of the Forests Commission, (and ex Principal of VSF), and the Dean of the University Faculty of Agriculture and Forestry, Dr John Harding Chinner (who attended VSF and graduated as dux in 1931, Rhodes Scholar - 1939), an agreement was finally reached whereby the university took over the administration of VSF at the end of 1980, using both the Creswick and its main Parkville (Melbourne) campus. In 1978, a new Chairman of the commission was appointed and Alan Threader took a lead role in cementing the new arrangement. As part of the agreement, the Commission ceased offering its Diploma course on condition that the university taught two years of its four-year degree course at Creswick. In the transition period, twelve VSF students completed their first year of the Diploma course in 1979 then transferred to the second year of the Degree course at Melbourne University in 1980. But the era of vocational training in government institutions gave way to university education and the generous fully funded scholarships from the Forests Commission came to an end.

VSF was then renamed the School of Ecosystem and Forest Sciences but retained a basic degree structure, increased the variety of courses, again including diplomas, and greatly extending research, from honours and masters projects to PhDs and post-doctoral level. Numerous international students studied at Creswick, other faculties and organisations also used the campus, and a timber trade training centre was established nearby.

Later in 1982, saw the appointment of Ian Ferguson as Foundation Professor of Forest Science.

The school celebrated its centenary in 2010 and while the tempo has slowed the Creswick campus remains a major center of Australian forest science.

== VSF emblem ==
The colours and emblem for the Victorian School of Forestry were designed in 1916 when Charlie Carter became the Principal. He remained Principal until 1926.

It was a joint effort with the students. Significantly, it was decided by Mr Carter and the students that the institution at Creswick should be a School rather than a college. So it could have easily been VCF.

The motto Circumspice, which is Latin for “look around you”, was suggested by Mr Carter who believed that foresters should always be observant.

The plant in the design is Acacia mollissima (black wattle) the bark of which was used extensively as a source of tannin used in the leather industry at the time.

The boomerang beneath the crown was incorporated as another Australian element.

This information was provided in a letter dated March 1973 to the Principal at VSF, Alan Eddy by Sibley Elliott who was a student in 1916 when the emblem was designed.

== Principals (1910-1981) ==
The following table lists the Principals of the Victorian School of Forestry, from the institution's opening in 1910 until its merger with the University of Melbourne in 1980.

Dates	Principal	Qualifications	Notes
1910-12	Vacant		
1913-15	Thomas Stephan Hart	M.A., M.C.E.	Formerly Professor of Geology and Mining at the Ballarat School of Mines.
1916-19	Charles Earnest Carter	B Ag. Sc., Dip. Ed	Charles Earnest Carter became Senior Master, seconded from the Department of Public Instruction, where he was a high-school teacher. During his first few years at Creswick, Carter completed a Diploma in Education and a Degree in Agriculture at the University of Melbourne.
1920-22	William Wilson Gay	Dip. Ag. Sc	Appointed while Charles Earnest Carter attended Yale University to study for the two-year Master of Forestry degree.
1923-26	Charles E Carter	M.F. (Yale), B. Ag. Sc.	Resumed position as Principal upon returning from Yale.
1927	Karl V M Ferguson	M.A., B Sc. (Forestry)	Appointed when Charles Earnest Carter transferred to the new Australian Forestry School (AFS) in Canberra. Ferguson later transferred to the University of Melbourne in 1944 as senior lecturer.
1928-51	Dr Edwin James (E J) Semmens, MBE	B.Sc., Dip, Ed., F.L.S.	Edwin James Semmens was invited to become Principal of VSF during a difficult stage of its development. Principal for 23 years, E.J. as he was known introduced a broad curriculum for the three-year, residential course, set high standards and made himself available outside normal working hours to guide the study habits and interests of his students. He was awarded an OBE in 1968 for his services to the forestry and the community together with honorary Doctorate of Forest Science from the University of Melbourne in 1977.
1951-56	Dr Frank Robert Moulds, Imperial Service Order, AO	Ph.D. (Yale), B.Sc., Dip. For. (Cres)	Frank Moulds graduated from VSF in 1933 and went on to study a Bachelor of Science at the University of Melbourne. After several years as a field forester he was appointed Principal of VSF in 1951 but left at the end of 1956 to study a PhD at Yale on a Sterling Scholarship. Later becoming Chairman of the Forests Commission in 1969 he led negotiations with Dr John Harding Chinner from the University of Melbourne over the future tertiary training of foresters in Victoria. He was elected Fellow of the Institute of Foresters.
1957-69	William (Billo) Litster	B. Sc. (Hons.) (Forestry)	Originally from Peebles in Scotland. Studied B.Sc. at Edinburgh University. Served 41 years (1928-1969) lecturing students at VSF including 18 years as Principal. Made many modifications to the school grounds, arboretums and the swamp in 1968
1969-77	Alan R Eddy	M.F. (Calif.), B.Sc. For., Dip. For. (Cres.)	VSF graduate of 1948. Spent time at various field locations. Studied for a Masters of Forestry at California in 1958 on a Fulbright scholarship. Lecturer at the school from 1954 to 1966. Returned as Principal at the beginning of 1969. Considerable expertise in wood technology. Fellow of the Institute of Foresters (IFA). Oversaw a decade of significant changes to the school including the first women students in 1976 and certificate program for FCV forest overseers.
1978-81	Dr James (Jim) Edgar	B. Sc. For, M.Sc. (US), PhD (U.Michigan), Dip. For. (Cres.)	Principal 1978–1981. Oversaw the initial transition of VSF to the University of Melbourne.
1980			1980 saw the graduation of the last group of VSF's three-year diplomates, bringing the total to 522 since the School's inception. Affiliation of the School moves from the FCV to Melbourne University. ‘Transition’ phase continues.
1981-92	Robert (Bob) G. Orr, OAM.	Dip. For. (Oxon.), B.Sc. For. (Melb.), Dip. For (Cres), Dip. Ed. (Monash)	Bob Orr became Principal in 1981. He had been senior lecturer at VSF since 1969 and acted in the Principal's role when Dr Edgar was on assignment elsewhere. Active in the local community, particularly on the Board of the Creswick District Hospital and John Curtin Aged Care and later as a Hepburn Shire Councillor (Mayor 1997). From 1981 - University students now undertake the Second and Third Years, of the four-year degree course, at Creswick. School continues to be used for training by Victorian agencies.
1984			Renamed - Victorian School of Forestry and Land Management (VSFLM)
1992	Dr Ross Squire	Ph.D. (Melb), M.F For (Melb), B.Sc. For.(Melb), Dip. For. (Cres.)	Dr Squire was noted for his work in the FCV research branch studying the long-term productivity of pine plantations and silviculture of eucalyptus. Campus renamed - School of Ecosystem and Forest Sciences.
1994-2004			The university and the (then) Victorian Department of Conservation and Natural Resources form a jointly owned company, limited by guarantee, to carry forward the management of the Creswick School site. This arrangement survives until 2004, when the university assumes direct control of the site.

== See also ==
- List of historic schools of forestry
- List of forestry technical schools
