= James Hamlyn Willis =

Australian botanist

James Hamlyn Willis AM
- Born: 28 January 1910; Oakleigh, Victoria
- Died: 10 November 1995 (aged 85)
- Education: University of Melbourne
- Scientific career
- Fields: Botany
- Workplaces: National Herbarium of Victoria
- Author abbrev. (botany): J.H.Willis

James Hamlyn Willis AM (28 January 1910 – 10 November 1995) was an Australian botanist. He described 64 new species of plants, and published more than 880 works including the landmark two-volume A Handbook to plants in Victoria between 1962 and 1973.

== Life ==
Willis was born in Oakleigh, Victoria in 1910. In 1913 he moved with his family to Stanley on the northern coast of Tasmania, Australia, where they remained until returning to Victoria in 1924. He attended Melbourne High School and in 1928, following receipt of a scholarship, began studies at the Victorian School of Forestry in Creswick, graduating with a Diploma of Forestry in 1930. For the next seven years he was employed by the Forests Commission of Victoria as a forest officer.

In 1937 Willis joined the National Herbarium of Victoria and commenced studies at the University of Melbourne, graduating with a Bachelor of Science (Honours) in 1940. Between 1958 and 1959, he held the position of Australian Botanical Liaison Officer at the Royal Botanic Gardens, Kew, and in 1961 he was appointed as Assistant Government Botanist for Victoria. Between 1970 and 1972, he was the acting director of the Royal Botanic Gardens, Melbourne. He became the first editor of Muelleria, the peer-reviewed scientific journal published by the Royal Botanic Gardens Victoria, editing the first three issues. Willis retired from the National Herbarium of Victoria in 1972.

== Botanical collecting ==
Willis was an avid collector of vascular and non-vascular plants, and fungi. Whilst working at the National Herbarium of Victoria, he was able to participate in many field expeditions to various floristic regions in Victoria. Willis also ventured to Western Australia as a member of the Sir Russell Grimwade Expedition in 1947, and to the Recherche Archipelago in 1950. He also collected outside of Australia on various trips made to New Zealand, New Guinea, Europe, Sri Lanka and China. The National Herbarium of Victoria holds over 20,000 specimens collected by Willis. Other herbaria holding specimens collected by Willis include Victorian School of Forestry, National Herbarium of New South Wales, Western Australian Herbarium, Auckland War Memorial Museum, Australian National Herbarium, State Herbarium of South Australia, Tasmanian Herbarium, Northern Territory Herbarium, New Zealand Fungarium.

== Recognition ==
In addition to having named new species himself, a species of eucalypt is named after him, Eucalyptus willisii.

Willis was appointed a Member of the Order of Australia in the 1995 Queen's Birthday Honours for "service to botany, particularly in the field of Australian flora".

Following Willis' death in 1995, from 1996 onwards, the National Herbarium of Victoria has hosted the Jim Willis Studentship in his honour. This is a competitive eight week programme held during the summer where students gain research experience working on a specific research project under the supervision of a herbarium research staff member.

In 2000, the Gladstone Bag belonging to Willis used to collect specimens on his many field expeditions was uncovered in extraordinary circumstances. It is now part of the Victorian School of Forestry museum collection at Creswick.

The standard author abbreviation J.H.Willis is used to indicate this person as the author when citing a botanical name.

== See also ==
- Category:Taxa named by James Hamlyn Willis
