= Australian Forestry Group UK =

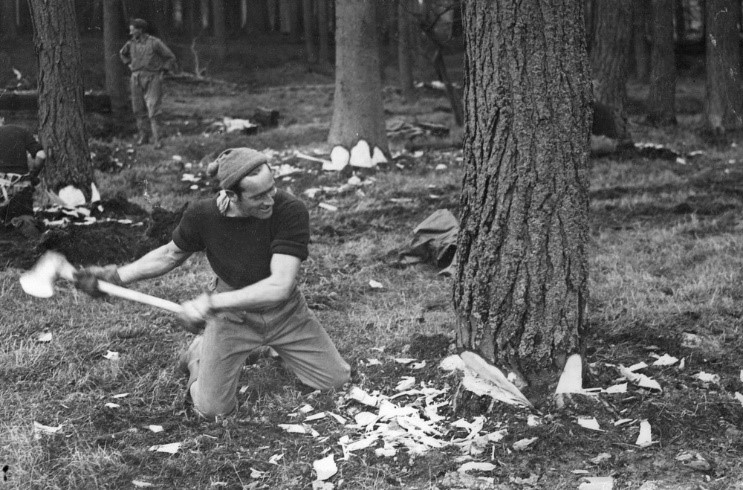
Cutting trees flush with the ground was the British custom. 2/2 Forestry Company - Scotland, 1940.

The Australian Forestry Group UK was an element of the Second Australian Imperial Force raised for forestry duties. Its constituent units were established in 1940 and 1941 in response to a request from the British Government for foresters to work in France. After the fall of France the three Australian forestry companies were sent to the United Kingdom. The group headquarters was raised in July 1941. The foresters worked in northern England and Scotland, and had a secondary military role. The Australian Forestry Group returned to Australia via the United States in 1943, and its three companies later served in the Northern Territory and New Guinea.

== History ==
In 1939, the British Government requested that Australia raise three, 200-man strong companies of foresters to join a force of twenty units drawn from Canada and further three from New Zealand to support the British Expeditionary Force in France and the Australian Government readily agreed. However, in line with a request from the French Government, all of their officers were to be members of either the Commonwealth or State government forest services or employed in the sawmilling industry so that the wasteful cutting and damage experienced in World War I was not repeated.

Two forestry companies were quickly raised in 1940 as part of the Royal Australian Engineers (RAE). The first Forestry Company (2/1) was in Sydney with men from NSW, Queensland and South Australia led by Captain Cyril Richard Cole, a professional forester from the Australian Capital Territory, while a second Forestry Company (2/2) was raised in Melbourne under the command of Captain Andrew Leonard (Ben) Benallack from the Forests Commission Victoria with soldiers recruited from Victoria, Tasmania and Western Australia. All units included men who had served in the war of 1914–18.

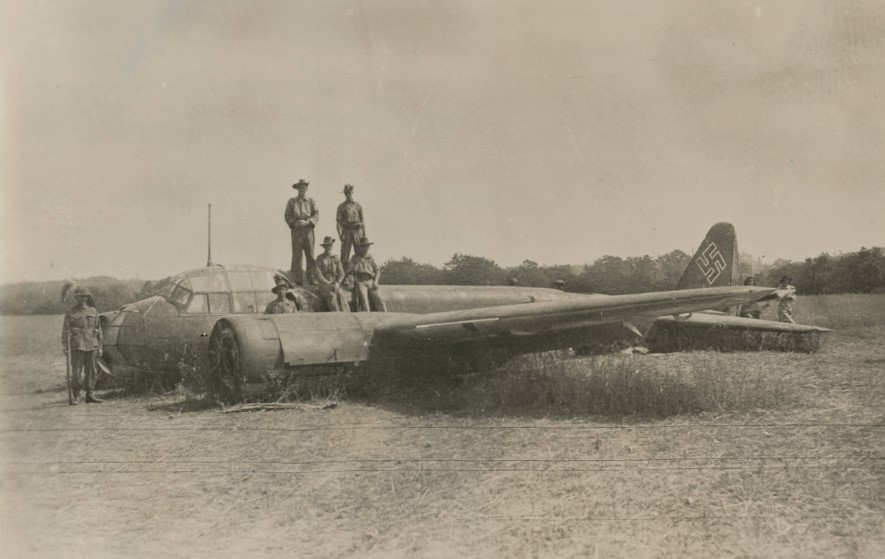
Forestry Company soldiers guard a crashed German Junkers Ju 88 during the Battle of Britain. August 1940.

The two Forestry Companies sailed from Fremantle on the Stratheden on 30 May 1940 destined for the Suez Canal but were diverted to England via Cape Town after France fell to Germany and the subsequent Dunkirk evacuation. The troops landed in July and undertook further military training in at Alton, southern England. They were immediately positioned to guard against invasion while the Battle of Britain was in full fury overhead.

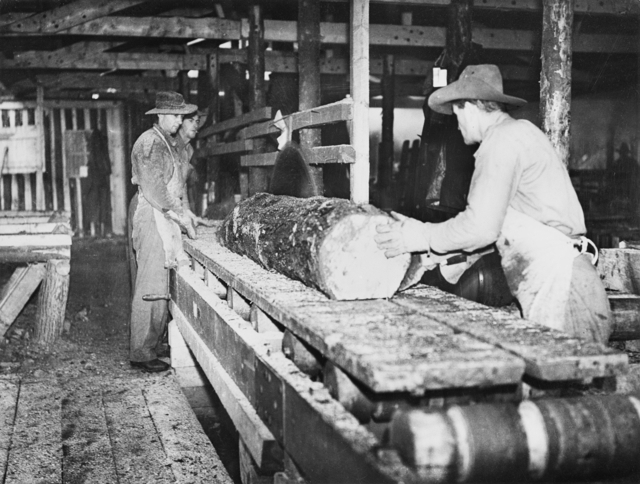
Australian Army foresters working in a sawmill during late 1940

Prior to the war, Britain had sourced much of its timber from Scandinavian countries but then had to rely on its own forests to meet its timber needs. As the threat of invasion receded the men from the two Forestry Companies were deployed to Northumberland during September 1940. The 2/1 Forestry Company went to Seahouses, south of Berwick-upon-Tweed while the 2/2 moved to Hexham west of Newcastle upon Tyne.

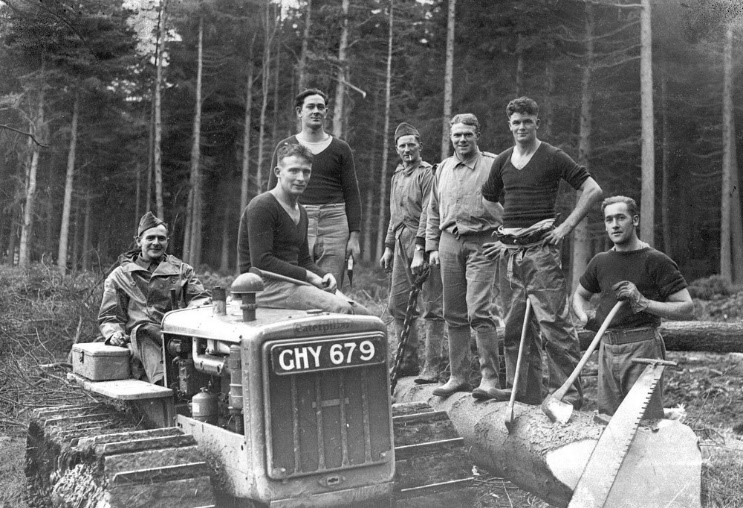
The forestry companies were equipped in the UK.

Whereas the Canadians came self-contained and brought logging equipment and sawmill machinery with them, the Australian and New Zealand companies had to be equipped in Britain. Equipment was in short supply and was not what they were used to. Until crawler-tractors were available, converted agricultural tractors had to serve for logging operations. There were no chainsaws, just axes and crosscut saws. Also the winter of 1940–41 was particularly cold and hard on the men. Many had not seen snow before. Another shock was the British requirement to cut trees flush at ground level rather than at two or three feet which meant sometimes kneeling in the snow and mud using clumsy knee pads.

As the need for forestry companies persisted the 2/3 Forestry Company of 150 men was formed in Melbourne in March–April 1941 under the Command of Major Mervyn Alexander Rankin, a forester from the South Australian Woods and Forests Department. Some additional reinforcements were recruited as well as staff for a group HQ. The 2/3 Forestry Company sailed from Sydney on 4 June 1941 in the Themistocles and the Largs Bay arrived in the UK in August 1941.

In July of that year, the Australian Forestry Group was established to command all three units. It was led by Lieutenant-Colonel Cyril Richard Cole, a veteran of WWI, throughout its existence. A medical officer was attached to the group to supervise the foresters' medical treatment. All three companies were relocated to Dumfriesshire in Scotland during 1941.

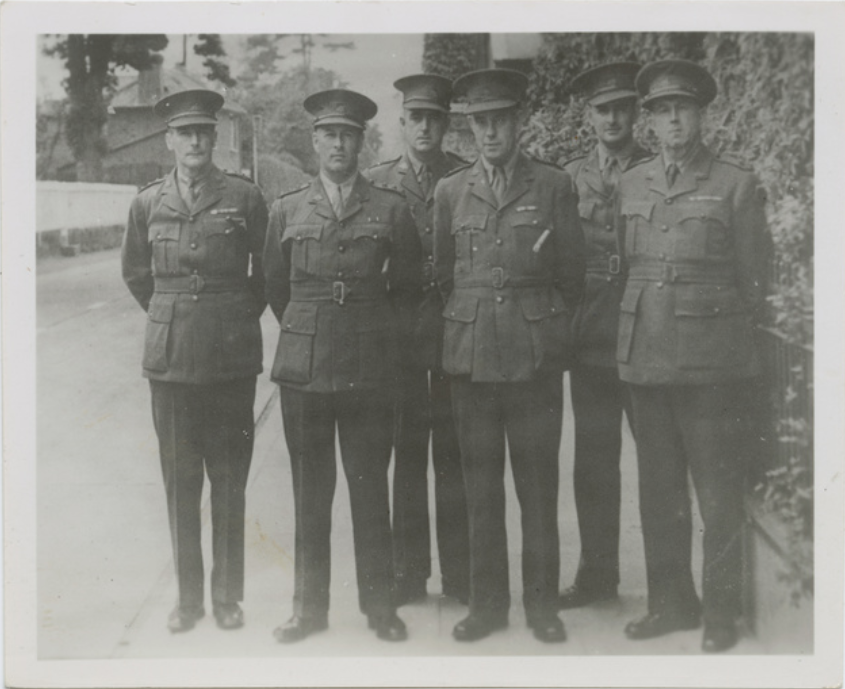
Australian officers of the Forestry and Railway Companies at Alton, Hampshire. Left to right: Captain Cyril Richard Cole, 2/1 Forestry Company; Captain George Robert Verner Smith, Adj, Railways Company; Captain Arthur Rodney Lockwood, 2/3 Railway Construction Company, Lieutenant Colonel Keith Aird Fraser, Railways Company; Captain Andrew Leonard Benallack, 2/2 Forestry Company; Major Percy Stanley Robinson, 2/2 Railways Company. 1940.

To maximise the Australian foresters' productivity, less skilled forestry workers from Honduras and Italian Prisoners of War (POWs) were placed under their control to undertake unskilled work. As well as working with timber, the forestry companies also maintained their military skills and undertook military training for one day each week and a fortnight every six months. The companies were allocated roles in British counter-invasion plans.

The Australian Forestry Group moved to Sussex in mid-1943 but shortly afterwards the group departed the UK for Australia and by the time they left the UK, the Australians had produced 30 million super feet (90 000 m3) of sawn timber.

The foresters had closer and more frequent interactions with British civilians than the AIF infantry units. They were initially billeted with civilians in private homes, and later usually accommodated in camps located near villages. The foresters were granted local leave most days, which allowed them to drink in pubs after completing their work. By the time the Forestry Group returned to Australia, 120 of its men had married British women and 40 children had been born. The Group departed the UK for Australia on 22 September 1943, but the wives of the men who had married in the UK were unable to accompany them until August 1944 due to a lack of shipping.

The New Zealand forestry companies and the Canadian Forestry Corps remained in the UK and were deployed to Europe after the D-Day invasion of Normandy on 6 June 1944.

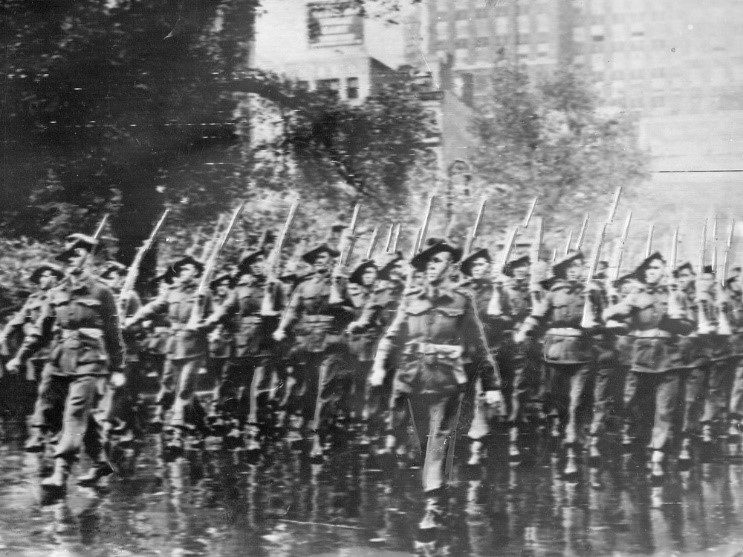
Marching with fixed bayonets in the pouring rain down Broadway, New York on Friday 1 October 1943. Marching in the front row is Lt John (Jack) Godfrey Saxton from an innovative Victorian sawmilling family, who had survived the 1939 bushfires by sheltering in a dugout at Tanjil Bren. Source: AWM.

Meanwhile, the Women's Timber Corps, was created in Britain as a unit of the Women's Land Army. Also known as LumberJills, they worked alongside other military units such as the Australian forestry companies to produce timber for the war effort. Their tasks included felling, stripping bark and branches, loading, crosscutting, driving tractors, trucks, working with horses and operating sawmills. Some did more specialist tasks of assessing timber in trees, measuring the amount of timber felled, surveying new woodlands and identifying trees for harvesting.

The Australian soldiers returned via America and were given the unique honour of marching in a ticker-tape parade, with fixed bayonets, down Broadway in New York on Friday 1 October 1943, said to be the only occasion that armed foreign troops had marched through an American city since Independence. Following their return to Australia in November, the forestry companies, undertook jungle warfare training at Canungra and received some new equipment and were later deployed to the Northern Territory and Papua New Guinea.

In PNG the forestry companies operated different machinery in several locations but continued to harvest logs and produce much needed sawn timber including durable material for wharfs and jetties. They worked alongside New Zealand and American forestry companies. Local people, as well as some Japanese POWs, provided labour.

At the cessation of hostilities in 1945 all three Australian forestry companies were progressively disbanded but some men remained as late as 1946 to help with reconstruction.

Nine men from the forestry companies were honoured, including Lieutenant-Colonel Cyril Richard Cole with an Order of the British Empire (OBE), but six men died in accidents or from illness.
