= List of Australian film directors =

This is a list Australian film directors.

== A ==
- Henry and Aaron
- Sunny Abberton
- Shane Abbess
- Dominic Allen
- Richard James Allen
- Louise Alston
- Stephen Amis
- Mario Andreacchio
- Luke Anthony
- Neil Armfield
- Gillian Armstrong
- Eddie Arya
- Oscar Asche
- Daniel Askill
- Igor Auzins
- Phillip Avalon
- Violeta Ayala
- Tony Ayres

Back to top

== B ==
- Bill Bain
- Franklyn Barrett
- Shirley Barrett
- Luke Bakhuizen
- Ian Barry
- Adam Bayliss
- Bill Bennett
- George Beranger
- Bruce Beresford
- Dean Bertram
- Matt Bird
- Wayne Blair
- Jamie Blanks
- Craig Boreham
- Ruth Borgobello
- Terry Bourke
- Gabrielle Brady
- Robert Braiden
- Kenneth Brampton
- Gil Brealey
- Ben Briand
- Sue Brooks
- Philip Brophy
- Amanda Brotchie
- Noah brothers
- Spierig brothers
- Nigel Buesst
- Charli Burrowes
- Tim Burstall
- Peter Butt

Back to top

== C ==
- David Caesar
- Ken Cameron
- Serhat Caradee
- A. J. Carter
- Pauline Chan
- David Charles
- Charles Chauvel
- Nathan Christoffel
- Robert Chuter
- Ernie Clark
- Alan Clay
- Genevieve Clay
- James Clayden
- Jub Clerc
- Graeme Clifford
- Peter Clifton
- Edward Irham Cole
- Bob Connolly
- Robert Connolly
- Kenneth Cook
- John Cornell
- Peter Cornwell
- John Cosgrove
- Amiel Courtin-Wilson
- Tom Cowan
- Paul Cox
- Emma-Kate Croghan
- Donald Crombie
- Paul Currie

Back to top

== D ==
- Hattie Dalton
- Roy Darling
- Jonathan Dawson
- Rob Dickson
- Ross Dimsey
- John Dingwall
- Khoa Do
- Jerzy Domaradzki
- Andrew Dominik
- Elissa Down
- Christopher Doyle
- Matt Drummond
- John Duigan
- Peter Duncan

Back to top

== E ==
- Gary Eck
- Nash Edgerton
- Colin Eggleston
- Nabil Elderkin
- David Elfick
- Stephan Elliott
- Bob Ellis
- Luke Eve

Back to top

== F ==
- Martin Fabinyi
- Peter Faiman
- Dan Fallshaw
- Alby Falzon
- John Farrow
- Don Featherstone
- Paul Fenech
- David Field
- Richard Flanagan
- Claude Flemming
- Brendan Fletcher
- Abe Forsythe
- Richard Frankland
- Richard Franklin
- Glenn Fraser
- Alex Frayne
- William Freshman

Back to top

== G ==
- Kieran Galvin
- John Gavin
- Matthew George
- Craig Gillespie
- Clay Glen
- Alister Grierson
- Timothy Grucza

Back to top

== H ==
- Ben Hackworth
- Russell Hagg
- Ken G. Hall
- Ken Hannam
- Brian Hannant
- Brady Haran
- Sandy Harbutt
- Rod Hardy
- Mark Hartley
- A. R. Harwood
- Gerald M. Hayle
- Rolf de Heer
- Trudy Hellier
- Jon Hewitt
- John Heyer
- Alan Hicks
- Scott Hicks
- Arthur Higgins
- Zak Hilditch
- John Hillcoat
- Lyndall Hobbs
- P. J. Hogan
- Cecil Holmes
- Janine Hosking
- Kate Howarde
- Frank Howson
- Patrick Hughes

Back to top

== I ==
- Stephen M. Irwin

Back to top

== J ==
- Clayton Jacobson
- Tom Jeffrey
- Steve Jodrell
- Mark Joffe
- Gregor Jordan
- Kimberley Joseph

Back to top

== K ==
- Nik Kacevski
- Pip Karmel
- Rupert Kathner
- Brian Kavanagh
- Christopher Kay
- Stavros Kazantzidis
- Haydn Keenan
- Alex Kelly
- Chris Kennedy
- Jo Kennedy
- Christopher Kenworthy
- Peter Kirk
- Ana Kokkinos
- Daniel Krige
- Justin Kurzel
- Ayten Kuyululu

Back to top

== L ==
- Craig Lahiff
- Elise Lamb
- John D. Lamond
- Andrew Lancaster
- Samantha Lang
- Clara Law
- Ben Lawrence
- Denny Lawrence
- Ray Lawrence
- Mark Lee
- Julia Leigh
- Don Levy
- Ben Lewin
- W. J. Lincoln
- J. A. Lipman
- Raymond Longford
- Jai Love
- Richard Lowenstein
- Baz Luhrmann
- Robert Luketic
- Lian Lunson
- Lottie Lyell

Back to top

== M ==
- Dan Macarthur
- Charles MacMahon
- Garnet Mae
- Giorgio Mangiamele
- Anthony Maras
- J. E. Mathews
- Claire McCarthy
- T. O. McCreadie
- Paulette McDonagh
- Francine McDougall
- J. P. McGowan
- Neil McGregor
- Luke McKay
- Jackie McKimmie
- Dee McLachlan
- Greg McLean
- Don McLennan
- James McTeigue
- Gaston Mervale
- Jonathan Messer
- Selina Miles
- David Michôd
- George Miller
- George T. Miller
- Anthony Mir
- Roger Mirams
- Tracey Moffatt
- Noel Monkman
- Jocelyn Moorhouse
- Philippe Mora
- Judy Morris
- Kris Moyes
- Russell Mulcahy
- Maurice Murphy
- Mervyn Murphy
- Scott Murray
- Tom Murray (filmmaker)
- Bruce Myles

Back to top

== N ==
- Christopher Nelius
- Arch Nicholson
- Chris Noonan
- Cherie Nowlan
- Phillip Noyce

Back to top

== O ==
- Michael Offer
- George Ogilvie
- Morgan O'Neill
- Chris Owen

Back to top

== P ==
- Martyn Park
- David Parker
- Puven Pather
- Scott Patterson
- Michael Pattinson
- Karen Pearlman
- Rachel Perkins
- David Perry
- Dein Perry
- Michael Petroni
- John Polson
- John Power
- Ian Pringle
- Andrew Prowse
- Alex Proyas
- Leah Purcell

Back to top

== Q ==
- Ken Quinnell

Back to top

== R ==
- Peter Rasmussen
- Gregory J. Read
- Oscar Redding
- Kimble Rendall
- Cloudy Rhodes
- James Ricketson
- Lee Robinson
- Melanie Rodriga
- Tony Rogers
- Alfred Rolfe
- Daniel Ross
- Michael James Rowland
- Richard Roxburgh
- Paramita Roy
- John Ruane
- Michael Rubbo
- Michael Rymer

Back to top

== S ==
- Sinem Saban
- Henri Safran
- David Sander
- Tony Sarre
- Mark Savage
- Matthew Saville
- Lucien Savron
- Fred Schepisi
- Roger Scholes
- Carl Schultz
- Dean Semler
- Ivan Sen
- Yahoo Serious
- Anupam Sharma
- Jim Sharman
- Don Sharp
- Jan Sharp
- Frank Shields
- Cate Shortland
- Jeremy Sims
- Rob Sitch
- Tim Slade
- Beaumont Smith
- Kathy Smith
- John V. Soto
- Harry Southwell
- Macario De Souza
- Rohan Spong
- Kriv Stenders
- Goran Stolevski
- Brett Sullivan
- Peter Sykes
- Brian Syron
- Partho Sen-Gupta
- Antony Szeto

Back to top

== T ==
- Simon Target
- Nadia Tass
- John Tatoulis
- Enzo Tedeschi
- Jonathan Teplitzky
- Murali K. Thalluri
- Andrew Thatcher
- Albie Thoms
- Michael Thornhill
- Warwick Thornton
- F. W. Thring
- Alkinos Tsilimidos
- Sophia Turkiewicz
- Ann Turner
- Jessica M. Thompson

Back to top

== U ==
- Andrew Upton
- Victor Upton-Brown

Back to top

== V ==
- David Vadiveloo
- Samuel Van Grinsven
- Karl von Möller

Back to top

== W ==
- Stephen Wallace
- James Wan
- Sarah Watt
- Dunstan Webb
- Christopher Weekes
- Peter Weir
- Eddie White
- Georgina Willis
- George Willoughby
- Rebel Wilson
- Simon Wincer
- Paul Winkler
- Richard Wolstencroft
- Kate Woods
- Rowan Woods
- Geoffrey Wright

Back to top

== Y ==
- Aden Young
- George Young

Back to top

== Z ==
- Karl Zwicky

Back to top

== See also ==
- Cinema of Australia
