= Wisconsin Center for Film and Theater Research =

American archive of research materials

- Established: 1960
- Headquarters: 816 State Street; Madison, Wisconsin 53706
- Coordinates: 43.0752°N 89.4°W
- Website: wcftr.commarts.wisc.edu

The Wisconsin Center for Film and Theater Research (WCFTR) is a major archive of motion picture, television, radio, and theater research materials. Located in the headquarters building of the Wisconsin Historical Society in Madison, Wisconsin, the WCFTR holds over three hundred collections from motion picture, television, and theater writers, producers, actors, designers, directors, and production companies. These collections include business records, personal papers, scripts, photographs, promotional graphics, and some twenty thousand films and videotapes of motion picture and television productions.

The WCFTR is regularly visited by researchers from around the world.

== History ==
In 1955, the Wisconsin Historical Society established the Mass Communications History Center to document the importance of journalism, broadcasting, advertising, and public relations in the United States. Recognizing that initiative's value, the University of Wisconsin's Speech and Theater Department formed the Wisconsin Center for Film and Theater Research in 1960. Today the WCFTR is part of the university's Communication Arts Department and is operated in partnership with the Wisconsin Historical Society.

== Film ==
The film collection contains a variety of American and international cinema with rich holdings of Hollywood films from the 1930s to the 1960s, independent films from the 1960s to the 1980s, post-World War II Soviet films from the 1950s to the 1970s, and Taiwanese films from the late 1970s to the 1990s. Highlights of the film collection include

- 2,000 16mm reference prints of Warner Brothers, RKO and Monogram Pictures films—nearly every feature released between 1931 and 1949
- 1500 Vitaphone short subjects
- 300 Looney Tunes and Merrie Melodies cartoons from 1926 to 1949
- 270 Soviet features and documentaries
- 120 Taiwanese features
- films by independent filmmakers including Shirley Clarke, Wendy Clarke, Emile de Antonio, Lionel Rogosin, Richard Kaplan, Jill Godmilow, Lewis Jacobs, Richard James Allen and Karen Pearlman

Complementing the films are paper records usually organized by the donor's name. Prominent examples include these collections:

- Dalton Trumbo: Papers of a motion picture scriptwriter, one of the Hollywood Ten, who was imprisoned following the 1947 House Committee on Un-American Activities hearings, documenting his work and his blacklisting. Screenplays include those written for the black market including The Brave One (1956)—for which he won an Academy Award under the pseudonym Robert Rich—Exodus (1960), Lonely Are the Brave (1962), The Young Philadelphians (1959), and Spartacus (1960).
- Paddy Chayefsky: Papers of a writer for stage, screen, radio, and television, whose work in the early years of American television led to his winning three Academy Awards for films. The collection includes titles produced in both television and film notably The Bachelor Party and Marty, originally presented on NBC's Philco Television Playhouse and then made into motion pictures by United Artists.
- George Seaton: Papers of a Hollywood writer and director, including scripts and drafts, research notes, correspondence, financial records, cast and crew lists, production reports, shooting schedules, and reviews. Among the films documented are the Marx Brothers comedies A Night at the Opera (1935) and A Day at the Races (1937) and the dramas The Song of Bernadette (1943), Miracle on 34th Street (Academy Award, 1947), The Bridges at Toko-Ri (1954), The Country Girl (Academy Award, 1954), and Airport (1970).
- Walter Mirisch: Records of various films and television series produced by Mirisch or his company. The files include shooting scripts, stills, advertising and publicity kits, films, sound recordings, and set and costume designs in varying degrees for The Apartment (Academy Award, 1960), The Children's Hour (1962), The Great Escape (1963), Hawaii (1966), How To Succeed in Business Without Really Trying (1967), In the Heat of the Night (Academy Award, 1967), Irma La Douce (Academy Award, 1963), The Magnificent Seven (1960), The Pink Panther (Academy Award, 1964), The Russians Are Coming, the Russians Are Coming (1966), Some Like It Hot (Academy Award, 1959), and West Side Story (Academy Award, 1961), among others.
- Kirk Douglas: Papers of a motion picture actor consisting of scripts, correspondence, and contracts for films in which he appeared or that he produced including Champion (1949), The Glass Menagerie (1950), Ace in the Hole (1951), Detective Story (1951), The Bad and the Beautiful (1952), The Big Sky (1952), Lust for Life (1956), Twenty Thousand Leagues Under the Sea (1954), Paths of Glory (1957), Gunfight at the OK Corral (1957), The Vikings (1958), Spartacus (1960), Strangers When We Meet (1960), and Seven Days in May (1964), among others. It also includes extensive archival material of Douglas' film production company Bryna Productions.
- Warner Brothers Scripts (United Artists Series 1.2): Scripts and related materials for Warner Brothers motion picture productions pre-1950, amounting to 449 archives boxes.
- Edith Head: Papers of the Academy Award winning costume designer including watercolor, pen and ink, and pencil sketches, many with notes about fabrics and costs for All About Eve (1950), Sabrina (1954), To Catch a Thief (1955), The Ten Commandments (1956), Vertigo (1958), Breakfast at Tiffany's (1961), Girls, Girls, Girls (1962), Hud (1963,) The Nutty Professor (1963), and Sex and the Single Girl (1964), among others, as well as bespoke dress designs for Bette Davis, Grace Kelly, Natalie Wood, Joan Crawford, Janet Leigh, Greer Garson, Lucille Ball, Deborah Kerr, Joan Fontaine, and Hedy Lamarr.
- Dorothy Jeakins: Papers of the Academy Award winning costume designer including sketches, photographs, cloth samples, wardrobe plots, and cost calculations. Among the films documented are Green Mansions (1959), Hawaii (1966), The Music Man (1962), Oliver (1968), The Sound of Music (1965), The Way We Were (1973), and Night of the Iguana (1964).

== Television ==
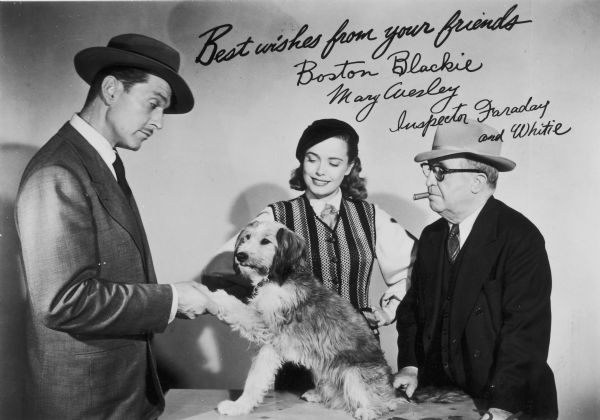
Boston Blackie (played by Kent Taylor), Mary Wesley (Lois Collier), and Inspector Faraday (Frank Orth), the cast of Boston Blackie, pose with Whitey the Dog in a 1951 promotional photograph for Ziv Television Programs. WCFTR Television Title Collection

The largest of the WCFTR television collections consists of 3500 shows produced by Ziv Television Programs, the most successful producer of action/adventure programming filmed for first-run syndication from 1948-1962. The Ziv library includes viewing copies and printing elements for every episode of The Cisco Kid, Boston Blackie, I Led Three Lives, Highway Patrol, Sea Hunt, Ripcord, Bat Masterson, and thirty one other series. Scripts, production, and promotional materials for these and additional Ziv series can also be examined at the WCFTR.

Television pioneers whose careers are documented at the WCFTR include David Susskind, Fred Coe, Reginald Rose, Alvin Boretz, Paddy Chayefsky, and Loring Mandel, among others. More recent collections include the Papazian-Hirsch Entertainment and Steven Starr collections. Highlights include

- Ed Sullivan: The collection of the writer and television host includes scripts, production files, clippings, and correspondence for the long-running Ed Sullivan Show (1948-1971) with 16mm film of 48 entire programs and 29 additional reels of excerpts.
- Rod Serling: The collection of the writer and producer contains paper records from every phase of his career in radio, television, and film, but the largest portion covers the television series he wrote or produced including synopses, outlines, scripts, revisions, press releases, and correspondence for The Armstrong Circle Theatre, The Bob Hope Chrysler Theatre, Climax, The Hallmark Hall of Fame, Kraft Theatre, The Loner, Lux Video Theatre, Motorola Television Hour, Playhouse 90, Rod Serlings's Wonderful World of..., Studio One, The Twilight Zone, and The United States Steel Hour.
- Nat Hiken: The collection of the writer and producer includes films of many episodes of The Phil Silvers Show (Sergeant Bilko) and scripts and films for Car 54, Where Are You?, along with material from other programs such as the Martha Ray Show.
- Hal Kanter: The collection of the writer, producer, and director contains scripts, production files, correspondence, and fan mail for All in the Family, Bob Hope's Chrysler Theatre, Chico and the Man, Julia, and numerous specials and Academy Award presentations.
- Sy Salkowitz: The collection of the writer and producer with production notes and scripts for Ironside, It Takes a Thief, M*A*S*H, Naked City, The Paper Chase, Perry Mason, Police Story, and The Virginian, among others.
- Sidney Sheldon: The collection of the writer and producer includes scripts and other production materials for The Patty Duke Show, I Dream of Jeannie, and Nancy.
- Irna Phillips: The collection of the prodigious creator and writer of soap operas includes production notes, scripts, and correspondence for Another World, As the World Turns, The Brighter Day, and Guiding Light, among others.

== Theater ==
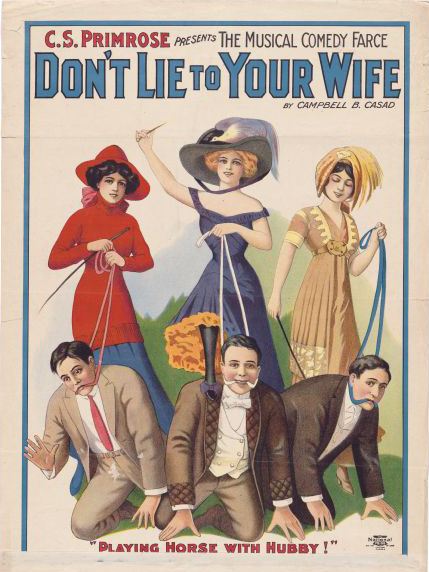
Color lithograph poster for the 1912 musical comedy farce "Don't Lie to Your Wife." WCFTR Poster Collection

Collections have been established by actors such as Alfred Lunt, Lynn Fontanne, Melvyn Douglas, Kitty Carlisle, Hal Holbrook and playwrights including S. N. Behrman, Moss Hart, Langston Hughes, George S. Kaufman, Walter Kerr, Jean Kerr, Howard Lindsay, Joseph Stein, Russel Crouse, N. Richard Nash, Paul Osborn, and Dale Wasserman.

Collections of composers and lyricists include those of Marc Blitzstein, Sheldon Harnick, and Stephen Sondheim. The WCFTR also houses collections from the costume, set, and lighting designers Dorothy Jeakins, Gilbert Vaughn Hemsley, Jr., and Jean Rosenthal.

The Center also holds the papers of the Playwrights' Company, a production company founded by Maxwell Anderson, Sidney Howard, Elmer Rice, Robert Sherwood, and S. N. Behrman. The behind-the-scene realities of Broadway theater of the 1940s, 1950s, and 1960s are documented in collections of producers and directors such as Kermit Bloomgarden, Hillard Elkins, Herman Levin, David Merrick, and Dwight Deere Wiman.

== Radio ==
Although the WCFTR is not primarily an archive of radio, many of its collections were donated by writers, producers, and actors—such as Nat Hiken, Rod Serling, Alvin Boretz, Irna Phillips, and William Spier—who were active in radio production in addition to their involvement with television, motion pictures, or the theater. As a result, the WCFTR holds collections touching on radio production in the 1940s, 1950s, and 1960s. The collections contain some sound recordings, but paper records predominate, including hundreds of scripts for radio productions. Here is a sample of radio programs for which there are scripts in the collections: The Adventures of Sam Spade, The Adventures of Superman, The Aldrich Family, America in the Air, Best Plays, The Beulah Show, The Big Story, Big Town, Cavalcade of America, The Chesterfield Supper Club, The Clock, Dimension X, Dr. Sixgun, Escape, Ford Theatre, The Fred Allen Show, The Grouch Club, Haven of Hope, Hollywood Love Story, Yours Truly, Johnny Dollar, Kay Thompson and Company, Magazine Theater, The Marriage, Modern Tales of Hoffman, My Secret Story, NBC Theatre, NBC University Theatre, Nick Carter—Master Detective, Philip Morris Playhouse, Prudential Family Hour of Stars, Rooftops of New York, The Shadow, Star Spangled Theatre, Suspense, The Theatre Guild on the Air, United Nations Radio, Up for Parole, Woman in Love, and X Minus One, among many others.

== Photographs and promotional materials ==
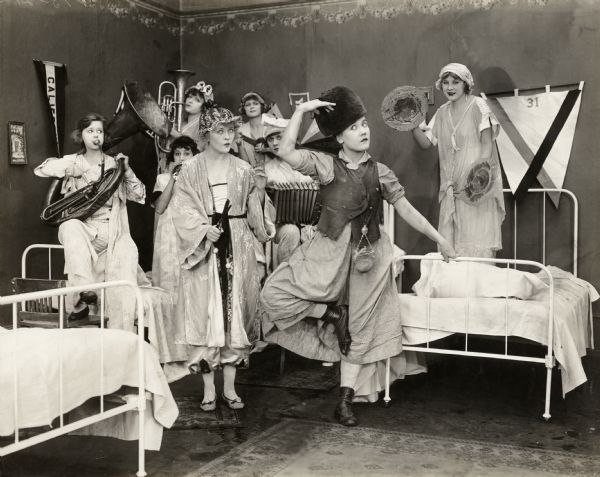
Scene still from a Mack Sennett Comedy, probably "Those Athletic Girls" of 1918. Louise Fazenda does a Russian dance and left of her is Phyllis Haver holding a curling iron. WCFTR Film Title Collection.

The WCFTR has millions of still photographs, photographic negatives, posters, pressbooks, playbills, clippings, and scrapbooks, organized into four major groups to provide pictorial documentation of the production, distribution, and exhibition of motion pictures, television broadcasts, and theatrical plays.

- The Film Title Collection contains promotional graphics from over 40,000 domestic and foreign motion pictures from the 1890s to the present. Major U.S. studios are represented, with extensive coverage of publicity for the films released by United Artists, MGM, Warner Brothers, Universal, and Monogram studios from the 1920s to the 1950s.
- The Television Title Collection consists of stills and ephemera from over 1,700 American television productions. Programs from the pre-videotape era, the late 1940s through the early 1960s, are most thoroughly documented.
- The Theater Title Collection contains pictorial documentation of the American stage from the 1860s until today. More than 2,888 plays are represented of productions from the local repertory stage to Broadway.
- The Name Collection consists of publicity and personal photographs, clipping files, and other ephemera related to more than 14,000 individual motion picture, television, and theater performers, as well as a limited number of producers, directors, writers, and studio executives.

A selection of photographs of Broadway and silent film productions and actors, mostly from the 1890s to 1922 can be viewed online at the Wisconsin Historical Images section of the Wisconsin Historical Society website. Color lithographed posters for touring theatrical productions from the 1870s to the 1910s, such as the poster for "Don't Lie to Your Wife" shown above, are also available there.

== Media Digital History Library ==
The Media Digital History Library seeks to digitize historic film industry trade papers and fan magazines that are now in the public domain. Sources for original copies (rather than microfilmed or microfiched copies) included the Museum of Modern Art Library, Academy of Motion Picture Arts and Sciences' Margaret Herrick Library, and private collectors. The scans are hosted on the Internet Archive. The library's catalog search and citation platform is called Lantern. The project was first created by David Pierce in 2009.

== See also ==
- International Federation of Film Archives
- List of film archives
