= Alfred Oscar Lawrence =

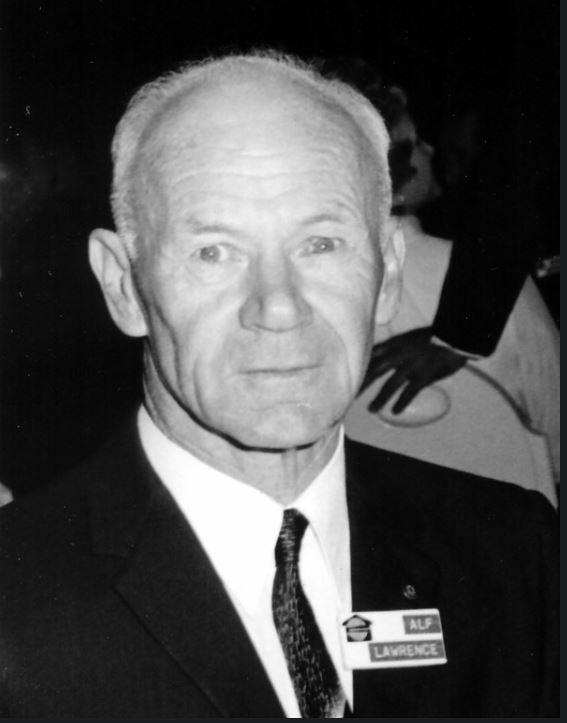
Alfred Oscar Lawrence was Chairmen of the Forests Commission Victoria between 1956 and 1969

Alfred (Alf) Oscar Platt Lawrence, OBE was an outstanding Victorian forester and community leader.

Alf Lawrence was born in the Melbourne suburb of Elsternwick on 20 July 1904, the son of Robert Platt Lawrence and Elizabeth Malvina, née Davis. Alf's family were of modest means but he won a scholarship to attend University High School in Parkville. He later won a tertiary scholarship to study at the Victorian School of Forestry (VSF) at Creswick in 1920.

== Early career ==
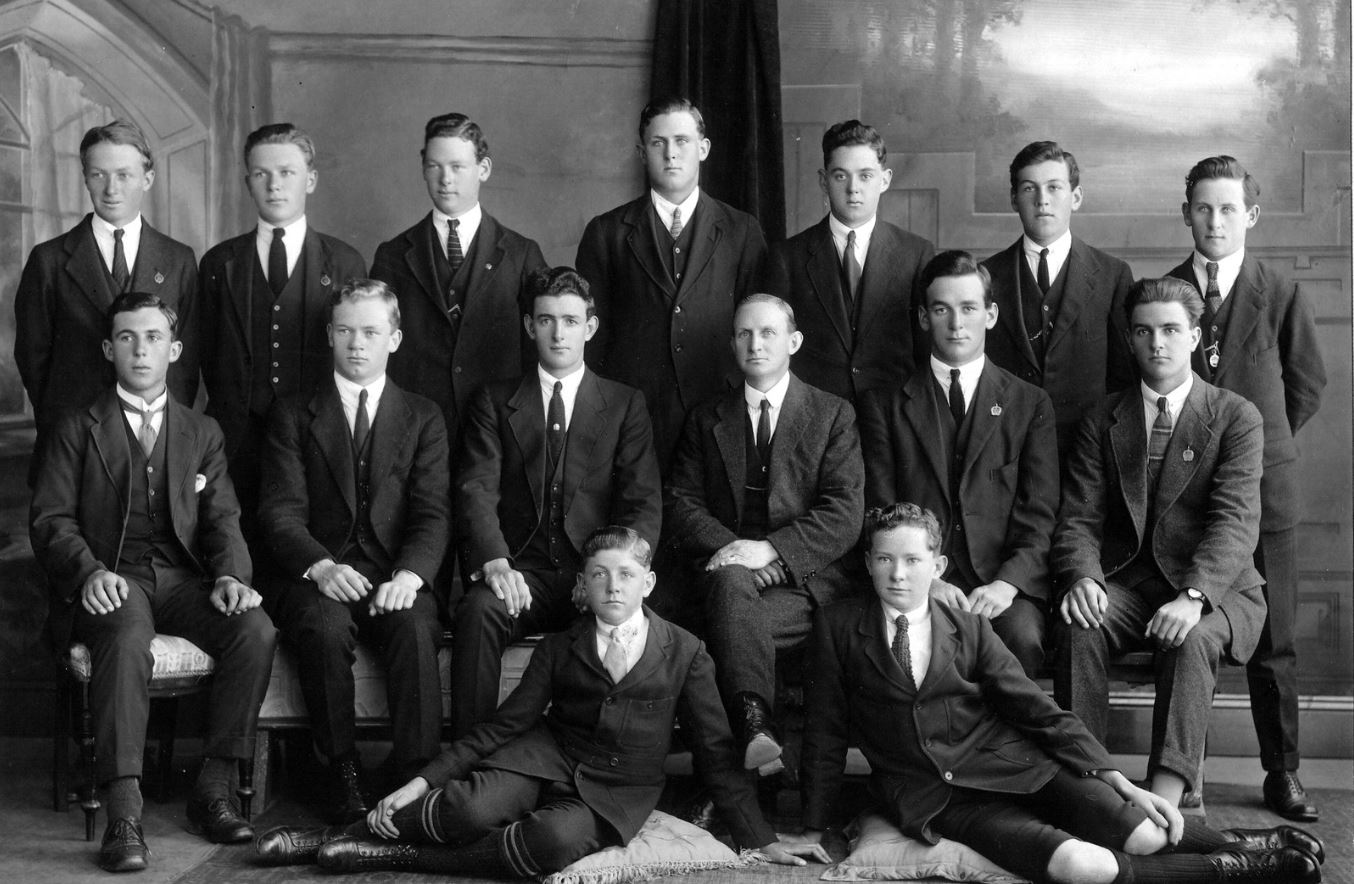
Alfred Oscar Lawrence - graduated from the Victorian School of Forestry in 1922. Lawrence sitting second from the left.

After graduating from VSF with a Diploma of Forestry in 1922 Alf Lawrence was appointed as a cadet forester with the Forests Commission Victoria (FCV) with his first country postings to Bright and Beaufort in 1923.

An Australian Forestry School (AFS) was first mooted in 1916 and later established, initially in Adelaide in 1926, before moving to the Canberra in 1927 under the Commonwealth Department of National Development. Sixteen students, including Alf Lawrence, representing all states, were enrolled as the first intake to the fledgling School at Adelaide University in 1926 under Principal Norman William Jolly, with their second year at a newly established campus in the Canberra suburb of Yarralumla under Charles Edward Lane-Poole. Alf Lawrence later completed his studies on a part-time basis back at Adelaide to qualify for a Bachelor of Forest Science in 1928.

However, Victoria withdrew from the acrimonious arrangement with the AFS after 1930 to instead focus on its own VSF forestry school at Creswick and also build a long term relationship with the University of Melbourne.

After returning to the Forests Commission Alf Lawrence undertook inventory work in the red gum forests along the Murray River. These forests near Barmah and Gunbower Island were a hive of activity producing durable sleepers for the expanding Victorian railway network. However, the heady days of the paddle steamers like the Alexander Arbuthnot plying the river trade hauling logs on barges to company sawmills at places like Koondrook were coming to an end. The purchase of the paddle steamer Hero by the Forests Commission occurred in 1942 during the War to transport much needed firewood on barges to Echuca and then by rail to Melbourne.

Later in 1930, Alf worked in the Ballarat goldfields area where he prepared detailed and highly regarded harvesting maps and plans.

In 1934-35 Alf Lawrence was able to travel to Oxford to study for a Diploma of Forestry at the Imperial Forestry Institute on the prestigious Russell Grimwade Prize. Returning from England as one of the most highly qualified foresters in Victoria, he took a more operational role as District Forester at Ballarat and Creswick.

== 1939 Bushfires ==
The Black Friday bushfires on 13 January 1939 where nearly 2 million hectares burnt, 69 sawmills were destroyed, 71 people died and several towns were entirely obliterated became a landmark in the history of the State of Victoria and a major turning point in the story of the Forests Commission. During 1939, Alf Lawrence appeared, along with many other witnesses from the Forests Commission, to give evidence at Judge Leonard Edward Stretton's Royal Commission into the devastating bushfires. Lawrence was the President of the Victorian State Foresters Association (VSFA) at the time and later wrote in 1950 of the staff morale during that period:

"they were totally dispirited - their work of years lay in ashes... all the protection, planning and works had proved futile" ...... Alf Lawrence - 1950

In December 1939, in the wake of the disastrous bushfires, Lawrence replaced Reginald Edward Torbet to become the Commission's Chief Fire Officer, and immediately set about the huge challenge of rebuilding a highly organised and motivated fire fighting force, lifting staff morale, introducing RAAF fire spotting aircraft, fire towers, modern vehicles and equipment such as powered pumps, as well as a statewide radio communications network, VL3AA.

As a consequence of Judge Stretton's scathing report, the Forests Commission gained additional funding and took responsibility for fire protection on all public land including State forests, unoccupied Crown Lands and National Parks plus a buffer extending one mile beyond their boundaries on to private land and its responsibilities grew from 2.4 million to 6.5 million hectares.

Further disastrous fires at Yallourn in 1944 led to another Royal Commission headed by Judge Stretton. One major recommendation was the formation of the Country Fire Authority (CFA) of Victoria and Alf Lawrence was appointed as a Board Member of the new organisation from 1946 to 1949.

== Commissioner and Chairman ==
After the sudden death of Alfred Vernon Galbraith, in 1949 the Victorian State Government appointed Lawrence as one of the three commissioners to lead the Forests Commission joining with new Chairman Finton George Gerraty and Charles Montgomery Ewart. Gerraty died suddenly on 25 June 1956 during a difficult period for the Commission, amidst serious allegations of financial mismanagement of its Newport seasoning works, and after some delay, Lawrence was finally elevated to Chairman in December 1956, a position he held until his retirement in July 1969.

During the next twelve years of his Chairmanship, the Forests Commission oversaw a major plantation expansion (PX) program in conjunction with the Commonwealth Government, a new Royalty Equation system for Sawlogs in 1950, and restructuring the small head office cadre and much larger number of field staff into 56 geographic forest districts, grouped into 7 larger divisions in 1956. This structure proved robust and remained largely intact for another 30 years. He later oversaw a major revision of the forest legislation in 1958. During the tenure of his chairmanship, Lawrence had several Commissioners supporting him including Charles Montgomery Ewart, Herbert Duncan Galbraith, Andrew Leonard (Ben) Benallack, Dr Francis (Frank) Robert Moulds and Charles William Elsey.

Amongst his numerous board and committee appointments, he became the first president of the Conservation Council of Victoria.

A member of his local Masonic Lodge, Melbourne Rotary and the Institute of Foresters of Australia (IFA), and from 1955 Lawrence occupied various leadership positions with the Victorian Boy Scouts, including Deputy Chief Commissioner in 1968.

The pinnacle of his career came on Queens Birthday, 14 June 1969, when Alf Lawrence was honoured with a civil Order of the British Empire (OBE) for his outstanding services to forestry and scouting.

Alf Lawrence retired the day before his 65th birthday on Saturday 19 July 1969 after a career spanning nearly 50 years since entering the Victorian School of Forestry as a 16-year-old student with his last official duty to open new facilities at the Korweinguboora Recreation Reserve nestled in the Wombat State Forest. Frank Moulds was then appointed Chairman of the Forests Commission Victoria.

He remained active in many organisations after his retirement and died on 15 March 1986, aged 81.
