= University High School, Melbourne =

Secondary school in Melbourne, Australia

The University High School

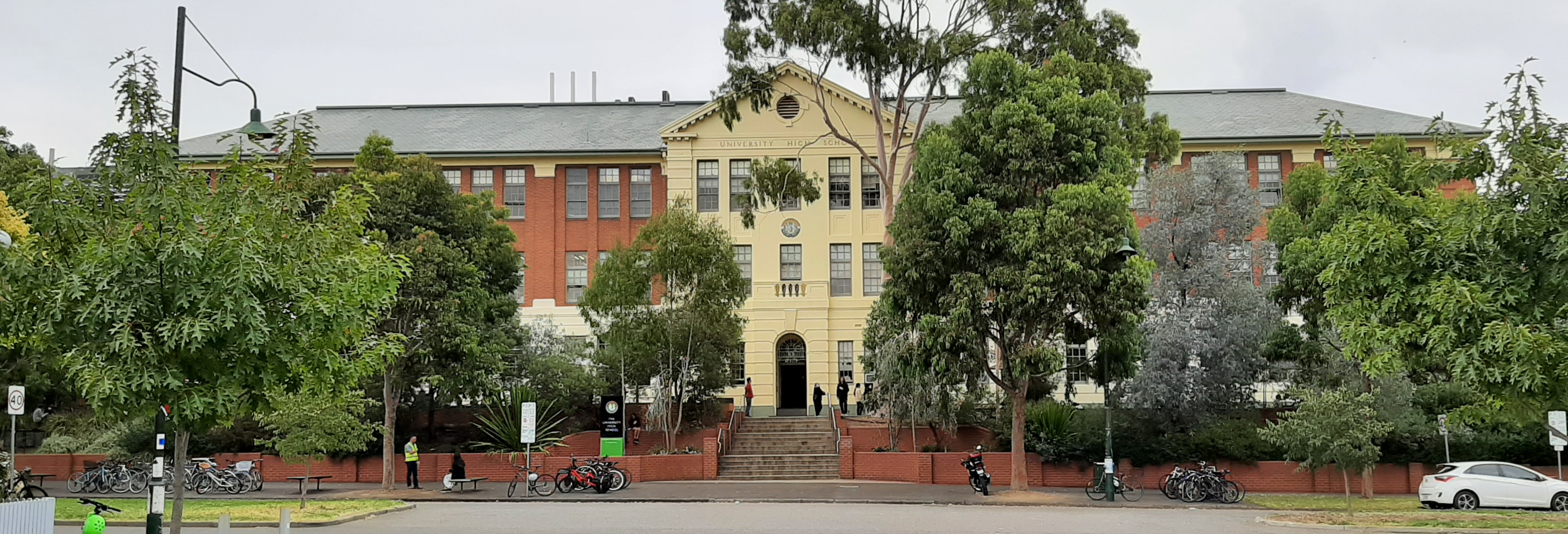
- North Building

Location
- 77 Story Street, Parkville, Victoria; Australia; 37°47′50″S 144°57′19″E

Information
- Type: Government-funded co-educational secondary day school
- Motto: Latin: Strenue Ac Fideliter (With Zeal and Loyalty)
- Established: 1910; 116 years ago
- Principal: Nick Scott
- Years: 7–12
- Enrolment: 1,915 (2024)
- Houses: Coleman; Gulam; Johnston; Triggs
- Colours: Green, white and orange
- Website: unihigh.vic.edu.au

The University High School (abbreviated as UHS or Uni High) is an Australian government-funded and co-educational secondary day school in the suburb of Parkville, Victoria. As of 2024, the school has over 1,900 students and is experiencing high demand for new enrolments. As a result, the Victorian Department of Education only allows students inside the designated school zone to be admitted.

== History and tradition ==
The University High School traces its origins to 1910 when it was established in Carlton as the University Practising School, associated with The University of Melbourne's teacher training program. It initially occupied a refurbished primary school building on Lygon Street, Carlton, with the dual role of educating secondary students and training Diploma of Education candidates from the university.

When World War I broke out in 1914, dozens of senior students and recent graduates volunteered to enlist, and a number of teachers also joined the armed forces.

By 1929, the school moved to a new purpose-built campus, in Story Street, Parkville, where it still is. The historic main building (opened 1930) is now heritage-listed on the Victorian Heritage Register.

During World War II, the school's oval was requisitioned as a camp for United States Army troops, and students from MacRobertson Girls' High School were temporarily accommodated at University High when their own school was also occupied by military personnel.

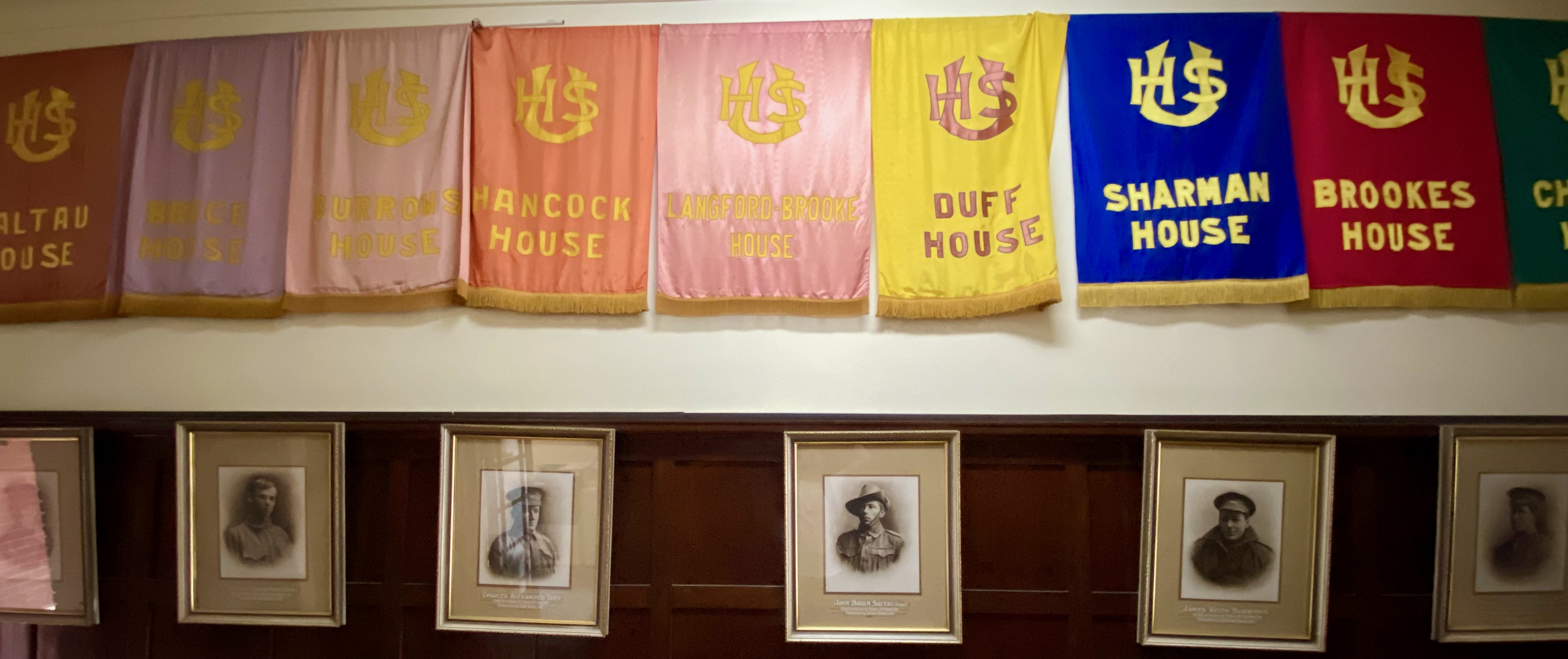
Portraits of students who served in WWI and banners of the former school houses on display

The student population continued to expand after World War II. To meet this demand, in 1960 plans were drawn up to continue expanding the campus including the construction of a hall, gymnasium, and associated facilities. The proposed additions were subsequently completed in 1965. In 1981, Uni High pioneered an acceleration program for gifted students, one of the first programs of its kind in Australia.

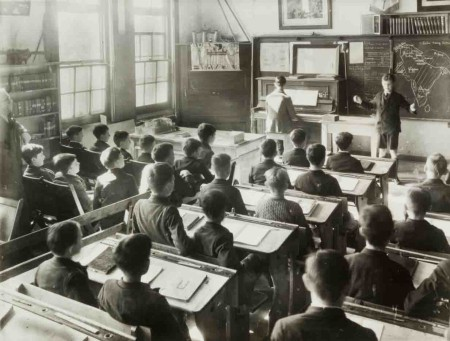
University High School students in a history class, 1930s

To commemorate the fiftieth anniversary of the school, in 1960, it published its first formal history, under the title A City Built to Music: The History of University High School, 1910–1960, a volume that documented the schools foundation, growth and early traditions. Half a century later, on the occasion of its centenary in 2010, a second official history was commissioned from historian Caroline Rasmussen and published as A Whole New World: 100 Years of Education at The University High School. This latter work covered the evolution of the school across an entire century. This text also reflected on the place of the school within the city that had developed around it.

== Student life and culture ==
The school does not have a uniform, an uncommon policy among Australian secondary schools. Students wear appropriate attire of their choice.

The school has clubs and activities. Lunchtimes typically feature games in the library, environmental gardening, robotics club, dance rehearsals, and meetings of academic, creative and special-interest groups.

The student-produced magazine is Ubique (pronounced oo-bee-kweh), first published in 1946.

== House structure ==
The school is divided into four houses, each with its own colour, name and student leadership team. In 2018, the houses were renamed to honour alumni. The four houses are:

- Coleman – named after John Coleman, Australian footballer
- Gulam – named after academic, Hyder Gulam
- Johnston – named after Emma Johnston, former Vice Chancellor of Melbourne University
- Triggs – named after Gillian Triggs, former president of the Australian Human Rights Commission

== Academics ==
Uni High seeks to maintain a reputation for academic excellence. The 2024 academic year reinforced this tradition with the largest graduating Year 12 cohort in the school’s history.

- 11 students achieved an ATAR of 99 or higher, with two students sharing the position of Dux on an ATAR of 99.9.
- 90 students (28.7%) achieved an ATAR of 90 or above.
- The median ATAR was 80.3, with 51.3% of students (161 in total) attaining an ATAR of 80 or higher.

Within the Elizabeth Blackburn Sciences program, the school’s selective-entry science stream, 25% of students attained ATARs of 95 or higher, with a mean ATAR of 85.2, underscoring the success of the program in fostering high achievement in STEM.

== Campuses ==
As of 2025, Uni High has two campuses. The (main) campus at 77 Story Street in Parkville caters for Year 7, Year 8, Year 10, Year 11 and Year 12 students. This campus is adjacent to the University of Melbourne and near the Royal Melbourne Hospital, the Peter MacCallum Cancer Centre. The second (new) campus is at 399 Lonsdale Street in Melbourne's Central Business District and is set up for Year 9 students.

=== Lonsdale Street Campus ===
The University High School's Lonsdale Street Campus for Year 9 students was opened in Term 1, 2025, under a seven-year lease by the Victorian Department of Education.

=== Story Street Campus ===
Public transport links at the Story Street campus include the tram route 19 on Royal Parade, and access to the new Parkville train station, with the Metro Tunnel now open. The main campus is made up of several distinct areas.

North Building - At Story Street, the North Building (main building) was constructed in 1930 during the Great Depression. It connects with the West Building and Music Wing, which spans three levels, and contains rooms numbered 100 through 405. It includes offices, classrooms and a performance centre.

South Building - On the opposite side of the courtyard stands the South Building, a four-storey block added and expanded in stages from the 1960s to 2007. This includes the library, classrooms and science laboratories.

West Building - The West Wing is the smallest of the buildings, but is conjoined with the Music Wing. The Music Wing consists of music classrooms, composition classrooms, practice rooms and the Music Office. Rooms in the West and Music wings are numbered as part of the 100s and 200s as they are connected to the North Building.

Portables - In 2021, portable classrooms were added to the campus to increase the school's capacity after the temporary closure (due to fire) of the South Building and the rising student enrolment numbers. There are 12 portables that sit around the perimeter of the oval and they are numbered from rooms 1001 through 1012.

Sharman Hall + Canteen & Gymnasium - Sharman Hall is the school’s assembly and performance hall, used for whole-school gatherings, musicals and public events. The hall is named after a long-serving principal of the school. It adjoins the Gymnasium and Canteen Complex that contains a full indoor sports court (upstairs) and the student canteen and cafeteria area downstairs. The canteen level provides additional indoor seating and locker space. The gymnasium supports court sports and physical education classes.

Art and Technology Building - The Art and Technology Building is a three-storey building (800s and 900s classrooms).

Music Wing - The Music Wing includes a suite of classrooms designed for ensemble rehearsals, theory instruction and music technology, together with a number of sound-proofed practice rooms.

EBS Building - The Elizabeth Blackburn School of Sciences building was opened in 2014. It includes university-style lecture theatres, laboratories, collaborative study areas and its own resource centre.

GTAC Centre - The Gene Technology Access Centre (GTAC) is a genetics and biology laboratory complex built in 2004 in partnership with the Victorian state government and various research institutes. GTAC is occasionally able to be used by Uni High students and is a science outreach facility for school students across Victoria.

== Notable alumni ==
=== Academic ===
- Elizabeth Blackburn, 2009 Nobel Prize Laureate in Physiology or Medicine
- Suzanne Cory, medical biology
- Norman Greenwood
- Emma Johnston, marine ecology
- Richard Charles Mills, economics
- James Mahmud Rice, sociology, winner of the 2009 Stein Rokkan Prize for Comparative Social Science Research
- Ken Simpson, ornithologist
- A. T. S. Sissons, pharmaceutical science
- Terry Speed, statistics
- Louis Waller, law

=== Business and government ===
- Alfred Oscar Lawrence, chairman of the Forests Commission Victoria 1956–1969
- Richard Pratt, businessman and philanthropist

=== Media, entertainment and the arts ===
- Matt Day, actor and filmmaker
- Catherine Deveny, comedy writer, stand-up comedian and columnist for The Age newspaper
- Peter Faiman, producer and director
- Dan Falzon, actor
- Patricia Karvelas, journalist
- Wendy Law Suart, traveller and writer
- Sam Lipski, journalist
- Graeme Lyall, musician
- Leslie P. Newman, former president of Comdance
- Dame Olivia Newton-John, singer and actor
- Bruce Pascoe, writer
- Andreja Pejic, model
- Ruby Rose, MTV VJ and television presenter
- Lucien Savron, theatre and film director
- Noah Taylor, actor
- D. M. Thomas, Cornish writer shortlisted for the 1981 Booker Prize, attended between 1949 and 1951 while living in Melbourne
- Judah Waten, author
- David Williamson, playwright

=== Military ===
- Rupert Balfe, killed at Gallipoli on 25 April 1915, doctor, footballer, athlete
- Maurice Fergusson, Australian army officer during World War I and World War II
- Clifford William King Sadlier, winner of the Victoria Cross

=== Politics and the law ===
- Neil Brown, former federal minister
- Robert Clark, parliamentarian and former Victorian Minister
- Julie Dodds-Streeton, judge of the Supreme Court of Victoria and Federal Court of Australia.
- Betty King, Victorian Supreme Court judge
- Joan Kirner, first female Premier of Victoria
- John So, former Lord Mayor of Melbourne
- Leonard Edward Bishop Stretton, judge and royal commissioner in the State of Victoria
- Gillian Triggs, former president of the Australian Human Rights Commission
- Ralph Willis, former Australian Federal Treasurer

=== Sport ===
- Allen Aylett, former chairman of the VFL/AFL and North Melbourne F.C., All Australian, North Melbourne Best & Fairest, cricketer
- Rupert Balfe, AFL footballer (University FC), also Military (killed in Gallipoli on the landing)
- Neil Balme, former Richmond AFL Footballer, premiership player in 1973 & 1974, Coached Melbourne FC, Football Administrator at Collingwood, Geelong and Richmond.
- George Bazeley, Australian hockey player
- Fraser Brown, AFL footballer (Carlton) 1995 Premiership player for Carlton FC and son of Joyce Brown (Australian Netballer and Coach)
- John Coleman, AFL Legend
- Brent Crosswell, AFL footballer (Carlton, Nth Melbourne and Melbourne)
- Ellvana Curo, Albanian-Australian soccer player
- Owen Davidson, International Tennis Hall of Fame
- Alan Gale, Fitzroy FC, Team of the Century
- Adrian Gallagher, Carlton F.C. Team of the Century, Carlton Best and Fairest, cricketer
- David Glascott, Carlton FC Triple premiership player, also premiership player for Carlton Reserves, U/19's and Night Premiership
- Stuart Glascott, Brisbane Bears AFL footballer (Carlton reserves player and younger brother of David Glascott)
- Bob Keddie, Hawthorn FC Best and Fairest, All Australian
- Pam Kilborn, Olympic medallist
- Col Kinnear, AFL Coach (Sydney Swans), also coached premierships at Carlton FC Reserves and Coburg (VFA)
- Michael Klim, Olympic medallist
- Barry McAuliffe, AFL footballer (Nth Melbourne)
- Georgia Nanscawen, Australian hockey player
- Robert Peterson, AFL footballer (Nth Melbourne)
- Phillip Pinnell, AFL footballer (Carlton & Melbourne). 1970 Carlton premiership player, inaugural coach for Springvale in the VFA
- Jasper Pittard, AFL footballer
- Brady Rawlings, former North Melbourne AFL Footballer
- Ian Robinson, AFL umpire, Australian Football Hall of Fame
- Terry Rodgers, AFL footballer (Essendon)
- Sedat Sir, former Western Bulldogs AFL footballer
- Shannon Watt, former North Melbourne AFL footballer
- Ron Wearmouth, AFL footballer (Collingwood), son of Footscray player Dick Wearmouth
- Keith Wiegard, Fitzroy footballer, Fitzroy FC CEO / president, 1960 Rome Olympian, water polo

=== Others ===
- Jacob Hersant, neo-Nazi, associated with the National Socialist Network and other far-right organisations
- Erin Trudi Patterson, convicted murderer, found guilty of the 2023 triple murder involving a Beef Wellington laced with death cap mushrooms.

== List of principals ==
The principal is Nick Scott.

Officeholder	Period	Notes
Leslie J. Wrigley	1910–1914	First principal
Matthew S. Sharman	1914 – 24 April 1941	Longest serving principal
Leslie R. Brookes	24 April 1941 – 1951	
Robert E. Chapman	1952–1960	
George W. Ellis	1961–1969	
Gordon M. Williamson	1969	
Graeme Hayter	1970–1971	Acting principal
Jack Clark	1972–1985	
Peter D. A. Bryce	1986–1996	
Bronwyn Valente	1997 – 1 April 2005	
Robert Newton	18 April 2005 – 18 September 2015	
Heather Thompson	5 October 2015 – 2020	
Noel Creece	2020 – June 2020	Acting principal
Ciar Foster	June 2020 – April 2025	
Arthur Soumalias	April 2025 – July 2025	Acting principal
Nick Scott	July 2025 –	

== See also ==
- List of high schools in Victoria
