= Leonard Edward Bishop Stretton =

Australian judge

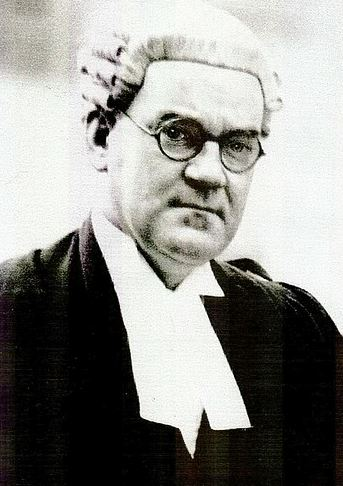
Judge Leonard Edward Bishop (Len) Stretton - circa 1944.

Leonard Edward Bishop (Len) Stretton (1893–1967) was a notable Judge and Royal Commissioner in the State of Victoria, Australia.

== Early life ==
Stretton was born on 10 October 1893 in the Melbourne suburb of Brunswick as one of five children to William John Stretton, and his wife Emma Lydia, née Pye. From an early age Leonard was brought up at the then-rural Campbellfield, north of the city, but the family returned to the suburbs when his father won the Tattersall's Sweepstake in 1902. He was, by his own admission "born only a lifetime after the settlement of Melbourne" and felt at home with working-class people. Leonard attended Moreland State School and University High School at Parkville, and later studied law at the University of Melbourne.

He attempted several times to volunteer for military service during World War One but was prevented for medical reasons.

After graduating from University, Stretton practised for ten years as a solicitor and in 1929 signed the roll as a member of the Victorian Bar. In 1937 he was sworn in as youngest ever County Court Judge.

From 1938 he was involved in the formation of the Workers Compensation Board of Victoria including a role as Chairman.

== 1939 Royal Commission - Black Friday Bushfires ==
The Black Friday bushfires on 13 January 1939 where nearly 2 million hectares burnt, 69 sawmills were destroyed, 71 people died and several towns were entirely obliterated became a landmark in the history of the State of Victoria.

And afterward, before the smoke had even cleared, the blame game began. Then, as now, the row was about burning to keep the bush safe.

The Victorian Premier, Sir Albert Arthur Dunstan appointed Judge Stretton on 25 January 1939 to chair a Royal Commission and hearings began within weeks of the fires into the relationship of people to the forest. More than 200 witnesses gave evidence on 34 sitting days, beginning on 31 January and ending on 17 April, and over 2600 pages of transcript were recorded. Hearings were not only conducted in Melbourne but also where fires had impacted townships like Healesville, Powelltown, Kinglake, Marysville, Colac, Forrest, Lorne as well as far-flung communities such as Omeo. Stretton's questioning was thorough but his final report concluded that "The truth was hard to find” and "Much of the evidence was coloured by self-interest. Much of it was quite false. Little of it was wholly truthful."

Farmers, graziers and bush workers blamed the Forests Commission Victoria as well as the Melbourne and Metropolitan Board of Works (MMBW) for an overly zealous fire-suppression policy. The Commission, in turn, blamed landholders for recklessly setting fires at dangerous times.

After hearing all the evidence at the 1939 Royal Commission, Judge Stretton concluded that, in a sense, everyone and no one was to blame. As one witness put it: "The whole Australian race has a weakness for burning." Judge Stretton highlighted a popular culture of indifference, often carelessness. The report stated that "they had not lived long enough" which pointed to the short experiences and lack of accumulated wisdom of European settlers of the natural rhythms of the Australian bush and how they could never have a full understanding of what might, and did, happen.

He reported that hundreds of small fires smouldered unattended in the week leading up to Black Friday, when, fanned by the gale-force winds, they joined to create the inferno. Most of the fires Stretton declared, with almost biblical gravity, were "lit by the hand of man."

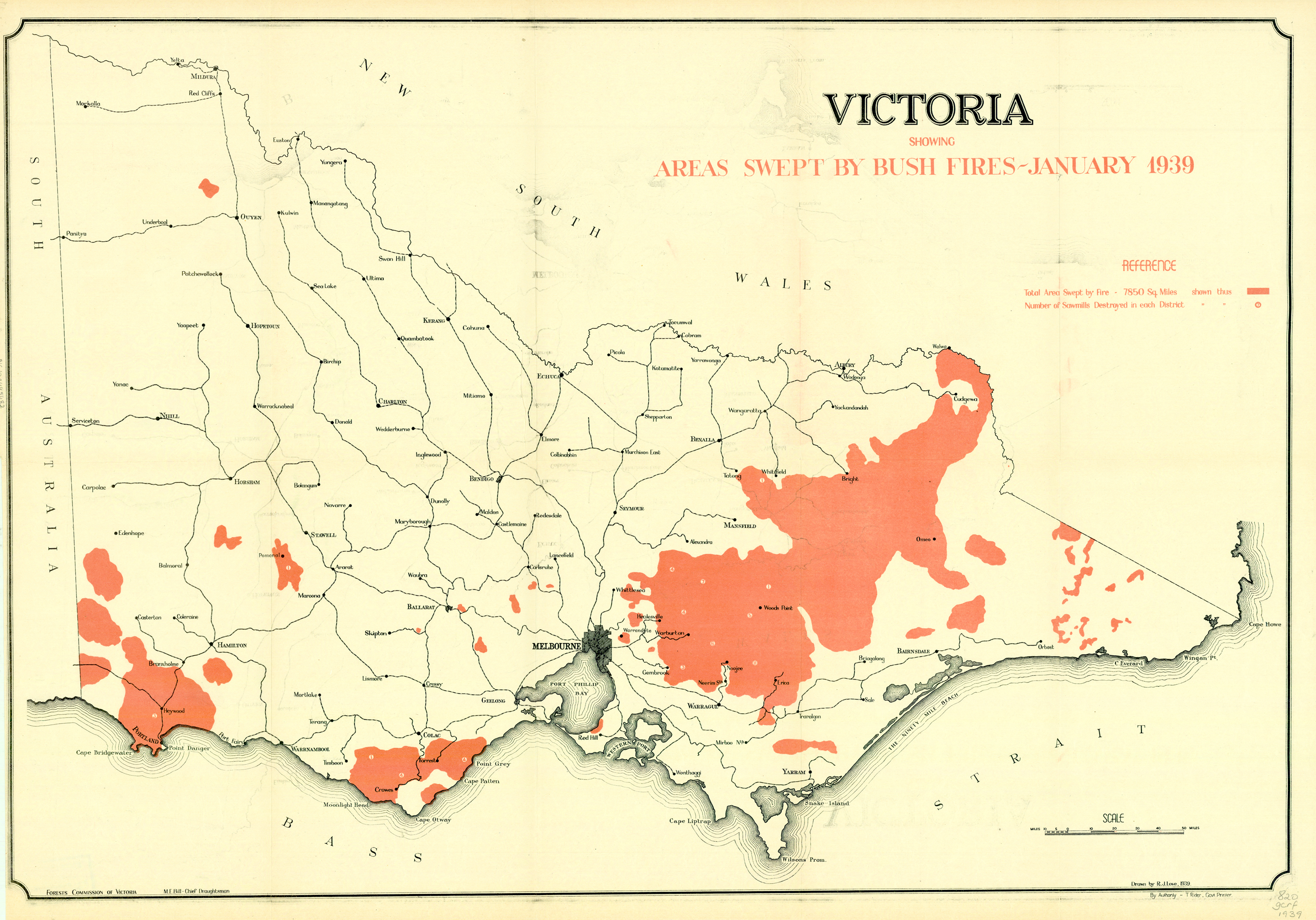
Nearly two million hectares of the State burned on Black Friday 1939. Source: State Library of Victoria.

The Royal Commission conducted by Judge Stretton has been described as one of the most significant inquiries in the history of Victorian public administration.

His scathing 35-page report was presented to the Victorian Parliament on the 16 May 1939 which led to sweeping changes including stringent regulation of burning and fire safety measures for sawmills, grazing licensees and the general public, the compulsory construction of dugouts at forest sawmills, increasing the forest roads network and firebreaks, construction of forest dams, fire towers and RAAF aerial patrols linked by the Forests Commissions radio network VL3AA to ground observers.

The Chairman of the Forests Commission, A.V Galbraith, who Stretton described as “a man of moral integrity” moved quickly and appointed Alf Lawrence as new the Chief Fire Officer, who immediately set about the huge task of rebuilding a highly organised and motivated fire fighting force and implementing many of Strettons recommendations.

The first major initiative from Judge Stretton's recommendations was changes to the Forests Act where the Forests Commission took complete responsibility of fire suppression and prevention on all public land including State forests, unoccupied Crown Lands, MMBW catchments and National Parks plus a buffer extending one mile beyond their boundaries onto private land. The change was huge and the Forests Commissions responsibilities grew in one leap from 2.4 million to 6.5 million hectares.

Stretton also examined the inevitability of fire in the Australian bush and heard evidence from foresters, graziers, sawmillers and academics whether it was best to let fires burn because they were a part of a natural protective cycle or to combat them to defend people and the forests. Importantly, his balanced deliberations officially sanctioned and encouraged fuel reduction burning.

Stretton’s work has been referred to in subsequent bushfire inquiries and Royal Commissions such as Ash Wednesday in 1983 and Black Saturday 2009.

Parts of Stretton’s report are used as a prescribed text for the Victorian VCE.

== 1944 Royal Commission - Yallourn Fires ==
There had been little action on most of the recommendations of Stretton's 1939 report because it had stalled in the Victorian Parliament.

But after a public outcry, Premier Albert Dunstan and Forests Minister Albert Lind decided to ask Judge Stretton to chair a second Royal Commission, this time examining the deadly Yallourn fires in 1944. While there had been other major bushfires during the summer of 1943-44 the Yallourn fire had spread into the nearby opencut coalmine and power station which had threatened Melbourne's electricity supplies.

Stretton's new report once again highlighted a lack of cohesive firefighting ability outside the Melbourne Metropolitan Fire Brigade area which led directly to the creation of the Country Fire Authority (CFA) in December 1944.

The CFA then took responsibility for fire suppression on rural land leaving the Forests Commission to focus on the public land estate. The CFA also took responsibility for supporting existing fire brigades. Prior to the creation of the CFA, the Forests Commission had, to some extent been supporting individual volunteer brigades which had formed across rural Victoria in the preceding decades.

The human and property losses combined with both Stretton’s 1939 and 1944 inquiries shaped and cemented Victoria’s deep-seated approaches towards bushfire. The Forests Commission and CFA adopted clear policies to detect and suppress all bushfires and became very focused and skilled at doing it.

== 1946 Royal Commission - Grazing ==
In 1946, Judge Leonard Stretton, who was by then better known for his inquiries into the 1939 and 1944 bushfires, conducted a Royal Commission into forest grazing and the system of licences. Stretton’s inquiry was at the urging of the Forests Commission which had been expressing strong public concerns, from as early as 1932, about the impacts on upper water catchments of grazing and burning by lease-holder cattlemen.

Stretton identified the inseparable trinity of Forest, Soil and Water, where each one is dependent on the other. Destroy the soil and you destroy the forest and the water. His typically concise 30-page report controversially found that grazing:

- is harmful in mountainous forest lands.
- accelerates soil erosion, and in some cases affects water catchments.
- had been a regular and recurrent cause of forest fires.

Stretton recommended that all grazing licences be managed by the Forests Commission rather than the Lands Department. Furthermore, he was particularly harsh on some graziers, and recommended even stronger measures be instituted where it was shown they could not be trusted. Among his recommendations, was stronger controls on soil conservation on all land, which ultimately led to the formation of the Soil Conservation Authority (SCA) in 1950. The Forests Commission, which had considerable experience in soil stabilisation works, was a strong advocate of the move.

Maisie Fawcett worked closely with Judge Stretton and became the Soil Conservation Board representative, and sole woman, on the Bogong High Plains Advisory Committee, which from 1946 determined the permissible number of cattle and the length of their stay each summer. Under these new policies the number of cattle in the mountains above 4500 feet steadily dropped from 9000 in 1950 to about 3000 in 1970. In 1955 grazing ceased altogether at Mt Bogong, followed in 1958 by Mt Loch, Mt Hotham and Mt Feathertop.

And the soils and vegetation slowly began to recover.

Stretton conducted two more Royal Commissions for the Victorian State Government into electricity supply in 1947 and lastly examining the bread industry 1949.

== 1951 Supreme Court ==
Judge Stretton served as an acting justice of the Supreme Court of Victoria from 1951, but declined an offer to hold that post on a permanent basis. He became known as champion of the underdog and was noted for harsh sentencing for serious crimes but his strong sense of social justice in cases before him.

On 31 May 1956, Stretton was appointed Order of St Michael and St George – Companion (CMG) for his role as Chairman of the Victorian Court of General Sessions.

He retired in August 1964 and died in East Melbourne on 16 May 1967, aged 73.

He was the father of historian Hugh Stretton. His nephew, Alan Stretton led the cleanup in Darwin after Cyclone Tracy.
