= Leslie P. Newman =

Australian ballroom dancer, businessman, company director and arts administrator

Leslie Patrick Gilwell "Les" Newman OAM, FAMI (November 29, 1930 – March 12, 2015) was an Australian professional ballroom dancer, businessman, company director and performing arts administrator. He was regarded as an icon of the dance industry.

== Early life and business career ==
Newman was born in Collingwood, an inner suburb of Melbourne, Australia. He was educated at University High School in Parkville and gained a Bachelor of Commerce degree from Wisconsin University.

For 34 years Les Newman was President of Comdance Inc. He became Chairman of the Australian Dancing Board, President of VicDance Inc., Vice Chairman of the Pacific Council of Dancing and Australian delegate to the World Dance Council and the international DanceSport Council^{[1]}. He was made a Fellow of the Australian Marketing Institute in 1975. He is credited with "quite literally saving the Society" (CSTD) by restoring it to financial stability and then steering it to an unprecedented period of growth and prosperity by expanding its activities and influence beyond Australia and throughout South East Asia and Canada.

Newman is also remembered for his part in creating the hit Australian TV show That's Dancin', which ran on the Australian Broadcasting Corporation (the ABC) between 1989 and 1990, hosted by Paul Newman (no relation) and Maureen Delacy. The series showcased the best amateur and professional dance couples in Australia competing against each other in categories as diverse as Traditional and Modern Ballroom, Jazz, Rap and Rock & Roll. It was a forerunner to later programs like Dancing With The Stars and became the ABC's top rating show ever in the highly competitive Sunday 7.30pm timeslot.

In 1996, he was awarded the Order of Australia Medal (OAM) for services to Dance.

== That's Dancing' TV series ==
Newman was behind the 1989 creation of the pioneering television series, That's Dancin', which ran for three years in prime time throughout Australia on the ABC television network. Filmed in Melbourne's San Remo Ballroom, it was co-produced by FMTV's Brian Finch and Peter Regan. Each episode showcased dance couples in a competitive format, judged by a panel of professional experts. That's Dancin' preceded many similar shows worldwide, such as Dancing with the Stars, Strictly Come Dancing. In 1989, The Age newspaper reported that the show was the ABC's highest rating series ever in the Sunday 7.30pm timeslot. In 1991, it achieved the national broadcaster's largest ever audience against Channel Nine's perennial hit, Hey Hey, it's Saturday.

In 1991, a live version of That's Dancin' toured theatres, concert halls and casinos in every state in Australia and attracted huge audiences. There were typically 5,000 people on the waitlist for tickets to taping sessions of the show, as well as plans to expand the format to a That's Dancin' book and video and, reportedly, negotiations with a U.S. television network to create a local American version of the series when the ABC unexpectedly cancelled it.

Such was the shock that questions were raised in Parliament. The Hon. Dr Marlene Goldsmith:

The ABC is treating the people of Australia with arrogance and contempt. Ballroom dancing is an increasingly popular sport and recreation for the people of Australia, as shown by the remarkably large - for the ABC - audience share which That's Dancin' has obtained in a difficult time slot. Yet the ABC is saying that all these viewers do not matter and that it has no responsibility to cater to their tastes. Surely the rationale for the existence of the ABC is to meet community needs that would otherwise be ignored. It may also have a responsibility to chase ratings, but That's Dancin' is a success on both these counts.... I point out to honourable members that ballroom dancing is not only a sport; it is a social sport that everyone can enjoy. It is a social sport that is increasingly being seen to be enjoyed by more and more people. By not fulfilling its function of meeting the needs of and providing alternative programming for those who cannot see the programs of their choice on commercial stations, the Australian Broadcasting Corporation is denying its mandate; it is not giving taxpayers a return for their dollar. There is absolutely no justification for the ABC's move as the program meets a particular need that is not met elsewhere and it is rated very highly. I am profoundly shocked by the cancellation of the program.

== Legacy and tributes ==
"Les Newman is an icon in the dance industry", wrote Diane Gepps, President, Comdance Inc., "By his retirement from the Presidency we were undoubtedly leader in Dance Teaching and Examinations not just in Australia, but throughout South East Asia.

"... In a world that thrives on drama and theatrics, I never saw him flustered and while he never shied away from dealing with difficult confrontations he did it with composure and authority ... Of all the adjectives to describe Les Newman that have passed through my mind, it is 'integrity' and 'passion' that dominate.

"He was often ahead of his time in being able to recognize future trends and opportunities and most significantly he had the confidence to try them."

In October 2015, Comdance created the Leslie P. Newman Award for Outstanding Service to Dance in his honour, the trophy featuring the Latin inspiration, Discilpina Integriate Passionis (Discipline Integrity Passion); the inaugural winner was Gail Meade.
