= Dan and Bramwell Noah =

Australian film directors, producers, and screenwriters

Dan and Bramwell Noah are Australian film directors, producers, and screenwriters.

Their early works were short films in genres as diverse as the human rights drama Massacre of the Innocents and the magical realism of The Fabled Fable.

According to Ben Adams (their debut feature release) saw the brothers continue in a supernatural vein to tell the story of what happens when the devil in a bad mood meets a gentle madman claiming to be Jesus. The production debuted on the international film festival circuit in Toronto and New York before going on to pick up multiple awards including "Best Narrative Feature" and "Best Drama" at both the Los Angeles Film Awards and at the Mexico International Film Festival. Bramwell Noah (in the role of The Devil) also won "Best Actor" at the ReelHeART International Film and Screenplay Festival. The title role was played by Daniel Schepisi (nephew of director Fred Schepisi.) in his feature film debut.

I, Timon (based on Shakespeare's Timon of Athens) once again saw the brothers achieve international festival award recognition in most main categories (including multiple special jury award prizes). This also included their first win for "Best Screenplay" and two trophies for "Best Actor" (Bramwell Noah in the title role of Timon) at the 2018 American Movie Awards and Los Angeles Movie Awards. Additional nominations included "Best Director" and "Best Cinematography" at the Hoboken International Film Festival and for "Best Musical Score" at the Maverick Movie Awards.

Something To Do With Death premiered at the 2018 ReelHeART International Film and Screenplay Festival in Toronto, where it picked up five nominations and won "Best Foreign Film" (with foreign defined as a non-Canadian produced film). A dark and original take on a man with a past and crime in the blood, the production features Chinese-born actress Lu Yi, Yanik Khoshnow and Bramwell Noah. In 2019 it was an official selection at the Los Angeles Film Awards and a "Best Picture" nominee at the New York Film Awards where Lu Yi picked up the award for "Best Actress".

2022 saw the festival release of Song Without Words - with the tagline "Some robots are more real than others" - and awards for "Direction" and "Leading Actress" (Annie Thorold) at The IndieFEST Film Awards in California. In the same month, the unproduced Bramwell Noah prison drama A Rumour of Angels was announced as an official screenplay selection at the Beverley Hills Film Festival.

Winter as Frida Kahlo, a new and original biopic based on the life of the iconic Mexican painter was released in 2025. Acclaimed as an "unforgettable portrait of love, betrayal, and artistic passion", it features Cheyenne Rae Hernandez in the dual role of Frida and her sister Cristina - and Simon Palomares as the muralist Diego Rivera.
