= George Bazeley =

Australian field hockey player (born 1984)

Personal information
- Nationality: Australian
- Born: 19 January 1984 (age 42) Echuca, Victoria
- Height: 194 cm (6 ft 4 in)

Sport
- Country: Australia
- Sport: Field Hockey
- Event: Men's
- Club: Victorian Vikings
Medal record
Men's field hockey
Representing Australia
World Cup
Gold medal – first place	2010 New Delhi	Team
Champions Trophy
Gold medal – first place	2012 Melbourne	Team

George Bazeley (born 19 January 1984, in Echuca, Victoria) is an Australian field hockey player. He plays the position of goalkeeper. Bazeley is a member of The Kookaburras, the Australia men's national field hockey team. He represents the Victorian Vikings in the Australian Hockey League domestic competition and Uttar Pradesh Wizards in the Hockey India League. He made his international debut in the Australian national team in January 2009 against the Netherlands. He won a gold medal at the 2010 FIH World Cup in Delhi, India. He won 5 consecutive gold medals at the 2009, 2010 and 2011 FIH Hockey Champions Trophy tournaments. He is a member of 2012 Summer Olympics Australian men's national squad and is trying to secure a spot on the team so he can represent Australia at the 2012 Summer Olympics.

== Personal ==
Bazeley was born on 19 January 1984 in Echuca, Victoria. He graduated from University High School, Melbourne in 2001. Bazeley resides in Perth, Australia in order to spend more time with the national team. One of his hobbies is playing golf.

== Field Hockey ==
Bazeley is a goalkeeper. He started playing the sport when he was five years old in Echuca, Victoria. He played junior hockey for the Essendon Hockey Club in Melbourne. In 2009, he was recovering from a knee injury that required surgery.

=== Teams ===
Bazeley plays club hockey for the Hawthorn Hockey Club in Melbourne and the Victoria Park Hockey Club in Perth. He was in goal for the team in a May 2011 match in the Victorian State League 1 competition game against Altona when his side lost 2–1. In 2010/11 he played professional hockey in the Dutch hoofdklasse competition for TMHC Tilburg.

=== National team ===
Bazeley gained the attention of the national team after a coaching change that brought Ric Charlesworth in. He made his debut for The Kookaburras in January 2009. He earned a gold medal at the Men's Hockey Champions Trophy. Prior to the 2010 Commonwealth Games, the coach Ric Charlesworth made getting selection an active competition between Bazeley, Nathan Burgers and Ross Meadows. In May 2011, he was with the team in Perth where they were training. In May 2011, he played in the Azlan Shah Cup for Australia. The Cup featured teams from Pakistan, Malaysia, India, South Korea, Britain and New Zealand. In December 2011, he was named as one of twenty-eight players to be on the 2012 Summer Olympics Australian men's national training squad. This squad will be narrowed in June 2012. He trained with the team from 18 January to mid-March in Perth, Western Australia. In February during the training camp, he played in a four nations test series with the teams being the Kookaburras, Australia A Squad, the Netherlands and Argentina.
