= Christopher Kay =

Australian filmmaker

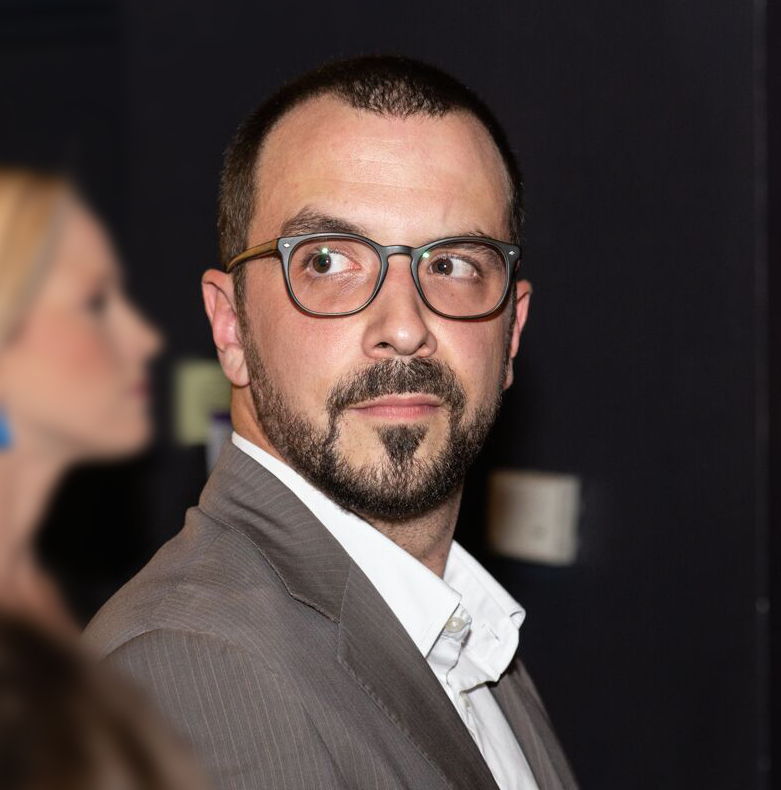
- Kay at the premiere of Just Between Us (2018)
- Occupation(s): Film director, producer, screenwriter, editor
- Website: https://www.christopher-kay.com

Christopher Kay (born 1983) is an Australian film director, producer, screenwriter and editor. He is most known for directing and editing feature film Just Between Us (2018) which featured an ensemble cast including veteran actors Clayton Jacobson and John Jarratt and was praised for its diversity marking Kay as an innovative director. The film also received international attention, obtaining five nominations and winning the Indie Spirit Award at the New Hope Film Festival in Pennsylvania in 2019.

In 2019, he was nominated for an Australian Director's Guild award, and his short concept film Grace (2019) garnered seven international awards and nine nominations. He has previously written, directed, produced and edited several award-winning short films and webisodes across drama and comedy genres, and is head of the production company Door Hinge Films and its affiliates.

In recent years, he has changed his trajectory moving into the documentary genre, and is in production of his documentary feature Anavasi, an inspiring and cinematic look at life's often unanswerable questions through stories of trauma, deprogramming, the collective unconscious and the higher self.

== Select filmography ==
=== Film ===
Year	Title	Director	Producer	Writer	Editor	Notes
2013	Audio Commentary	☒	☒	☒	☒	Winner - Made In Melbourne Film Festival 2013 Bonus Best Film Award Winner - Melbourne Underground Film Festival Audience Favourite Award
2013	Meter	☒	☒	☒	☒	In Competition - St Kilda Film Festival 2014 Top 100 Australian Shorts
2014	Relax & Be Calm	☒	☒	☒	☒	Winner - POP Film Festival 2015 Best Experimental Short
2015	Safe	☒	☒	☒	☒	Shortlisted - Tropfest 2016 Winner - Australian Cinematographer's Society 2016 Bronze Award
2016	First Impressions	☒	☒	☒	☒	
2018	Just Between Us	☒			☒	Winner - New Hope Film Festival 2019 Indie Spirit Award Nominated - New Hope Film Festival 2019 Best Narrative Feature, Best Alternative Feature, Best Foreign Film, Best Comedy Nominated - Australian Director's Guild Awards 2019 Best Direction in a Feature Film In Competition - AACTA Awards 2019 Best Indie Film
2019	Grace	☒	☒	☒	☒	Winner - Los Angeles Film Awards 2020 Best Narrative Film, Best Actor, Best Actress Winner - Top Indie Film Awards 2020 Best Short, Best Director Nominated - Top Indie Film Awards 2020 Best Writing, Best Editing, Best Music Winner - Hollywood North Film Awards 2020 Best Music Nominated - Hollywood North Film Awards 2020 Best Cinematography, Best Writing, Best Performance, Best Supporting Performer Winner Spotlight Short Film Awards 2020 Best Short Film Winner - Global Shorts 2020 Award of Excellence
2020	Loot	☒	☒	☒	☒	
2025	Anavasi	☒	☒	☒	☒	Currently in production
