= Tony Sarre =

Australian filmmaker

Tony Sarre is an Australian filmmaker.

== Early life ==
At age 16, Sarre was told that retinitis pigmentosa, a degenerative eye disease, would send him blind in a year. In addition to his film making efforts, Sarre also notably reached the top four in Australia in tandem cycling and is a black belt in Taekwondo.

== Selected filmography ==
Year	Title	Role	Other notes
2002	Off the Side Lines	script consultant and production assistant	This corporate video was produced to encourage inclusive sports and recreation opportunities for blind students.
2002	Dog's Big Day Out	Writer and director	Public Relations advertisement for the Association for the Blind of Western Australia
2002	Pass the Puppy	Writer and director	Public Relations advertisement for the Association for the Blind of Western Australia
2001	Chung Wa (Middle Way)		A community television (Channel 10) program sponsored by and completed with the involvement of the Chinese community in Perth, Australia
2001	Through Other People's Eyes	Director	Documentary about East Timor
1999	Blackdance	Writer, director	Nominated for six awards and won the prize for Best Script at the 1999 Multimedia Festival.
2001	Miles to Go	Writer, director	Nominated for Best Editing at the Western Australia Screen Awards

== Current activities and future projects ==
In early 2004, Tony became part of a team involved in developing the Inclusive Filmmaking Project. This project involves a series of workshops designed to enable disabled people to learn about the various aspects of film making, including writing, directing, and cinematography.

Two of Tony's films were recently screened at the inaugural international disability film festival, called The Other Film Festival, which was held in Melbourne in early December, 2004.

Currently, Sarre is working on a script for a short film, which will be the true story of a blind hitchhiker who finds himself stranded at a deserted roadhouse in the middle of the Nullarbor Plain. Baking hot by day and freezing cold at night, the hitchhiker is a castaway in an ocean of desert, with few possessions besides his white cane.
