= Eddie Arya =

Australian film director, screenwriter and producer

Arya is an Australian film director, screenwriter, and producer.

Eddie Arya is known for the psychological thriller The Navigator (2015) and the Australian drama The System (2018). Both films were distributed by SGL for US and Canada release. His feature film Risen (2021) is a science fiction thriller based on the Chelabynsk meteorite explosion in Russia. Risen is distributed by Vertical Entertainment and was released in 2021. Arya's next movie is titled "Nikpa". Nikpa is a biopic movie based on the story of the Afghan Taekwondo champion Rohullah Nikpai who won the first ever Olympics medal for Afghanistan at the Beijing Olympics in 2008.
