= 1943–44 Australian bushfire season =

- Date: December 1943 – February 1944
- Location: Australia

Statistics
- Burned area: 1,000,000 ha (2,500,000 acres)

Impacts
- Deaths: 51
- Injuries: 700
- Structures lost: 650

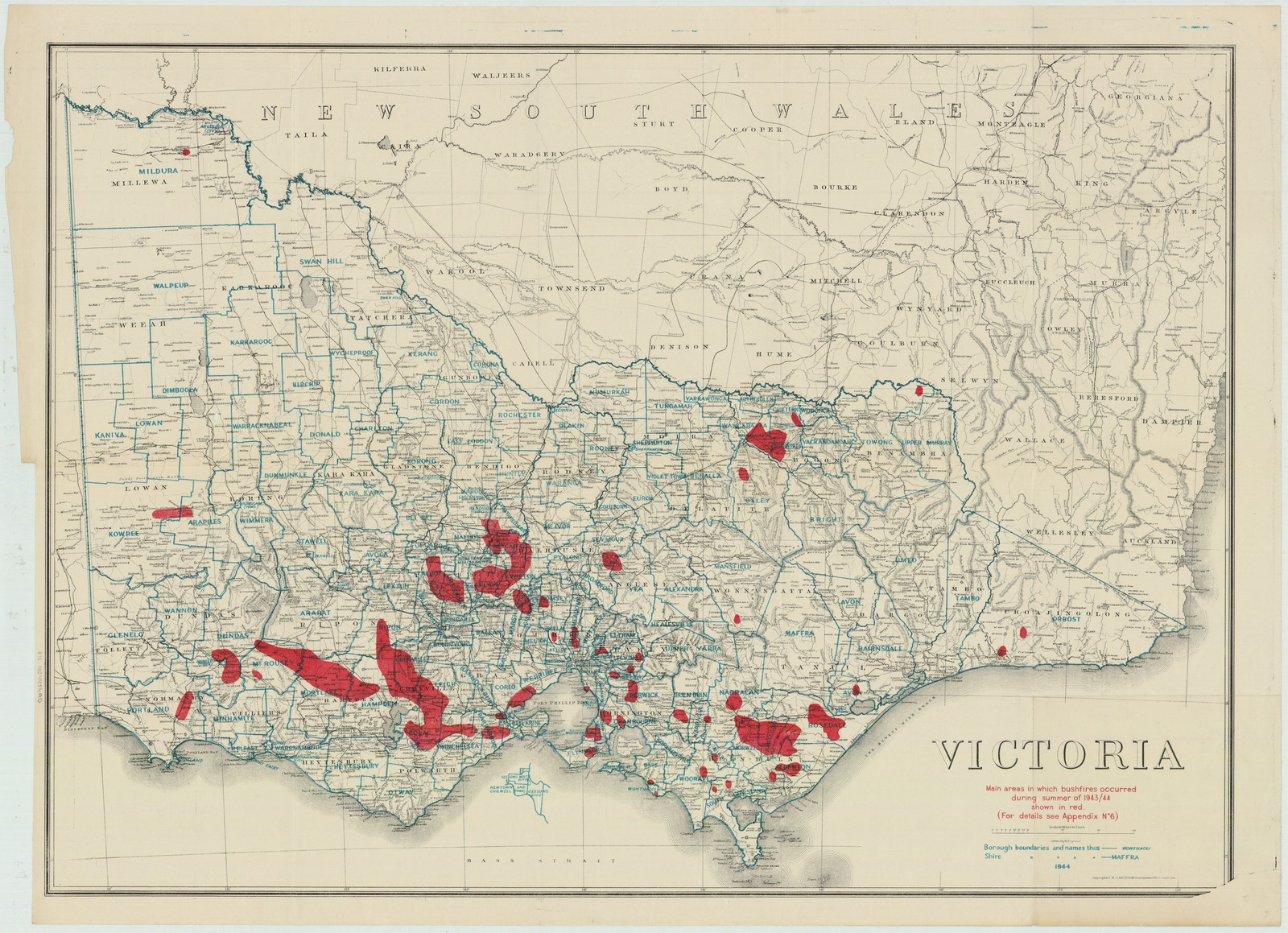
1943–44 Victorian bushfire season map

A series of major bushfires following severe drought conditions in the state of Victoria in Australia, occurred during the summer of 1943–44. It was the driest summer ever recorded in Melbourne until 2002 with just 46 millimetres or 1.81 inches falling, a third of the long-term average. Between 22 December 1943 and 15 February 1944, burnt an estimated one million ha, 51 people were killed, 700 injured, and 650 buildings were destroyed across the state. Many personnel who would have been normally available for fire fighting duties had been posted overseas and to remote areas of Australia during World War II.

== Timeline ==
=== December–January ===
The first major fire was a grassfire at Wangarrata on 22 December which burnt hundreds of hectares and resulted in 10 deaths. On 14 January and the following day, fires broke out across the state. To the west of Melbourne, a series of bushfires broke out between South Australian border and the outskirts of Geelong including areas near the towns of Hamilton, Skipton, Dunkeld, Birregurra and Goroke. Many smaller towns were substantially damaged. In Derrinallum, the only buildings left standing were the Mechanics' Institute, two churches and several business premises. In central Victoria, fires occurred near Daylesford, Woodend, Gisborne and Bendigo. In the Melbourne area, 63 homes were destroyed at Beaumaris and another 5 in the Glenroy – Pascoe Vale area.

On 14 February a fire broke out near Yallourn. In Hernes Oak, 16 houses and the post office were destroyed while 80 houses were destroyed and 6 lives lost in the Morwell district and 40 houses destroyed and 3 deaths occurred in the Traralgon area.

A major outcome following the fires was a Royal Commission led by Judge Leonard Stretton and the establishment of the Country Fire Authority in 1945 to co-ordinate rural fire brigades.
