= Paramita Roy =

Australian independent film director

Paramita Roy (Bangla: পারমিতা মুখার্জি রায়) is an Australian independent film director, producer, writer, educator and keen photographer. Born in Kolkata, India to Indian parents, Roy has relocated her family to Australia in 1999. She is best known for her work on feature films Hori Alone in Kolkata and Another Day in Paradise as director, producer and writer.

== Early life and education ==
Roy was born as Paramita Mukerjee, the daughter of late Ranada Prasad Mukerjee and Gita Mukerjee (Acharya), a businessman and a housewife respectively. Roy's early education took place in Kolkata, India, where she earned a Bachelor of Arts degree from Calcutta University. She left India when she was 23, and went to Riyadh, Saudi Arabia, where she lived for five years, before moving to Papua New Guinea in 1993. She later studied at the Queensland University of Technology for a bachelor's and master's degree in education. Recently, Roy has completed a Theatre Directing course at the National Institute of Dramatic Art (NIDA), and postgraduate studies in Film Directing at the Australian Film Television and Radio School (AFTRS) in Sydney, Australia.

== Career ==
Roy started her career as a school teacher and has taught in Canada, Papua New Guinea, Saudi Arabia and Australia. Currently, she teaches ICT at St Dominic's Priory College Adelaide, Australia.

In 2002, she initiated the Northern Territory Film-makers Association (NTFA) in Darwin, Australia, along with the Down Under International Film Festival as a founding member and secretary until she moved to Canberra in 2004. While in Darwin, she directed many short films including People of the Rock, Tell Me Why and Reaching to Me. In an international collaboration, Roy directed a feature film on child labour, which was mentioned at the Australian Capital Territory Legislative Assembly by Karin MacDonald. The film, titled Hori Alone in Kolkata, was screened in Australia and India. Roy has received several accolades for her photography, including the Life's Reflection Photography Award presented by the Chief Minister Jon Stanhope. In 2008–2009, Roy directed the feature film Another Day in Paradise, which was about three teachers from Australia, Romania and India and their journey. The film premiered in Australia in February 2010. Between 2005 and 2008, Roy had many of her articles published and presented at the national conference held by the Australian Council for Computers in Education. During her studies at NIDA, she directed a reflective piece about Indian students in Australia, called Paradise Lost. This was followed by another documentary and short film in 2010, Portrait of an Unknown Cabbie and The Leper, which were screened in Sydney, Australia.

== Filmography ==
Short Films

- Reaching to Me (2002). Subject: Domestic Violence
- Tell Me Why? (2002). Subject: Children in detention centre
- Our Planet, Our Future (2003). Subject: Pollution (environment)
- People of the Rock (2004). Subject: Prejudice
- God Tag (Producer) 2004. Subject: Indigenous Australians
- Paradise Lost (2010). Subject: Story of an Indian sStudent in Australia
- The Leper (2010). Subject: Outcast
- Portrait of an Unknown Cabbie (2010). Documentary about an ethnic taxi driver in Australia
- Hori Alone in Kolkata (2006)
- Another Day in Paradise (2010)
