= Luke Bakhuizen =

Australian photographer and filmmaker

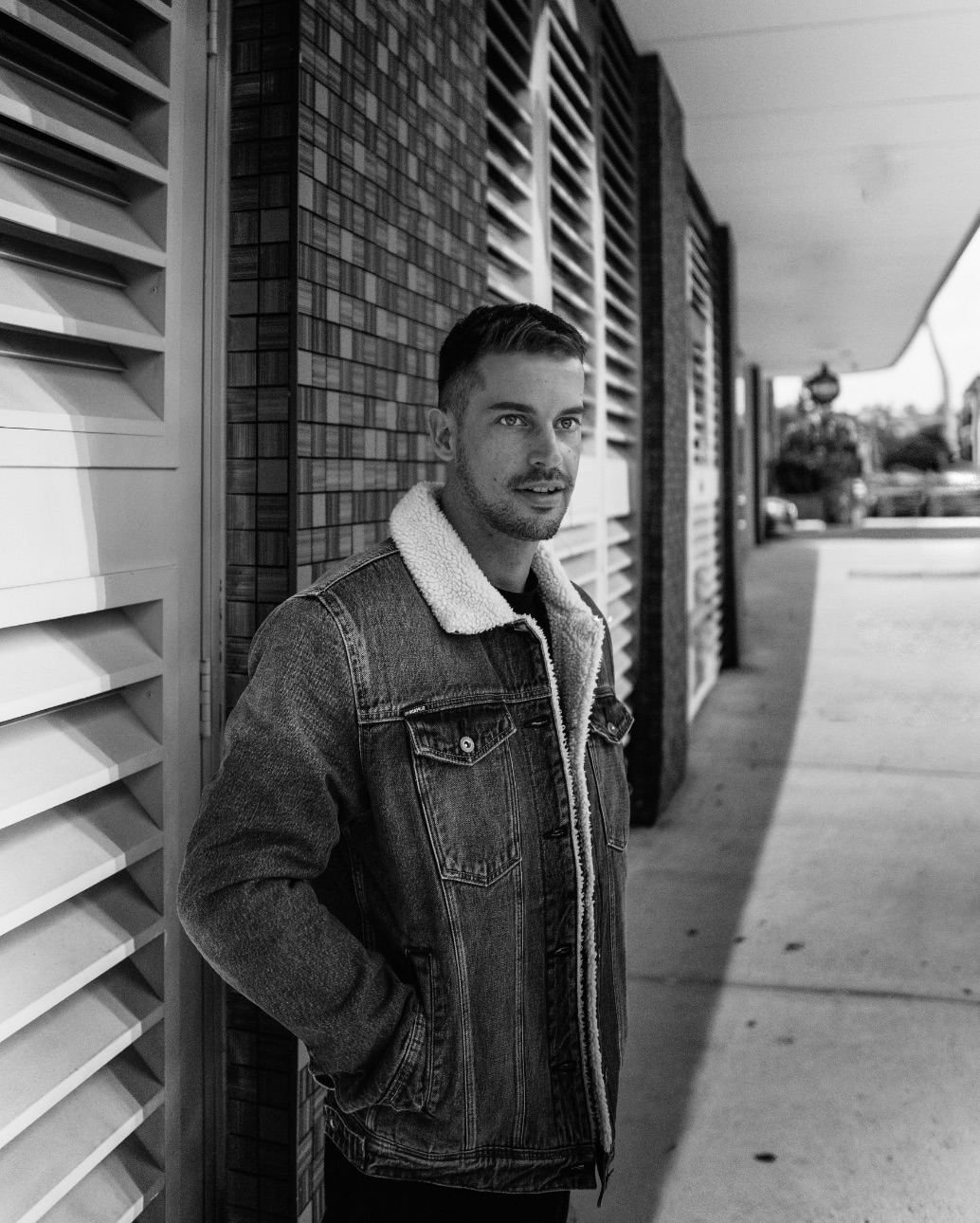
- Born: 7 January 1993 (age 33); South Africa
- Notable work: Collaboration with Tourism Australia, Sony, Corona (beer), DJI (company), SodaStream, STA Travel, Superdry, Subaru
- Style: Aerial photography

Luke Bakhuizen is an Australian photographer and filmmaker. He is known for the aerial shots in his photography and short videos on social media.

== Early life ==
Born on 7 January 1993, Luke grew up in South Africa and later moved to New Zealand where he qualified as a commercial pilot at the age of 21.

== Career ==
His passion for photography started as a hobby posting short video clips on social media. As his following grew, he started working for corporate clients and has collaborated with Tourism Australia in 2017 to showcase the country as a destination using a combination of drone and digital photography. In 2018, Sony partnered with Luke to create promotional 4K action camera videos. Luke worked on a world first joint collaboration in 2018 with Subaru, Superdry and STA Travel to promote automotive, travel and fashion industries in a single collaboration Luke has worked with Corona (beer) and SodaStream to raise awareness about the plastic epidemic in Australia. In 2019 DJI partnered with Luke to promote drones and action cameras. His photography is viewed as unique due to the combination of various aerial views captured via drone, paraglider and fixed-wing aircraft.
