= Luke Anthony =

Australian born actor, writer, director and production designer

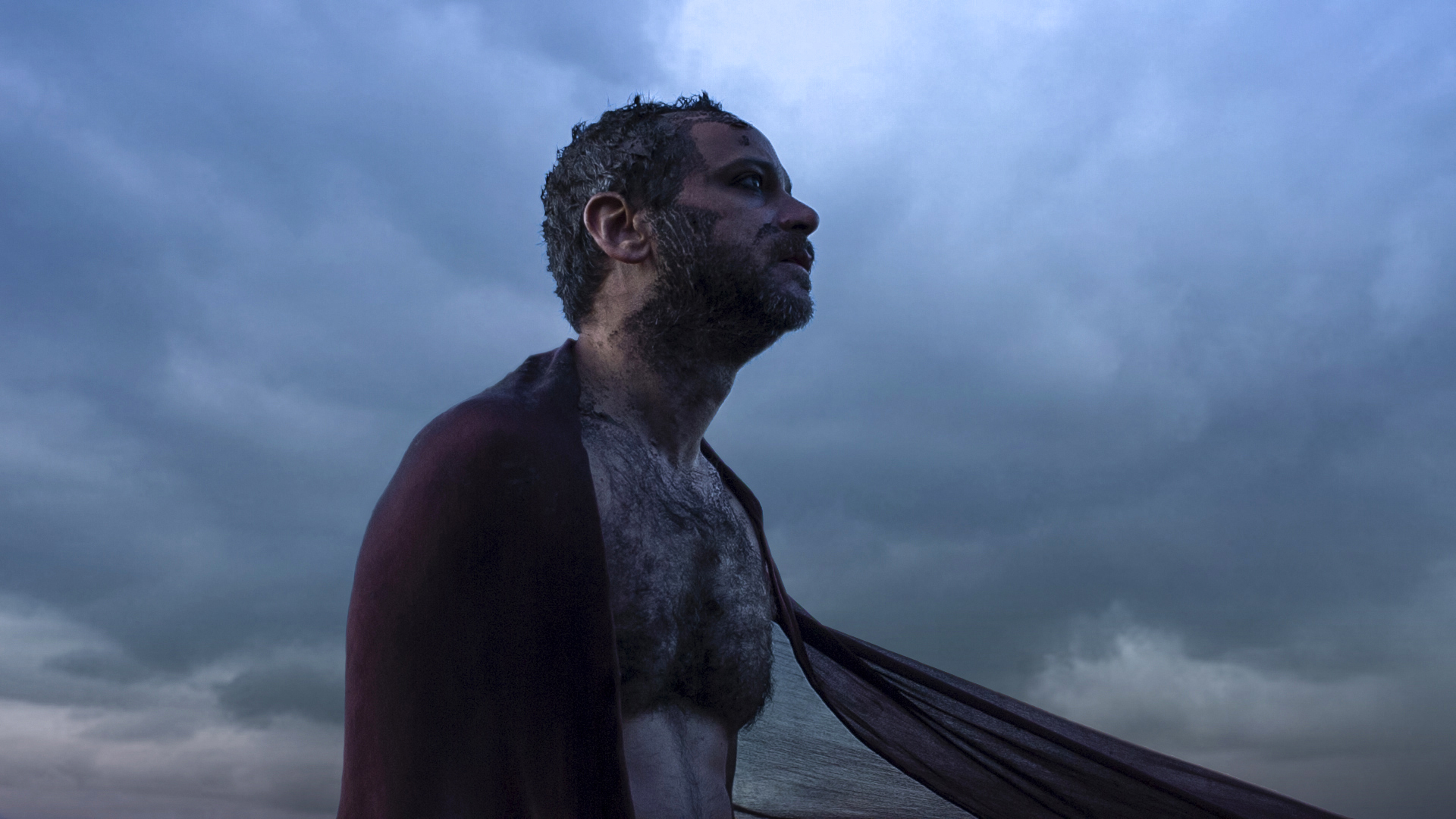
- American Alternate test shoot, San Francisco (2019)
- Born: Luke Edward Anthony; Sydney, Australia
- Occupations: Actor, Writer, Director
- Years active: 1996–present

Luke Edward Anthony (born 5 December 1976) is an Australian actor, director and screenwriter. He is a two-time finalist of the Sundance Institute screenwriting labs and a recipient of the New South Wales Film and Television Office Emerging Filmmaker's Fund. Anthony is also notable for receiving the SBS Audience Choice Award at Flickerfest for his short film, White Bread, which was mentored by Neil Armfield. His stage work includes Aristophane's Birds at the iconic Sydney Opera House. He is also an accomplished set decorator, working predominantly on Masterchef Australia.

== Early life ==
Anthony was born on 5 December 1976, in Sydney, Australia. He was raised in Cairns, Far North Queensland, where his parents ran a family restaurant in the town. His mother, Christine Sandra Anthony, employed the first Aboriginal flight attendant for Qantas and later worked with indigenous communities in Cape York. Anthony's father, Donald Anthony, is the son of Greek-Cypriot parents who immigrated to Australia. Luke is the middle child of three brothers, Nathan Donald Anthony and Matthew John Anthony.

== Career ==
Anthony studied acting in Brisbane at Queensland University of Technology where he earned his B.A. Drama before moving to Sydney, after which time he found small parts performing on the stage and in TV dramas. With his acting career in limbo, Anthony moved to London where he worked with students at Mike Leigh's London Film School. and became interested in a job behind the camera as a writer/director. Upon returning to Australia he was awarded several government filmmaker initiatives and made two short films, one of which was later sold to television. Due to the strong design aspect of his work, Anthony was soon offered set decorator work at Fremantle Australia and Endemol Shine.

In 2016 Anthony moved to San Francisco to pursue his writer/director ambition and has developed projects for the American market with Greek producer Mando Stathi. His debut feature screenplay, American Alternate, advanced to the final round of the Sundance Institute screenwriting labs in 2017 and 2018.
