= Andrew Thatcher =

Australian actor and film director

- Born: Andrew Thatcher
- Occupation: Actor/Director/Writer
- Years active: 1984–present

Andrew Thatcher is an Australian born actor and film director. His directing highlights include the action films Urban Lockdown and Charity Hurts.

== Biography ==
Andrew Thatcher is an Australian independent creator of films and video games. Outside of film making and acting Andrew has a passion for photography and has had his works published on numerous occasions. He also is an avid martial artist and performs as a Pro wrestler 'Bushido' on the Australian independent wrestling circuit.

While his favorite genre is action, his works also have elements of comedy as he embraces B movie, low budget aesthetics.

He is most well known for his film and video games of Urban Lockdown and Bad ass babes.

== Selected filmography ==
2019: Bad ass babes writer, director, editor, action choreographer Actor: Johnny Doomsday

2015: Urban Lockdown writer, director, editor, fight choreographer Actor: Rick

2010: Charity hurts writer, director, editor, fight choreographer Actor: Jason Jones

2009: Two's company, thieves a crowd (feature) writer, director, editor, fight choreographer Actor: James
