= Peter Kirk (director) =

Indigenous Australian director, screenwriter and producer

Peter Kirk (born 1 July 1969), is an Indigenous Australian director, screenwriter, and producer.

== Biography ==
Kirk was born on 1 July 1969 and attended Ramadan College in Canberra before he started directing in 2000.

Kirk won Most Outstanding Directorial Debut at Houston International Film Festival. He was nominated as one of the top 25 creatives to watch by Sydney Morning Herald.

Kirk is CEO of Pluto Media, a content platform that combines stories, art, genres and behind the scenes artists discovery, with offices in Los Angeles, Manila, and Doha. He is also one of the founders and director of Hello Forever Pt Ltd.

== Filmography ==
=== Films ===
Title	Role	Format	Length
Denouement	Director/Writer	35mm	18 mins
Water's Edge	Director/Writer	RED	42 mins
One Night	Director/Writer	P2	38 mins
Skin Deep	Director/Writer	16mm	54 mins

=== Commercials/TVC ===
(15, 30 60 sec)

Brand	Role	Format	Territories
Lynx/Axe – Boom Chika Wah Wah	Director	35mm	AUS/NZ/PH
Smirnoff – Mule	Director	35mm	AUS/NZ/PH
Trend Micro – Rugby League	Director/Writer	5d	AUS/NZ
Windows Vista	Director/Writer	5d	AUS/NZ
Medal of Honour	Director/Writer	5d	AUS/NZ
Xbox – Alan Wake	Director/Producer	RED	AUS/NZ
RSPCA – My Best Friend	Director/Writer	RED	AUS/NZ
OMO – Dirt Is Good	Director	RED	AUS/NZ
Xbox – Red vs Blue	Director	RED	AUS
Windows 7	Director	RED	AUS
World Vision	Director/Producer	RED	AUS
Telstra	Director/Producer	RED	AUS
Google	Director/Producer	RED	AUS
Greenpeace	Director/Writer	RED	AUS

=== Music Videos and Video Clips ===
Band	Song title	Role	Format
Linkin Park	What I've Done (Australia Version)	Director/Producer	RED
Ricki Lee	Don't Miss You	Director/Producer	16mm
Ricki Lee	Crazy	Director/Producer	35mm
The Humm	Echo Beach	Director	RED
BlackStreet	Australian Tour	Director	RED
Nick Hardcastle	Everyday	Director/Producer	P2
Emyna	The Rock Queen	Director	5d
Nate Wade	Roller Coaster	Director/Producer	5d
Mirrah	Space	Director/Producer	16mm

=== Online Campaigns ===
Brand	Role	Format
Real Estate Australia	Director	5d
The Knowing	Director	5d
Football Australia	Director	5d
Cyberbullying	Director/Writer	RED
Linkin Park	Director	RED
Olay	Director	RED
AHM Insurance	Director	5d
Cancer Council	Director	RED
Lynx	Director	RED
Australian Tourism	Director	RED
Toyota	Director	RED
James Blunt	Director	5d
Qantas	Director	5d
Virgin Money	Director	P2

=== TV ===
Show Title	Role	Time Undertaking Role
Entertainment Weekly (Australia)	Series Director	2 years
Weather Channel	Staff Director	2 years
Channel V (Australia)	Series Producer	1 year

== Awards and recognition ==
Webby Award Winner (2007) – Best Content for Lynx/Abe

Webb Award Winner (2010) – People Choice Award for Google

AIMS Awards Winner (2010) – Green Peace

W Awards Winner – Alan Wake

IAMB Awards Winner – Google

I AB Awards Runner Up – Green Peace

Best Ad Campaign Winner – Australian Ad Awards for Xbox

Oz Music Awards Nominee (2010) Video Clip of the Year by Ricki Lee

Oz Music Awards Nominee (2010) for Video Clip of the Year by Mirrah

Australian Rising Star Award Nominee (2009) for Sun Herald Awards

Kirk, being the director of the short film Denouement, won the Best Drama Award and Best Soundtrack Award in the 2009 West Hollywood International Film Festival, International Film Achievement Award at the So Cal Film Festival in Huntington Beach, California (2009), and Aloha Accolade Award in Honolulu Film Awards (2010). Hello Forever won best debut feature film at World Fest in Houston in 2014.
