= Luke A. McKay =

Australian film director

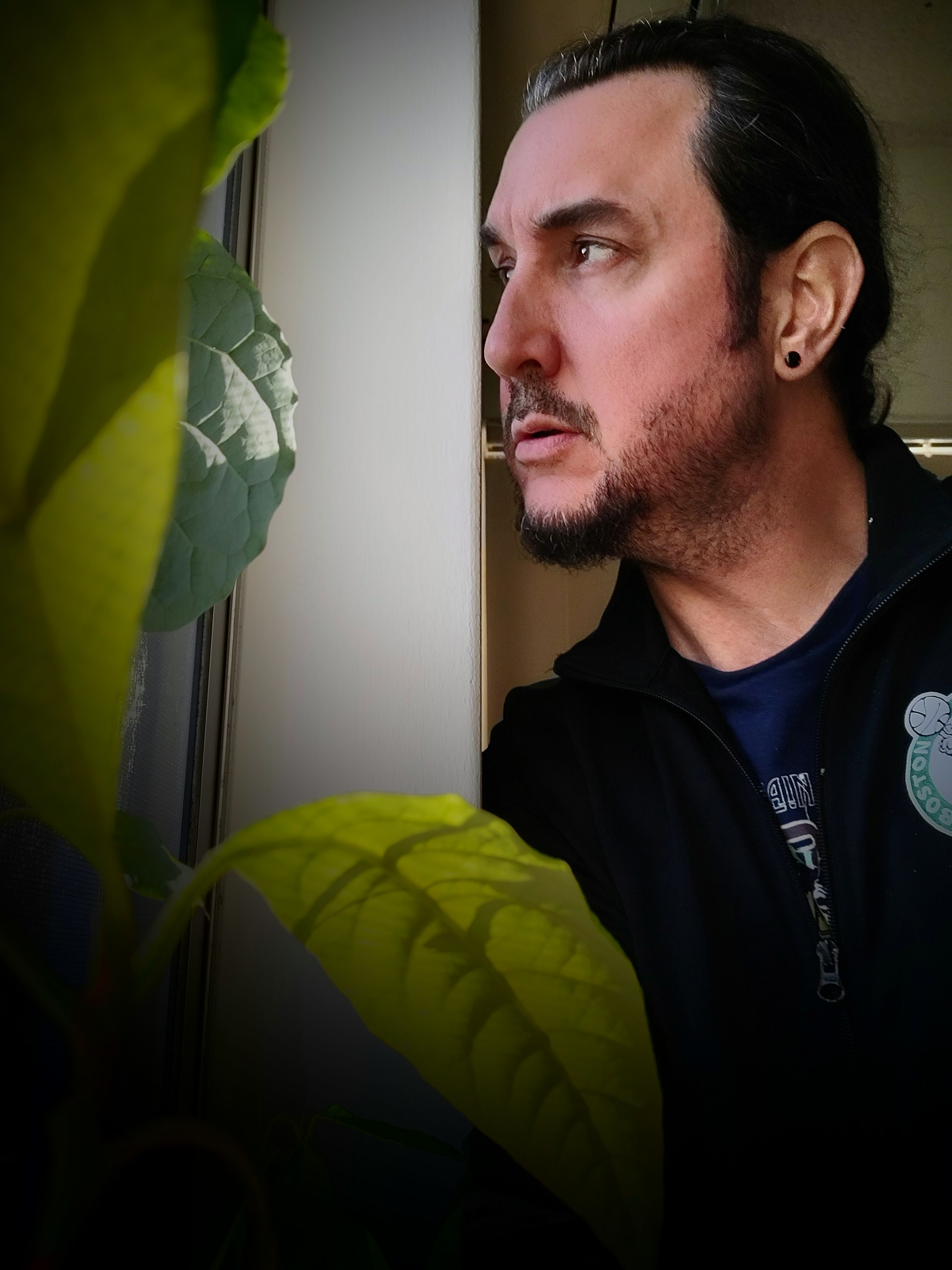
- Born: 17 July 1981 (age 44); Sydney
- Occupation(s): Film director, screenwriter

Luke A. McKay (born 17 July 1981) is an Australian film director and screenwriter. He was born in Blacktown, New South Wales, Australia and is of Maltese, Irish and Scottish descent.

== Filmography ==
=== Short films ===
| Year | Film |
|---|---|
| 2008 | The End |
| 2009 | You and I |
| 2011 | Hit and Run |
| 2015 | Colt 13 |
| 2021 | You're No Angel |

== Awards and nominations ==
- "Best International Film" at the 2016 South Dakota Film Festival for Colt 13.
- Platinum Remi Award for "Dramatic Original Short" at the 2016 WorldFest-Houston International Film Festival for Colt 13.
- "Best Picture" and "Best Director" at the 2012 New England Underground Film Festival (formerly New Haven Underground Film Festival) for Hit and Run.
- "Best Foreign Short" at the 2013 Bare Bones International Film Festival for Hit and Run.

=== Nominations ===
- "Best Short Narrative" at the 2021 Arizona Underground Film Festival for You're No Angel.
- "Best Short Film" at the 2016 Boston Film Festival for Colt 13.
- "Golden Knight" Award at the 2016 Golden Knight Malta International Film Festival for Colt 13.
- "Best Director - Short Film" at the 2015 Sydney Indie Film Festival for Colt 13.
- "Best Director" at the 2017 Red Dirt International Film Festival for Colt 13.
- "Best Short Short" at the 2012 Action On Film International Film Festival for Hit and Run.
- "Best Short Narrative" at the 2012 Denver Underground Film Festival for Hit and Run.
- "Best Action Sequence in a Short Film" at the 2011 Action On Film International Film Festival for The End.

Other works include online fashion content/TVC's for David Jones, featuring Victoria's Secret supermodel Miranda Kerr and for JLH, featuring former Miss Universe, Jennifer Hawkins.
