= Karen Pearlman =

American film director

Karen Pearlman is a film scholar, known for her pioneering work in articulating underlying principles concerning what rhythm in film is and the purpose it serves in modulating cycles of tension and release for viewers. Currently Associate Professor in Screen Production and Practice at Macquarie University, she is the author of Cutting Rhythms, Shaping the Film Edit (Focal Press, 2009) and its second edition Cutting Rhythms, Intuitive Film Editing (Focal Press, 2016).

The focus of Pearlman's research, first developed when Head of Screen Studies at the Australian Film, Television and Radio School, is on the connection of film theory and practice by making conceptual thinking accessible and useful to practitioners. She co-directs The Physical TV Company with Richard James Allen. In 2009 Dr Pearlman was elected President of The Australian Screen Editors Guild (ASE).

== Background influences ==
Many of Pearlman's ideas about rhythm, editing, and affect derive from her career as a professional dancer with the Bill T. Jones/Arnie Zane Dance Company; dancing and choreographing in the theaters, lofts and experimental dance venues of Australia, the US and in Europe. As well as using her understanding of kinesthetic empathy in her theorizing, she applies her choreographic sensibility to her own editing and dramaturgy.

== Books ==
- Pearlman, Karen (2016). Cutting Rhythms: Intuitive Film Editing. New York; London: Focal Press, an imprint of Taylor & Francis Group. pp. xxix, 264 p. : ill., 24 cm. ISBN 978-1-138-94608-8. (hbk. : alk. paper) ISBN 978-1-138-85651-6 (pbk. : alk. paper).
- Pearlman, Karen (2009). Cutting Rhythms: Shaping the Film Edit. Amsterdam; Boston: Focal Press/Elsevier. pp. xxix, 269 p. : ill., 24 cm. ISBN 978-0-240-81014-0. (hbk. : alk. paper) ISBN 0-240-81014-7 (pbk. : alk. paper).
- Allen, Richard James; Karen Pearlman (1999). Performing the Unnameable: An Anthology of Australian Performance Texts. Sydney, N.S.W., Australia: Currency Press in association with RealTime. pp. xv, 203 p. : ill., 28 cm. ISBN 0-86819-420-4.
- Allen, Richard James; Karen Pearlman (1996). New Life on the 2nd Floor. Launceston, TAS, Australia: Tasdance. pp. 76 p. : ill., 22 cm. ISBN 0-9586795-0-9.
