= Richard James Allen =

Australian poet (born 1960)

- Born: 1960 (age 65–66); Kempsey, New South Wales, Australia
- Occupations: Poet, dancer, actor and filmmaker

Richard James Allen (born 1960) is a contemporary Australian poet, dancer, actor and filmmaker. The former artistic director of the Poets Union Inc, and founding director of the Australian Poetry Festival, Allen was co-artistic director with Karen Pearlman of That Was Fast (New York City) and Tasdance (Launceston), and now at The Physical TV Company (Sydney).

Allen has published thirteen books of poetry, fiction or performance texts, most recently Text Messages from the Universe (2023), More Lies (2021), The short story of you and I (2019), Fixing the Broken Nightingale (2014), The Kamikaze Mind (2006), and Performing the Unnameable: An Anthology of Australian Performance Texts (1999), co-edited with Karen Pearlman. He received the 2005 University of Technology, Sydney, Chancellor's Award for Best Doctoral Thesis. A multi-award-winning film adaptation of his Kenneth Slessor Prize for Poetry-nominated book, Thursday's Fictions (1999), was first broadcast by the Australian Broadcasting Corporation in 2007. This surreal dance fantasy also has a Second Life presence, Thursday's Fictions in Second Life.

He is the grandson of World War II Major General Arthur Samuel "Tubby" Allen, son of novelist and short story writer Robert Allen, and the brother of art critic Christopher Allen.

== Books ==
- Allen, Richard James (c. 2023). Text Messages from the Universe. ASM: Macau & Cerberus Press: Markwell, N.S.W., Australia: Flying Island Books. ISBN 978-0-6455503-1-3.
- — (c. 2021). More Lies. Brisbane, Queensland, Australia: Interactive Press. ISBN 978-19223-32-64-6.
- — (c. 2019). The short story of you and I. Perth, Western Australia, Australia: UWA Publishing. ISBN 978-17608-00-21-5.
- — (c. 2014). Fixing the broken nightingale. ASM: Macau & Cerberus Press: Markwell, N.S.W., Australia: Flying Island Books. ISBN 978-99965-42-58-9.
- — (c. 2006). The kamikaze mind. Blackheath, N.S.W., Australia: Brandl & Schlesinger. ISBN 1-876040-71-8.
- — (c. 1999). Thursday's fictions. Wollongong, N.S.W., Australia: Five Islands Press. ISBN 0-86418-596-0.
- with Karen Pearlman (c. 1999). Performing the Unnameable: An Anthology of Australian Performance Texts. Sydney, N.S.W., Australia: Currency Press in association with RealTime. ISBN 0-86819-420-4.
- with Karen Pearlman (c. 1996). New Life on the 2nd Floor. Launceston, TAS, Australia: Tasdance. ISBN 0-9586795-0-9.
- — (c. 1995). The air dolphin brigade. Brooklyn, N.S.W., Australia, and Launceston, TAS, Australia: Paper Bark Press in association with Tasdance. ISBN 0-646-26678-0.
- — (c. 1995). What to name your baby. Brooklyn, N.S.W., Australia, and Launceston, TAS, Australia: Paper Bark Press in association with Tasdance. ISBN 0-646-23747-0.
- — (c. 1993). Hope for a man named Jimmie; &, Grand illusion Joe. Wollongong, N.S.W., Australia: Five Islands Press Associates. ISBN 1-875604-07-3.
- — (c. 1989). To the ocean; &, Scheherazade. Sydney, N.S.W., Australia: Hale & Iremonger. ISBN 0-86806-396-7.
- — (c. 1986). The way out at last & other poems. Sydney, N.S.W., Australia: Hale & Iremonger. ISBN 0-86806-248-0.
