= Lucien Savron =

Australian theatre and film director

Lucien Savron was an Australian theatre and film director noted for his imaginative productions.

== Life and career ==
Lucien Oliver Brillat Savron was born in East Melbourne on 5 July 1967 to Gillian Edna Smith and Bruno Savron. Upon finishing University High School, he worked as a production assistant and runner for the commercial production house Macrae & Way before attending the University of Melbourne and completing a Bachelor of Arts (Honours) in Pure Philosophy at Trinity College.

Whilst a student, he gained attention with his newly formed GAS Theatre Company, staging dynamic productions including the critically acclaimed Othello starring Tristan Gemmill. He was awarded the Sutherland Award for Theatrical Achievement and a Queen Elizabeth II Silver Jubilee Award Grant for Young Australians in 1992 to stage the Handel opera Alceste. He also appeared onstage as Lord Stanley in Mark Nicholls' production of Richard III in 1989 at the Guild Theatre. In 1992, he worked as an assistant director at the Melbourne Theatre Company and was later accepted into the directing course at the prestigious National Institute of Dramatic Art, graduating in 1996. In 1995, Savron directed the playreading of Patrick White's "The Ham Funeral" at Budinski's, Melbourne.

Throughout his time at NIDA, he was active in the professional scene, directing acclaimed productions for Perth's Black Swan State Theatre Company, and productions of Woyzeck at the CUB Ale Store in Melbourne, Lucky at the Carlton Courthouse, and Alex Broun's Desire for the Melbourne Fringe Festival, both starring Radha Mitchell. He was also the Coordinator of the Universal Theatre. Following his stint at NIDA, he worked again as assistant director on the Australian feature film Blackrock based on Nick Enright's play. With an appreciation for not only theatre but film, Savron was a prolific screenwriter, and after several treatments for potential feature films, in 1998, he was awarded the "emerging writer's mentorship" at Tropfest at Fox Studios in Sydney.

Two years later, he began his transition to cinema in earnest, setting up his production company, Twenty Dollar Films, writing and directing six short films (Anyone for Coffee?, Dieu Est Mort, $20, Chasen, What Happened Last Night?). The same year, he was given a "New Writer's Grant" from Film Victoria for his script Still Holding, based around the infamous Pettingill family. The script won him the Best Unproduced Screenplay title at the Inside Film Awards, which led to meetings with various Hollywood agents and producers.

Further acclaim came in Melbourne when he teamed with actor/writer John-Paul Hussey, (a longtime Savron collaborator), for the one-man play Chocolate Monkey in 2002, which garnered two Green Room Award nominations, many return seasons, rave reviews, a national tour and featured in the Dublin Fringe Festival. He later followed this success with Love Monkey in 2009 also written by and featuring Hussey, with whom Savron collaborated repeatedly on further productions.

In 2005 he created the Bondi International Theatre Company producing and acoustic rock musical The Merchant of Venice Beach based on the play by William Shakespeare. The play was later turned into a "rockumentry" by Film Company K11 based in Milan.

He revisited Still Holding, adapting the screenplay for the stage, the production played at the La Mama Courthouse in 2008. Later that year he was invited by Fly-On-The-Wall Theatre's Artistic Director Robert Chuter (director) to direct a series of new playreadings at ACPA, North Melbourne. These readings were the prelude to the acclaimed ten-minute play festival MelBorn08's Playspotting at the La Mama Courthouse, for which Savron directed both Cate Blanchett Wants to be my Friend on Facebook by Alex Broun and Unsafe Sex, a short film, broken into chapters, that played during the interim between plays. At the same time, Love Monkey received a work-in-progress showing as part of the Melbourne Arts Centre's TILT program and was granted development funding from Arts Victoria. It was also awarded Best Music Composition at the 2008 Green Room Awards. The end of 2008 saw Savron collaborate with David Walters on the low-budget feature film Nirvana Beach Liquor.

After the film wrapped, Savron accepted a lectureship in the Cinema Television Programme at the United International College, a combined initiative of Hong Kong Baptist University and Beijing Normal University. He returned to Melbourne in 2010 where he reunited with Chuter to direct the Australian premiere rehearsed playreading of Sam Shore's The Idea of America, at Chapel Off Chapel as part of the 4PLAY Chapel Midsumma Readings. He then worked again with Hussey on a 50-minute stand-up comedy piece called 3 Magic Moves for the Melbourne Comedy Festival before he recommenced working with Walters developing adaptations of two Neil Cole works Colonel Surry's Insanity and beginning work on The Campaign.

== Death ==
Savron was killed in a car accident on 4 May 2011 in Millbrook, Victoria. At the time of his death, he was planning another screenplay (Three Days in Wan Chai – still in treatment form) with Walters and was planning to stage a new production of the four-act version of The Importance of Being Earnest with Chuter.

== List of Productions and Films ==
- The Way I Was (1996)
- Low Level Panic (1996)
- The Ghost Sonata (1989)
- Endgame (1990)
- Notes from Underground (1990)
- Marat/Sade (1991)
- Titus Andronicus (1991)
- Twice Born (1991)
- Toss Pots (1990–1)
- Alceste (1992)

Judas Iscariot (1992)

- Othello (1990)
- Waiting for Godot (1993)

Lola Lightwheel (1993)

- Woyzeck (1994)
- Family Running for Mr. Whippy (1995)
- Slam Dunk (1995)
- Lucky (1995)

Lucky (re-mount 1996)

- Desire (1995)
- Diary of a Madman (1997)
- Anyone for Coffee? (2000)-short film
- Dieu Est Mort (2000) -short film
- $20 (2000)-short film
- Chasen (2000)-short film
- Chocolate Monkey (2002–3)
- What Happened Last Night (2004)-short film
- The Merchant of Venice Beach (2005)
- The Zoo Story (2007)
- Still Holding (2008)
- Love Monkey (2008)
- The Music of Orpheus (2008)-playreading
- Sushi Wushi Woo (2008) -playreading
- The Empty Vessel (2008)-playreading
- Ten Years (2008)- playreading
- Crossed Lines (2008)- playreading
- Cate Blanchett Wants to be my Friend on Facebook (2008)
- Unsafe Sex (2008) -short film
- Nirvana Beach Liquor (2008-ongoing)-Feature film
- The Idea of America (2011)-playreading
- 3 Magic Moves (2011)

== Awards and nominations ==
- IF Awards: Best Unproduced Screenplay
