= Nobelius railway station =

Railway station in Victoria, Australia

Nobelius
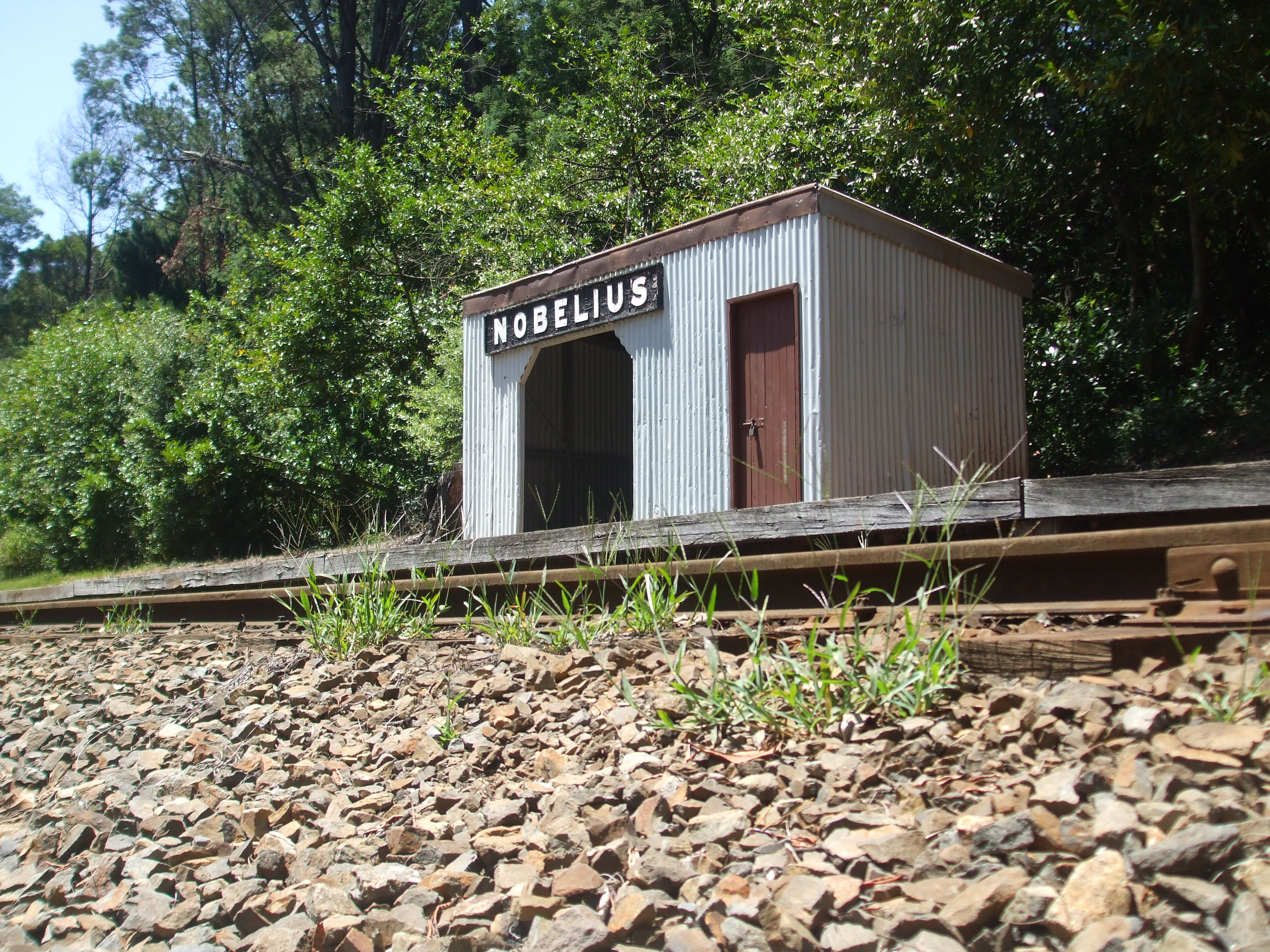
- Nobelius station and platform, January 2008.

General information
- Location: Emerald VIC 3782; Australia
- Coordinates: 37°56′04″S 145°27′19″E
- Elevation: 261 m (856 ft)
- System: Puffing Billy Railway station
- Lines: Puffing Billy Railway; Gembrook railway line (former)
- Distance: 53.43 km (33.20 mi) from Flinders Street
- Platforms: 1
- Tracks: 1

Other information
- Status: Unstaffed

History
- Opened: 7 March 1927; 99 years ago

Services
Preceding station	Puffing Billy Railway	Following station
Nobelius Siding towards Belgrave	Gembrook line	Lakeside towards Gembrook
Former services
Preceding station	VicRail	Following station
Nobelius Siding towards Upper Ferntree Gully	Gembrook line	Lakeside towards Gembrook
Location

Nobelius railway station is a narrow-gauge tourist heritage railway station operated by the Puffing Billy Railway in Victoria, Australia. Located in Emerald to the southeast of the township, it officially opened on 28 March 1927 as a wayside station on the Gembrook line. It was named after the founder of the nearby Gembrook Nurseries, Carl Axel Nobelius, and his family. After the line's closure in April 1954, Nobelius station remained closed until the Puffing Billy service was extended to Lakeside station on 18 October 1975. Trains do not usually stop at Nobelius except by prior arrangement, such as on a chartered train.

== Description ==
Nobelius station is located to the southeast of Emerald, a town on the periurban fringe of Greater Melbourne, Australia. It is away from the town centre, accessible via the residential Station Avenue and on the southern edge of the Emerald Lake Precinct. The station is one of few in Victoria not belonging to VicTrack; instead, it is owned and operated by the Puffing Billy Railway Board, and is serviced by heritage steam locomotives on the Puffing Billy Railway. Located 53.43 km (33.20 mi) from Flinders Street Station and 11.40 km (7.09 mi) from the start of its line in Belgrave, it lies between the Nobelius Siding (up-line towards Belgrave) and Lakeside station (down-line towards Gembrook).

Nobelius Station outside the shelter shed, Nov 2026

The station consists of a single 47 m (153 ft) side platform with a grass surface and wooden edge. This only contemporary station building is a Victorian Railways "Corrugated Iron Shelter Shed and Store," also known as a Mallee shed; it includes a covered seat protected from wind and rain, and a small lockable office or storage room. On the platform to the right of the shelter is a park bench and memorial to the late Danny Rhodes.

Memorial to Danny Rhodes at Nobelius Station, Nov 2026

Nobelius station is highly inaccessible relative to many other stations on the line; reaching it requires navigating a dirt track interrupted by fallen logs from Railway Avenue, where there is no formal parking area—only informal street parking—and where the nearest public transport connection is approximately 400 m (1300 ft) away. The Nobelius Track in the Emerald Lake Precinct also passes Nobelius Station, but only on the other side of the tracks.

== History ==
Following the death of prominent nurseryman Carl Axel Nobelius in 1921, his vast Gembrook Nurseries property was subdivided and sold to two syndicates. The syndicate owning the property including the future site of Nobelius station was called the Nobelius Estate Syndicate, but would later become known as Nobelius Station Estates. This syndicate, led by then-Councillor W. H. Treganowan, in 1925 began to arrange for the construction of a railway station on their land. By entirely self-funding the station, the syndicate was able to secure it within two years, officially opening on 28 March, 1927.

The Gembrook line in that year lost ₤16,169, limiting Victorian Railways' willingness to open new stations, but their officials expressed gratitude to the community and syndicate for organising the funding. The syndicate aimed to draw demand through the development of the area around the new station, with contemporary plans to construct a lake (Lake Treganowan), bowling green, and tennis court in the area. W. H. Treganowan also expressed optimistic hopes that the narrow-gauge Gembrook line would be converted to the 1600mm (5 ft 3 in) broad gauge used on Melbourne's suburban lines, which would entice more to move to the Emerald district.

Nobelius station c. the late 1920s, soon after opening; a more substantial structure is present beside an older Mallee shed.

Photographs from the station's early history indicate the presence of a more substantial structure than there is at the present station. By 1942, these included a general waiting room, a ladies waiting room, an open shelter, and toilets. The other distinctive difference in the appearance of the original Nobelius station is the lack of trees; where today's station is surrounded by reforested parkland, in the late 1920s the land was still cleared after its time as part of the nursery.

In 1929, the syndicate subdivided much of their land into blocks ranging from quarter-acres (approx. 0.1 ha) to one-acre blocks (approx. 0.4 ha), with the smaller blocks mostly adjoining Nobelius station. By 1930, a lake had been established, though not to the scale the syndicate had hoped; this was sufficient for the newly established Emerald Swimming Club, but the present Lake Treganowan did not open until 1940 after residents sought governmental assistance. In 1935, Victorian Railways decided to close the unprofitable Gembrook line on 13 January 1936, to the fierce opposition of residents, businesses, and local councils in the region. In C. T. Alexander's argument against the closure, the residents' full funding of Nobelius station was cited as a reason the decision was unfair to the community and unreasonable. The Victorian Minister for Transport, Albert Bussau, agreed to visit the region and re-adjudicate the decision; ultimately, the Gembrook line was saved.

In 1938, the Fern Tree Gully Shire Council agreed to purchase 114 acres (approx. 46 ha) of former nursery land, including Nobelius station, from the Nobelius Station Estates. This decision was in part made following pressure from the Emerald Progress Association and thanks to an offered ₤1000 development grant from the state government. They expressed intentions to develop the surrounding area as a "caravan, motor camp, and picnic park," and by 1940 had successfully opened Lake Treganowan.

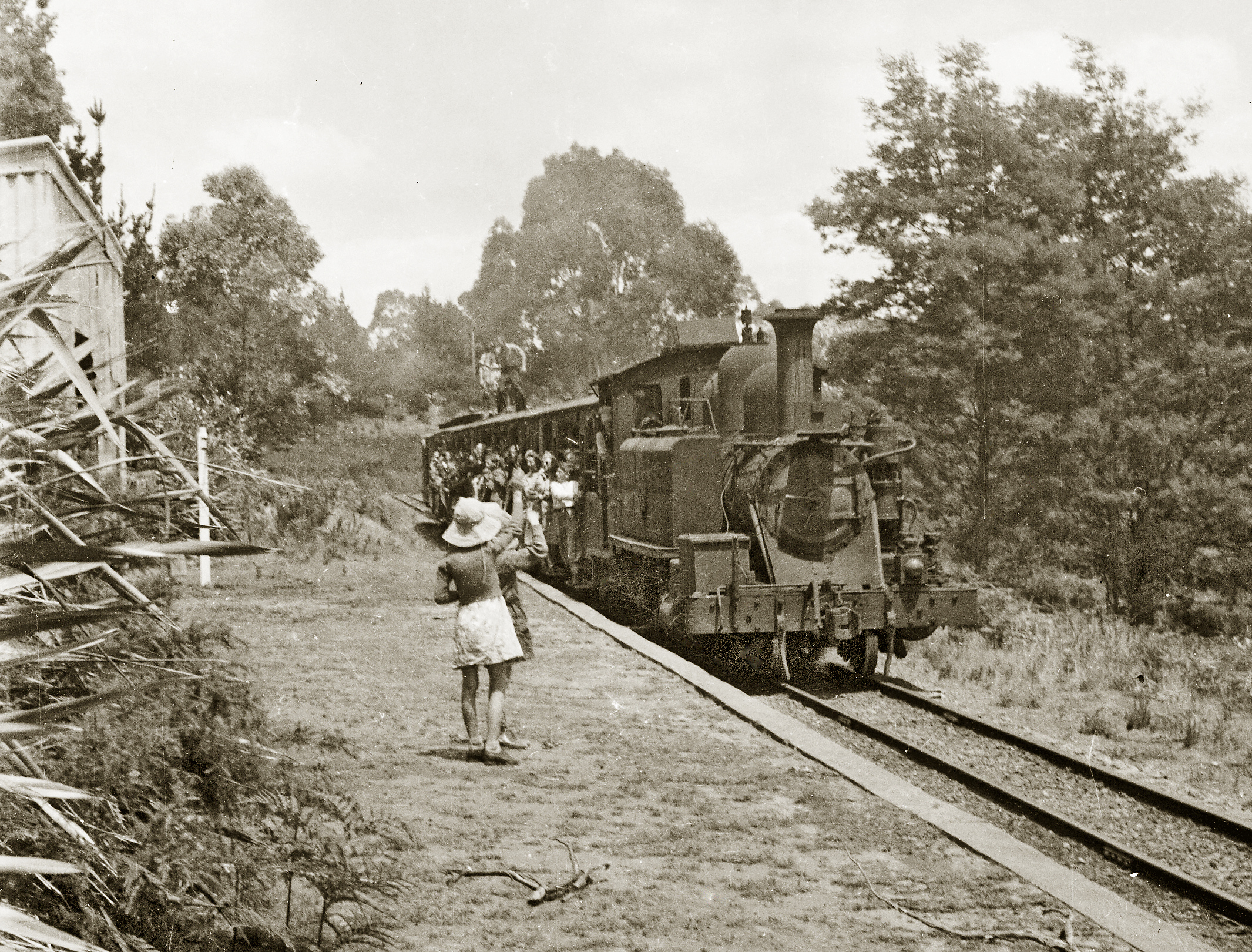
Nobelius station c. 1944; by this point the larger structure has been removed and the forest is regrowing.

In 1942, the station building was removed and replaced with a corrugated iron Mallee shed, resembling Nobelius' present layout. Though available photographs are from an obscuring angle, the modern shelter design with an office room appears to be in place, while the forest around the station was in the process of regrowing. Notably, the station nameplate was missing; this may be a consequence of Second World War counter-espionage efforts. This was also the year in which Lakeside station opened down the line by Lake Treganowan, usurping Nobelius as the closest stop to the increasingly popular Emerald Lake Park.

In April 1954, the Gembrook line officially closed following a landslide between Selby and Menzies Creek in 1953; after years of escalating losses, Victorian Railways resolved that it would be better to close the line than clear the landslide to reopen it. For two decades Nobelius station remained unused, with photographs from 1971 showing the building unmaintained and the area overgrown. On 18 October 1975, Nobelius reopened, restored, as part of the Puffing Billy Railway when it extended from Emerald station to terminate at Lakeside. In 1977, ownership of the line was transferred from VicRail to the Emerald Tourist Railway Board, which in 2022 became the Puffing Billy Railway Board.

== Platforms and services ==
Nobelius station has one side platform. It is served by the Puffing Billy Railway, a heritage railway running steam locomotives as a tourist service. In ordinary circumstances, Puffing Billy tickets passing Nobelius station can only be purchased as return journeys departing from and returning to Belgrave. As a tourist line, tickets are significantly more expensive than commuter public transit, and must be purchased in advance. The train does not typically stop at Nobelius, though this could occur in special circumstances and may be possible to arrange such as through a chartered train.
