= Nobelius Siding =

Railway station in Victoria, Australia

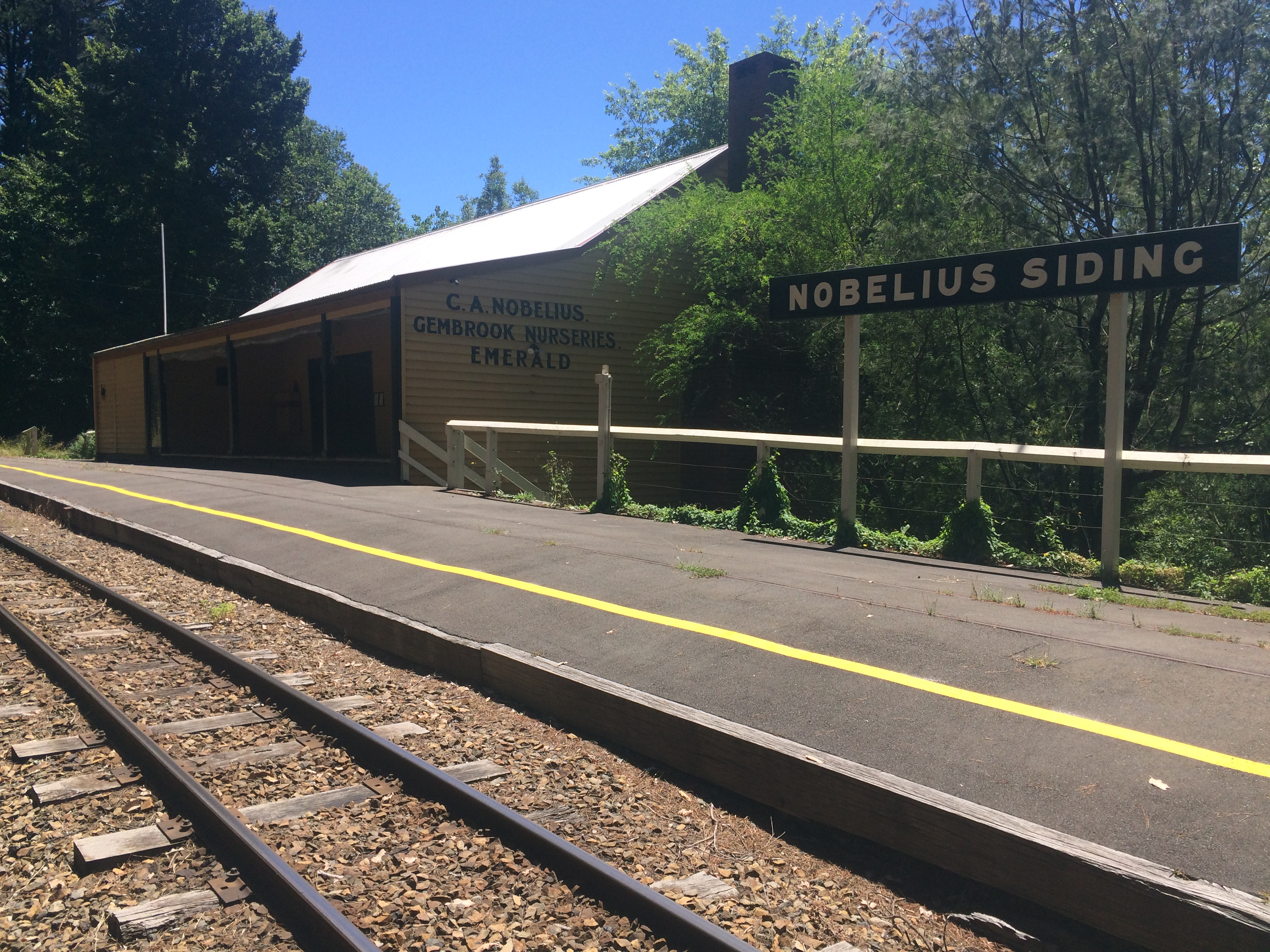
- The railway siding and former packing shed, in 2023

General information
- Location: Crichton Road, Emerald VIC 3782; Australia
- Coordinates: 37°55′54.5″S 145°26′58″E
- System: Puffing Billy Railway station
- Lines: Puffing Billy Railway; Gembrook railway line (former)
- Distance: 52.44 km (32.58 mi) from Flinders Street
- Platforms: 1
- Tracks: 2

Other information
- Status: Unstaffed

History
- Opened: 11 December 1904; 121 years ago

Services
Preceding station	Puffing Billy Railway	Following station
Emerald towards Belgrave	Gembrook line	Nobelius towards Gembrook
Location

Nobelius Siding is a heritage-listed railway siding situated on the Puffing Billy Railway in Emerald, Victoria, Australia. The siding and adjacent packing shed were built in 1904. They served C.A. Nobelius' Gembrook Nurseries, which was once the largest nursery in the Southern Hemisphere and which used the siding to export seedlings and plants around Australia and the world. Now part of the Nobelius Heritage Park, the former packing shed was restored by Puffing Billy volunteers and is used by the railway as a function centre.

== Description ==
Nobelius Siding is located on the southern edge of the Nobelius Heritage Park in Emerald, a town in the periurban fringe of Greater Melbourne, Australia. Accessible via Crichton Road, it is in the close vicinity of the Emerald and District Museum and along the route of several walking tracks. The station is one of few in Victoria not belonging to VicTrack; instead, it is owned and operated by the Puffing Billy Railway Board, and is serviced by heritage steam locomotives on the Puffing Billy Railway. Located 52.44 km (32.58 mi) by rail from Flinders Street Station and 10.58 km (6.57 mi) from the start of its line in Belgrave, it lies between Emerald station (up-line towards Belgrave) and Nobelius station (down-line towards Gembrook).

Platform at Nobelius Siding, Nov 2026

Today, Nobelius Siding is a short single side platform on the main line; the original siding has been paved over with asphalt to form the new platform surface. A wooden edge forms the boundary of the asphalt platform, with a yellow painted line demarcating safe areas and the original siding's tracks visible in the platform's centre. A sign reading 'Nobelius Siding' in the line's signature white text on black background is positioned further down the platform. Behind the platform, the Packing Shed has a loading bay opening onto the siding. The platform can be reached via an accessible asphalt ramp on the up-line side of the Packing Shed, or through stairs from the small unsealed car park on the down-line side.

Nobelius Packing Shed, view from up-line on Crichton Road

The Packing Shed is a two-storey light buff-painted weatherboard structure on Crichton Road. Text reading "C.A. Nobelius / Gembrook Nurseries / Emerald" is visible from the station in both directions, and white text painted on red facing Crichton Road announces "Nobelius Nurseries / Weekend Trading". The Shed is accessible from entrances on Crichton Road and on the siding platform. The interior of the Packing Shed has been renovated into a rustic function room with space for 80 seated or 100 cocktail guests, which is available for hire for weddings and other functions; its position on the railway allows the use of Puffing Billy trains for event transport. The Packing Shed is also used as a venue for Puffing Billy’s various evening dining experiences, such as "Murder on the Puffing Billy Express".

== History ==
=== Original service ===
In 1886, Carl Axel Nobelius—a Swedish emigrant to Australia and cousin to Alfred Nobel—purchased approximately 25 hectares (63 acres) of subdivided forest land from selector H.B. Koenig. By 1898, he was operating a wholesale nursery with twenty hectares under cultivation and six hectares of orchard. At this time, to transport the nursery's produce to consumers required a 22 km (14 mi) journey by bullock dray over rough country and unmade roads to the railway station at Narre Warren. Nobelius was one of thirteen local witnesses to in 1898 give evidence to the Parliamentary Standing Committee on Railways advocating for the opening of a line between Ferntree Gully and Gembrook, infrastructure that would greatly reduce the difficulty of exporting produce. The Committee accepted their proposal, and by 1900 the Gembrook line opened running alongside Nobelius' growing nursery property.

Nobelius was granted special permission to install a railway siding—the Nobelius Siding—and packing shed on his property. These opened on 11 December 1904, allowing nursery workers to load fruit and trees directly onto rail carts from their production site. As of 1905, the nurseries had grown to occupy 113 ha (280 acres) with over a million saleable trees. In 1911, the Dandenong Advertiser recorded 2.5 million trees "in the various stages of growth," with nearly 1000 unique species of fruit tree and 120 species of shelter of ornamental tree; at its peak in 1914, the nursery had two million trees for sale alone. The Nobelius Siding, capable of handling 250,000 cases of fruit annually, facilitated the exports of what was then the largest nursery in the Southern Hemisphere, with the fruit and tree stock loaded into NQR trucks here reaching destinations including the Americas, India, Japan, South Africa, France, the Netherlands, and the United Kingdom.

The Nobelius Siding Packing Shed on the Gembrook line in 1911

The First World War significantly hurt the nursery's export business, though by 1920 it was recovering and diversifying to include forty hectares of flax in its production—an investment which prompted calls for a second siding further down the line. At its greatest physical extent, it covered 650 ha (1606 acres). In December 1921, Carl Axel Nobelius died of pneumonia; his sons retained some of his land, but the majority of his nursery was purchased by two syndicates which transformed it into the Emerald Country Club Estate and the Nobelius Station Estates.

Approximately five hectares (twelve acres) of the property held by Nobelius Station Estates continued to operate as a nursery, at one point owned by Aspro manufacturer Alfred Michael Nicholas. Three of Carl Axel's sons remained involved in the business which Nicholas later sold to Clifford, the long-time manager. Renovations in the 1930s added fireplaces and chimneys to the Packing Shed, which hosted the business office of the reduced C. A. Nobelius and Sons nursery. Throughout the changes in ownership, the Nobelius Siding remained in operation—if on a reduced scale—even into the years immediately prior to the line's official closure in April 1954.

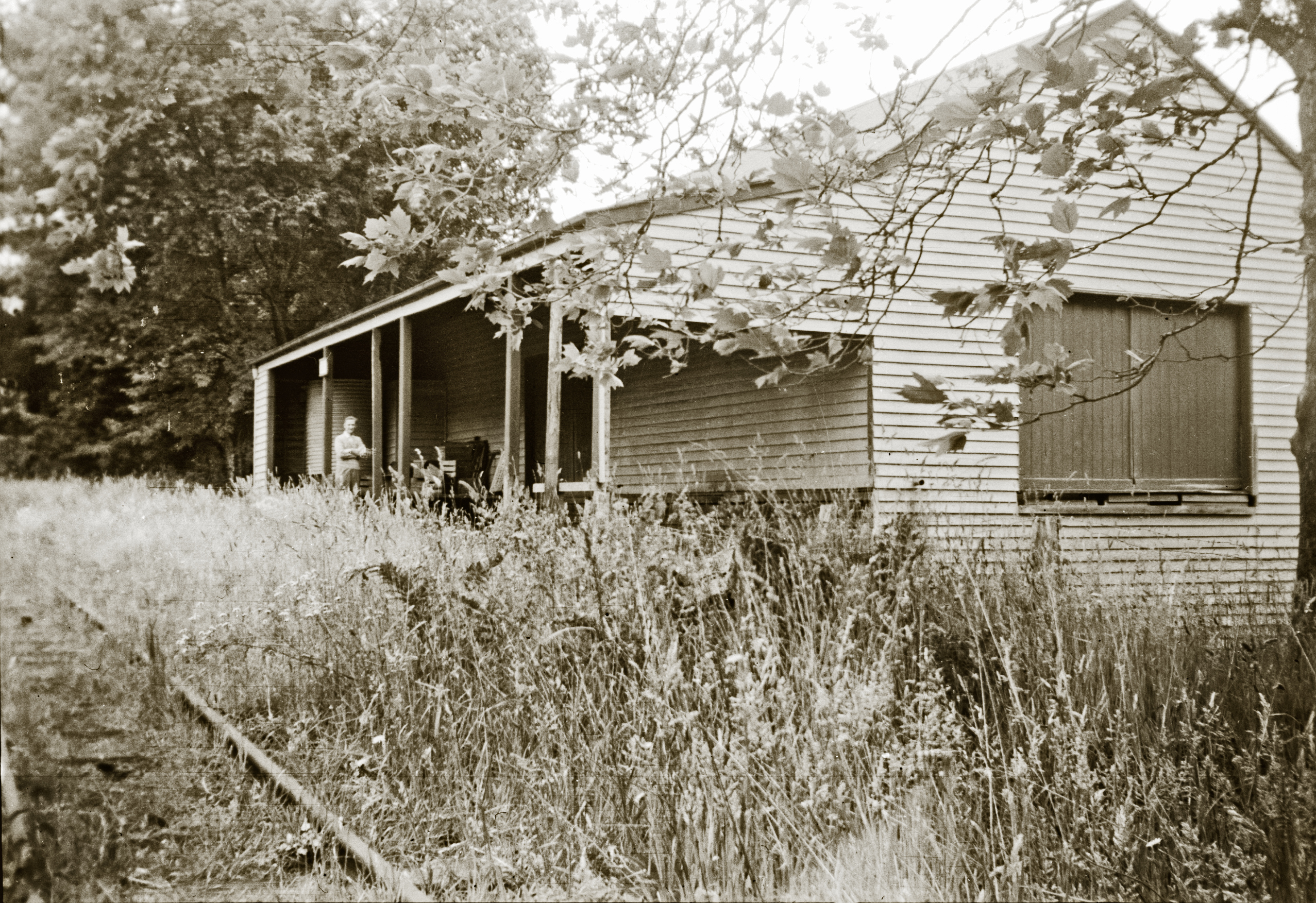
Nobelius Siding c. 1956, after the railway's closure

=== Preservation ===
The line past Nobelius Siding reopened as part of the Puffing Billy tourist heritage railway on 18 October 1975 when the line was extended from Emerald to Lakeside. At this point, the nursery property was owned by Din San Nurseries. In 1981, the nursery closed after almost a century of cultivation; the land was purchased by the Shire of Sherbrooke with State financial assistance in response to community lobbying and the site's historical importance. By 1987, the Packing Shed—then unused for decades—had been restored and its interior had been renovated. As part of the restoration, the original siding tracks were paved over with asphalt to form a new platform, transforming Nobelius Siding into a stop on the main line. The nursery remnant reopened in 1993 as the Victorian heritage-listed Nobelius Heritage Park complex, incorporating the Nobelius Siding and Packing Shed.

On 1 October 1977, the line—including the Nobelius Siding—became property of the Emerald Tourist Railway Board, which in 2022 became the Puffing Billy Railway Board. The Puffing Billy Railway has since its restoration used the Siding and Packing Shed as a space for functions, dinners, and special events.

== Platforms and services ==
Nobelius Siding has one side platform. It is served by the Puffing Billy Railway, a heritage railway running steam locomotives as a tourist service. In ordinary circumstances, Puffing Billy tickets passing Nobelius Siding can only be purchased as return journeys departing from and returning to Belgrave. As a tourist line, tickets are significantly more expensive than commuter public transit, and must be purchased in advance. The train does not typically stop at Nobelius Siding, although this occasionally occurs in special circumstances such as the railway's 'Murder on the Puffing Billy Express' event; it can also be arranged for pre-planned functions.
