= Fielder railway station =

Railway station in Victoria, Australia

Fielder
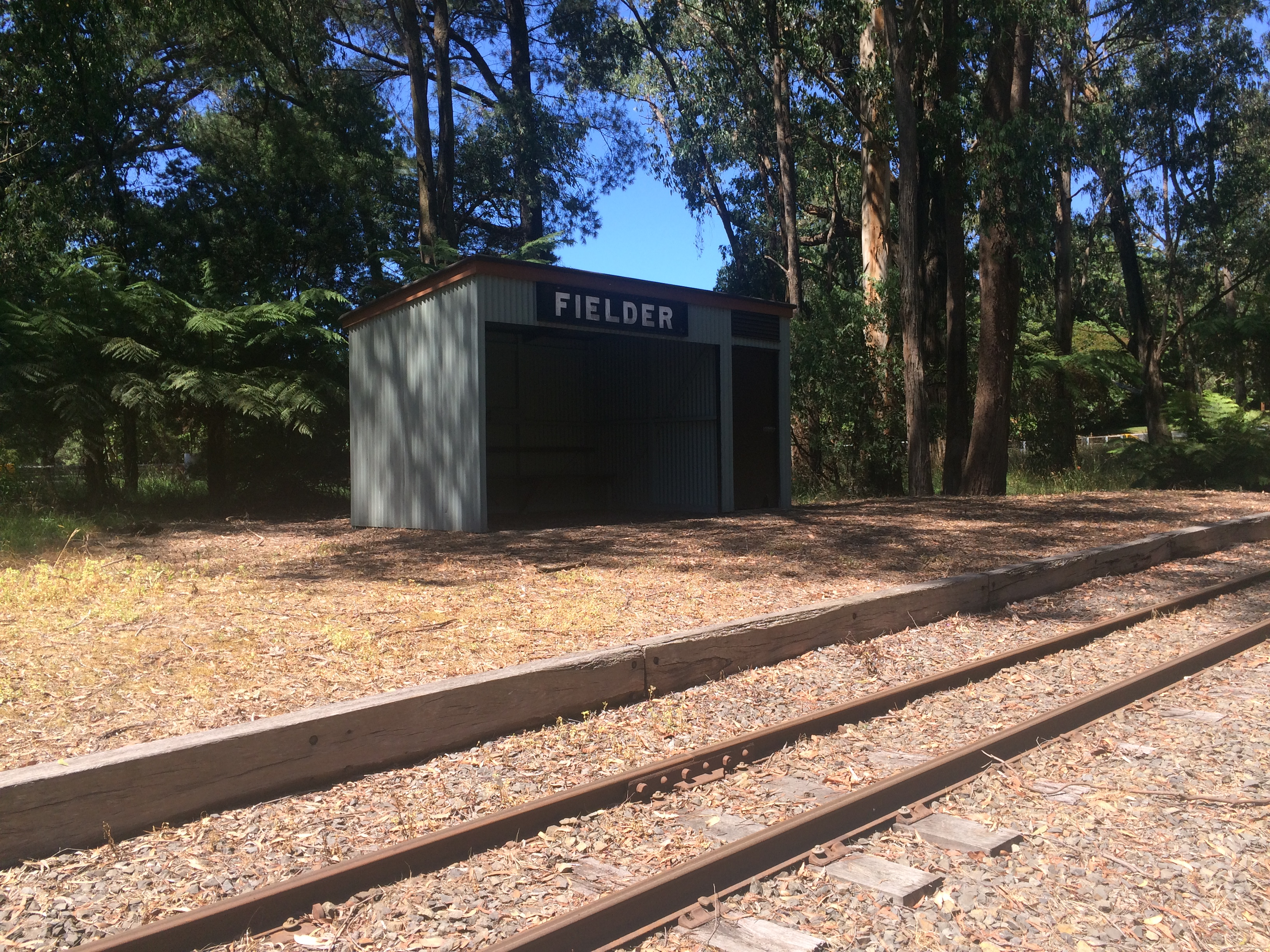
- Fielder station and platform, January 2022.

General information
- Coordinates: 37°56′48″S 145°30′19″E
- System: Puffing Billy Railway station
- Lines: Puffing Billy Railway; Gembrook railway line (former)
- Distance: 61.18 km (38.02 mi) from Flinders Street
- Platforms: 1
- Tracks: 1

Other information
- Status: Unstaffed

Services
Preceding station	Puffing Billy Railway	Following station
Cockatoo towards Belgrave	Gembrook line	Gembrook Terminus
Location

Fielder railway station is situated on the Puffing Billy Railway in Australia.

It opened as a Stopping Place on Monday 10 September 1928, as part of the Gembrook railway line. It was originally an unnamed platform, with time tables noting a station at 38 miles (61 km). In 1929, local Harry Watson constructed a Mallee shed and unofficially named it Ancaster after his home town in Lincolnshire, England, but this was quickly changed by some children to Laura, who was a young local girl. The Victorian Railways officially named it Fielder from Tuesday 5 February 1929, after a nearby resident. It was planned to name the station after the two local residents Cullen and Fielder and combinations of the two names were suggested, however Fielder was the name finally chosen. It remained nothing more than a Mallee shed with small office and a name board for the rest of its operating life.

It was closed with the line on 30 April 1954 and the Mallee shed was sold to US Buslines for unknown use. After closure, the site fell into disrepair, and by the 1990s, little trace of Fielder remained. However, by that time, efforts were being made to extend the railway from Lakeside through to Gembrook, which would complete the entire length of the original line. In 1996, a group of volunteers led by Richard Schurmann in collaboration with the descendants of the Fielder family rebuilt the platform and waiting shed, which was officially re-opened on Saturday 19 April 1997 in preparation for the extension of the line which re-opened in 1998.

On 18 November 2012 a plaque was unveiled on the station shed in tribute to the Fielder Family.

Trains do not normally stop at Fielder.
