= Nobelius Heritage Park complex =

Former nursery and associated facilities in Melbourne, Australia

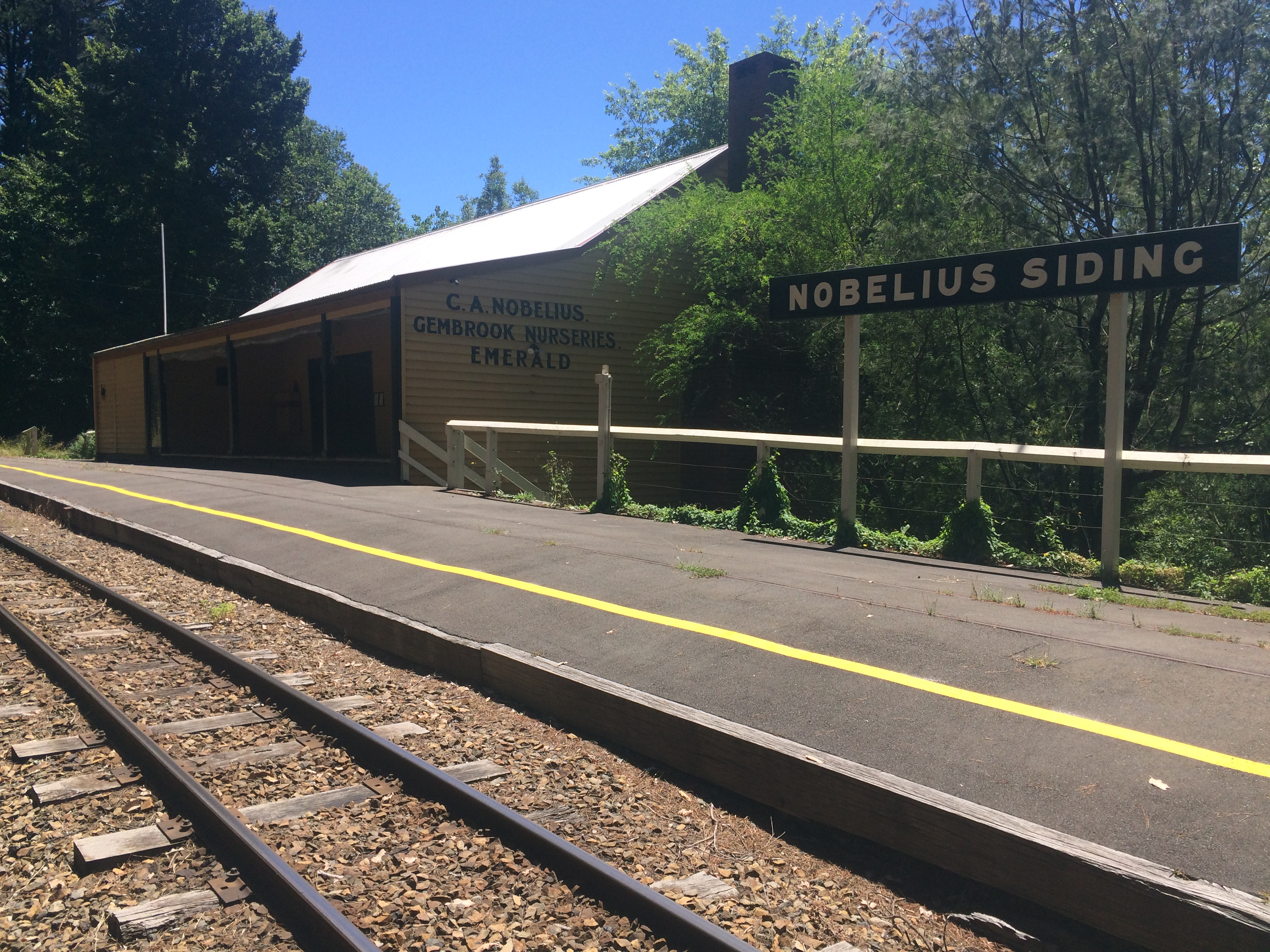
- The railway siding and former packing shed, in 2023

- Location of the house in Greater Metropolitan Melbourne

General information
- Status: Completed
- Type: Former nursery; heritage park; history museum; railway infrastructure; homestead
- Architectural style: International style
- Location: Emerald Lake Road and Princess Avenue, Emerald, Shire of Cardinia, Melbourne, Victoria, Australia
- Coordinates: 37°55′51″S 145°26′58″E
- Named for: Carl Axel Nobelius
- Year built: 1886–1904
- Completed: 1904; 122 years ago
- Client: Carl Axel Nobelius
- Owner: Shire of Cardinia (since 1981)

Technical details
- Material: limestone; reinforced concrete; concrete bricks
- Grounds: 4.5 ha (11 acres)

Website
- emeraldmuseum.org.au

Victorian Heritage Register
- Official name: Nobelius nursery, packing shed, and railway siding
- Type: Registered place
- Designated: 14 June 2012
- Reference no.: H2285
- Heritage overlay no.: HO273
- Category: Parks, Gardens and Trees

Register of the National Estate
- Official name: Nobelius Nursery
- Type: Defunct register
- Designated: undated
- Reference no.: 100546

Register of the National Estate
- Official name: Emerald Country Club Estate
- Type: Defunct register
- Designated: undated
- Reference no.: 100550

The Nobelius Heritage Park complex, incorporating the Emerald Museum and the Emerald Country Club, is a heritage-listed former nursery including associated infrastructure, heritage park and history museum, railway siding, and homestead, located in Emerald, in the Shire of Cardinia, in the Dandenong Ranges, east of Melbourne, in Victoria, Australia.

The four-and-a-half-hectare (11-acre) remnants of the former Nobelius Nursery, now known as the Nobelius Heritage Park, was once part of the vast Gembrook Nurseries, developed from 1886 by Carl Axel Nobelius (1851–1921), which became one of Australia's foremost plant nurseries of the early twentieth century.

Located on the traditional lands of the Kulin Nation, the former nursery, former packing shed, and former railway siding were added to the Victorian Heritage Register on 14 June 2012 in recognition of their historical and scientific (botanical) significance. Various other elements of the complex were also added to non-statutory lists by the Victorian branch of the National Trust on 23 November 1994 and the now defunct Register of the National Estate on an unknown date.

== History ==
Carl Nobelius bought 25 hectares (62 acres) of forested land near Emerald in 1886 and established first a small orchard and then, in 1892, the Gembrook Nursery, named after the parish. The business grew rapidly, and to avoid the difficulties of road transportation for his fruit and nursery stock, Nobelius became a strong advocate for the construction of the narrow gauge railway line, now known as the Puffing Billy line. By 1900 the line was built and in 1904 permission was given to Nobelius to build a siding and packing shed adjacent to land newly-acquired for the nursery.

By World War I the nursery, which was run as a family business by Nobelius and his four sons, held two million stock trees, produced large quantities of fruit, and conducted a huge export trade with other Australian states and overseas. In 1920 the nursery was said to be the largest in the southern hemisphere, and at its greatest extent covered 650 hectares (1,600 acres), including the land occupied by the present Emerald Lake Park and Emerald Country Resort. However the outbreak of World War I largely destroyed the export trade, and after Nobelius's death in 1921 the nursery and orchards were subdivided and sold. Nobelius's sons Cliff and Arch regained control of this small part of the nursery and continued the business until 1955. The nursery closed in 1981 after two changes of ownership and the last remnant of the historic nursery was purchased by the former Sherbrooke Council to become the Nobelius Heritage Park, which focuses on the preservation and recording of the history of the area and its horticultural industries.

== Description ==
=== Heritage park ===
Part of the former nursery, now a heritage park, retains many examples of the trees planted by Nobelius and his sons, including two notable specimens: a rare Rewarewa (Knightia excelsa), the largest specimen of this rare tree in Victoria; and an outstanding specimen of the cut-leaf black alder (Alnus glutinosa 'Laciniata' ). The heritage park also retains remnants of old nursery stock and features characteristic of the former nursery such as rows of trees planted at right angles to the contours. A dominant element in views from the nursery site is the two-storey timber packing shed adjacent to the Nobelius Siding on the Puffing Billy Railway. Many of the plants in the park were planted after the Nobelius era. There are plantations of lavender, rosemary, raspberries, eucalypts, New Zealand flax and fruit and ornamental trees established by Gus Ryberg, who once worked for the Nobelius nursery, as reminders of former Nobelius ventures and other local industries.

=== Emerald Country Club estate ===
Part of the northern portion that was subdivided and sold now contains the Emerald Country Club, established in the mid-1920s, although not part of the listing on the Victorian Heritage Register. A nine-hole golf course was designed by John Young and constructed by Emerald Proprietary Ltd, completed between 1925 and 1928. While the clubhouse was under construction, the old Nobelius home, Carramar, was operated as temporary clubrooms. The new building was completed in 1929 and included local pink stone in its construction obtained from a quarry opened specifically for the purpose on the property. The clubhouse was featured in the February 1930 edition of Australian Home Beautiful and extolled the virtues of country clubs. The architects were disclosed as Cowper, Murphy, and Appleford, and in 1930 the reporter described their building as 'worthy of its surroundings'.

For a time membership of the club was restricted to those who purchased land in the country club estate but this idea was adversely affecged by the depression. The estate comprised generous two-thousand-square-metre (one-half-acre) allotments in the area bounded by Lakeside Drive, Sycamore Crescent, Poplar Crescent, Elm Crescent and Oak Avenue, all names redolent of the former nursery use. Cottages of members were vetted by the committee to ensure that each had 'some distinctive quality of planning and building', to be of a minimum size, and boundary fences were prohibited. The early date of such cottages is something of a mystery as the country club estate subdivision was not formally approved until 1931. Carramar, the Nobelius residence was retained on a handsome allotment, its subdivision not occurring until 1956.

=== Railway siding and packing shed ===
The siding and packing shed in 2023

The siding was built in 1904 to serve the adjacent packing shed, built in the same year, from which nursery seedlings and plants were shipped throughout Australia by Gembrook Nurseries. The former packing shed was restored by volunteers from the Puffing Billy Railway and is used by the railway as a function centre.

=== Emerald Museum ===
The Emerald Museum contains an important collection of relics from the Nobelius Nursery, which includes ledgers, wages books, stock records dating from the 1890s, original catalogues, tools and photographs, and is considered to be a unique record of the nursery industry in Victoria.

== See also ==
- List of places on the Victorian Heritage Register in the Shire of Cardinia
- Puffing Billy Railway
