= Emerald railway station, Victoria =

Railway station in Victoria, Australia

Emerald
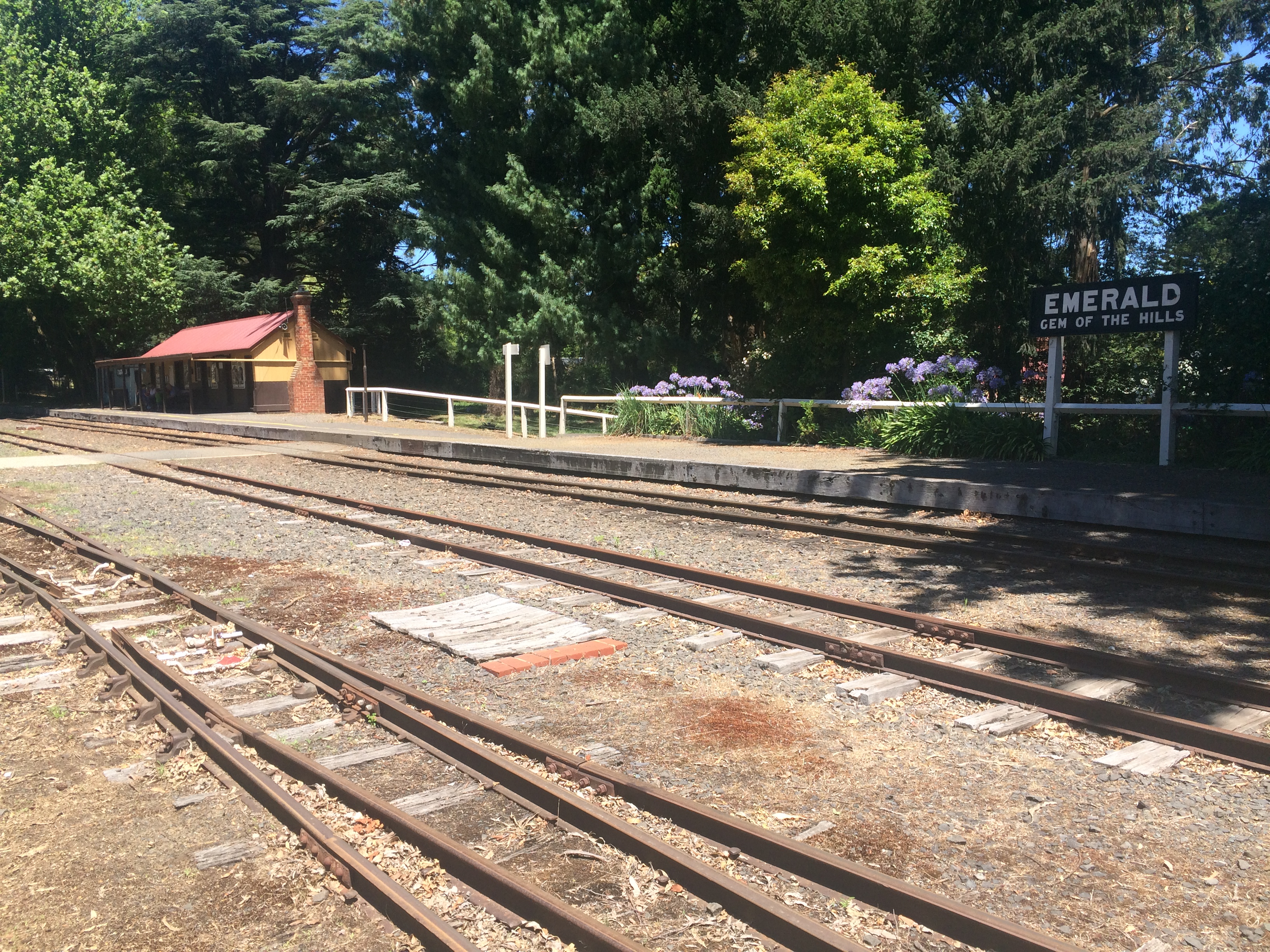
- Emerald station and platform, January 2022

General information
- Location: Emerald VIC 3782; Australia
- Coordinates: 37°56′02″S 145°26′23″E
- Elevation: 319 m (1047 ft)
- System: Puffing Billy Railway station
- Lines: Puffing Billy Railway; Gembrook railway line (former)
- Distance: 51.44 km (31.96 mi) from Flinders Street
- Platforms: 1
- Tracks: 5

Other information
- Status: Periodically staffed

History
- Opened: 18 December 1900; 125 years ago

Services
Preceding station	Puffing Billy Railway	Following station
Clematis towards Belgrave	Gembrook line	Nobelius Siding towards Gembrook
Former Services
Preceding station	VicRail	Following station
Clematis towards Upper Ferntree Gully	Gembrook line	Nobelius Siding towards Gembrook
Location

Emerald railway station is a narrow-gauge tourist heritage railway station operated by the Puffing Billy Railway in Victoria, Australia. It opened with the Gembrook railway line on 18 December 1900 and comprised a platform track and a loop siding. It closed on 30 April 1954 with the line, before reopening as a terminus of the Puffing Billy heritage service on 31 July 1965. It has since returned to being a through-station following the line's 1975 extension to Lakeside.

== Description ==
Emerald Station is located within the town of the same name in the periurban eastern fringe of Greater Melbourne, Victoria, Australia. It is nearby to the Kilvington Road shopping village and beside a small park. The station is one of few in Victoria not belonging to VicTrack. Instead, it is owned and operated by the Puffing Billy Railway Board, and is serviced by heritage steam locomotives on the Puffing Billy Railway. It lies between Clematis Station (up-line towards Belgrave) and the Nobelius Siding (down-line towards Gembrook). It is 51.44 km (31.96 mi) from Flinders Street Station and 9.7 km (6 mi) from the start of its line at Belgrave. Emerald is the highest station on the line at an altitude of 318.5 m (1045 feet).

Emerald has one ground-level side platform, with a gravel surface for most of its length and concrete directly in front of the station building. The main building—the only original station building remaining intact on the line—maintains its 1900 timber construction and gabled corrugated iron roof, with a verandah extending into the platform. The building retains a Victorian Railways colour scheme, with a dado (the lower section of the wall) in dark terracotta and the upper section in a light buff with dark brown trimmings. Besides the station building on the platform is a newer corrugated iron shed bearing the Emerald sign, marked as a change room; further down the platform a brick public toilet structure beside one pedestrian access path replicates the colour scheme of the station building. Up the platform, there is a second pedestrian access path and several asphalt pedestrian crossings over the lines; there is also another station sign labelling Emerald the 'Gem of the Hills'.

Emerald station in 2015, maintaining a similar colour scheme to that used by Victorian Railways.

The station yard includes several maintenance sheds and other structures. There are two corrugated iron sheds at the down end of the station, with one serving as the Puffing Billy Railway Signals and Telegraph Depot and the other as a carriage repair workshop. At the up end there are further modern maintenance structures, and a rail turntable. The single track of the Puffing Billy Line splits into three for most of the platform's length, but has a maximum of five concurrent tracks allowing access to the maintenance buildings.

== History ==
=== Original service ===
In 1898, thirteen local individuals including Carl Axel Nobelius—owner of a large nursery in the Emerald area—gave evidence to the Parliamentary Standing Committee on Railways advocating for the installation of a railway from Ferntree Gully to Gembrook. Previously, Emerald and other nearby towns had been reliant on bullock drays to transport goods to railway connections in Narre Warren; a dedicated railway into the Dandenongs would facilitate a significant expansion of commerce in the region.

The railway opened on 18 December 1900, with Emerald as one of the line's five original stations. This was just before the Christmas and New Years holiday period, and quickly attracted significant patronage from tourists visiting the hills. Within weeks, food and drink was made available at Emerald Station in response to visitor complaints of the scarcity of refreshments and accommodation.

Emerald Station was built approximately 400 metres ("a full quarter of a mile") from Emerald's 1900 town centre at what is now Kilvington Drive, necessitating the construction of a new road to the station by the Fern Tree Gully Shire Council. Several new businesses quickly opened near the station, including the Emerald Coffee Palace and Emerald Grocery opening in 1901. Photographs from as early as 1907 show the swift formation around the station of what became the town's secondary centre. Population growth as the railway was under construction also drove demand for a school from 1899, with one opening as soon as 7 February, 1901; by 1909, it had relocated to a location nearer the station and the secondary town centre.

Photograph of Station Road, Emerald, c. 1907 with the train line in the background and several buildings including the Emerald Coffee Palace in the foreground.

Emerald station in its initial form was "a long building made up of two portables plus one separate one on the up end." In the area around it, trees were essentially absent but efforts were ongoing to establish a garden, and the word 'Emerald' was laid out to display in white stones. By c. 1910, the station building featured a standard corrugated iron water tank, and around it were rows of tree ferns, shrubs, and plane trees. Signalling facilities around Emerald were installed through the 1900s, with Emerald capable of functioning as a temporary staff and ticket station and block post from 23 October, 1911. By 8 November 1915, Emerald was established as a permanent staff and ticket station, dividing the Gembrook line into two signalling sections. By this era it was installed with two standard No. 2 Victorian Railways kerosene pillar lamps, with a lamp room initially situated at the up end of the platform and later moved to the down end. Photographs from 1910 indicate the wooden station building's use of one of that era's signature Victorian Railways colour schemes, with the lower section of the building in dark terracotta topped by a black line and the upper section in a mid brown with trimmings of dark brown.

Emerald railway station, Victoria, c. 1910s, with waiting passengers and an incoming train

The station building featured a waiting room with a brick chimney, intended to keep passengers warm in cold weather. In 1908, travelers complained that the fire was often left unignited, which the Dandenong Advertiser attributed to a lack of fuel supplied. The verandah was also considered insufficient, with motions in 1917 advocating for its lengthening to allow rain shelter for more passengers. In 1921, "the Misses Slees"—Miss A. Slee and an unidentified other—opened a tea and coffee stall and refreshment room at the station with the permission of Victorian Railways, a development welcomed by The Mountaineer. According to local testimony, the refreshment room remained until 1941. Emerald also hosted a five-roomed departmental residence on the down side of the station.

Through the mid 1910s and into the 1920s, Emerald experienced growing prosperity in part thanks to an increasing flow of train-born visitors, becoming the district's main commercial centre and sometimes being called the 'Gem of the Ranges'. In 1919, Emerald is recorded as receiving 5830 visiting passengers, the most of any station past Belgrave. While numbers had declined by 1930, attractions such as the Emerald market, the early 1920s opening of the country club and January 1941's Emerald Park continued to drive visitors to the station. The opening of Lakeside station beside Emerald Lake in January 1944 drew day-trippers away from Emerald.

Emerald Station closed with the Gembrook line in 1954, following declining incomes and a landslide interrupting service up the line in 1953; the line was officially closed on 30 April, and by 13 July Emerald was closed to all rail traffic.

=== Preservation ===
When the line was reopened from Menzies Creek by the Puffing Billy Preservation Society the intent had been to have Lakeside, not Emerald, as the terminus and so water tanks had been provided at the former. However, trains only ran as far as Emerald between 1965 and 1975, and engines needed to refill their water tanks before returning to Belgrave. The short-term solution was to make use of wagon 149NQ, which had been fitted with a 2,000 imp gal (9,100 L) water tank and could be refilled by the Emerald Rural Fire Brigade as required. Later, a well was bored out and connected to a 5,000 imp gal (23,000 L) water tank, which refilled at a rate of about 100 imp gal (450 L) per hour.

In 1967 a new carriage workshop was opened behind the former goods yard.

Emerald Railway Station; taken on Kodak Easy Load 35 KE60

In preservation the station building has been judged "the most intact on the line, with at least part of the original building surviving in its original location". The current station building incorporates the original timber structure with gabled corrugated iron roof, with modifications and extensions made over time. A corrugated iron shed at the north end of the yard has been demolished, but the two structures at the south end have been present for a very long time, if not quite being original. The northern part of the station grounds are covered by a heritage overlay. The goods shed is possibly a Victorian Railways' original but not necessarily the original Emerald shed, and the recreated stockyard and loading platform at the Kilvington Road end are on the correct site but use elements recovered from the Wonthaggi saleyards. There may also have been a residence just south of the station.

In the 1990s a 50 ft (15 m) turntable was provided in the north-west quadrant of the yard, fitted with both 5 ft 3 in (1,600 mm) and 2 ft 6 in (762 mm) rails in a gauntlet formation.

== Platforms and services ==
Emerald has one platform. It is served by the Puffing Billy Railway, a heritage railway running steam locomotives as a tourist service. In ordinary circumstances, Puffing Billy tickets passing Emerald can only be purchased as return journeys departing from and returning to Belgrave, though the train does frequently stop at Emerald. As a tourist line, tickets are significantly more expensive than commuter public transit, and must be purchased in advance. Occasional special events such as the annual Community Open Day facilitate alternate access, in that case with free tickets offered to those living within 10 km of a Puffing Billy station and an extended one hour stop at Emerald Station and several other locations allowing passengers to visit the town.
