= Emerald Carriage Workshops =

Railway workshops in Emerald, Victoria, Australia

Coordinates: 37.933737301097956°S 145.43994067677107°E

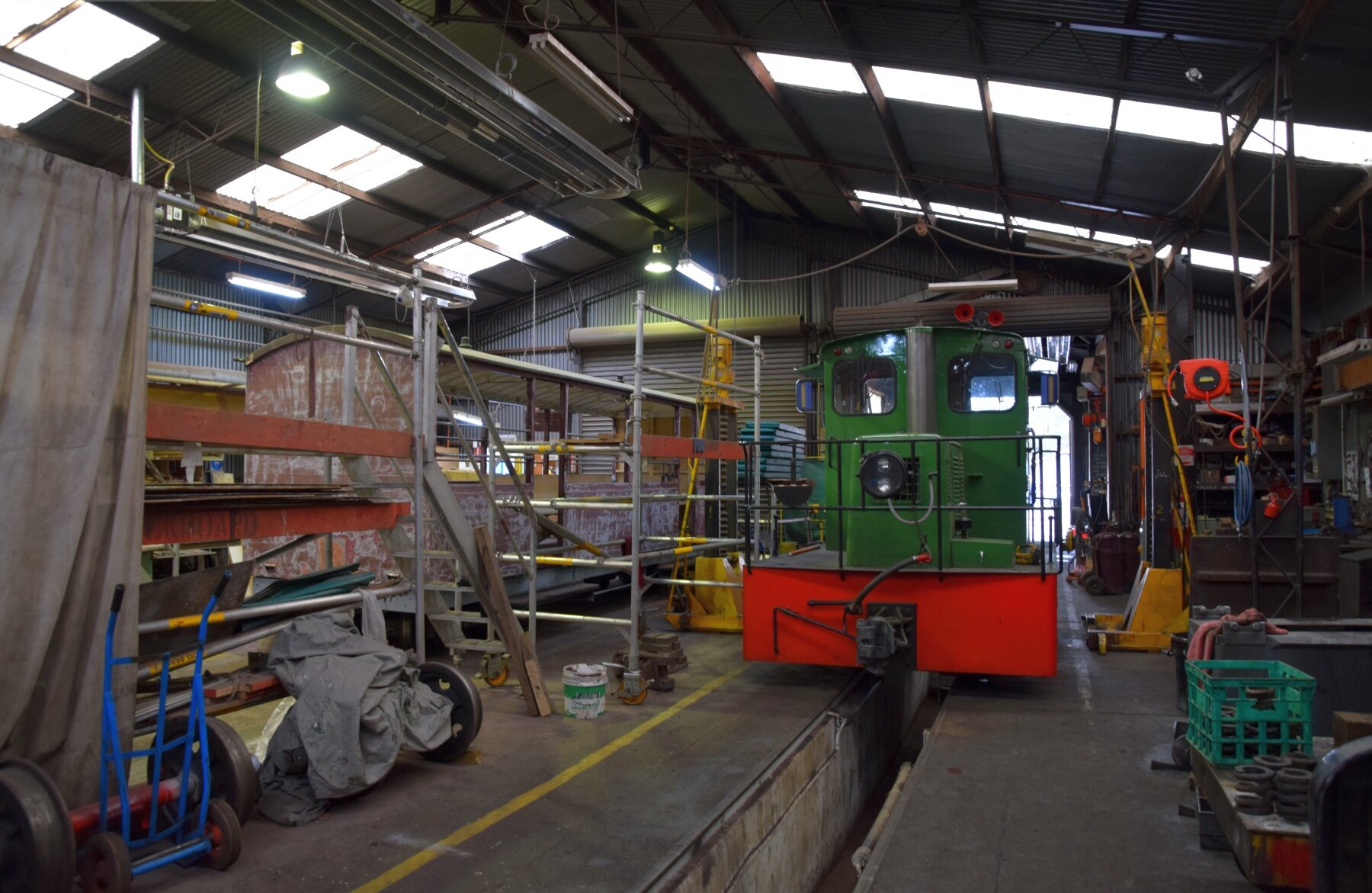
- NRT1 in No.5 Road at Emerald Carriage Workshops, 2016 (David Maciulaitis)

General information
- Location: Emerald, Victoria 3782
- Owner: Puffing Billy Railway
- Line: Gembrook
- Distance: 53 kilometres from Southern Cross

Construction
- Structure type: At-grade
- Accessible: No
Location

The Emerald Carriage Workshops is a facility in the Melbourne suburb of Emerald, Australia, that builds, maintains and refurbishes railway rollingstock. It is located adjacent to Emerald station on the Puffing Billy Railway.

== History ==
Historically, Victorian Railways' narrow gauge rolling stock was either maintained on site, or for heavier repairs, vehicles were transferred to and from Newport Workshops in the centre of Melbourne. After all four narrow gauge railways closed in the 1950s this practice ceased, although some locomotives were stored at the Workshops pending a decision for their future. As the Puffing Billy Railway grew, so did the need for their own on-site maintenance facilities.

In 1964 the Puffing Billy Railway was preparing to restore the line from Menzies Creek to Emerald. On 23 July 1964 the Society asked the Victorian Railways for permission to construct a carriage workshop in the station yard, for the purpose of painting and other general repairs. In March 1966 the site north-east of Emerald Railway Station had been cleared and two new tracks, No.4 and No.5, were added. The new workshop structure was completed in June 1967, and the first vehicles maintained on site were 1NBL and 13NU. In 1983 shunting locomotive NRT1 was restored to service, and became the dedicated site shunting locomotive.

The workshop site is fairly limited, with room for only three carriages to be worked on at any given time. A new engine shed was constructed later at Belgrave station, and in 1978 that facility opened as a locomotive workshop. Other maintenance facilities on the railway include an under-rail inspection pit at Menzies Creek, provided sometime between 1967 and 1983.

== Carriages and wagons constructed ==
Since opening, the Puffing Billy Railway has restored a large number of locomotives, passenger and goods vehicles, but these have proven insufficient and so new carriages have been built with the involvement of the Emerald Carriage Workshops. As of 2017 fourteen additional NBH carriages had been built; timber-framed 16NBH and 17NBH were first, followed by 51NBH and 52NBH to an extended design with double-width doors and wheelchair capacity in the early 1980s. In the early 1990s five steel-framed NQR open wagons, nos 219-223, were built and fitted with seats and temporary roofs for use as emergency additional passenger capacity,, then in the leadup to the Gembrook line extension in the late 1990s the underframe design was re-used to build NBH18-23.

In the 2010s, the Puffing Billy Railway began investigating options for increasing its passenger fleet to cater for increased tourist traffic, with an interest expressed in twelve additional carriages. The underframes were constructed at Belgrave Workshops, then transferred to Emerald with the first arriving for panelling and fit-out on 11 December 2017. The vehicles entered service as 24-31NBH24-31 and 1-4NBHC.
