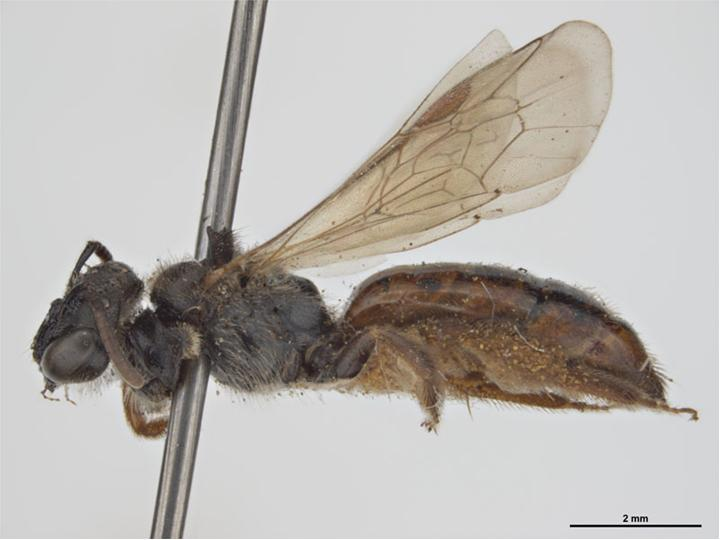
- Female

Scientific classification
- Kingdom: Animalia
- Phylum: Arthropoda
- Clade: Pancrustacea
- Class: Insecta
- Order: Hymenoptera
- Family: Colletidae
- Genus: Leioproctus
- Species: L. acaciae

Binomial name
- Leioproctus acaciae (Rayment, 1939)

Synonyms
- Euryglossidia acaciae Rayment, 1939

= Leioproctus acaciae =

Species of bee

Leioproctus acaciae, or Leioproctus (Euryglossidia) acaciae, is a species of bee in the family Colletidae and subfamily Colletinae. It is endemic to Australia. It was described by Australian entomologist Tarlton Rayment in 1939.

== Distribution and habitat ==
The species occurs in south-eastern Australia. The type locality is Emerald, Victoria.

== Behaviour ==
The adults are flying mellivores. Flowering plants visited by the bees include Acacia species.

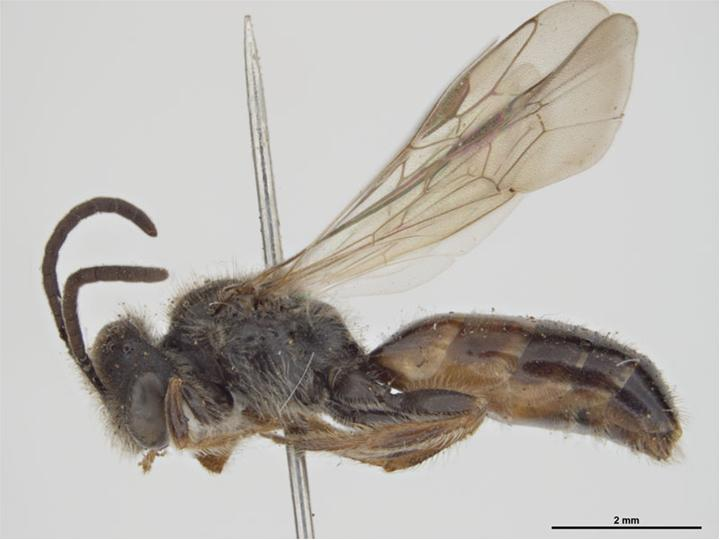
Male
