= Emerald, Victoria =

Emerald
- Suburb
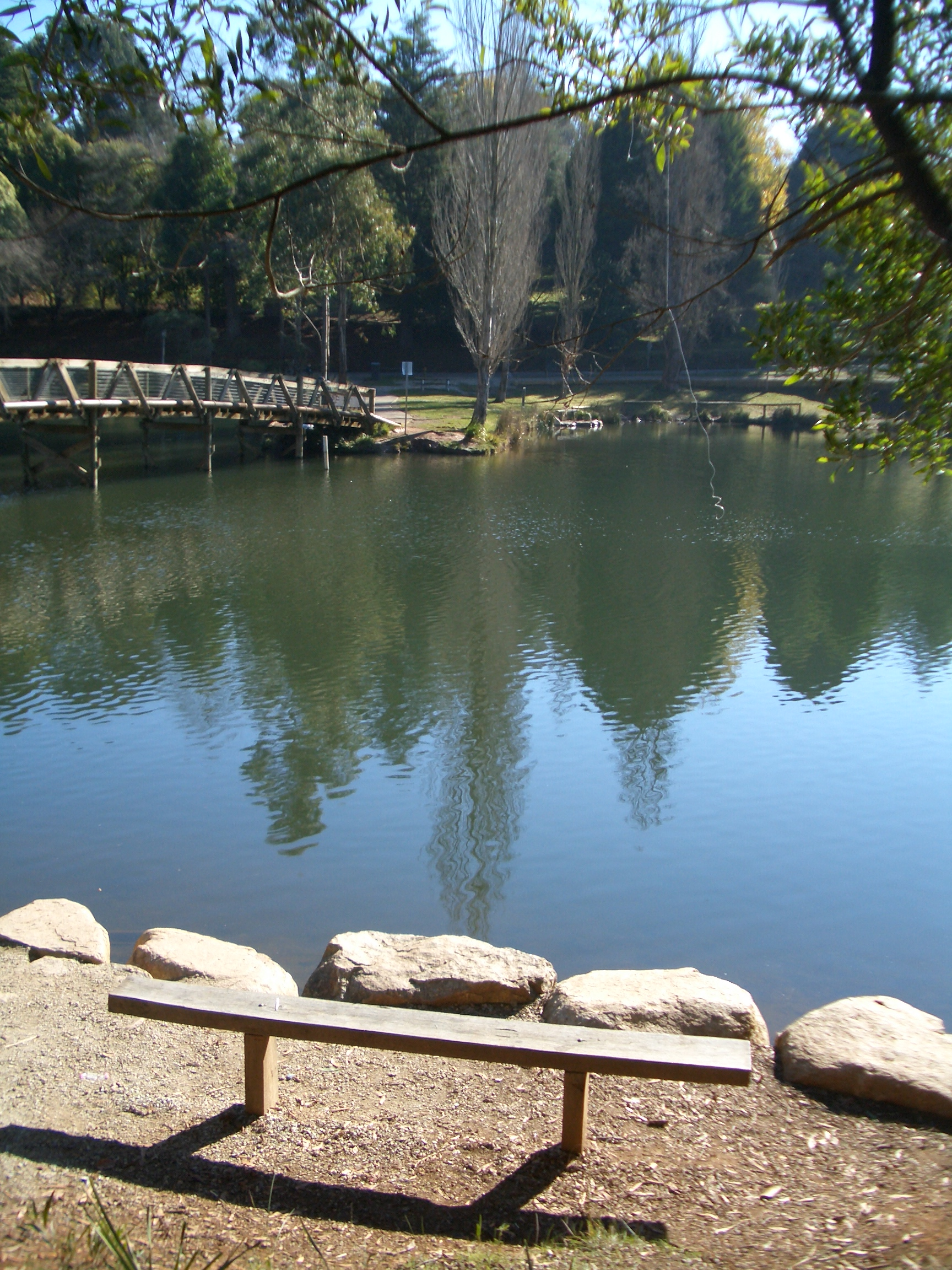
- Emerald Lake

- Interactive map of Emerald
- Coordinates: 37°55′59″S 145°26′13″E
- Country: Australia
- State: Victoria
- City: Melbourne
- LGAs: Shire of Cardinia; Shire of Yarra Ranges
- Location: 42 km (26 mi) from Melbourne; 11 km (6.8 mi) from Belgrave

Government
  - State electorate: Monbulk
  - Federal division: La Trobe

Area
  - Total: 20.3 km^{2} (7.8 sq mi)

Population
  - Total: 5,890 (2021 census)
  - Density: 290.1/km^{2} (751.5/sq mi)
- Postcode: 3782
Suburbs around Emerald
Kallista	Monbulk	Macclesfield Avonsleigh
Menzies Creek	Emerald	Cockatoo
Clematis	Dewhurst	Mount Burnett

Emerald is a town in the Greater Melbourne area of Victoria, Australia, 44 kilometres (27 mi) south-east of Melbourne's Central Business District, located within the Shires of Cardinia and Yarra Ranges local government areas. Emerald recorded a population of 5,890 at the 2021 census.

Emerald also includes Cardinia Reservoir, Melbourne's second largest reservoir.

== History ==
=== Nobelius Nursery, Post Office and Emerald Country Club ===
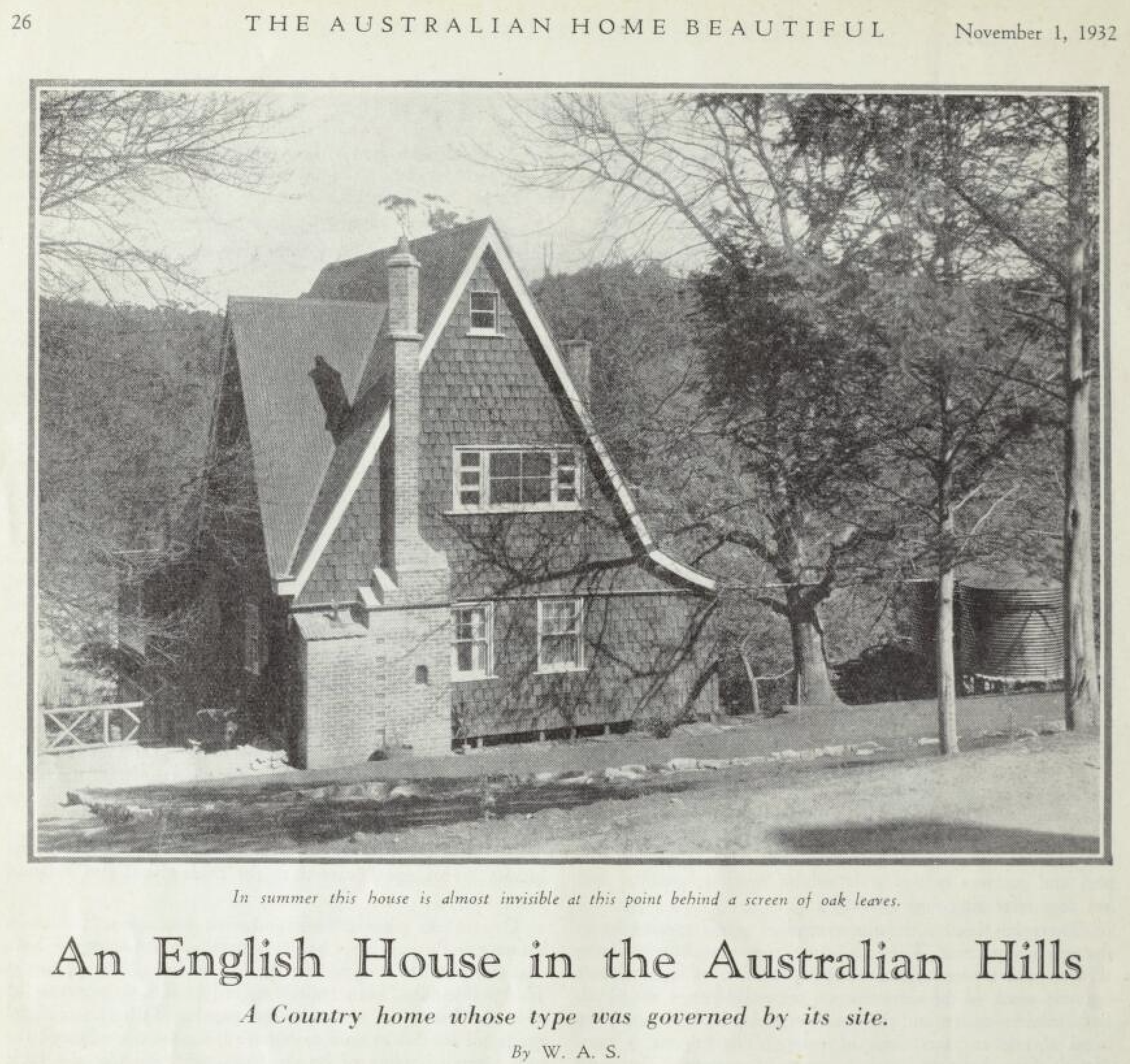
"An English House", Emerald Country Club Estate (November 1932, The Australian Home Beautiful)

Settlement of the township remained limited until the Emerald Post Office opened on 22 December 1899. With the vision of Bert S. Stillwell and Harry W. Treganowan, the Emerald Country Club was established for golf enthusiasts in 1923 and was sited on the northern portion of the original 180 hectare Nobelius Nursery, established in 1886 by Mr C. A. Nobelius.

Membership was originally only open to people who purchased land on the surrounding estate of Elm Crescent, Poplar Crescent, Sycamore Avenue, Oak Avenue, Nobelius Street and Lakeside Drive. The estate's allotments had no boundary fences and ranged in size from half an acre to several acres with the majority of the club members' residences being designed by architects Messrs Cowper, Murphy and Appleford. The houses were vetted by the committee of the Emerald Country Club to ensure that each had, according to the writer 'W.A.S.' of The Australian Home Beautiful, 'some distinctive quality of planning and building'. In 1945–7, Gordon Murphy and Reg Appleford undertook a major rebuild of Melbourne's Regent Theatre after a fire gutted the theatre's main auditorium. Murphy and Appleford, who lived at Emerald's Country Club Estate, supervised this project which included designing the theatre's Spanish Baroque-style foyer.

== Attractions ==
=== Puffing Billy and Emerald Lake ===
Emerald is known for the Emerald Lake (Lake Treganowan). The lake offers barbecue facilities, children's playgrounds, a pool, paddle boats, walking tracks, fishing, Environment Centre, model railway, café, and a railway station on the Puffing Billy Railway.

The Puffing Billy Railway is a heritage steam-operated railway, originally opened in 1900, which runs between Belgrave and Gembrook, recreating the 1920s heyday of this narrow-gauge line. It has three stations within Emerald: at Emerald itself, Nobelius and Lakeside, with Nobelius being a "stops-if-required" station. There is also Nobelius Siding, located at the former Nobelius Nurseries Packing Shed, between Emerald and Nobelius stations. It is only used for functions, or the regular "Dinner Train".

=== Other attractions ===
The areas around Emerald are excellent for finding chanterelles and other edible mushrooms, and are a popular destination for mushroom hunters each autumn.

There is also an Emerald and District museum set in the Nobelius Heritage Park. It adjoins Emerald Lake Park.

== Events ==
For many years, Emerald had an annual Carols by Candlelight at Worrell Reserve. However, it ceased to run in 2009 due to insurance issues. It moved instead to a smaller version at Saint Mark's Church.

In 2025, Emerald Lake hosts a regular 5 kilometres (3.1 mi) parkrun around Lake Nobelius and alongside the Puffing Billy Railway.

=== Emerald FunFest ===
FunFest is a day-long family street party event which kicks off the PAVE Festival which runs annually for 7–10 days in April. On FunFest day there are road closures on the northern part of Kilvington Drive, all of Puffing Billy Place and the western part of Heroes Avenue, with stalls, music, dance and free entertainment. The FunFest was preceded for many years by the Emerald WinterFest which was held annually in July.

=== Puffing Billy Running Festival ===
The Puffing Billy Running Festival is an annual event held between Belgrave and Emerald Lake. The event includes a 1.2 kilometres (0.75 mi) kids dash, 5 kilometres (3.1 mi) fun run, 13.5 kilometres (8.4 mi) classic, and a 21.1 kilometres (13.1 mi) half marathon, which has been held in the third quarter of the year since 2023.

The "Classic" is the latest incarnation of the Great Train Race (GTR) in which participants attempt to beat Puffing Billy to the finish line and is organised by volunteers of the Puffing Billy Preservation Society.

The 25th Great Train Race in 2006 had 2,403 participants. Participants of the GTR may win prizes; the first male and female runners of the GTR held on 6 May 2007 received a return flight to Antarctica as well as a unique Great Train Race trophy.

=== PAVE Arts Festival ===
The PAVE Festival is the largest festival in the Dandenong Ranges and Cardinia Shire, running over 7–10 days and incorporating all forms of the Arts. PAVE stands for "Performing And Visual arts in Emerald", which is an annual mid-April festival, started in 2006. The festival includes a number of activities taking place at different locations around Emerald over a number of days.

== Cardinia Reservoir ==
Cardinia Reservoir is situated entirely in Emerald, Victoria. It is south of the main township and the southern border of the suburb follows the Reservoir Boundary. It is the second largest reservoir in Melbourne's water supply.

=== Cardinia Reservoir Park ===
On the southern side of the reservoir there is a large park run by Parks Victoria. Facilities include barbecues and toilets and is open every day of the year. The park is home to many species of wildlife including kangaroos, wombats and possums. It is even possible to walk across one of the dam walls at the park. Despite being predominately located in the suburb of Emerald, the entrance to the park is approximately 10 minutes drive out of Emerald in Narre Warren East.

Cardinia Reservoir is the designated place to hold water when the desalination plant is operating from a pipe from Wonthaggi.

== Education ==
Emerald has a Kindergarten and a Pre School, Emerald Primary School (with roughly 400 students) which serves the local area and a secondary school, Emerald Secondary College which serves the Southern Dandenong Ranges region. Emerald has its own library at Worrell Reserve as part of the Casey Cardinia Library Corporation.

The Emerald Community House runs adult education, pre-accredited ACFE training courses and hobby courses. There are also childcare programs, out of school hours care and children's extension programs and disability services. The University of the Third Age is located in U3A House, 402 Main Street.

== Emergency services ==
Emerald has a part-time police station, a full-time ambulance station as well as a volunteer Country Fire Authority brigade. The Emerald Fire Brigade is located on Emerald-Monbulk Road near the roundabout of Belgrave-Gembrook Road, and attends approximately 190 emergency incidents per year.

The Emerald Volunteer State Emergency Service Unit is located at 277–287 Belgrave-Gembrook Road. It attends several hundred storm and wind damage incidents every year and also attends 20–30 road accidents a year for rescue purposes using such tools as the jaws of life.

== Demographics ==
Emerald's population as of the 2006 Census was 6,135 (a decrease of 9 from the 2001 census), (3,050 male, 3,085 female), 4,662 people were aged 15 years and over (2,280 male, 2,382 female) and 460 were aged 65 years and over (200 male, 260 female).

According to the 2001 Census, 17 people identified themselves as Indigenous persons (comprises Aboriginal and Torres Strait Islander).

5,461 are Australian Citizens, while 4,770 people were identified as having been born in Australia. 1,365 were born overseas. 5,608 people speak English alone.

== Sport and recreation ==
The town has an Australian Rules football team competing in the Yarra Valley Mountain District Football League and a basketball team competing in the Knox Amateur Basketball Association. Emerald also consists of a tennis club and a netball club.

Emerald is also home to Kreationz Cheerleading and Dance School where the local children and young adults compete statewide and nationally. Kreationz also perform for the locals at local fates, markets and events.

Emerald Cricket Club celebrated its 125-year anniversary in 2018.

== Media ==
=== Local media ===
Emerald receives standard Melbourne Television and radio broadcasts. However Emerald also has its own local radio station 3MDR, located in the Emerald Hall. 3MDR broadcasts are aimed at the Dandenong Ranges region with volunteer staff and announcers.

The two local newspapers are the Ranges Trader Mail and the Free Press Leader. However neither paper is actually published in Emerald.

The monthly Signpost magazine is also published in Emerald.

=== Television dramas set in Emerald ===
Solo One is a TV series screened in 1976 set in Emerald, about a local (fictional) policeman dealing with crime in Emerald.

Filming of A Country Practice in the fictional town of Wandin Valley was moved to Emerald when the show moved to Network Ten for one series in 1994.

Filming for the ABC children's drama Come Midnight Monday was effected in and around Emerald, Belgrave & Cockatoo, depicting the fictional country town of Widgery.

== Notable people ==
- Vanessa Amorosi (b. 1981), singer-songwriter
- Alison Evans, novelist and writer
- Alfred Gregory (1913–2010), mountaineer, explorer and photographer
- Matthew Lobbe (b. 1989), Australian rules football player
- Kade Simpson (b. 1984), Australian rules football player
- Red Symons (b. 1949), musician and media personality

== See also ==
- Shire of Pakenham – Parts of Emerald were previously within this former local government area.
- Shire of Sherbrooke – Parts of Emerald were previously within this former local government area.
