= Lakeside railway station, Melbourne =

Railway station in Victoria, Australia

Lakeside
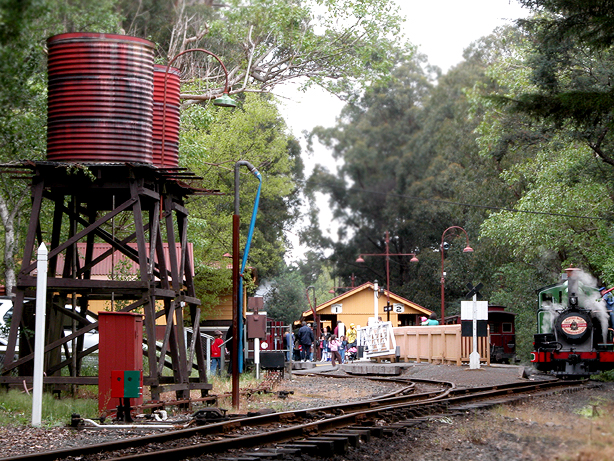
- Down end of the station

General information
- Coordinates: 37°55′48″S 145°27′34″E
- System: Puffing Billy Railway station
- Lines: Puffing Billy Railway; Gembrook railway line (former)
- Distance: 55.12 km (34.25 mi) from Flinders Street
- Platforms: 2
- Tracks: 3

Other information
- Status: Staffed

History
- Opened: 1944
- Closed: 1954
- Rebuilt: 1975

Services
Preceding station	Puffing Billy Railway	Following station
Nobelius towards Belgrave	Gembrook line	Wright towards Gembrook
Location

Lakeside railway station is situated on the Puffing Billy Railway in Melbourne, Australia. It was opened in 1944 to serve Emerald Lake Park, a popular picnic and recreation reserve created during World War II. The station originally consisted of a short single-face platform on the up side of the line, approximately on the site of the current locomotive water tanks. It had a name board and a red flag for intending passengers to signal to the train crew, but no shelter.

Lakeside today is a staff station, with a passing loop, island platform and waiting shelters. A booking office and refreshment room is across the track on what was the post-reopening single-face platform. There is also a second loop siding beyond the former park access road for the single-face third platform which services the Visitor Centre. A short, dead-end spur extends past the down end of this loop siding.

Of interest is a working wig-wag level crossing warning signal, which operates at the former park access road between the platform and storage siding. It is believed to be the only regularly operating wig-wag signal in Victoria.

Australia's biggest model railway, the Emerald Lake Model Railway, is located near the station.

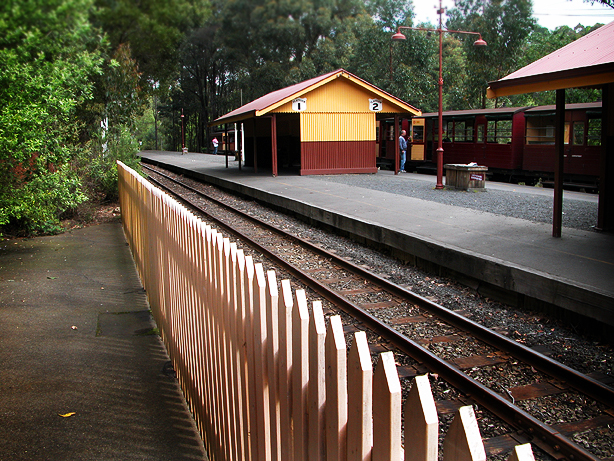
A view of the platform
