= Gembrook railway station =

Railway station in Victoria, Australia

Gembrook
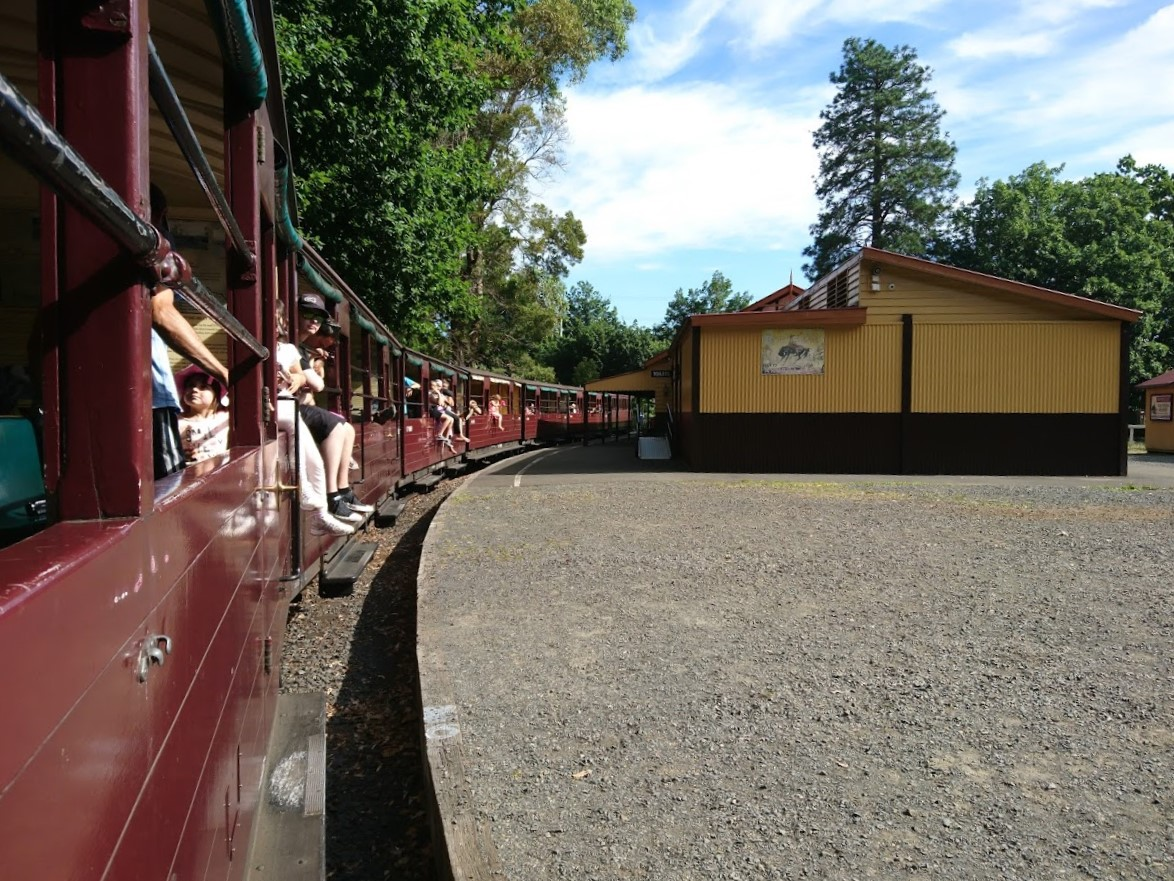
- Southbound view of Gembrook Station

General information
- Coordinates: 37°57′07″S 145°32′57″E
- System: Puffing Billy Railway station
- Lines: Puffing Billy Railway; Gembrook railway line (former)
- Distance: 65.56 km (40.74 mi) from Flinders Street
- Platforms: 2
- Tracks: 3

Other information
- Status: Staffed

Services
| Preceding station | Puffing Billy Railway | Following station |
|---|---|---|
| Fielder towards Belgrave | Gembrook line | Terminus |
Location

Gembrook railway station is located in the township of Gembrook in Victoria, Australia, east of Melbourne. It was opened with the line on 18 December 1900 and closed on 30 April 1954.

The line was rebuilt to the Gembrook terminus in 1998 by the Puffing Billy Railway. Heritage steam trains operated by Puffing Billy now stop at a new "Town" platform located on the site of a former siding. A "heritage" station has also been constructed on the site of the original Gembrook station. It has a layout very similar to that of the station in the 1920s, with only minor alterations to meet modern requirements.
