= Puffing Billy Railway =

Railway in Melbourne, Victoria, Australia

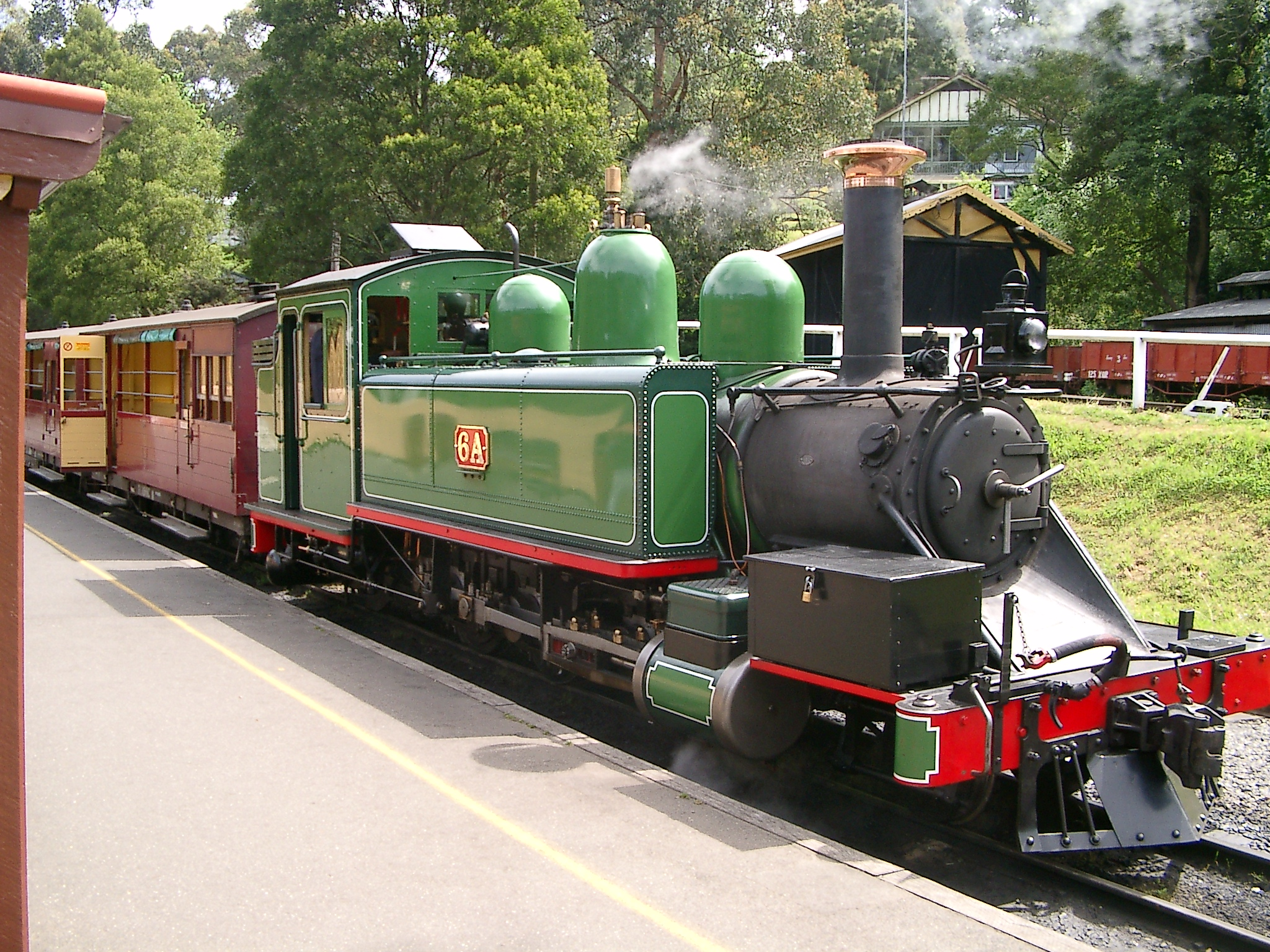
- Victorian Railways NA class 6A at Belgrave station in 2002
- Locale: Dandenong Ranges, Melbourne, Victoria, Australia
- Terminus: Belgrave (Puffing Billy); Gembrook
- Coordinates: 37°54′27″S 145°21′24″E
- Connections: Belgrave line (current); Upper Ferntree Gully line (former)

Commercial operations
- Built by: Victorian Railways
- Original gauge: 2 ft 6 in (762 mm)
- Original rack system: Single track

Preserved operations
- Operated by: Puffing Billy Railway; (3 to 6 services daily, except Christmas Day)
- Stations: 11
- Length: 25.1 km (15.6 mi)
- Preserved gauge: Victorian Railways narrow gauge

Commercial history
- Opened: 1900
- Closed to passengers: 1954 (as VicRail)
- Preserved era: Early 20th century

Preservation history
- 1962: Belgrave to Menzies Creek
- 1965: Belgrave to Emerald
- 1975: Belgrave to Lakeside
- 1998: Belgrave to Gembrook

Website
- puffingbillyrailway.org.au

Puffing Billy Railway (PBR) is a 2 ft 6 in (762 mm) narrow gauge heritage railway in the southern foothills of the Dandenong Ranges in Melbourne, Australia. The railway was one of the five narrow gauge lines of the Victorian Railways which opened around the beginning of the 20th century. Situated near the city of Melbourne it is one of the most popular steam heritage railways in the world, attracting tourists locally and overseas.

Opened in 1900, the railway branched off the broad gauge network at Upper Ferntree Gully, winding its way through the Dandenong Ranges and ending in the township of Gembrook, passing through stops such as Belgrave, Emerald and Cockatoo on the way. Puffing Billy now operates between Belgrave and Gembrook, offering various tourist experiences related to the train and local area. The railway is popularly known for its open air carriages that allow passengers to sit on the side and dangle their legs off the moving train, a tradition that has existed since the introduction of the open air "NBH" carriages in the 1920s.

== History ==
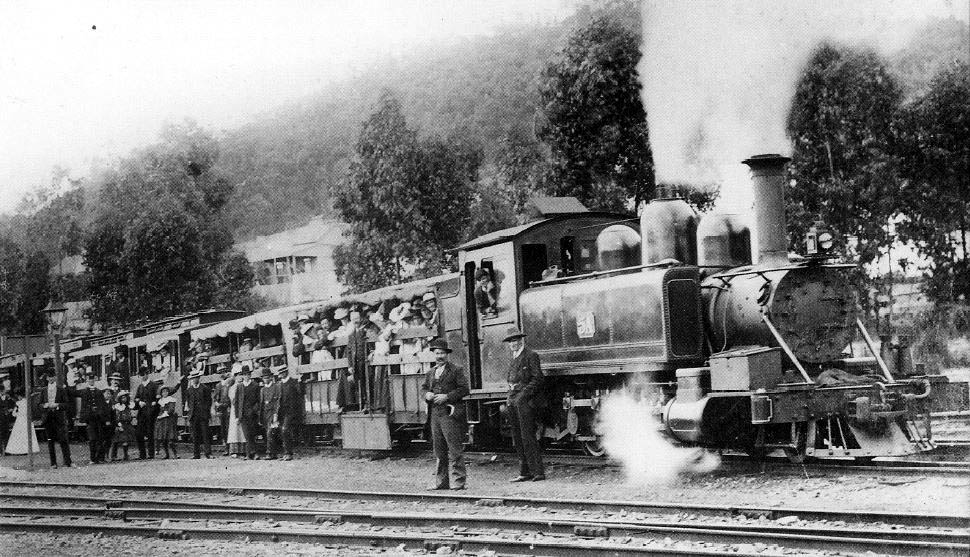
Excursion train about to leave Upper Ferntree Gully c. 1908

The original line was opened in 1900 with the intention of serving timber traffic out of Gembrook as well as local farming produce along the whole route of the line and to serve the Nobelius nursery and orchard. Holiday goers heading to Belgrave also became a massive draw card in the 1920s for passenger traffic. The railway was popular with locals living in the area throughout its operational history as public transport and services never ceased although they reduced with the end of World War II and dwindled in the early 1950s reduced to one train a week and a road motor service. Operations stopped in 1953 after a landslide blocked the line between Selby and Menzies Creek, and it was formally closed in 1954. with the Victorian Railways not deeming the endeavour financially viable to reopen as the railway had not made a single profit since its opening in 1900.

=== Preservation ===
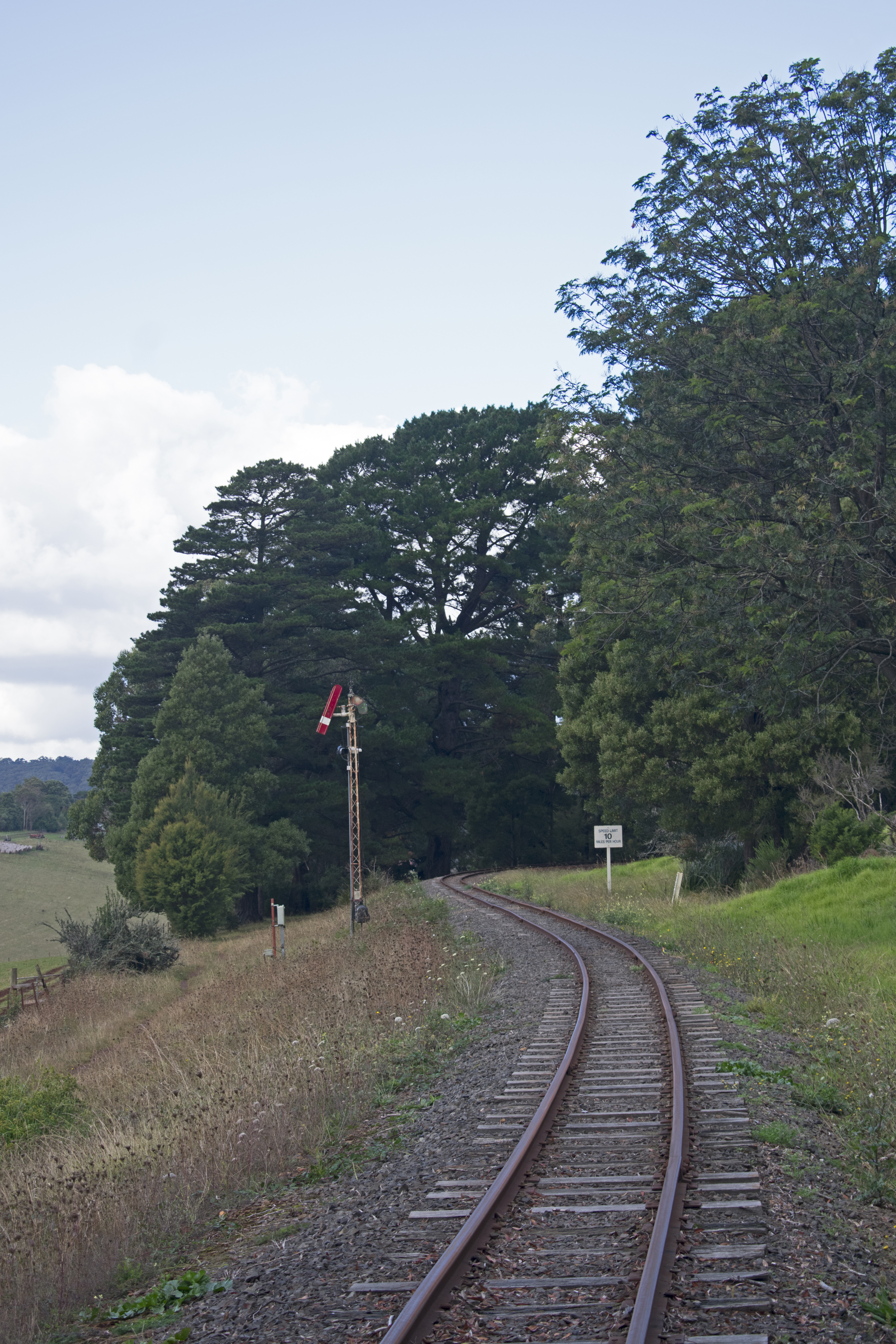
Railway semaphore signal west of Gembrook station

Following closure, a few farewell specials operated on the remaining usable section to Belgrave, and these proved very popular. On 1 October 1955, the Puffing Billy Preservation Society was formed by Harold L. Hewett to keep the railway running indefinitely. The society arranged for Victorian Railways to run the train on weekends and holidays, with the society guaranteeing the government against losses from insufficient ticket sales. Society volunteers took the roles of conductors, selling and checking tickets on the train, and fund-raising. This arrangement continued until the Upper Ferntree Gully to Belgrave section was closed in 1958, when services again ceased for conversion to a broad-gauge, electrified suburban line.

The society immediately started work on restoring the Belgrave to Lakeside section. Rover Scouts attending the 7th World Rover Moot held at Wonga Park assisted in the clearing of the line between Belgrave and Menzies Creek as part of the event's community service component.

On 28 July 1962 trains resumed running between Belgrave and Menzies Creek. When the line reopened, society volunteers took a larger role, manning stations, selling and checking tickets, and doing non-safety-critical maintenance on the train, and track maintenance under the supervision of a qualified, recently retired Victorian Railways track repair expert. As with the weekend and holiday trains in the mid to late 1950s, ticket revenue went into an account on which the railways drew to pay for their staff (primarily the drivers, firemen and guards) involved in running the line.

Operations were extended over the remainder of the original line, opening to Emerald on 31 July 1965 and Lakeside on 18 October 1975 before reaching Gembrook, which was opened on 18 October 1998. The first trains to Gembrook carried children from the primary schools along the Belgrave–Gembrook corridor, two of which directly adjoin the railway and the remainder not more than a street away.

The railway operates daily (except for Christmas Day and adverse weather days) Its infrastructure is restored and recreated to reflect the heyday of the line between 1900 and 1930, and is operated with some of the railway practices from the Victorian Railways of that era, such as using the "staff and ticket" safeworking system. In the 2016/17 financial year, Puffing Billy carried 487,237 passengers, up more than 60,000 from the previous financial year.

== Services and events ==
The railway runs daily (except Christmas day), with a timetable of between three and six services leaving Belgrave for Menzies Creek, Lakeside and/or Gembrook. As of 2025, tickets must be purchased in advance and cannot be purchased on the day. Passengers are required to check in an hour before scheduled departure, and may only travel in specific carriages and on return trips.

As of February 2026, the timetable for Mondays to Thursdays inclusive has 10 am, 11 am, 12:30 pm and 2:15 pm departures from Belgrave to Lakeside, returning 1:20 pm, 3:10 pm, 4:10 pm and 5:10 pm respectively, plus a 10:35 am departure from Belgrave to Menzies Creek which returns at 11:55 am. On Fridays, Saturdays and Sundays trains are extended to Gembrook, so departures from Belgrave are 10 am Lakeside (return 1:20 pm), 10:35 am Menzies Creek (return 12 pm), 11:10 am Lakeside and Gembrook (return 4:50 pm, whether travelling to Lakeside or to Gembrook; passengers may also travel Lakeside-Gembrook return), 12:30 pm Lakeside (return 4:10 pm), and 2:15 pm Lakeside (return 5:30 pm). Special timetables apply for certain event days.

The Lakeside trains give passengers one to two hours at Lakeside (depending on the specific trip), while the Menzies Creek train gives only half an hour there. (Note: Notably, the brief time at Menzies Creek, and inability to mix and match train services, means it may not be practical to use the Railway to visit the Museum.) On Fridays, Saturdays and Sundays the Gembrook train has a 1 hour 50 minute turnaround time, or passengers may choose to spend 2 hours 55 minutes at Lakeside.

Until relatively recently the railway offered dining services on their lunchtime departure from Belgrave and occasional Dinner Train services, though no reference is made to these sorts of services on the Puffing Billy website as of February 2026. Similarly, the "Day out with Thomas" events, "Drive a Steam Train" and other themed events which were advertised as late as 12 January 2020 are now absent.

=== Railway stations ===
The Puffing Billy Railway serves a number of stations along the original route. All stations of the Gembrook railway line from Belgrave to Gembrook have been restored in some form, but trains typically only stop for passengers at the following locations:

==== Belgrave (Puffing Billy) railway station ====
The original Belgrave railway station site was re-used for suburban electric trains from 1962, so a new facility was built for the narrow gauge railway. In the 1980s that was replaced with the current, third station, parallel but slightly east of the 1962 iteration and rebuilt to provide a flat platform area.

Belgrave station is where most passengers start and end their trips. It is accessible by suburban electric trains on the Belgrave line, terminating at Belgrave railway station a few hundred metres to the north with a connecting footpath, or a range of local bus routes including local connections as well as through routes to Oakleigh and Lilydale.. There is also a bus route that more or less follows the preserved railway between Belgrave and Gembrook.

==== Menzies Creek station ====
Menzies Creek railway station opened with the Gembrook line at the end of 1900, as a small intermediate siding. In the preservation era it gained notoriety as the original terminus (from 1962 to 1965), then as an intermediate crossing station allowing trains to pass in opposite directions on what was otherwise a single track railway. It features a wide island platform with a signal box, and is adjacent to the Menzies Creek Steam Museum.

Passengers can only travel to Menzies Creek using a return ticket from Belgrave station.

==== Lakeside station ====
Lakeside railway station was opened as a simple platform for picnickers to the adjacent Emerald Lake Park in 1944, and remained a minor location until the preserved railway was extended from Emerald to Lakeside in 1975. It is now the site of the Lakeside Discovery Centre, and most trains and passengers run between Belgrave and Lakeside.

Passengers may travel from Belgrave to Lakeside and return, or from Lakeside to Gembrook and return.

==== Gembrook station ====
Gembrook railway station marks the end of the original line. The track was restored from Lakeside in 1998, with both a heritage preserved station and a new, modern, station provided, the latter abutting Main Street in the Gembrook town centre. The town station is used for regular tourist train services, though those trains do need to shunt back to the heritage station area to enable reversing for the return trip to Belgrave.

Return tickets are available from either Belgrave or Lakeside to Gembrook.

== Structure ==
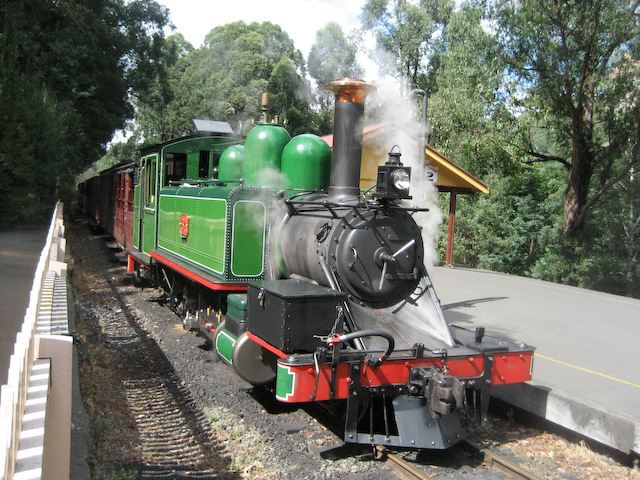
Victorian Railways NA class 6A at Lakeside station

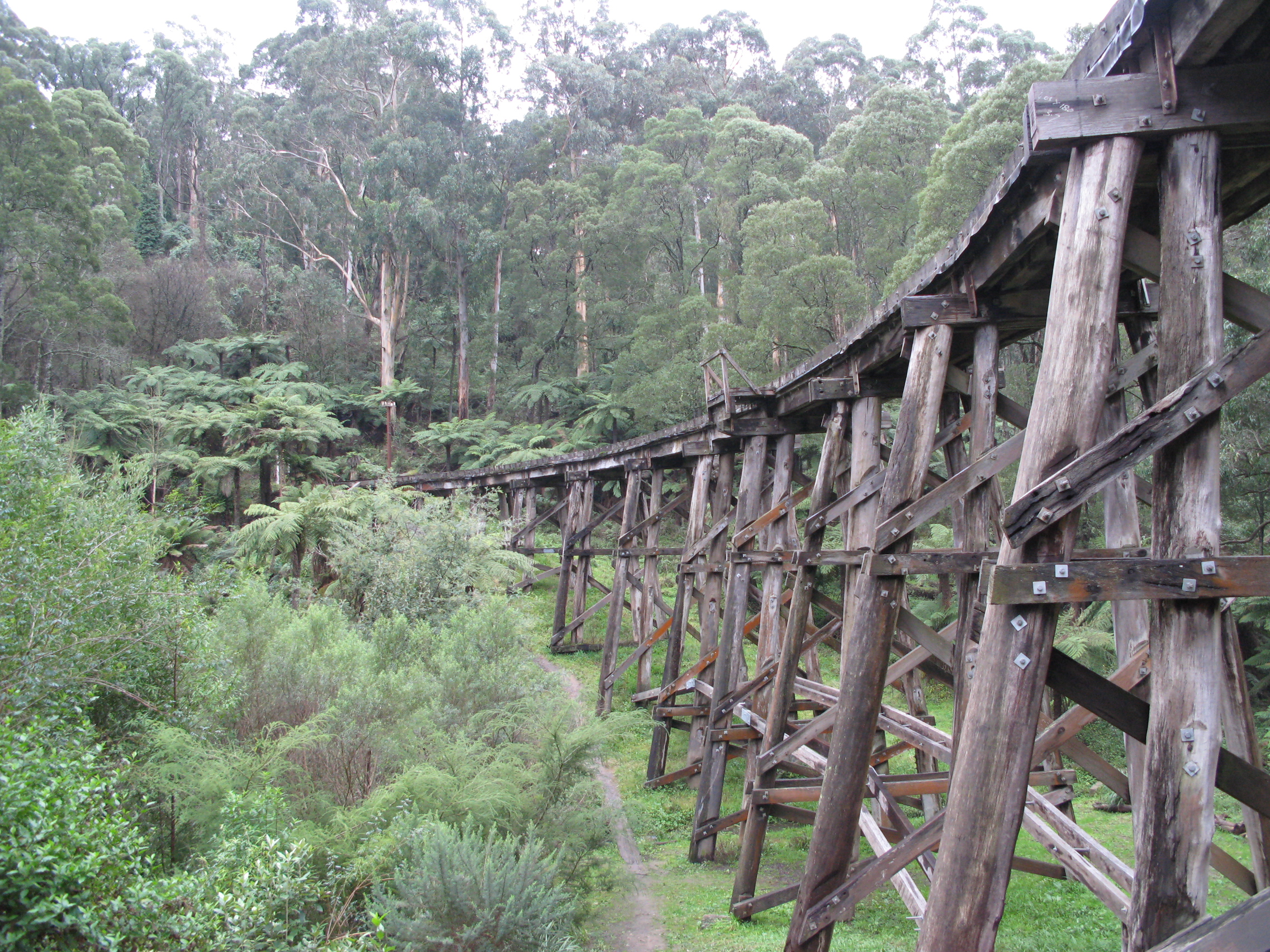
The heritage-listed Monbulk Creek trestle bridge

When the Puffing Billy Preservation Society was formed in 1955, the line was under the control and ownership of the Victorian Railways (V.R.). The society arranged for the V.R. to run the train on weekends and holidays, with the society guaranteeing the V.R. against losses from insufficient ticket sales. Society volunteers took the role of conductors, checking tickets on the train, and fund-raising. That arrangement continued until the Upper Ferntree Gully to Belgrave section of the line was closed in 1958.

When the line reopened in 1962, between Belgrave and Menzies Creek, society volunteers took a larger role, staffing stations, selling and checking tickets, doing non-safety-critical maintenance on the train, and track maintenance under the supervision of a V.R. ganger. Ticket revenue went into an account on which the V.R. drew to pay its staff involved in running the line.

The V. R. was not in the preservation or tourism business, and the arrangement was less than ideal, so the Victorian Government passed the Emerald Tourist Railway Act 1977 (No. 9020), which set up the Emerald Tourist Railway Board (ETRB) as a statutory authority to take over ownership and operation of the railway from the V.R. after 1 October 1977. The act required the board to have between five and ten members, four of whom were to be nominated by the Puffing Billy Preservation Society. The ETRB was defined as the operator of the railway, with the Puffing Billy Preservation Society providing the volunteer support.

In 2022, the Emerald Tourist Railway Act 1977 (No. 9020) was replaced by the Puffing Billy Railway Act 2022 (No. 16 of 2022), principally influenced by the recommendations in the 2018 report by the Victorian Ombudsman on the activities of child sex offender Robert Whitehead at the Puffing Billy Railway and other Victorian heritage railway organisations. The new act replaced the ETRB with the Puffing Billy Railway Board, the role of which was "to operate, manage and maintain the infrastructure and assets of the Puffing Billy Railway".

=== Volunteer roles ===
The roles required to operate the heritage steam railway include signalmen, guards, firemen, engine cleaners, drivers, track patrollers, fire patrollers, safeworkers, station-masters, conductors, booking clerks, refreshment staff, gardeners, maintenance workers, researchers, and administration. Staff also operate across management, finance, human relations (HR), occupational health and safety (OH&S), child safety, workshops, way and works, and operational staff who support the volunteer roles.

All volunteers on the railway were required to register and complete a range of induction processes. The railway relied heavily on the volunteers, who welcomed guests from all parts of the world and were highly trained to supply the operation of the railway.

The railway started with a majority volunteer workforce in the 1950s and 1960s, with only a handful of paid employees seconded from the Victorian Railways. Over time that balance has shifted. As of June 2025, the railway listed 461 total staff, of which there were 327 volunteers and 134 employees; the latter category accounting for 102 full-time equivalent (FTE) positions; that equated to over 200,000 hours per year of employee time. (Note: Calculation was based on 102 FTE, multiplied by 38 hours per week, by 52 weeks per year, assuming an employee works the full 52 weeks and does not take any leave. While the listed 70,000 volunteer hours calculated to an average of approximately four hours per person per week. As of June 2025, volunteers were responsible for approximately a quarter of the worked time associated with the railway.)

In early 2020 the railway advertised that it was operated by "more than 900 dedicated volunteers". By 2023 this had dropped to "over 300" volunteers,,although the latter number seemed to refer to "active volunteers" rather than total numbers. As of February 2026, volunteer roles including the engine cleaner and passenger guide were marked as unavailable, and others previously listed as events team member and workshop team member were removed. The 2025 annual report noted that in the 2024-2025 financial year, "379 active volunteers contributed over 70,000 hours across the year," up from 355 active volunteers but less specific than the 73,013 hours reported the previous year. In 2023, there were 332 volunteers, up from 297 in 2022. The 2020 annual report noted that volunteers were valued at A$4,506,932 for that year.

The 2025 annual report did not mention the Puffing Billy Preservation Society; the report of the previous year listed fifteen organisations, including the preservation society, the Volunteer Representative Group, and the Youth Advisory Group as being represented on the Stakeholder Committee. The 2022 act that created the modern iteration of the Puffing Billy Railway detailed that:

The stakeholder consultative committee must consist of members who represent persons whose interests the Board considers may be affected by the matters referred to in subsection (2), including members who represent the following—

1. the Puffing Billy Preservation Society;
2. community service groups;
3. local heritage groups;
4. volunteers of the Puffing Billy Railway;
5. local trader associations, chambers of commerce and tourism organisations;
6. communities located near land forming part of the Puffing Billy Railway;
7. Councils, within the meaning of the Local Government Act 2020, whose municipal districts include land forming part of the Puffing Billy Railway;
8. schools, within the meaning of the Education and Training Reform Act 2006, that are located near land forming part of the Puffing Billy Railway;
9. children and young people associated with the Puffing Billy Railway.

== Controversies ==
In January 2025, an internal notice was issued forbidding any volunteers and employees from participating in Australia Day celebrations. The notice was published in the Herald-Sun.

=== Child safety and sexual abuse issues ===
In 2014, Robert Whitehead, a long-serving volunteer of various positions and roles on the railway, including serving as the organisation's secretary, was charged and convicted of child sexual offences between 1959 and 2014. He died in 2015 while serving a custodial sentence. Whitehead was convicted and jailed in 1959 for molesting a boy scout, and he returned to his job at the Victorian Railways. He joined the Puffing Billy Railway as a volunteer in 1961, and used his position to meet and molest boys into the 1990s. In 2018, a report by Deborah Glass OBE, the Victorian Ombudsman, found that the board of the Puffing Billy Preservation Society knew about Whitehead's activities and actively protected him. The report revealed decades of negligence in dealing with abuse allegations and led to a public apology from the Victorian Premier Daniel Andrews and other political leaders for the historic failures of the State to protect children. The Ombudsman's report made a number of recommendations all of which were implemented. The Puffing Billy Railway Act (2022) was enacted that reorganised the Emerald Tourist Railway Board into the Puffing Billy Railway Board, as a Victorian government entity with members appointed by the government, and no independent representation for volunteers, that modernised governance of the organisation.

== Locomotives and rolling stock ==
Puffing Billy Locomotives and Rolling Stock

Victorian Heritage Register
- Official name: Puffing Billy Locomotives and Rolling Stock
- Type: Registered object
- Reference no.: H2187
- Category: Transport – Rail

Register of the National Estate
- Official name: Puffing Billy Railway Reserve; Dandenong Ranges National Park and Puffing Billy Railway
- Type: Defunct register
- Designated: undated
- Reference no.: 15248; 105975

Various elements of the Puffing Billy rolling stock were added to the Victorian Heritage Register on an unknown date in recognition of their historical and social significance. The items included are locomotives 3NA, 6NA, and G42; carriages 1NB, 14NB (NB 2nd series), 26 NAC, and 10NBH; vans 2NBC and 5NC; goods vehicle 92NQR; water wagon 149NQ; louvre van 10NU; livestock van 13NM; explosives van 1NH(P); and insulated van 1NT. Various other elements of the railway were also added to non-statutory lists by the Victorian branch of the National Trust on 2 March 1981 and the now defunct Register of the National Estate on an unknown date.

=== Locomotives ===
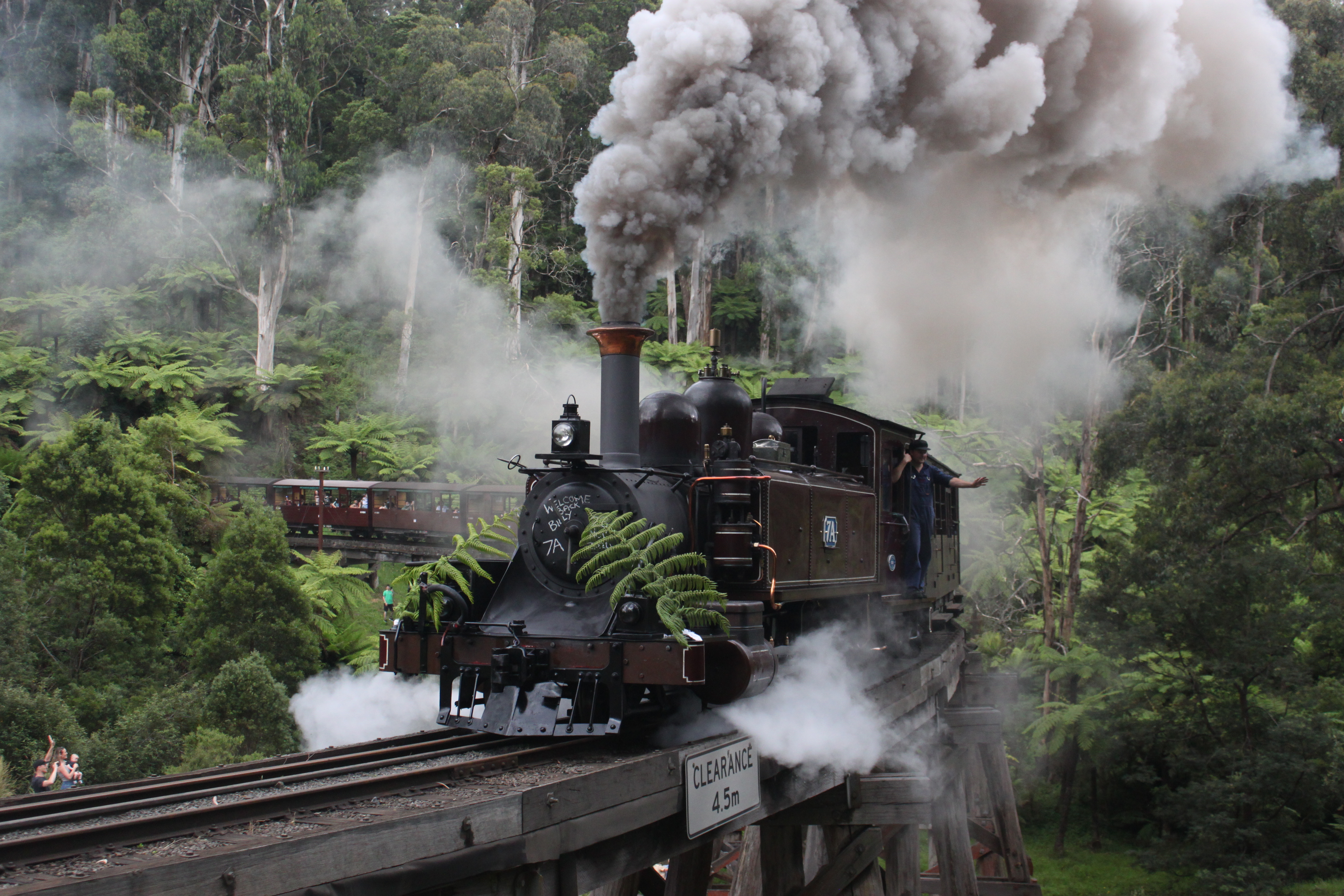
NA7 crossing the heritage-listed Monbulk trestle bridge

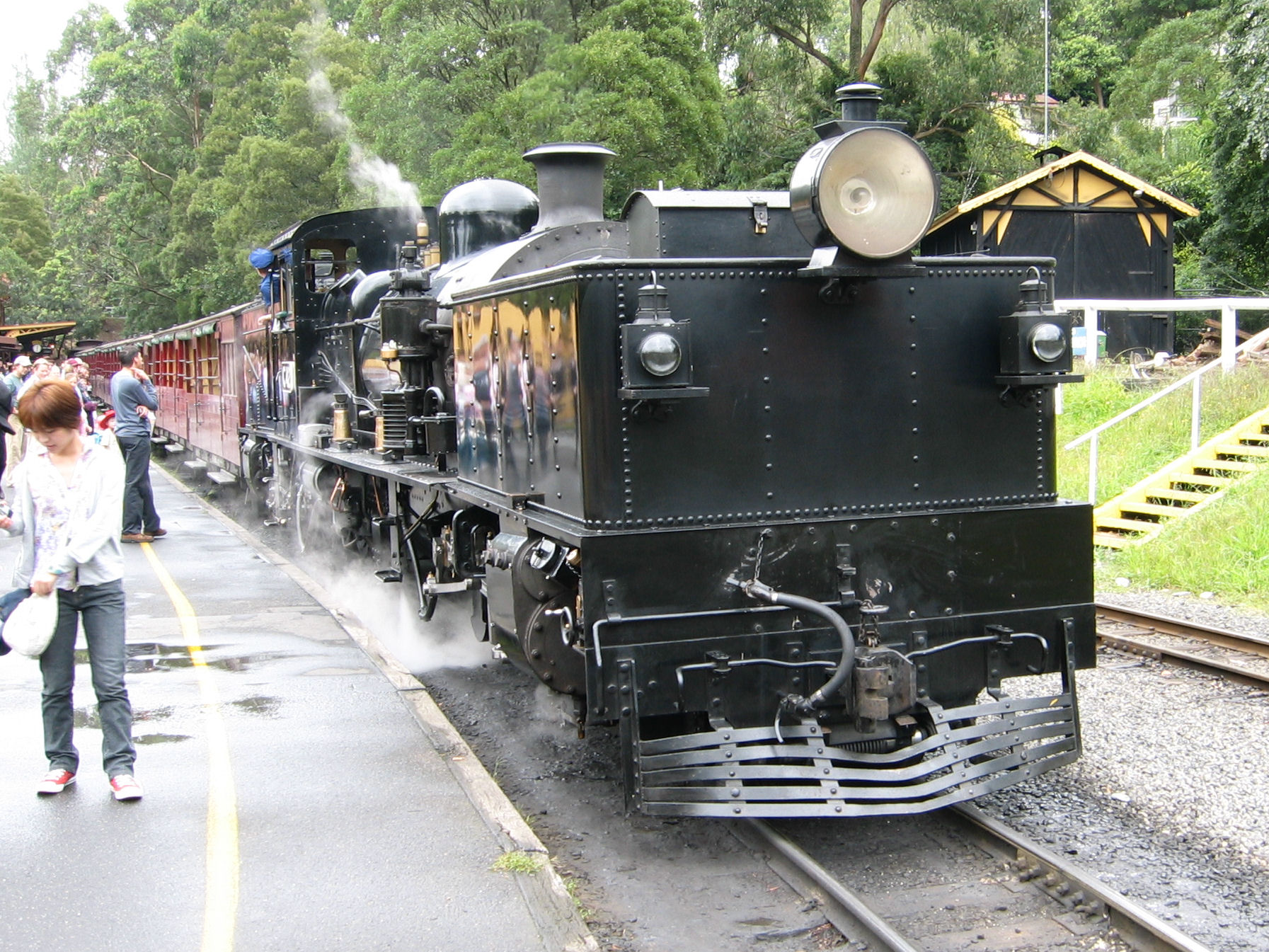
Puffing Billy Garratt G42

The railway owns or controls all the surviving Victorian Railways narrow-gauge locomotives and has restored all but one to operating condition, although not all are running at any one time. This includes 2-6-2 NA class locomotives 3A (unrestored), 6A, 7A, 8A, 12A and 14A, and G class Garratt locomotive G42. Some of these were transferred from the Victorian Railways to the Emerald Tourist Railway Board in October 1977, others were purchased privately or by the Puffing Billy Preservation Society and have since found their way onto the Puffing Billy Railway.

In December 2019 NG G16 Garratt locomotive 129 imported from South Africa entered service. It had been purchased in 1996, and was rebuilt and re-gauged for the Puffing Billy. It complements the operational capabilities of G42. The NA class locomotives are limited to pulling a maximum of 12 carriages, while the Garratts can haul up to 18.

The railway has a number of smaller steam locomotives at museum at Menzies Creek, either on static display or in operating condition. These include a Peckett 0-4-0ST, two Decauvilles (one is a 0-4-0T, and the other a 2-4-2ST) all three originally from the West Melbourne Gasworks, and a Climax geared locomotive from the Tyers Valley Tramway. They occasionally operate special trains and formerly at events such as Thomas the Tank Engine days. The Climax engine was restored for this purpose as it has a large driving cab and is unique in Australia.

The railway operates three diesel locomotives which are used on days of total fire ban, plant or works trains, or when too few steam locomotives are available, including in emergencies. D21 is former Tasmanian Government Railways V class V12, while DH5 and DH59 are ex Queensland Railways DH class. All were regauged and rebuilt for the railway. Diesel Rail Tractor (NRT 1) is mainly used for shunting rolling stock at the carriage workshops.

==== VR Original ====
Image	Number	Type	Builder	Serial number	Year built	Status	Notes
	3A	NA class 2-6-2T	Newport Workshops	9 of 1900	1900	Display; Listed on the VHR	The first of the VR-built NA class locomotives, built at the Victorian Railways Newport Workshops, utilising spare parts supplied with Baldwin-built 1A. Stored disassembled for future restoration. In 2015 it was placed on static display at the Menzies Creek Museum. In June 2020 it was moved to Lakeside for display in the Discovery Centre.
	6A	NA class 2-6-2T	Newport Workshops	11 of 1901	1901	Operational; Listed on the VHR	Was restored as near as practicable to "as new" condition (1901–1906) of two-tone green with white lining, low-height bunker, extended side tanks, etc. It was fitted with a Lempor Exhaust System between 2002 and 2017, now taken out of traffic in March 2019 for a D exam and overhaul and during 2021, is replacing the old boiler tubes for new ones prior to reassembly, and in December 2023, overhaul was complete and it returned to service that same year.
	7A	NA class 2-6-2T	Newport Workshops	34 of 1905	1905	Operational	Was restored as near as practicable to as new condition (1905–1910) of Canadian Pacific red & brown with white lining, low-height bunker, small head lamps, etc.
	8A	NA class 2-6-2T	Newport Workshops	64 of 1908	1908	Operational	Was restored as near as practicable to its 1923–1937 era of all-over black, modified front end with tapered smoke stack, large head lamps, extended bunker, etc.
	12A	NA class 2-6-2T	Newport Workshops	184 of 1912	1912	Operational	Was restored as near as practicable to its 1911–1921 era of Canadian Pacific red & brown with white lining and low-height bunker, however has been given the large-style headlamps rather than the small head lamps, plus a full-width ash chute rather than the narrow ash chute.
	14A	NA class 2-6-2T	Newport Workshops	270 of 1914	1914	Operational	Was restored as near as practicable to its later era (1938–1946) of all-over black, extended bunker, large head lamp, guard irons instead of cow-catchers, etc. It underwent conversion to oil firing during 2017 and testing in early 2018 before full return to service; was converted back to coal-firing in November 2024.
	G42	G class 2-6-0+0-6-2	Beyer, Peacock & Company	6268	1926	Display, pending overhaul; Listed on the VHR	The last remaining G class Garratt locomotive from the Victorian Railways. Purchased from the Victorian Railways in July 1964 by the Puffing Billy Preservation Society. Transferred by rail to Belgrave in January 1968 and arrived at the Menzies Creek Museum on 10 February 1968. The museum also acquired one of the Australian Portland Cement Garratts along with an unused spare boiler. Restored to steam in 2004 as near as practicable to its 1946–1954 era of all-over black with extended cab roof, original style smoke stack, kerosene-style lamps, cow-catcher, mid-height marker lamps, etc. The engine was withdrawn in 2021 for a major overhaul and is on display at the Menzies Creek Museum. It is planned to restore the engine at the Belgrave workshops.

==== Other steam ====
Image	Number	Type	Builder	Serial number	Year built	Status	Notes
	NG/G16	G class 2-6-2+2-6-2	Beyer, Peacock & Company	7430	1951	Operational	South African Railways 2 ft (610 mm) gauge NG/G16 Garratt locomotive, imported to Australia in 1996. Rebuilt and re-gauged to 2 ft 6 in (762 mm) gauge as a backup for G 42. Entered service in December 2019.
	1694	Climax, Two-truck	Climax Locomotive Works	1694	1928	Operational	Climax geared steam locomotive, the last built and the only one ever built to 2 ft 6 in (762 mm) gauge. Purchased by the Forests Commission Victoria and used on the Tyers Valley Tramway to haul timber trains until 1949. After decommissioning the locomotive in the 1950s it was stored (abandoned) at the State Sawmill site at Erica until it was transferred to Puffing Billy's museum for static display in 1965. Restored to steam by the PBR in the 1980s. A major overhaul was completed in September 2013 and it returned to service.
	861 Decauville	2-4-2ST	Couillet for Decauville		1886	Stored, pending overhaul	Previously owned by Melbourne Metropolitan Gas Company for use at the West Melbourne Gasworks. Extensively rebuilt in the 1970s as part of an attempt to restore a section of the Walhalla railway line. Privately owned and leased to the PBR. Previously used on Footplate Experience Trains, making use of the larger cabin compared to its sibling engines. 861 is on display in Menzies Creek Museum pending a boiler inspection.
	986 Carbon	0-4-0T	Couillet for Decauville		1890	Stored, pending overhaul	Previously owned by Melbourne Metropolitan Gas Company for use at the West Melbourne Gasworks. Briefly at Walhalla, Victoria in attempt to restore railway in early 1960s. Used at a park in Frankston in the 1970s. Privately owned and leased to the PBR. New Boiler fitted in 2013 and due to return to traffic once final works have been completed.
	Peckett 1711 "Sir John Grice"	0-4-0ST	Peckett & Sons	1711	1926	Stored, pending overhaul	Previously owned by Melbourne Metropolitan Gas Company for use at the West Melbourne Gasworks. Was stored but not used at the Frankston Whistle Stop Amusement Park, purchased by the Puffing Billy Preservation Society in October 1974 and restored to service by volunteers, first operating in December 1981. Often used at PBR decorated for Thomas the Tank Engine events; previously hauling trains but now static with a smoke generator provided. It also ran in an alternate guise as Peter Peckett from 1991 to 1999.
	127	NG G16; 2-6-2+2-6-2	Beyer, Peacock & Company			Display	South African Railways 2 ft (610 mm) NG G16 Garratt locomotive previously used on the Banana Express, imported to Australia in 2012. On display in the Menzies Creek Museum; also a source of spare parts for sister locomotive 129 and for possible future rebuild and regauging to 2 ft 6 in (762 mm) gauge as a second backup for G 42.
	14 Shay	Shay; Two-truck	Lima Locomotive Works		1912	Display	Shay geared locomotive formerly used on the Alishan Forest Railway in Taiwan, gifted by Taiwan Government in 1972. On display in the Menzies Creek Museum.
	3 Sub Nigel	0-6-0WT	Orenstein & Koppel	12331	1931	Display	Formerly used by the Sub Nigel Gold Mining Company in South Africa. On display in the Menzies Creek Museum.
	1 "Delta"	0-6-2T	Perry Engineering	7967.50.4	1950	Display	Ex-Qunaba Mill
	4	0-4-2ST	Hudswell Clarke	1559	1925	Display, pending overhaul	Ex-Pleystowe Mill
	9	0-6-0	Hudswell Clarke	1863	1952	Display	Ex-Macknade Mill

=== Carriages, goods vehicles and brake vans ===
The mainstay of the carriage fleet are the 15 NBH open-sided carriages built specially for tourist traffic on the Gembrook line by the V.R. between 1918 and 1919, and a further 23 vehicles built to the same or similar designs in the preservation era. However, there are also a number of enclosed carriages, both saloon and compartment cars. In addition, four carriages were obtained from the Mount Lyell railway line in Tasmania after its closure in 1963, and regauged and reclassified for Puffing Billy use, numbered 1 to 4 NBL. They are named Mt Lyell, Rinadeena, Teepookana and Dubbil Barril respectively, reflecting their Tasmanian heritage. During the 1980s and 1990s they were all upgraded to first class carriages, recoded 1 to 4 NAL, and are now primarily used on the Luncheon train and Dinner trains.

Several carriages were temporarily converted to include a guard's compartment. A number of NQR low-sided goods trucks have also been modified for passenger use, making them similar to the NBH carriages. Another three NQR trucks have been fitted with seats but no roof and are only used during the summer peak season.

Representatives of all classes of goods vehicles and brake vans (including combined brake van and passenger carriages) used on the narrow gauge lines of the Victorian Railways are to be found on the Puffing Billy line, and are used for works trains, storage, and occasional heritage trains recreating the look of trains in the 1920s.

Image	Number	Year built	Builder	Status	Notes
	NB			Operational; Listed on the VHR	

== In popular culture ==
Solo One was a TV police drama series produced by Crawford Productions that screened in 1976, filmed and set in Emerald, Victoria, about a local (fictional) policeman dealing with crime in the town, however it was aimed at a younger audience than most Australian TV police dramas. It featured Puffing Billy in the opening credits scene as well as being part of most story-lines.

The ABC children's drama Come Midnight Monday was filmed in and around Belgrave, Emerald & Cockatoo and featuring Puffing Billy locomotive 12A—renamed "Wombat"—as the main character.

Filming of A Country Practice in the fictional town of Wandin Valley (the towns of Wandin, Wandin North and Wandin East are however 30 km north of Emerald) was moved to Emerald when the show moved to Network 10, and occasionally featured Puffing Billy.

The 1966 television special The Seekers at Home filmed a segment at Puffing Billy, where The Seekers sing "Morningtown Ride" to a group of children.

Filming of Round the Twist was in and around Belgrave to Lakeside.

In 1997, the soap opera Neighbours filmed scenes set on and around the train. The characters of Darren Stark and Libby Kennedy lost young Louise Carpenter and chased after the train en route to Belgrave on a motorbike to catch up with her after discovering she had boarded it.

== See also ==
- Monbulk Creek Rail Bridge
- List of places on the Victorian Heritage Register in the Shire of Yarra Ranges
