= Belgrave (Puffing Billy) railway station =

Railway station in Belgrave, Victoria, Australia

Belgrave
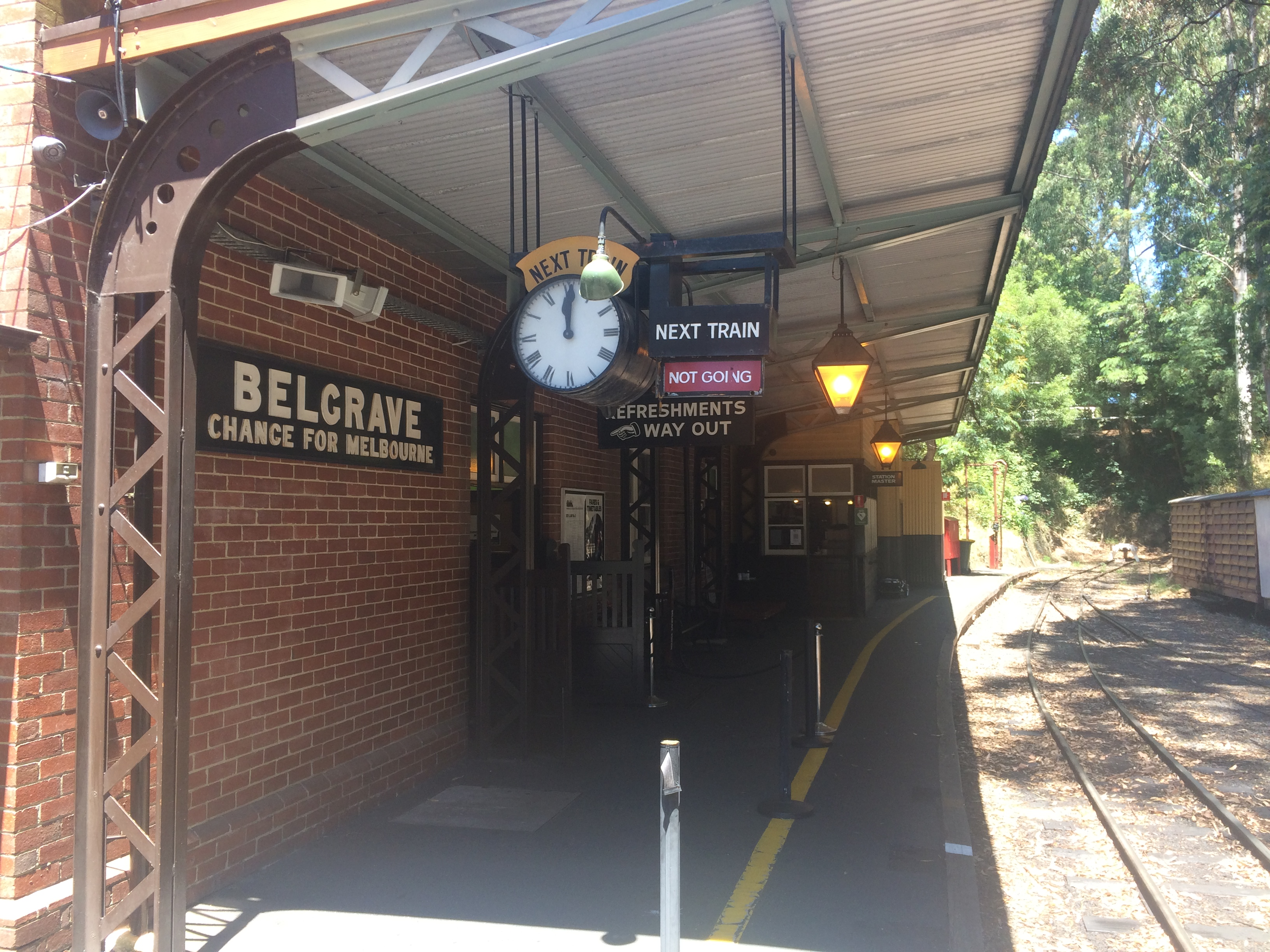
- Belgrave station & platform, January 2022.

General information
- Location: 1 Old Monbulk Road, Belgrave, Victoria 3160; Shire of Yarra Ranges; Australia
- Coordinates: 37.90762°S 145.35633°E
- System: Puffing Billy Railway station
- Lines: Puffing Billy Railway; Gembrook railway line (former)
- Distance: 41.84 km (26.00 mi) from Flinders Street
- Platforms: 1
- Tracks: 5
- Connections: Bus 693; Belgrave line

Construction
- Structure type: Ground
- Parking: No

Other information
- Status: Operational, staffed
- Website: www.puffingbilly.com.au

Services
Preceding station	Puffing Billy Railway	Following station
Terminus	Gembrook line	Selby towards Gembrook
Preceding station	Metro Trains	Following station
Tecoma towards Flinders Street	Belgrave line transfer at Belgrave	Terminus
Location

Belgrave (Puffing Billy) railway station is situated at the edge of Belgrave, a suburb of Melbourne in the Australian state of Victoria. It is the inner terminal of the famous Puffing Billy heritage steam railway.

This station is adjacent to the Belgrave suburban railway station, which is the outer terminal of the Belgrave line of Melbourne's broad gauge (5 ft 3in) electric suburban network. The suburban station is accessible via a short footpath. Before this station was built, the original narrow gauge line ran from the original site of the narrow-gauge station (approximately where the existing Metro station car park is) to Selby station.

== History ==
The original Belgrave narrow gauge station closed in 1958 and was replaced by the broad gauge, suburban, electric railway station in early 1962. A few months later a new narrow gauge station was established on the former mainline just north of the original site, for the Puffing Billy Railway. The new station was situated on a steep, 1-in-40 downhill gradient towards Menzies Creek, and defined as being at chainage 25 miles 60 chains from Melb–ourne, with Train Staff and Ticket working provided on the restored line between Belgrave and Menzies Creek; the safeworking token was aspirationally labelled Belgrave Lakeside. The original yard provided by the Victorian Railways did not have sufficient capacity for all the narrow gauge rolling stock, and locomotive maintenance was carried out in Melbourne with transfer trains operating as required. Unusually, of the three tracks provided, the outer two tracks were for operational use and the middle track was the stabling siding. A fourth siding on the west side was provided with an engine shed and coal stage.

In 1964 a rodded derail and point indicator was provided at the down end of the main platform track, as a safety measure to reduce the risk of run-away trains escaping the Belgrave yard. An Up home signal was provided in 1966.

In 1973 a derail and pilot quadrant lever were added, and Belgrave East Loop was established beyond the Old Monbulk Road level crossing. This loop siding was secured by Annett's key at the Up end and by Staff lock at the Down end. A down departure home signal, worked by an arrangement of quadrant levers, was provided on the platform. The derail facility on the platform track was converted to lever operation in 1975.

== ETRB era ==
The station and line were transferred from the Victorian Railways to the Emerald Tourist Railway Board as at 1 October 1977. This severance required provision of a new locomotive depot, so a new brick engine shed was built close to the Old Monbulk Road level crossing. By this time a separate shed had also been built to house the "VIP car" 1NBL. The ETRB purchased adjoining land shortly thereafter, allowing design of a new station to be undertaken to resolve the steep gradient issue.

The platform track was abolished and its supporting embankment cut back, with trains temporarily using a platform at Belgrave East Loop. New tracks were provided for the low-level station, with falling gradients of 1-in-200 towards the middle of the platform for safety, and the original yard was retained as carriage stabling. A new locomotive shed and a new trolley shed were provided, and coaling is now done by front-end loader instead of from a coal stage.

This new station is the present day headquarters of the Puffing Billy Railway.

=== 2003 shed extension ===
In 2003 the brick locomotive shed was extended west with a taller, steel facility, with the access yard throat compressed into a smaller space. The maintenance trolleys were moved to what had previously been the NBL/Climax shed, and their prior facility replaced by crew rooms.

== Gallery ==
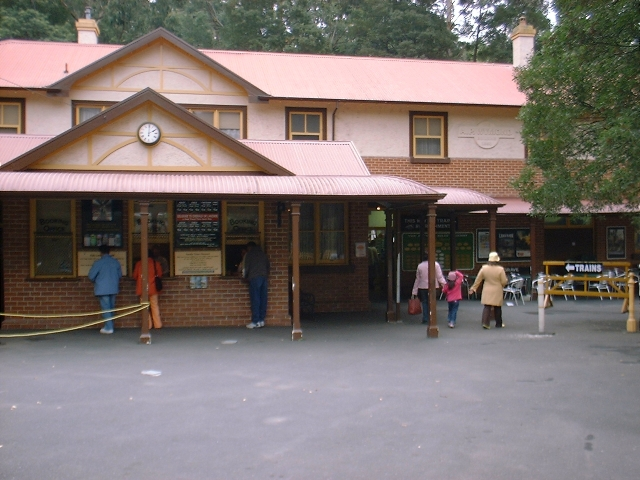
The entrance and booking windows of Belgrave Station

== See also ==
- Puffing Billy Railway
