= Belgrave railway station =

Railway station in Melbourne, Victoria, Australia

Belgrave
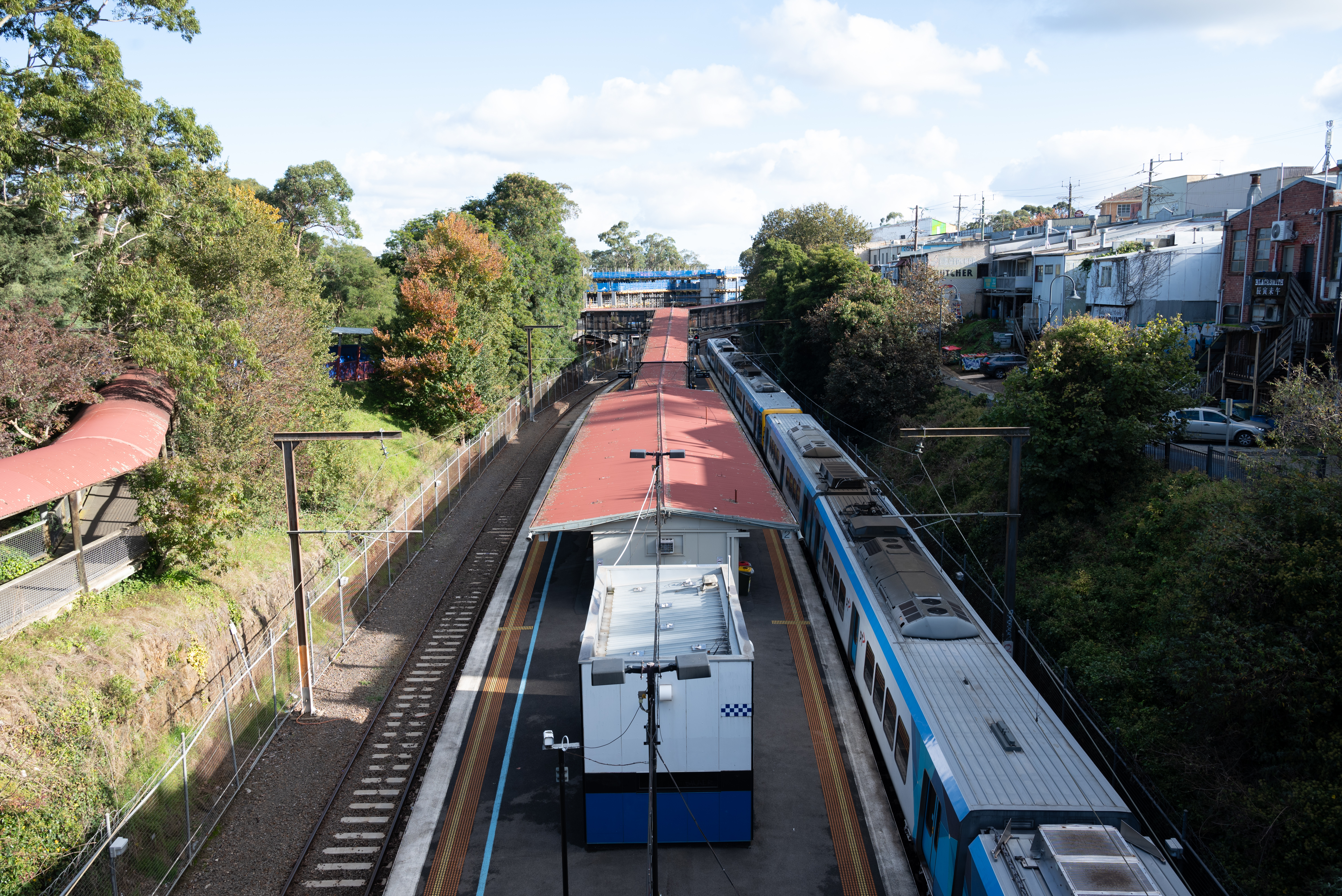
- Westbound view with an X'Trapolis at Platform 2 viewed from Belgrave-Gembrook Road, May 2023

General information
- Location: Belgrave-Gembrook Road, Belgrave, Victoria 3160; Shire of Yarra Ranges; Australia
- Coordinates: 37°54′33″S 145°21′19″E
- System: PTV commuter rail station
- Owner: VicTrack
- Operator: Metro Trains
- Lines: Belgrave; Gembrook (former)
- Distance: 42.69 kilometres from Southern Cross
- Platforms: 2 (island)
- Tracks: 2
- Connections: Bus; Puffing Billy

Construction
- Structure type: Ground
- Parking: 640
- Cycle facilities: 26
- Accessible: No—steep ramp

Other information
- Status: Operational, premium station
- Station code: BEG
- Fare zone: Myki zone 2
- Website: Public Transport Victoria

History
- Opened: 18 December 1900; 125 years ago
- Rebuilt: 19 February 1962; 64 years ago
- Electrified: February 1962 (1500 V DC overhead)
- Former names: Monbulk (1900-1904)

Passengers
- 2005–2006: 449,958
- 2006–2007: 477,173 ▲6.04%
- 2007–2008: 544,144 ▲14.03%
- 2008–2009: 583,975 ▲7.31%
- 2009–2010: 515,925 ▼11.65%
- 2010–2011: 503,393 ▼2.42%
- 2011–2012: 504,070 ▲0.13%
- 2012–2013: Not measured
- 2013–2014: 356,527 ▼29.27%
- 2014–2015: 357,995 ▲0.41%
- 2015–2016: 394,485 ▲10.19%
- 2016–2017: 312,160 ▼20.86%
- 2017–2018: 394,701 ▲26.44%
- 2018–2019: 389,750 ▼1.25%
- 2019–2020: 296,550 ▼23.91%
- 2020–2021: 143,400 ▼51.64%
- 2021–2022: 152,800 ▲6.55%
- 2022–2023: 197,600 ▲29.31%
- 2023–2024: 223,050 ▲12.88%
- 2024–2025: 283,100 ▲26.92%

Services
Preceding station	Metro Trains	Following station
Tecoma towards Flinders Street	Belgrave line	Terminus
Tecoma towards Ringwood	Belgrave line Shuttle service	Terminus
Preceding station	Heritage Railways	Following station
Terminus	Gembrook line	Selby towards Gembrook
Former services
Preceding station	VicRail	Following station
Tecoma towards Upper Ferntree Gully	Gembrook line	Selby towards Gembrook
List of closed railway stations in Melbourne
Track layout
Location

Belgrave station is a railway station operated by Metro Trains Melbourne and the terminus of the Belgrave line, part of the Melbourne rail network. It serves the eastern Melbourne suburb of Belgrave in Victoria, Australia. Belgrave is a ground level premium station, featuring an island platform with two faces. It opened on 18 December 1900, with the current terminus station provided in 1962.

== History ==
=== Narrow gauge station ===
Belgrave station originally opened on 18 December 1900 as Monbulk, and was renamed Belgrave on 21 November 1904. The station was on the Upper Ferntree Gully – Gembrook narrow gauge line, and was located approximately where the modern station car park is situated.

The station was originally unstaffed. It had a Caretaker provided from the middle of 1912 to the middle of 1919, then a Station Master through to October 1930, at which point the position reverted to Caretaker until closure of the line.

The station opened as a single platform track and a loop siding for goods trains, including a goods shed on the west side. A 3 ft (914 mm) horse-powered timber tramway ran from the west side of the yard, up to road level then across the bridge at the north end of the station, then followed Monbulk Creek until it passed under the railway at Bridge No.5 (the now famous curved trestle bridge of the Puffing Billy Railway) with a junction beyond that point to serve two timber mills each about 2 miles (3.2 km) from Belgrave. As of 1997m the tramway was believed to have remained in operation until the late 1920s.

In 1907 the Ordinary Train Staff and Ticket working on the line was supplemented with Single Line Block instruments that allowed Belgrave to switch in or out of the section for holiday traffic, and in 1910 Home signals were provided at each end of the station, ordinarily crossed out of use but available when additional services operated. In 1909 access to the loop siding was locked at each end and required use of an Annett's key secured to the Train Staff. A middle track, No.2 road, was provided by 3 February 1913. This track was formally considered a crossing loop by the end of the year, with provision of alternate Train Staff sections administered by Upper Ferntree Gully as required. The use of Belgrave as a crossing loop was a regular part of the Saturday timetable from September 1915, though in late 1919 a Staff Exchange Box was provided and the Annett Locks at either end of the yard were replaced with Staff Locks to simplify operation.

In 1921 the line from Upper Fern Tree Gully to Belgrave was converted to Automatic and Track Control safe-working, based on Absolute Permissive Block (APB) as used in North America. This system worked on a first-come, first-serve basis from either end with provision for trains to pass in opposite directions at Upwey. Manual safe-working remained towards Gembrook, and both directions maintained the Single Line Block overlay. In 1927 Train Section Order working replaced the Train Staff and Ticket to Gembrook, as well as the Single Line Block in both directions; Belgrave was then considered a "Crossing and Control Station", allowing proceed orders to be issued.

Both the automatic signals and Train Section Order system were withdrawn and the safeworking system reverted to Train Staff and Ticket from 28 August 1930.

Following a landslide between Selby and Menzies Creek in the previous year, on 30 April 1954, the station closed, along with the rest of the line. From 9 April 1955 until 23 February 1958, the Victorian Railways resumed operations between Upper Ferntree Gully and Belgrave, which was provided under a guarantee against losses by a citizens committee.

On 21 July 1962, a new station for the narrow gauge line was provided, along with the re-opening of the line as far as Menzies Creek as the Puffing Billy Railway. The Belgrave narrow gauge station is approximately 100 metres north of the metropolitan broad gauge station, and serves as the starting point for the Puffing Billy Railway. A short footpath under Belgrave-Gembrook Rd provides a pedestrian connection between the two stations.

=== Broad gauge station ===
Belgrave station opened in its current configuration on 19 February 1962, after the line from Upper Ferntree Gully had been converted to broad gauge and electrified. The rebuilt station is located slightly further down the line than the original narrow gauge station. On opening a stationmaster was immediately provided, and the line from Upper Ferntree Gully opened using Train Staff and Ticket working with plunger locking and a home signal, with co-acting signal nearby, to provide entry to the station. This arrangement remained until the new signalling from Upper Ferntree Gully could be brought into use. In March 1964 this came to pass, with Automatic and Track Control worked by a control panel situated in the Upper Ferntree Gully station building, working the points and signals at Belgrave. The scotch block that previously secured a stabled train in Siding A south of the station was replaced with a motorised catch point at this time.

In 1967 the island platform and the stabling siding were extended for eight-car suburban trains. In 1985 a repeating light was provided for departure signal 58, visible to the train guard.

In the early hours of 23 November 1989, Hitachi carriage 219M was destroyed in an arson attack whilst stabled at the station.

On 2 July 1996, Belgrave was upgraded to a premium station.

In 2018, the Victorian Government announced it would fund the construction of a multi-deck car park at the station, along with better pedestrian access and an improved bus interchange. Construction on the new four-storey, 670-space station began in March 2022, and was completed in January 2024. The new car park provides an additional 470 spaces, taking capacity from 170 to 670. This includes 16 accessible spaces, and 6 charging spaces for electric vehicles.

Belgrave Station also provides a Parkiteer bicycle parking cage for up to 26 bicycles, in addition to casual open-air bicycle parking hoops.

During the 2018/2019 financial year, the station had a patronage of 389,750.

== Platforms and services ==
Belgrave has one island platform with two faces. It is served by Belgrave line trains.

Belgrave platform arrangement
Platform	Line	Destination	Via	Service Type	Notes	Source
1	Belgrave line	Flinders Street	City Loop	All stations and limited express services	See City Loop for operating patterns	
1	Belgrave line	Ringwood		All stations	Shuttle service: Operates after 7pm + before 10am on weekends. Alternates with Flinders Street services.	
2	Belgrave line	Flinders Street	City Loop	All stations and limited express services	See City Loop for operating patterns	
2	Belgrave line	Ringwood		All stations	Shuttle service: Operates after 7pm + before 10am on weekends. Alternates with Flinders Street services.	

== Transport links ==
Ventura Bus Lines operates six bus routes to and from Belgrave station, under contract to Public Transport Victoria:

- 663 : to Lilydale station
- 693 : to Oakleigh station
- 694 : to Olinda (off-peak only)
- 695 : to Gembrook
- 697 : to Belgrave South
- 699 : to Upwey station

== Gallery ==
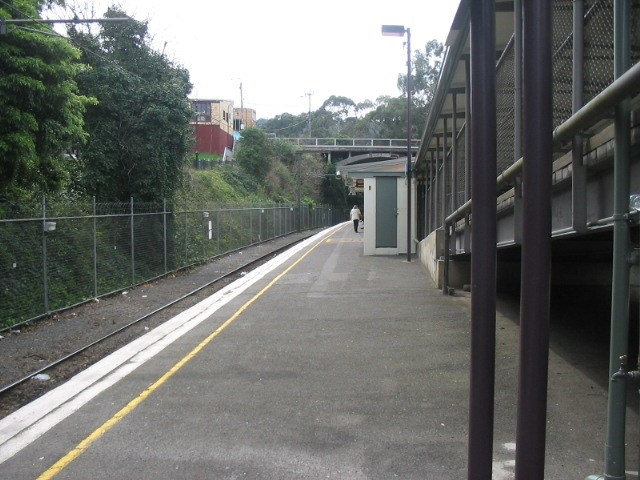
Eastbound view from Platform 2, October 2005

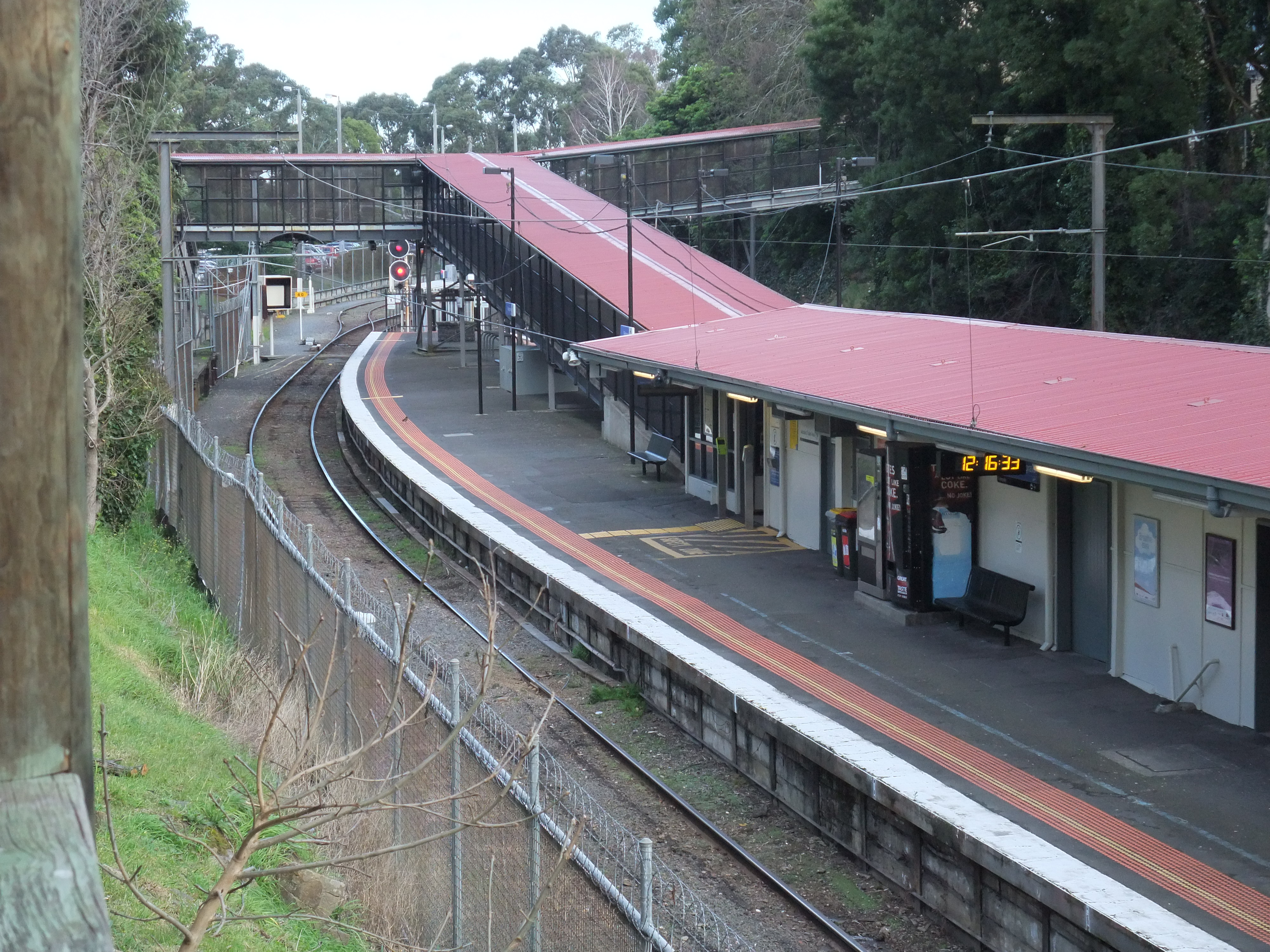
Westbound view of Platform 1 and the station building, July 2014

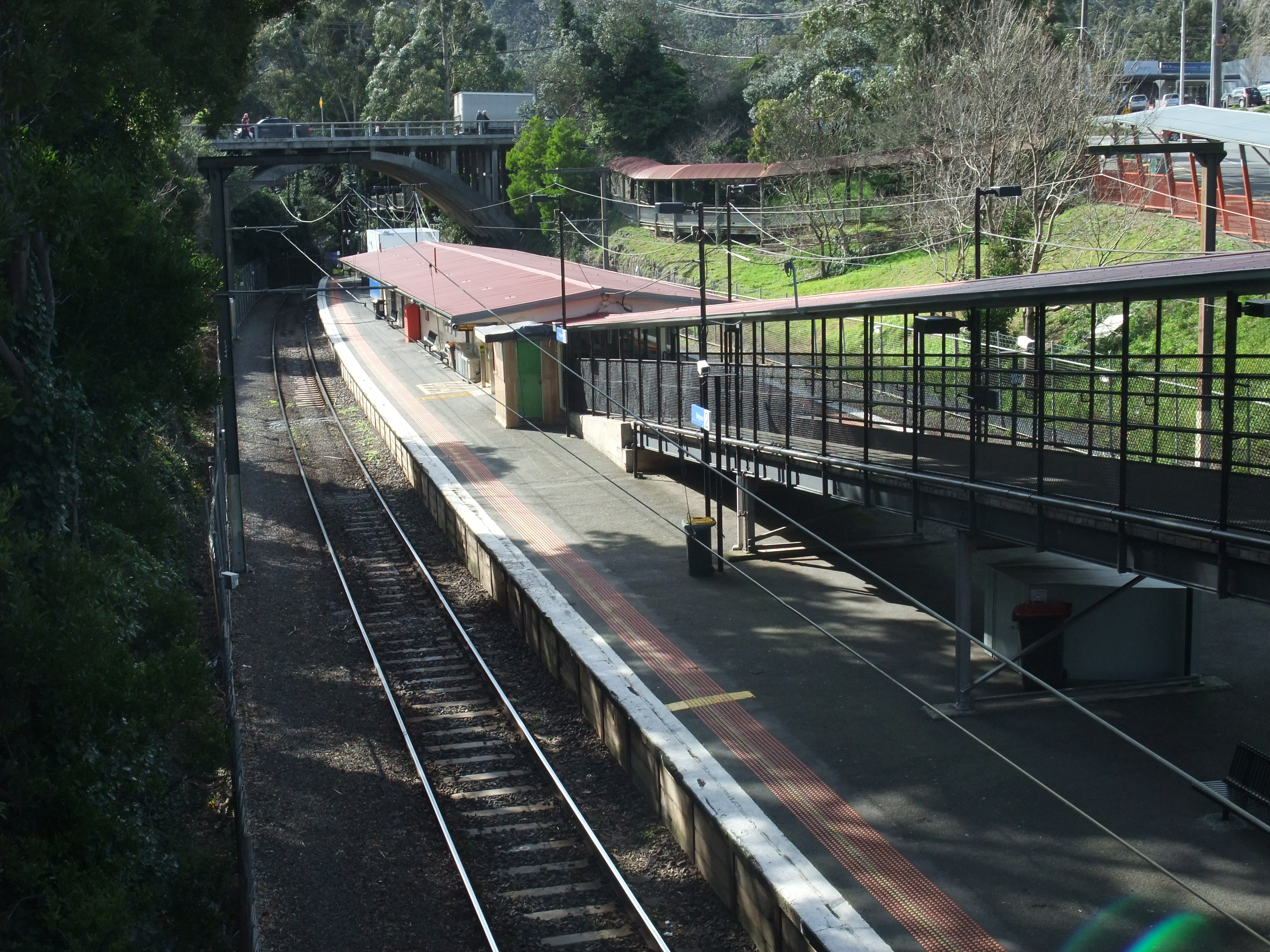
Eastbound view of Platform 1 and the station building, July 2014
