= Gembrook railway line =

Railway in Melbourne, Victoria, Australia

Coordinates: 37°54′27″S 145°21′24″E

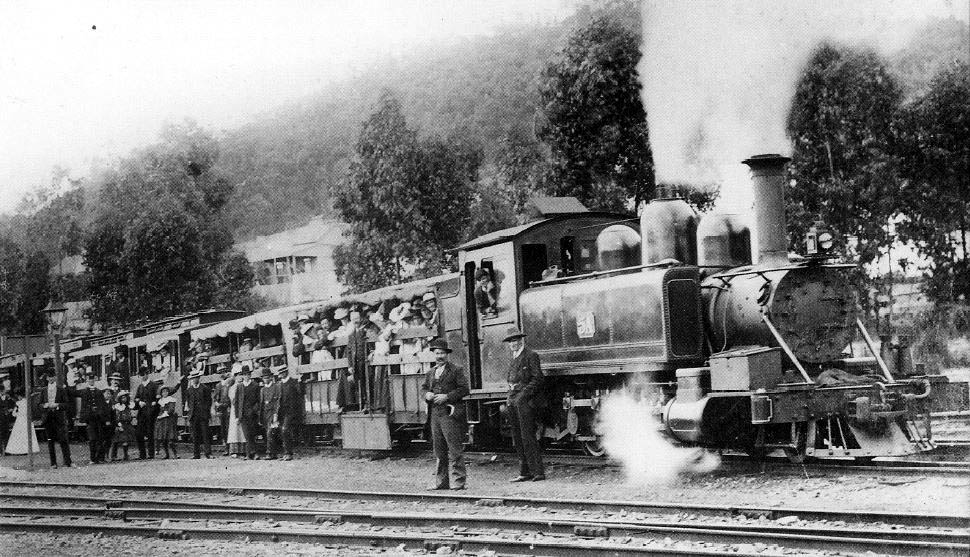
- Victorian Railways NA class 5A with excursion train about to leave Upper Ferntree Gully c. 1908

Overview
- Locale: Melbourne, Victoria, Australia
- Termini: Belgrave (Puffing Billy); Gembrook
- Connecting lines: Belgrave line
- Former connections: Upper Ferntree Gully line
- Stations: 16

Service
- Rolling stock: Victorian Railways narrow gauge

History
- Work began: 1899
- Opened: 1900
- Completed: 1900
- Closed: 1954
- Reopened: from 1962 in stages

Technical
- Line length: 43 km (27 mi)
- Num of tracks: Single track
- Track gauge: 2 ft 6 in (762 mm)
- Operating speed: 32 km/h (20 mph)

The Gembrook railway line was a 2 ft 6 in (762 mm) narrow gauge railway located in the southern foothills of the Dandenong Ranges in Melbourne, Australia. The line was the second of four steam-operated narrow gauge lines of the Victorian Railways which opened around the beginning of the 20th century. was built as a narrow gauge. Opened in 1900, the 18-mile (29 km) line connected to the broad gauge network at Upper Ferntree Gully railway station, Melbourne, winding its way through the Dandenong Ranges and ending in the township of Gembrook, passing through stops such as Belgrave, Emerald and Cockatoo on the way.

After closure by the Victorian Railways a swell of enthusiasts and activism resulted in part of the line being reopened from Upper Ferntree Gully to Belgrave, and when that section of line was converted to broad gauge, restoration of the original narrow gauge route from Belgrave first to Menzies Creek in 1962, then Emerald in 1965, Lakeside in 1975 and finally Gembrook in 1998. Situated near the city of Melbourne, the Puffing Billy Railway is one of the most popular steam heritage railways in the world, attracting tourists locally and overseas.

== History ==
The original line was opened in 1900 with the intention of serving timber traffic out of Gembrook as well as local farming produce along the whole route of the line and to serve the Nobelius nursery & orchard. Holiday goers heading to Belgrave also became a massive draw card in the 1920s for passenger traffic. The railway was popular with locals living in the area throughout its operational history as public transport and services never ceased although they reduced with the end of world war 2 and dwindled in the early 1950s reduced to 1 train a week and a road motor service. Operations stopped in 1953 after a landslide blocked the line between Selby and Menzies Creek, and it was formally closed in 1954. with the Victorian Railways not deeming the endeavour financially viable to reopen as the railway had not made a single profit since its opening in 1900.

== Route ==
=== Stations and sidings ===
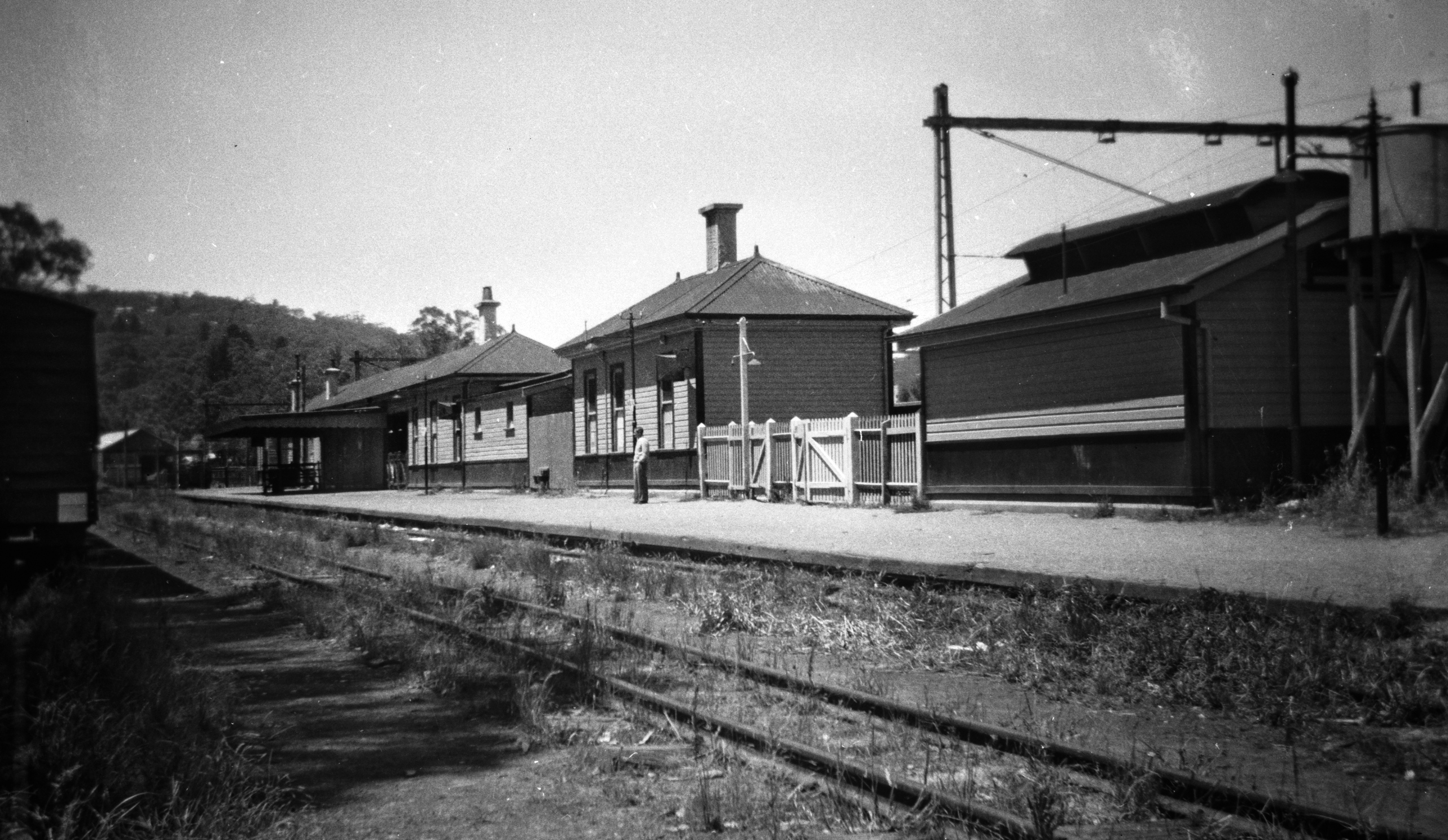
Upper Ferntree Gully station, narrow gauge side, c.1956 (Frank Stamford)

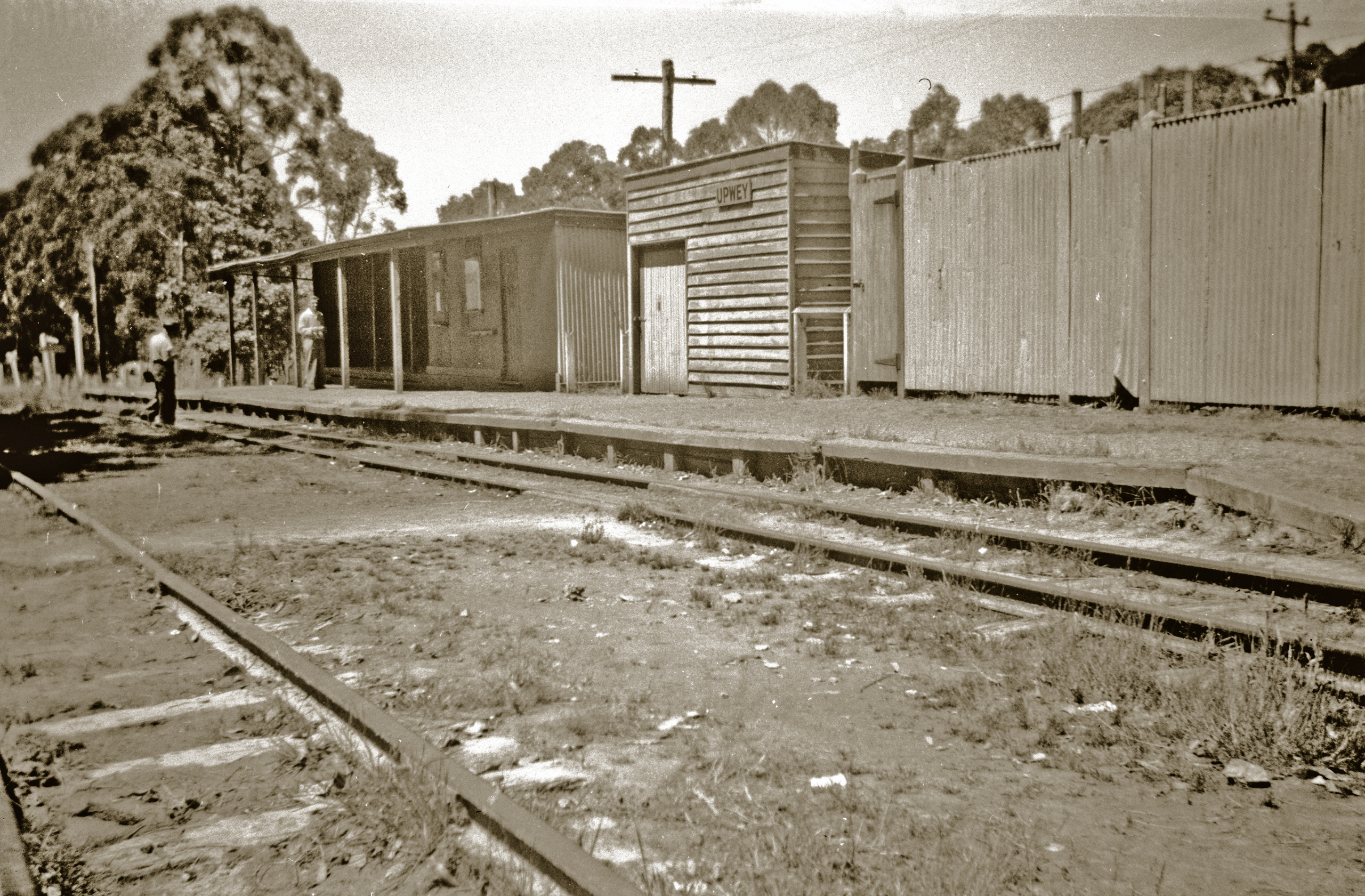
Upwey station, Puffing Billy railway; 1955 (Frank Stamford)

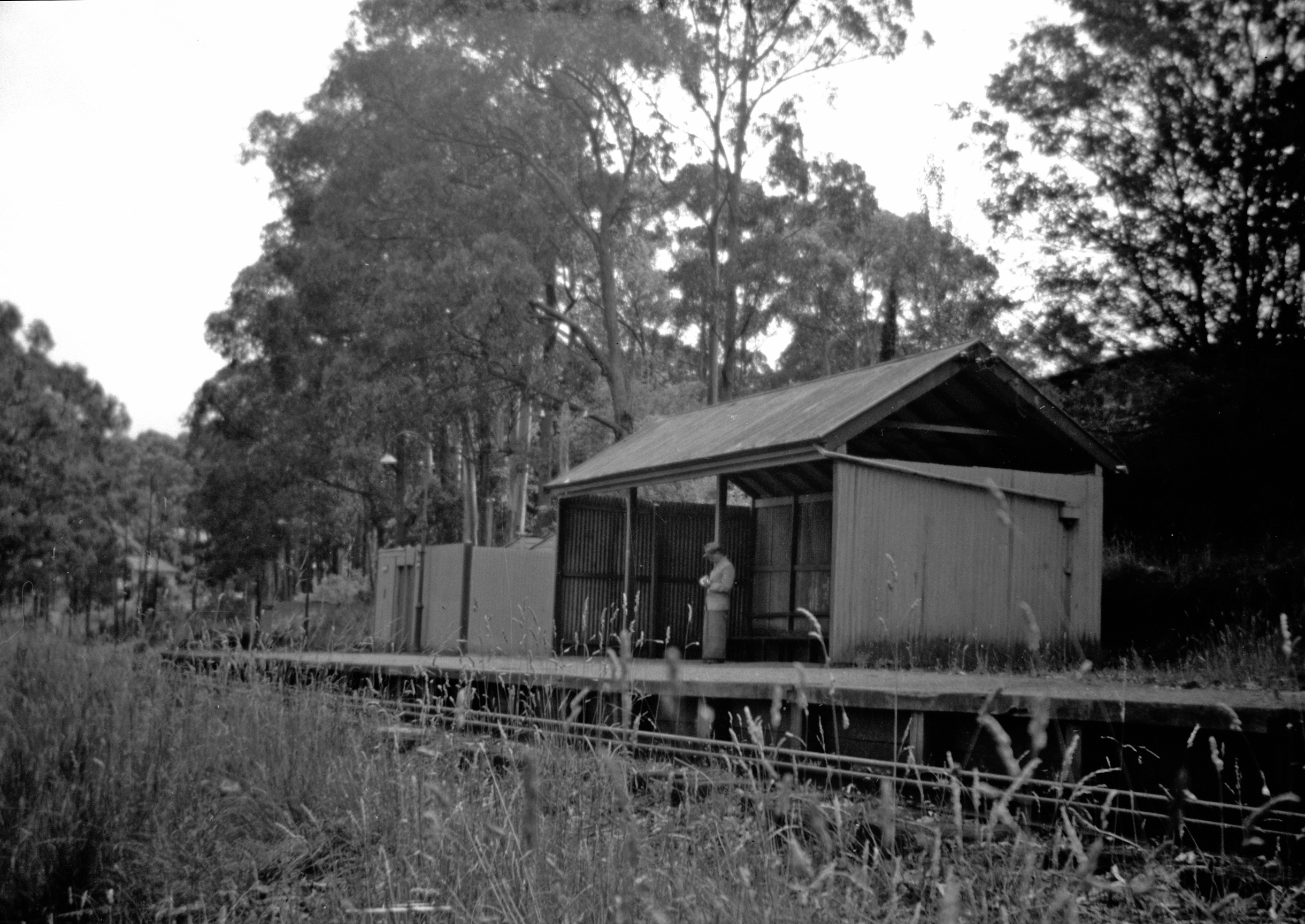
Tecoma station, 1955 (Frank Stamford)

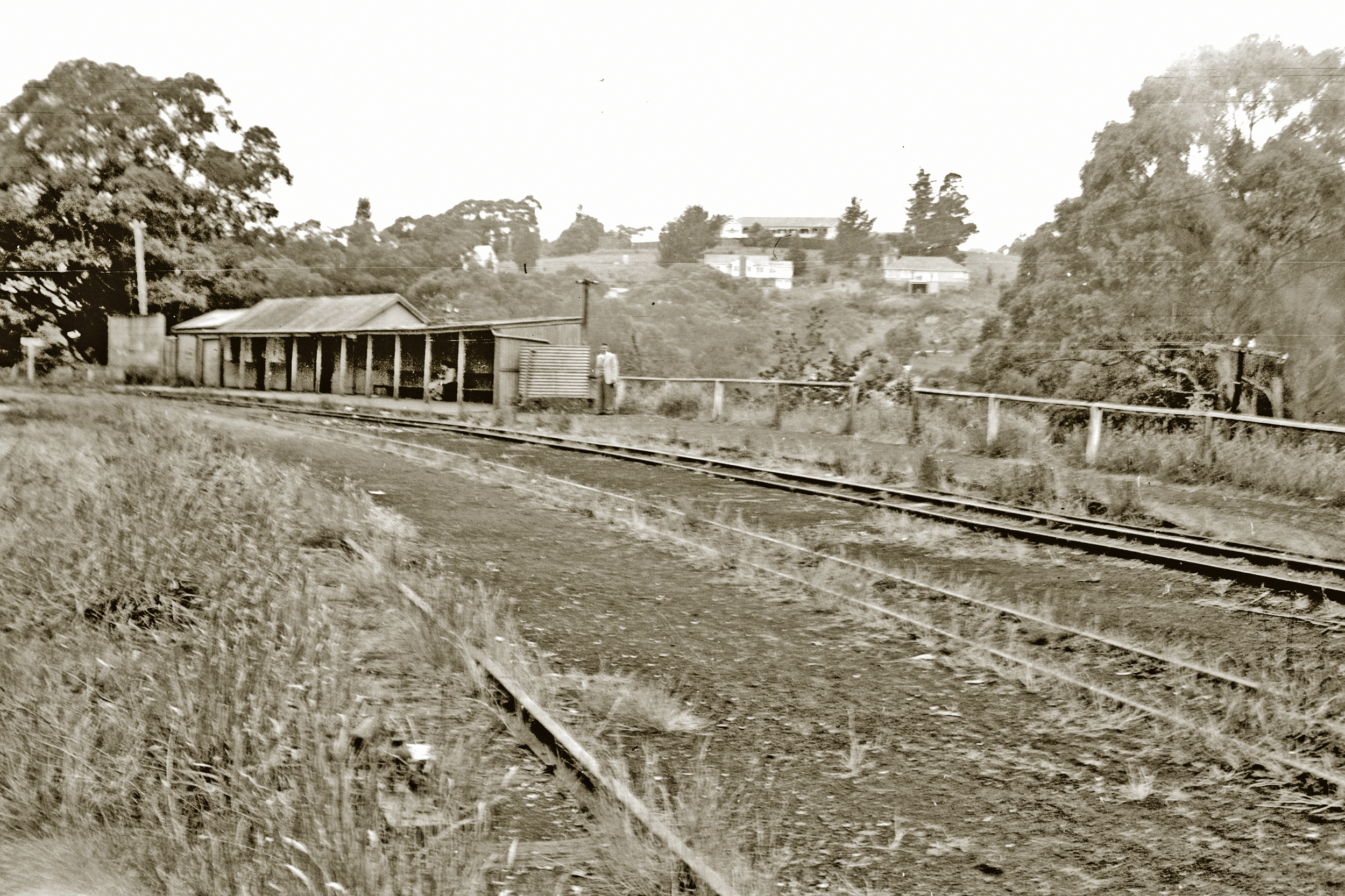
Belgrave station; circa 1955-56 (Frank Stamford)

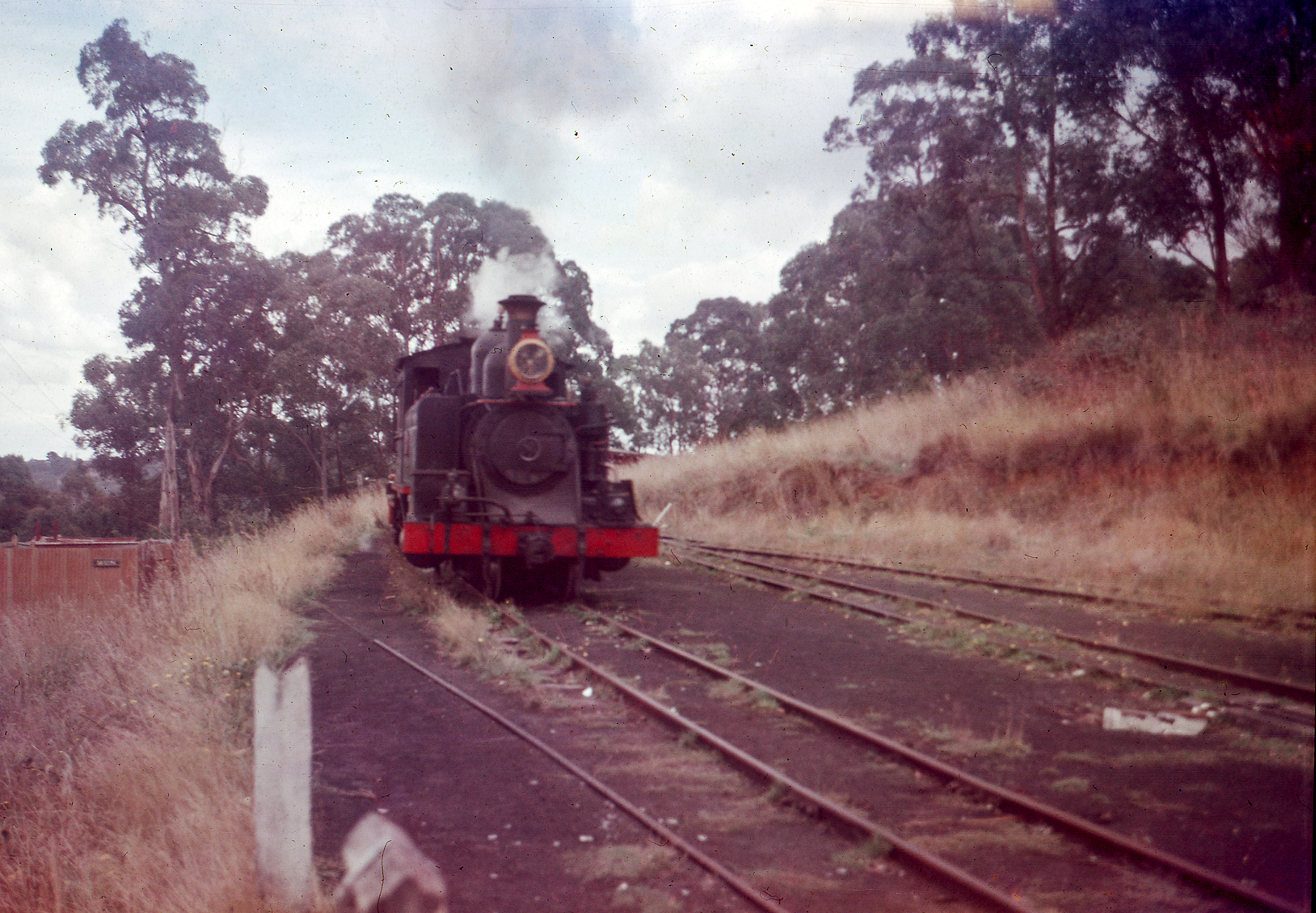
Belgrave up end in 1958 (Frank Stamford)

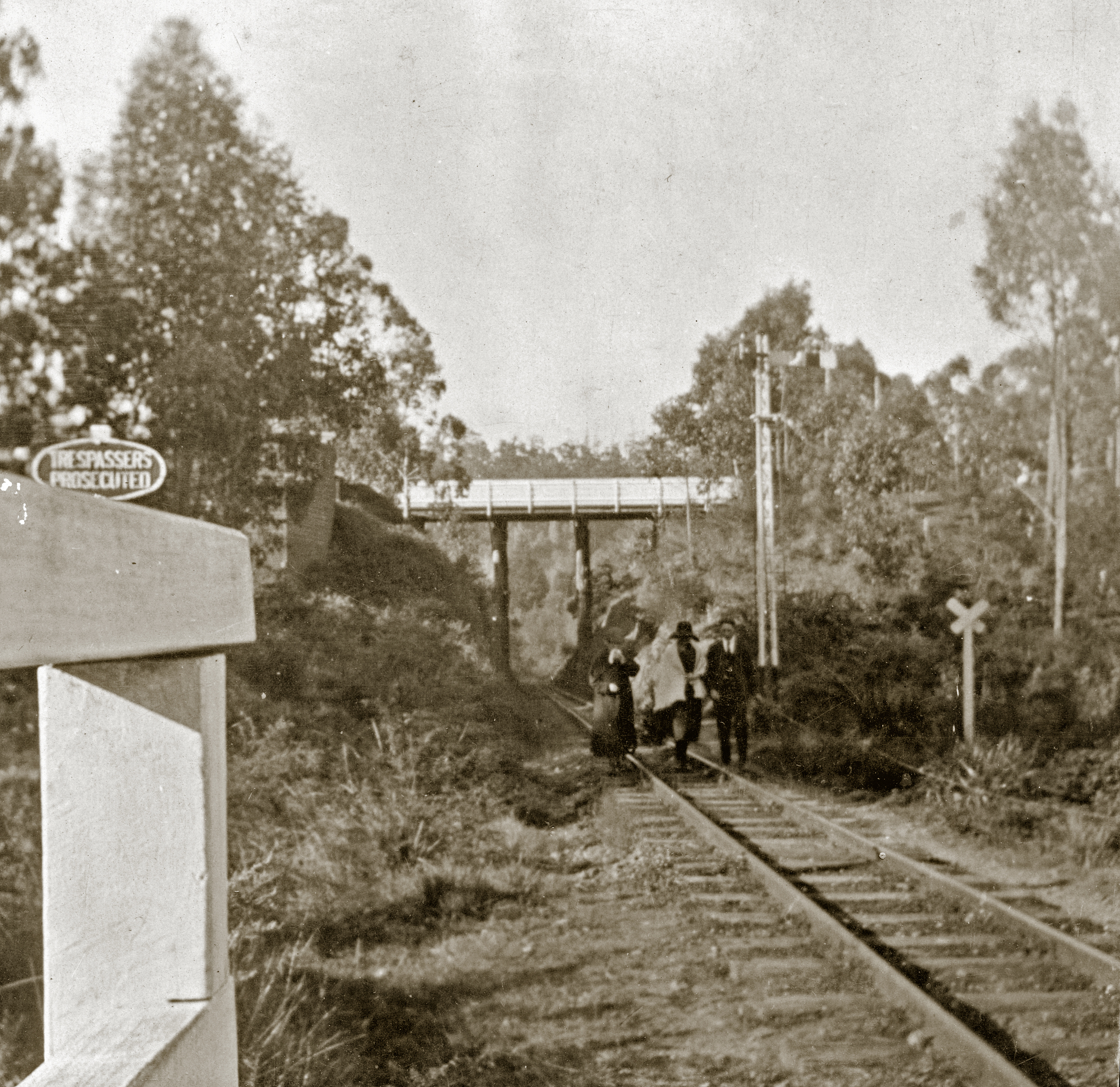
Down end Belgrave station, 1921 (facing north). Bridge No.4 in the background is today's Belgrave-Gembrook Road bridge.

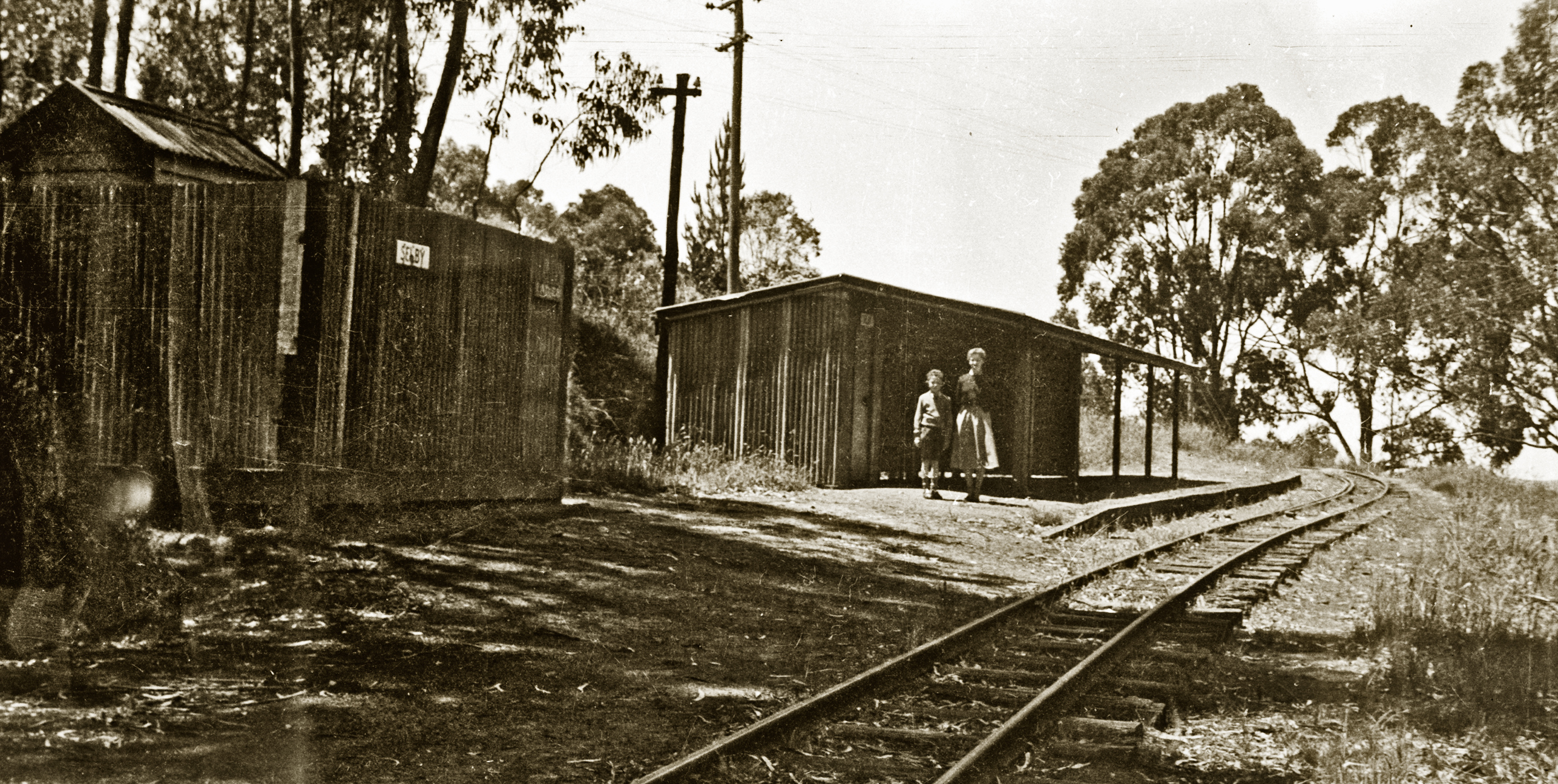
Selby railway station c.1953-54 (Laurence Stamford)

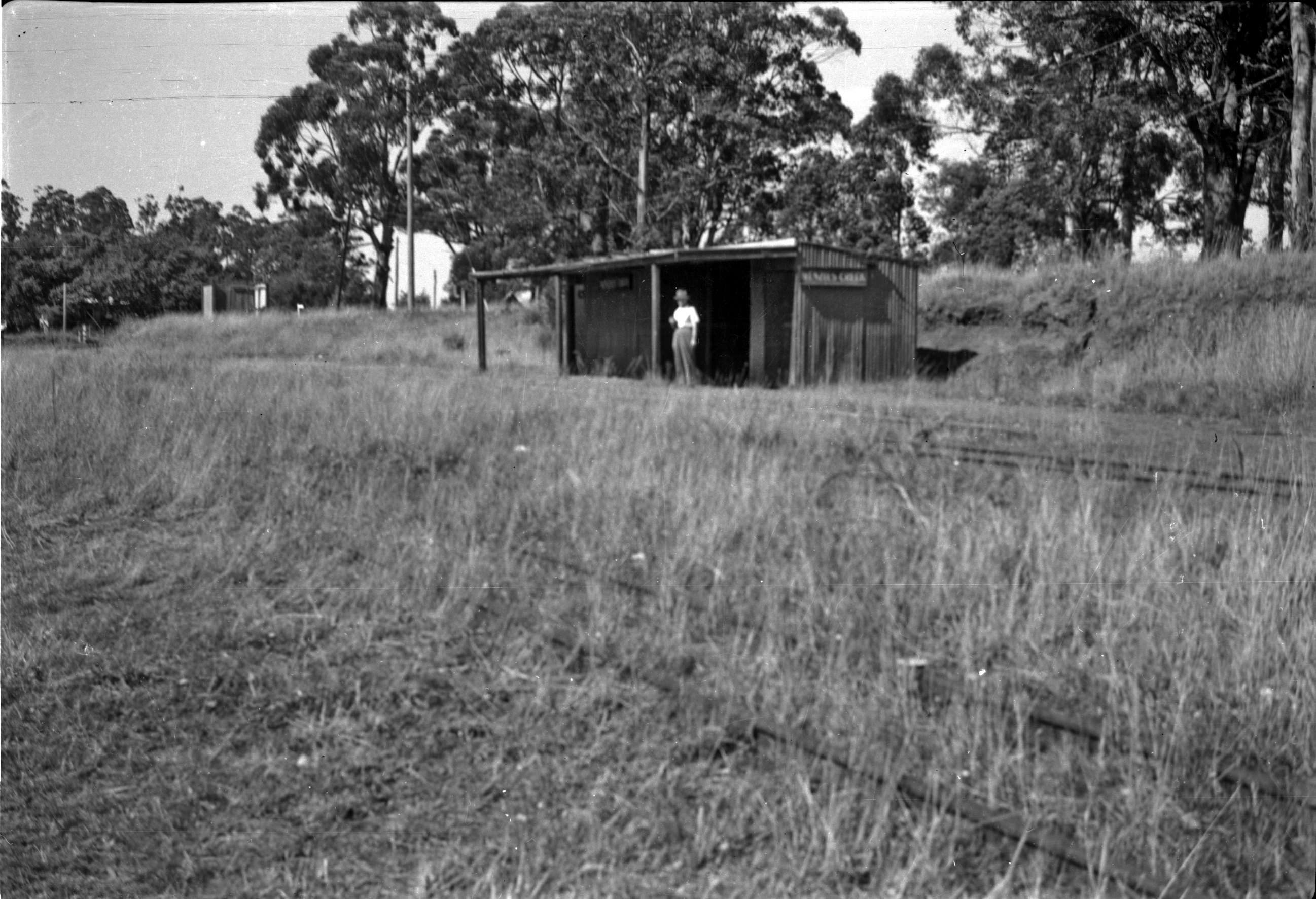
Menzies Creek railway station c.1955 (Frank Stamford)

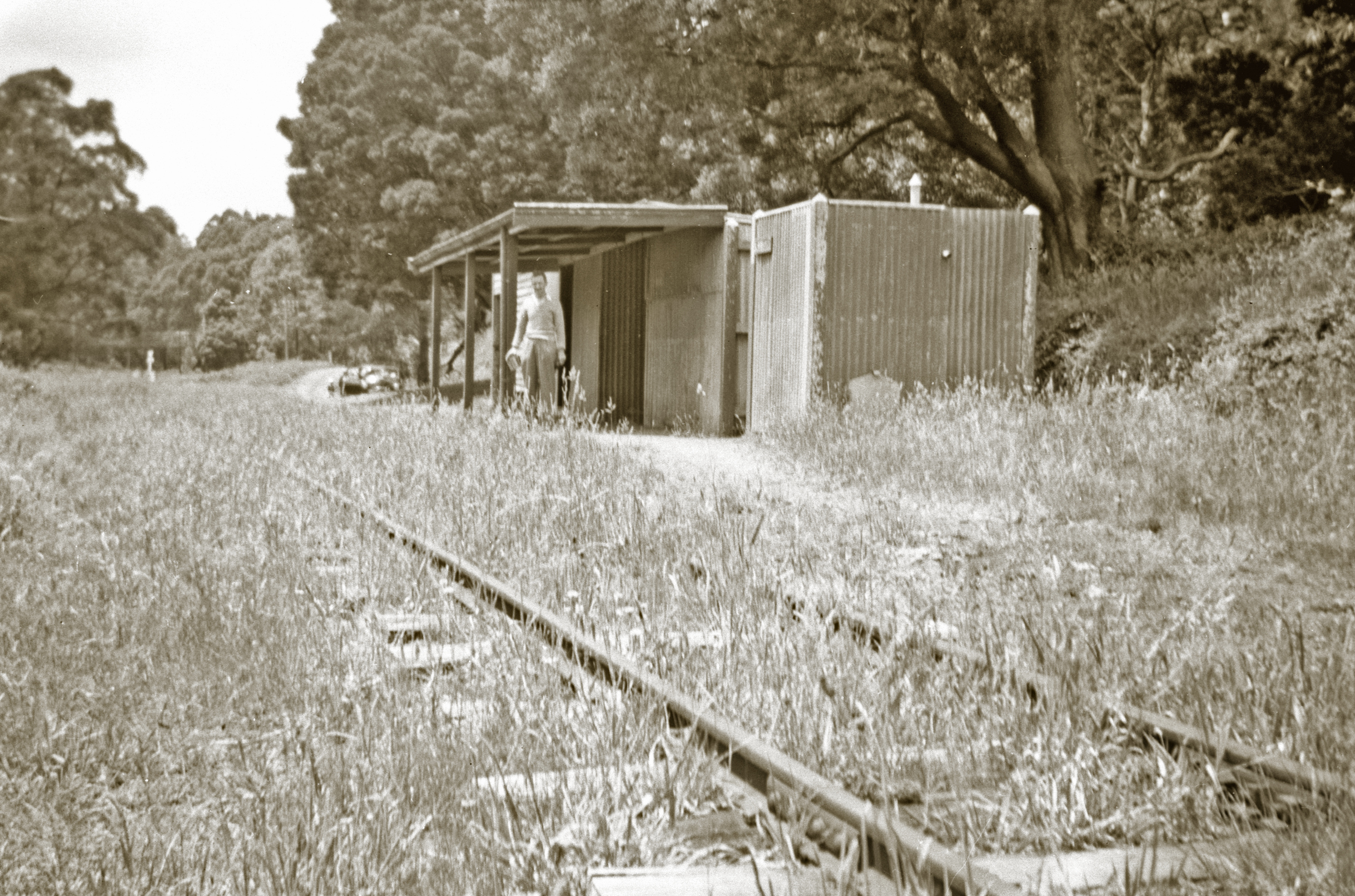
Clematis station; circa 1955 (Frank Stamford)

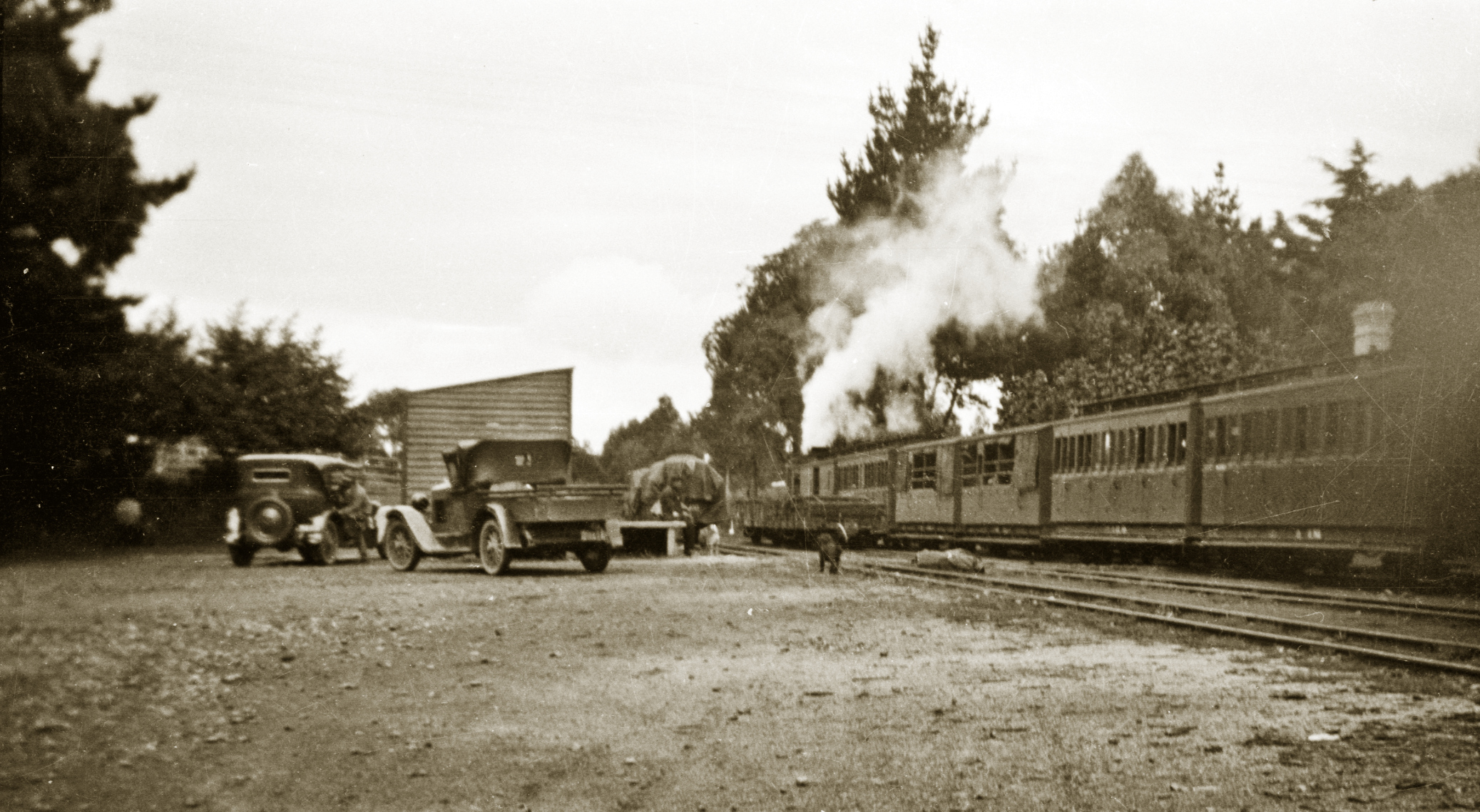
Emerald station and platform circa 1930 (Laurence Stamford)

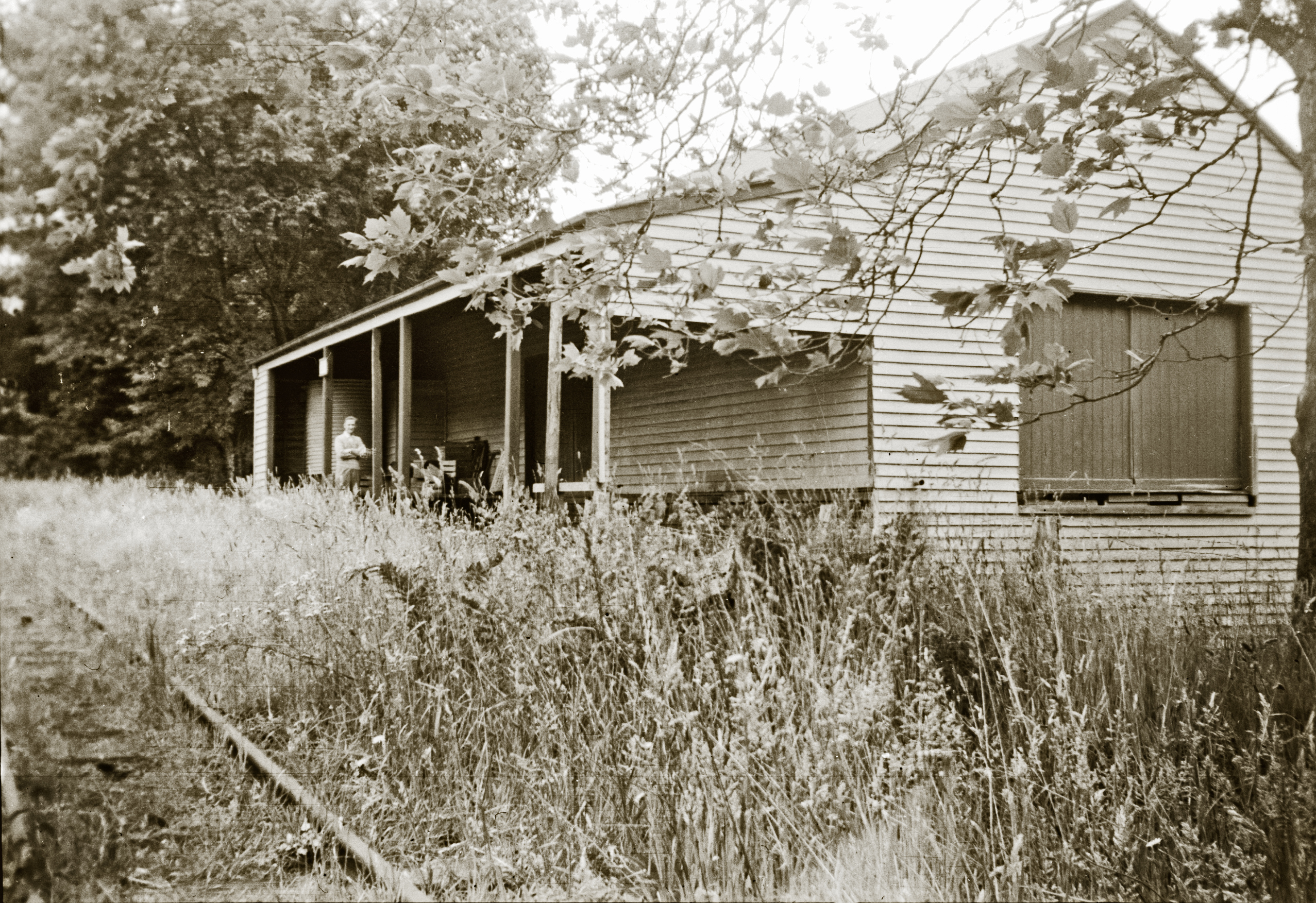
Puffing Billy, Nobelius Siding; circa 1956 (Frank Stamford)

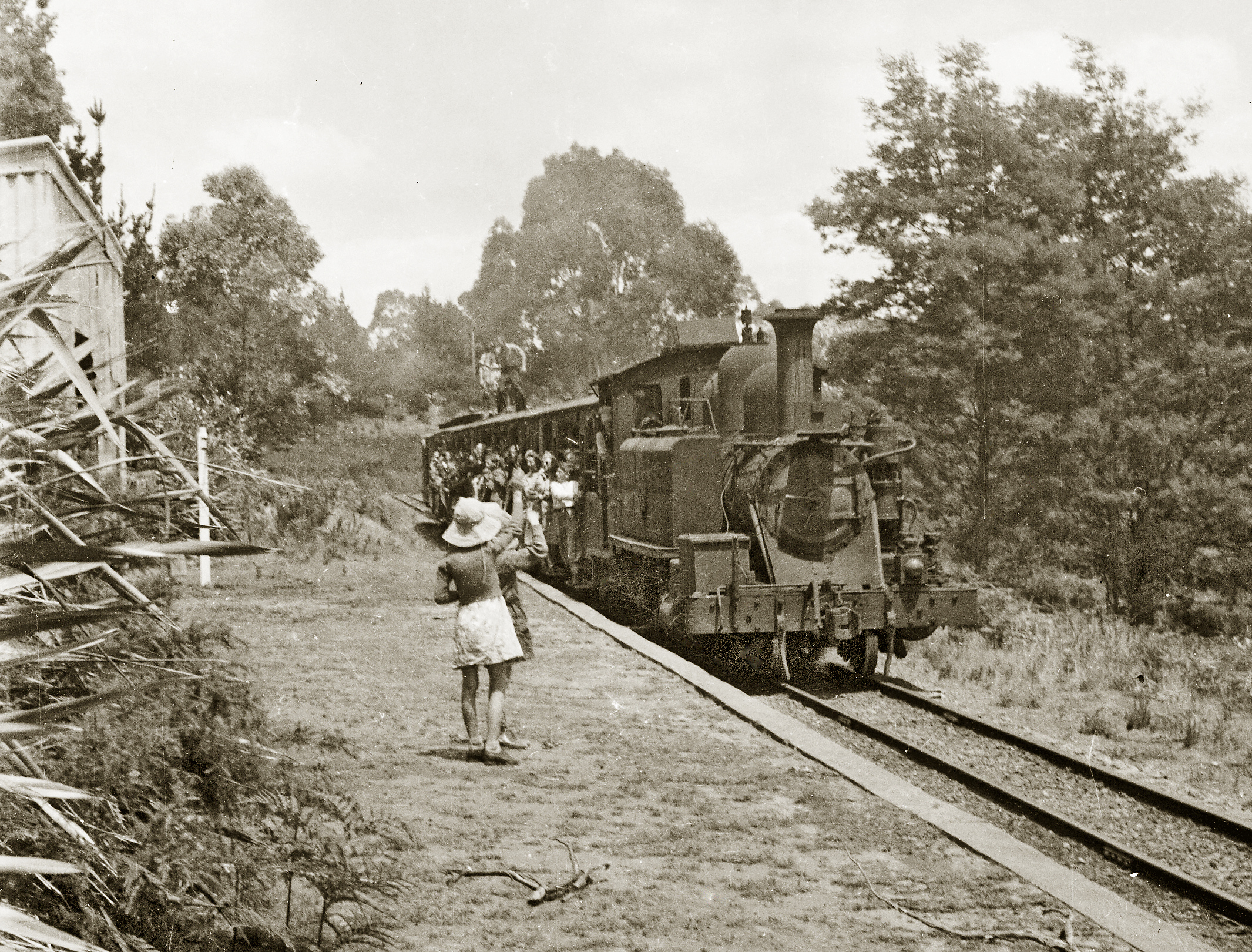
Nobelius station, about 1945.(Laurence Stamford)

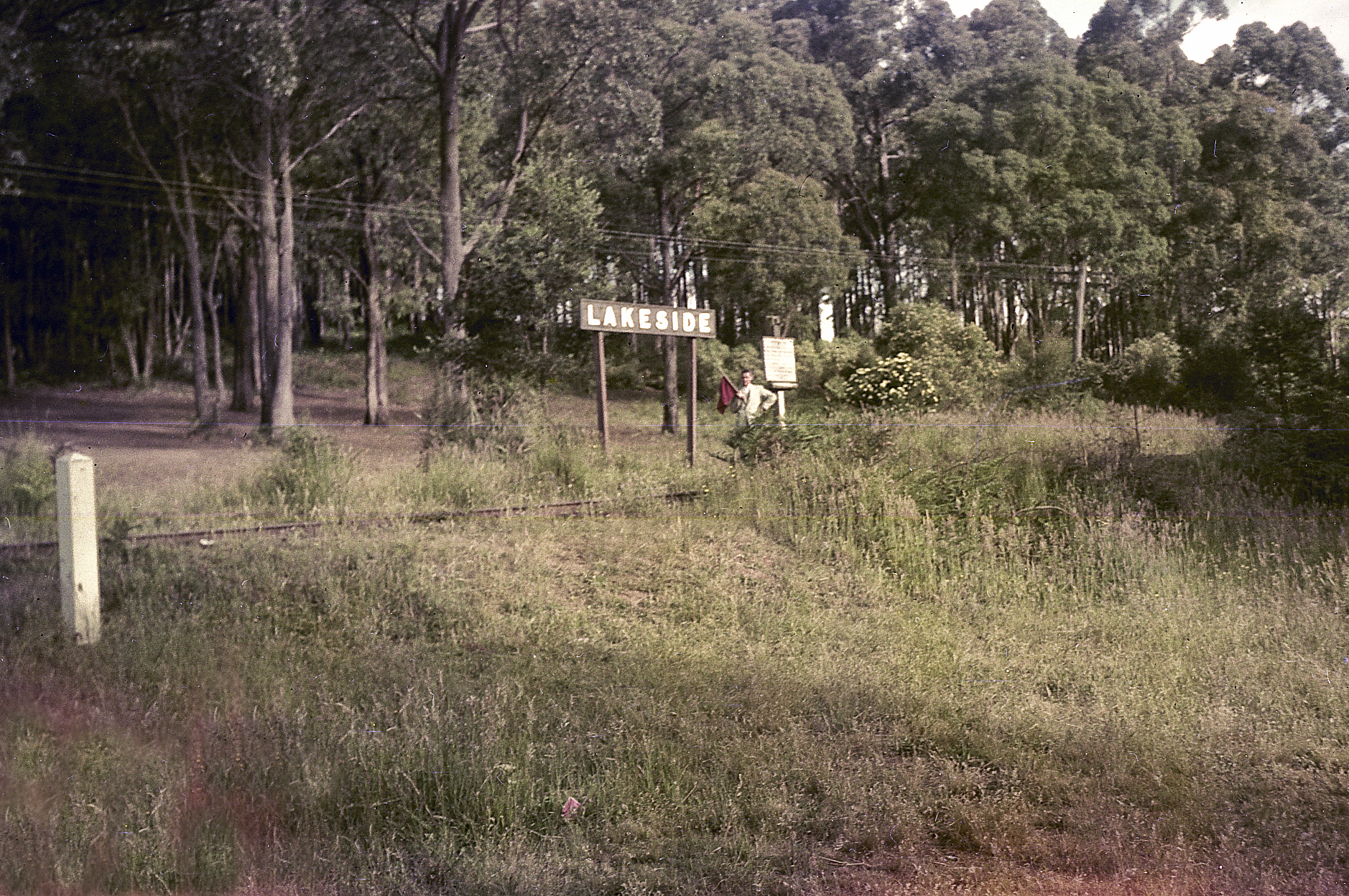
Lakeside station; 1958 (Frank Stamford)

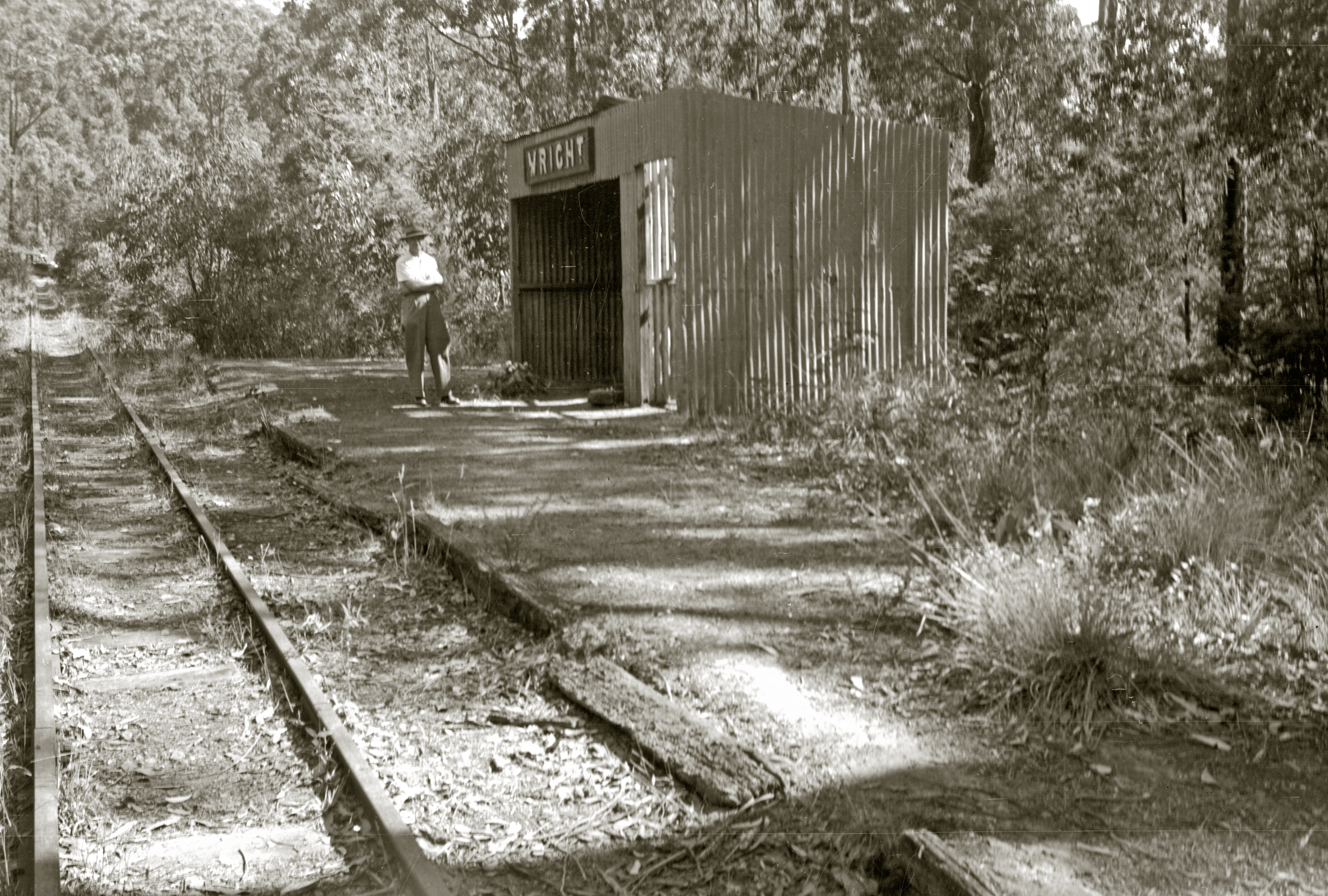
Wright railway station, 1958 (Frank Stamford)

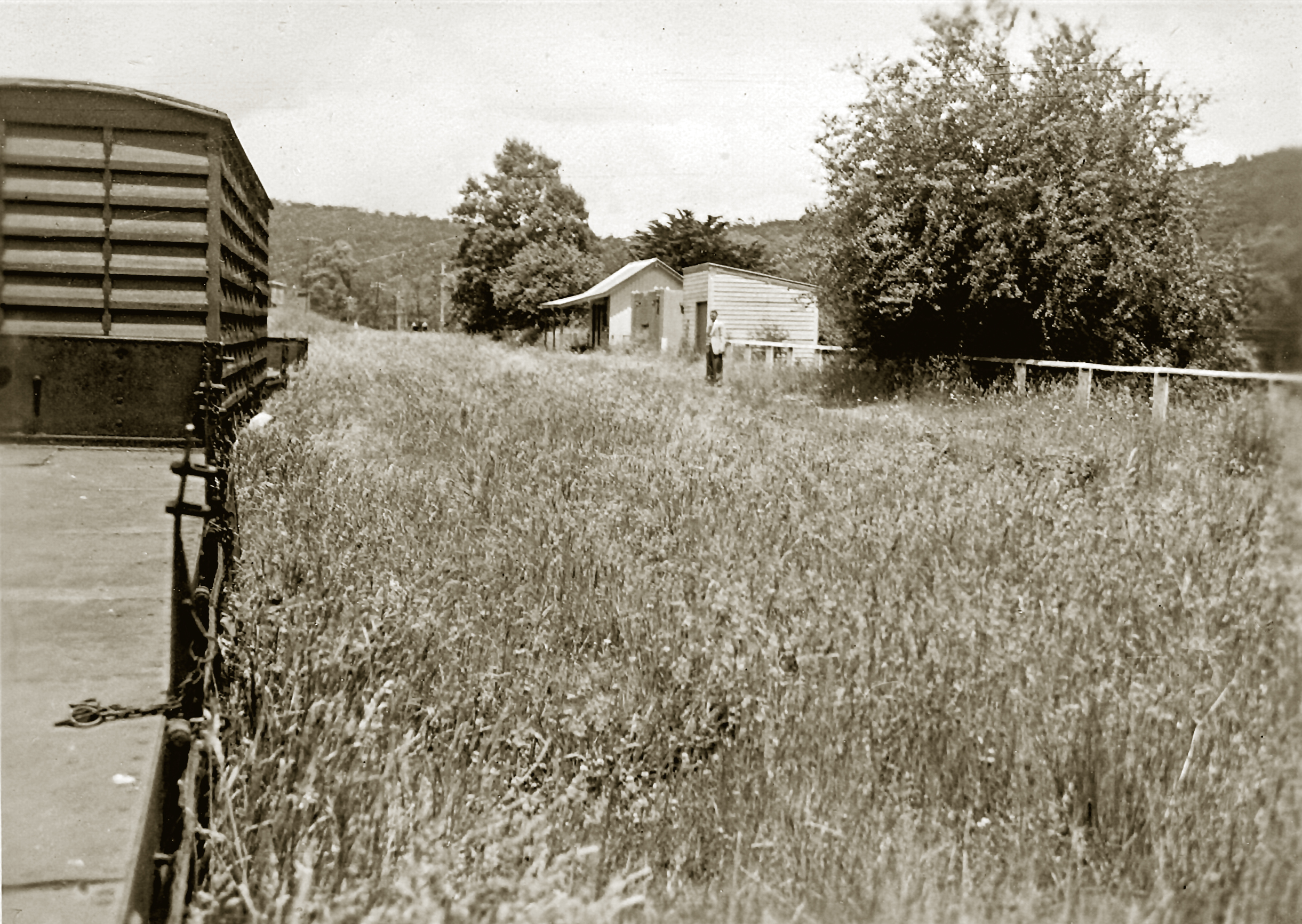
Cockatoo railway station c.1955 with abandoned wagons after line closure due to landslide (Frank Stamford)

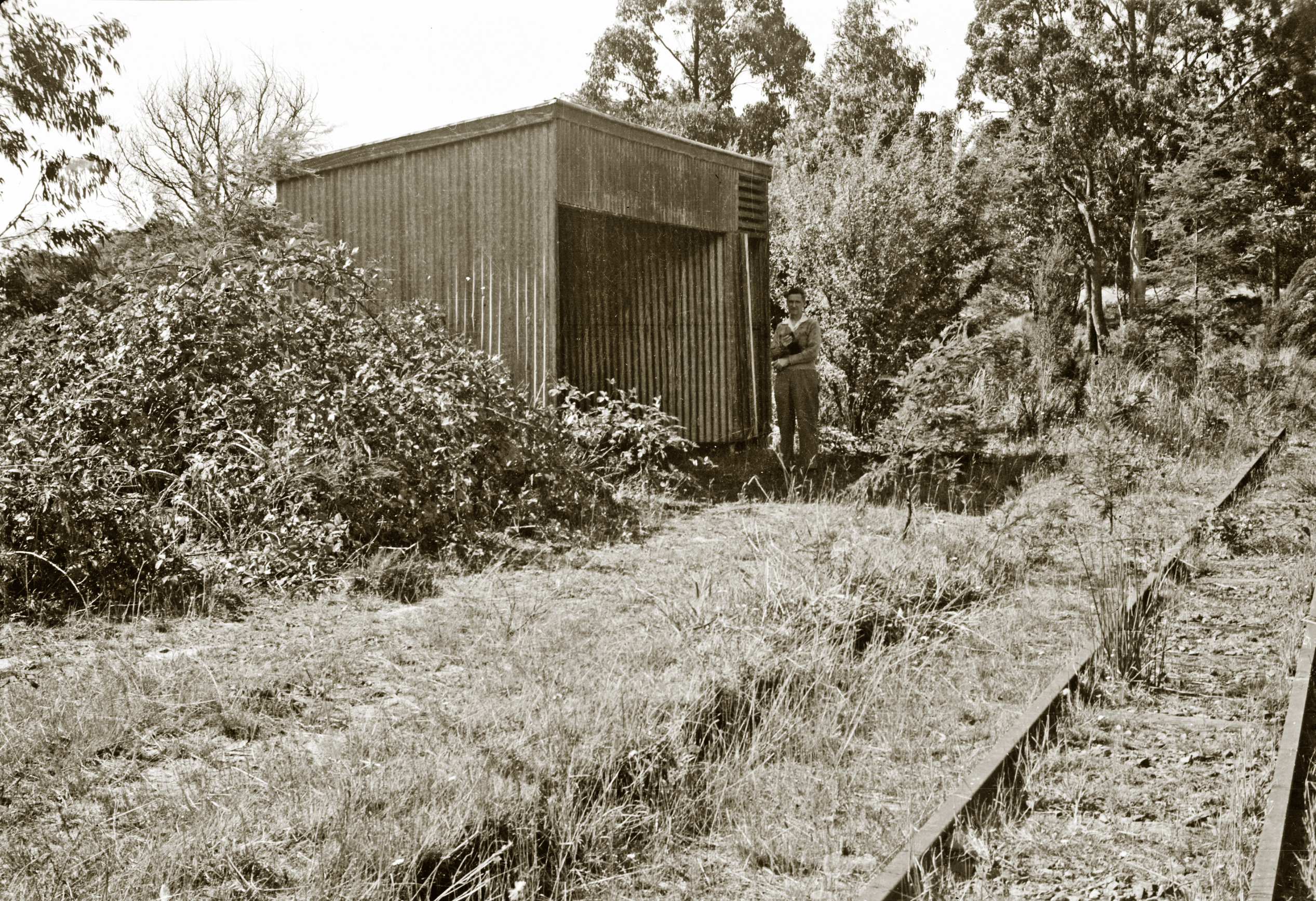
Fielder station; circa 1958 (Frank Stamford)

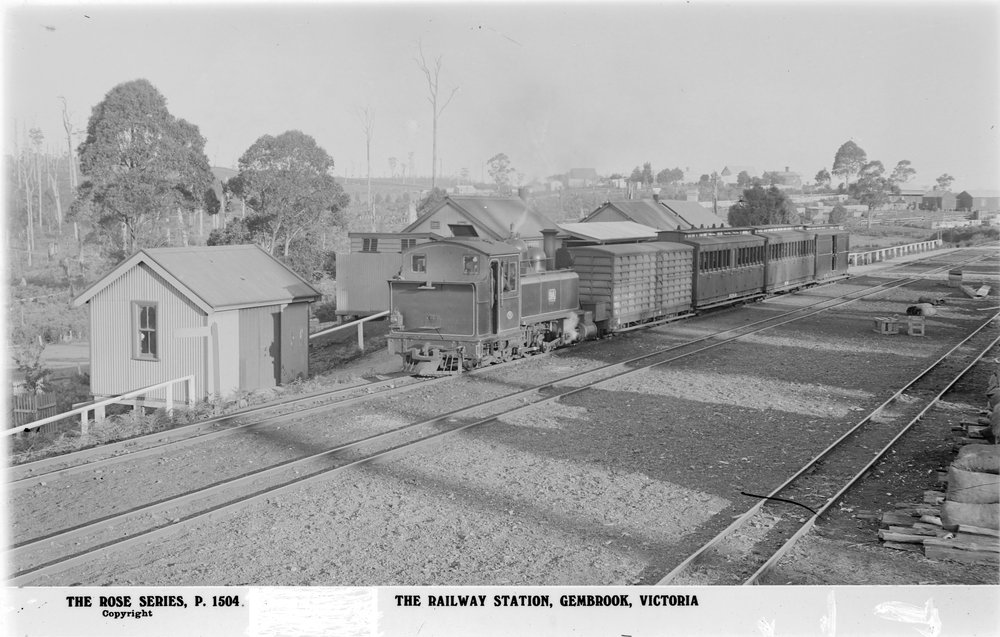
Gembrook Railway Station c.1920s

==== Upper Ferntree Gully station ====
Upper Ferntree Gully station opened on 4 December 1889, when the railway line from Ringwood was extended. After December 1900, it became the break-of-gauge station between the broad gauge used in most of Victoria, and the narrow gauge. In 1954, the narrow gauge line was closed. However, the line as far as Belgrave was rebuilt as a broad gauge electrified railway, which opened on 18 February 1962.

==== Upwey station ====
Upwey station opened on 3 June 1901 and, like the suburb itself, was named after the homestead Upwey, which was named by a local family who purchased the property in 1897. The name itself comes from Upwey in Dorset, England, which is located on the River Wey. On 30 April 1954, the station, along with the rest of the line, was closed to traffic. On 19 February 1962, Upwey reopened, when the line as far as Belgrave was converted to broad gauge and electrified.

==== Tecoma railway station ====
Tecoma station opened on 1 December 1924. The station was named by the Victorian Railways for the plant Tecoma, which was grown in the area. It initially closed on 30 April 1954, then reopened on 19 February 1962.

==== Belgrave railway station ====
Belgrave station originally opened on 18 December 1900 as Monbulk, and was renamed Belgrave on 21 November 1904. The station was on the Upper Ferntree Gully – Gembrook narrow gauge line, and was located approximately where the modern station car park is situated.

Following a landslide between Selby and Menzies Creek in the previous year, on 30 April 1954, the station closed, along with the rest of the line. From 9 April 1955 until 23 February 1958, the Victorian Railways resumed operations between Upper Ferntree Gully and Belgrave, which was provided under a guarantee against losses by a citizens committee.

==== Belgrave (Puffing Billy) railway station ====
On 21 July 1962, a new station for the narrow gauge line was provided, along with the re-opening of the line as far as Menzies Creek as the Puffing Billy Railway. The Belgrave narrow gauge station is approximately 100 metres north of the metropolitan broad gauge station, and serves as the starting point for the Puffing Billy Railway. A short footpath under Belgrave-Gembrook Rd provides a pedestrian connection between the two stations. In the preservation era, this is also the site of the Belgrave Workshops.

==== Selby station ====
The station was opened in May 1904, and was named after the local landowner and Shire President George W. Selby.It was originally part of the Upper Ferntree Gully to Gembrook line. In 1921, the construction of a railway siding was proposed. In 1952, a major landslide occurred between Selby and Menzies Creek station, causing the Gembrook line's closure in 1954.

In 1962, Selby station reopened to passenger traffic when the section from Belgrave to Menzies Creek was reopened as the Puffing Billy Railway.

==== Menzies Creek station ====
Menzies Creek railway station was opened with the line on 18 December 1900. It was named after an early settler John Menzies. On 5 December 1904 it was renamed Aura, after the estate of the Shire President. The station reverted to its previous name on 4 July 1947. Throughout this period, the Post Office kept the name of the town as Menzies Creek. When the station was operating under the Victorian Railways it had a loop siding, a standard portable station building, and a goods shed.

In the preservation era, this is also the site of the Menzies Creek Steam Museum; it also has an inspection pit for rolling stock, and a fourteen-lever McKenzie and Holland Cam and Soldier ("Rocker") lever frame.

==== Clematis station ====
Clematis railway station is situated near the town of Clematis. The station originated as an unnamed stopping place 8 1/2 mi (13.7 km) along the narrow gauge line from Upper Fern Tree Gully. In May 1902, the Victorian Railways requested that Fern Tree Gully Shire Council supply a name; the council selected Paradise Valley over the alternative, Lambie. A journalist on the line in 1903 observed that "stations on the line are only so by courtesy"; there were no facilities except an earthen platform. By 1909, the station was known simply as Paradise.

In 1921, the station was again renamed to Clematis to match the name of the nearby post office, with the aim of reducing confusion for passengers. A Fern Tree Gully councillor lamented "Paradise lost".

==== Emerald station ====
Emerald railway station is situated in the town of Emerald. It was opened with the Railway on 18 December 1900 and comprised a platform track and a loop siding.

In the preservation era, this is also the site of the Emerald Carriage Workshops.

==== Nobelius Siding station ====
Nobelius Siding is situated in Emerald. The siding was built in 1904 to serve the adjacent packing shed, built in the same year, from which nursery seedlings and plants were shipped throughout Australia by C.A. Nobelius' Gembrook Nurseries. The Nobelius nursery was once the largest plant nursery in the Southern Hemisphere with 200,000 trees grown on 180 hectares.

The Packing Shed has been restored by Puffing Billy volunteers and is now used by the Railway as a function centre, particularly as a venue for Puffing Billy’s various evening dining experiences, such as "Murder on the Puffing Billy Express".

==== Nobelius station ====
Nobelius railway station opened in 1927. It was named after the founder of the nearby Gembrook Nurseries, Carl Axel Nobelius, and his family.

In the preservation era the station consists of a short platform with a "Mallee Shed"-type corrugated iron waiting shelter, which includes a small lockable room, although there was a more substantial building in the past. Trains do not usually stop at the station, except by prior arrangement.

==== Lakeside station ====
Lakeside railway station was opened in 1944 to serve Emerald Lake Park, a popular picnic and recreation reserve created during World War II. The station originally consisted of a short single-face platform on the up side of the line, approximately on the site of the current locomotive water tanks. It had a name board and a red flag for intending passengers to signal to the train crew, but no shelter.

In the preservation era, this is also the site of the Emerald Lake Model Railway and the Lakeside Visitor Centre. It is also the site of a working wig-wag level crossing warning signal, which operates at the former park access road between the platform and storage siding, which may be the last regularly operating wig-wag signal in Australia.

==== Wright station ====
Wright railway station opened on 24 October 1904 as part of the Gembrook railway line. It served the Wright Forest and small township of Avonsleigh, and consisted of only a small Mallee shed and a name board. After the Gembrook line was officially closed the site fell into disrepair, and by the 1990s little trace of Wright remained. However, by that time, efforts were being made to extend the railway to the entire length of the original line from Lakeside through to Gembrook. Wright was officially re-opened on 18 October 1998, but a replica of the original shed was not rebuilt until sometime later. Trains do not normally stop at Wright.

==== Cockatoo station ====
Cockatoo railway station is situated in the town of the same name. It opened with the line on 18 December 1900 as Devon, but was renamed Cockatoo Creek on 29 July 1901 and subsequently shortened to Cockatoo in 1904. There was originally a platform road and a loop siding, but a crossing loop was later added in between the two. A single 12ft by 20 ft timber portable station building was provided which was later extended. Other associated buildings such as toilets and a van good shed were also on the platform while a weatherboard goods shed was provided on the loop siding (No. 3 Road).

Today, the loop siding has been provided again along with the platform track, but the crossing loop is yet to be rebuilt. A platform exists which initially had a temporary non-heritage building provided for safe working purposes only, but during 2007 a heritage type building, obtained second-hand from another Victorian station, was relocated to Cockatoo. Although it is not representative of the original building, it nevertheless is a typical building of the day and now provides a more suitable safe working office than the non-heritage building previously used for this purpose, which was subsequently removed in 2009. Whilst trains normally stop at Cockatoo, very few passengers join or alight.

Plans to recreate all structures on the platform to their mid-1920s configuration are well advanced with a start to be made in the very near future.

==== Fielder station ====
Fielder opened as a Stopping Place on Monday 10 September 1928, as part of the Gembrook railway line. It was originally an unnamed platform, with time tables noting a station at 38 miles (61 km). In 1929, local Harry Watson constructed a Mallee shed and unofficially named it Ancaster after his home town in Lincolnshire, England, but this was quickly changed by some children to Laura, who was a young local girl. The Victorian Railways officially named it Fielder from Tuesday 5 February 1929, after a nearby resident. It was planned to name the station after the two local residents Cullen and Fielder and combinations of the two names were suggested, however Fielder was the name finally chosen. It remained nothing more than a Mallee shed with small office and a name board for the rest of its operating life.

It was closed with the line on 30 April 1954 and the Mallee shed was sold to US Buslines for unknown use. After closure, the site fell into disrepair, and by the 1990s, little trace of Fielder remained. In 1996, a group of volunteers led by Richard Schurmann in collaboration with the descendants of the Fielder family rebuilt the platform and waiting shed, which was officially re-opened on Saturday 19 April 1997 in preparation for the extension of the line which re-opened in 1998. On 18 November 2012 a plaque was unveiled on the station shed in tribute to the Fielder Family. Trains do not normally stop at Fielder.

==== Gembrook station ====
Gembrook railway station is located in the township of Gembrook in Victoria, Australia, east of Melbourne. It was opened with the line on 18 December 1900 and closed on 30 April 1954. The line was rebuilt to the Gembrook terminus in 1998 by the Puffing Billy Railway. Heritage steam trains operated by Puffing Billy now stop at a new "Town" platform located on the site of a former siding. A "heritage" station has also been constructed on the site of the original Gembrook station. It has a layout very similar to that of the station in the 1920s, with only minor alterations to meet modern requirements.

== Fleet ==
Engines and rolling stock would have been rotated on an as-required basis, largely to accommodate maintenance requirements that could not be handled on site. As noted above, the original vehicles were delivered with identifying codes equivalent to the broad gauge system, e.g. the open wagons were classed "QR" without distinguishing between those and the broad gauge QR trucks. The locomotives were originally classed "A", and referred to as, for example, "1A (narrow gauge)", though later documents used the class "^{N}A" to distinguish them from various classes of broad gauge "A" class engines. The passenger and goods fleets had an "N" prefix added around the time the line opened, usually but not always as a superscript and in various positions. In 1910 the passenger codes were simplified, e.g. ^{N}BD^{BD} became NBC, and in 1926 the goods fleet codes were similarly altered.

=== Carriages, Trucks and Vans ===
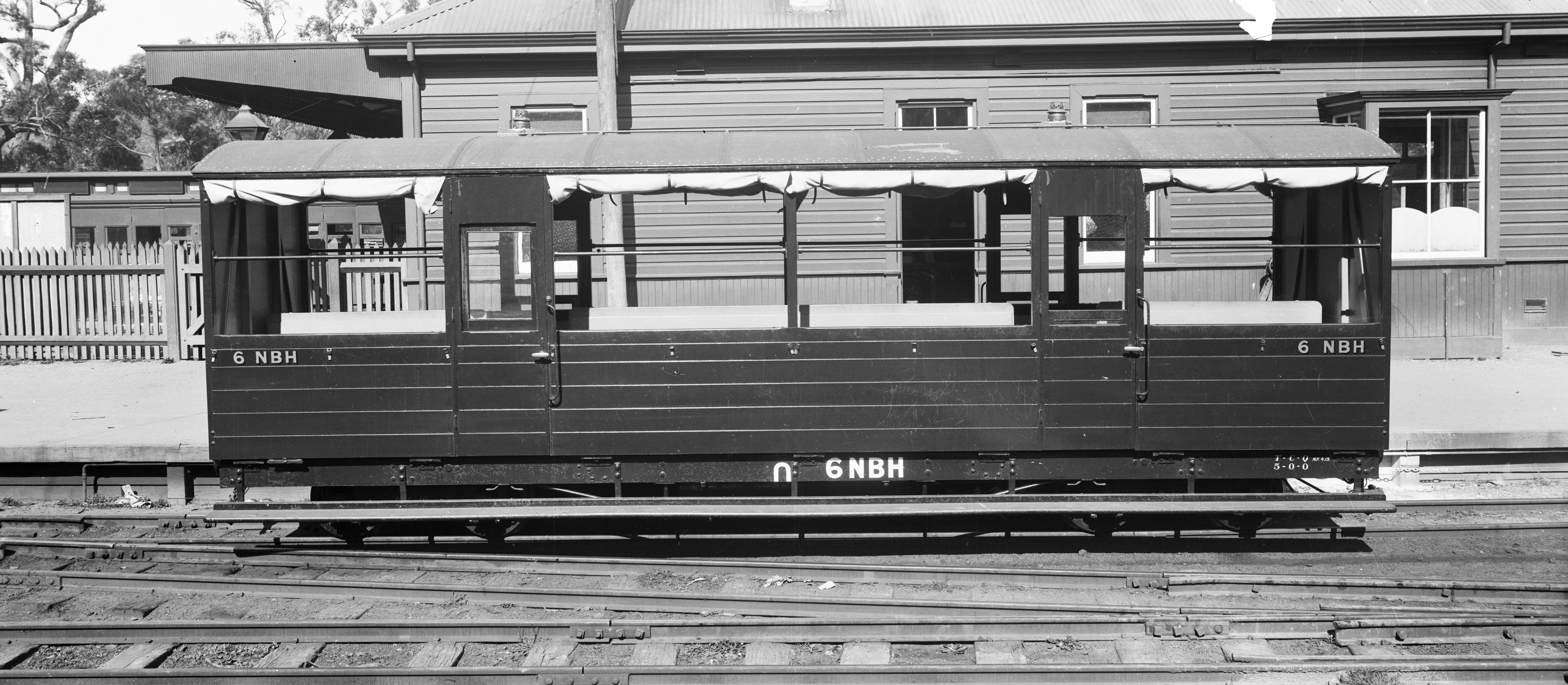
Narrow gauge carriage 6NBH at Upper Fern Tree Gully

== Operations ==
=== Safeworking ===
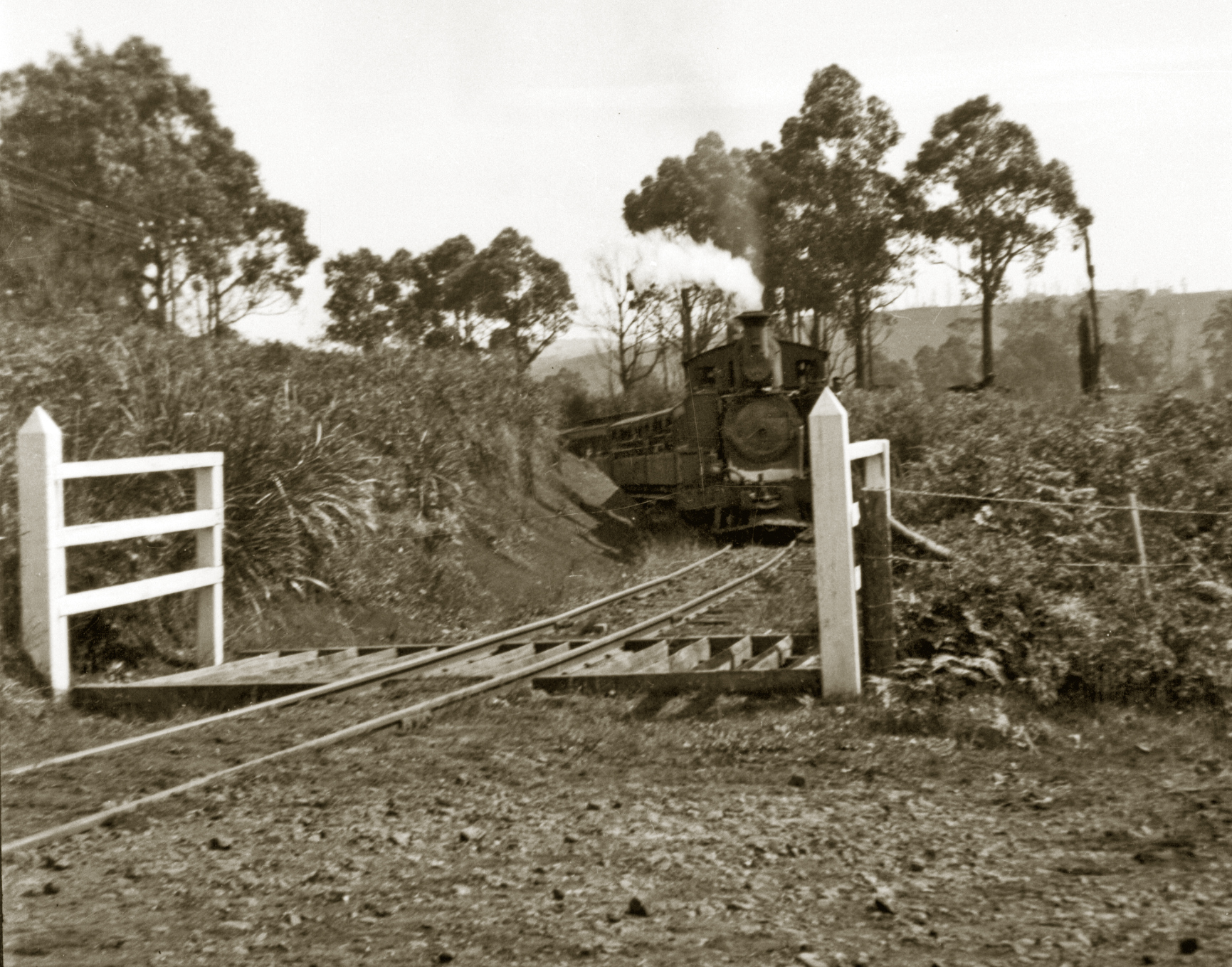
A train approaching the Pinnocks Road level crossing at Emerald, about 1926. The cattle pit was designed to discourage livestock from entering the rail reserve (Laurence Stamford)

=== Incidents ===
On 3 August 1953, a landslide occurred between Selby and Menzies Creek, which saw the closure of the line on 30 April 1954.

== Closure and legacy ==
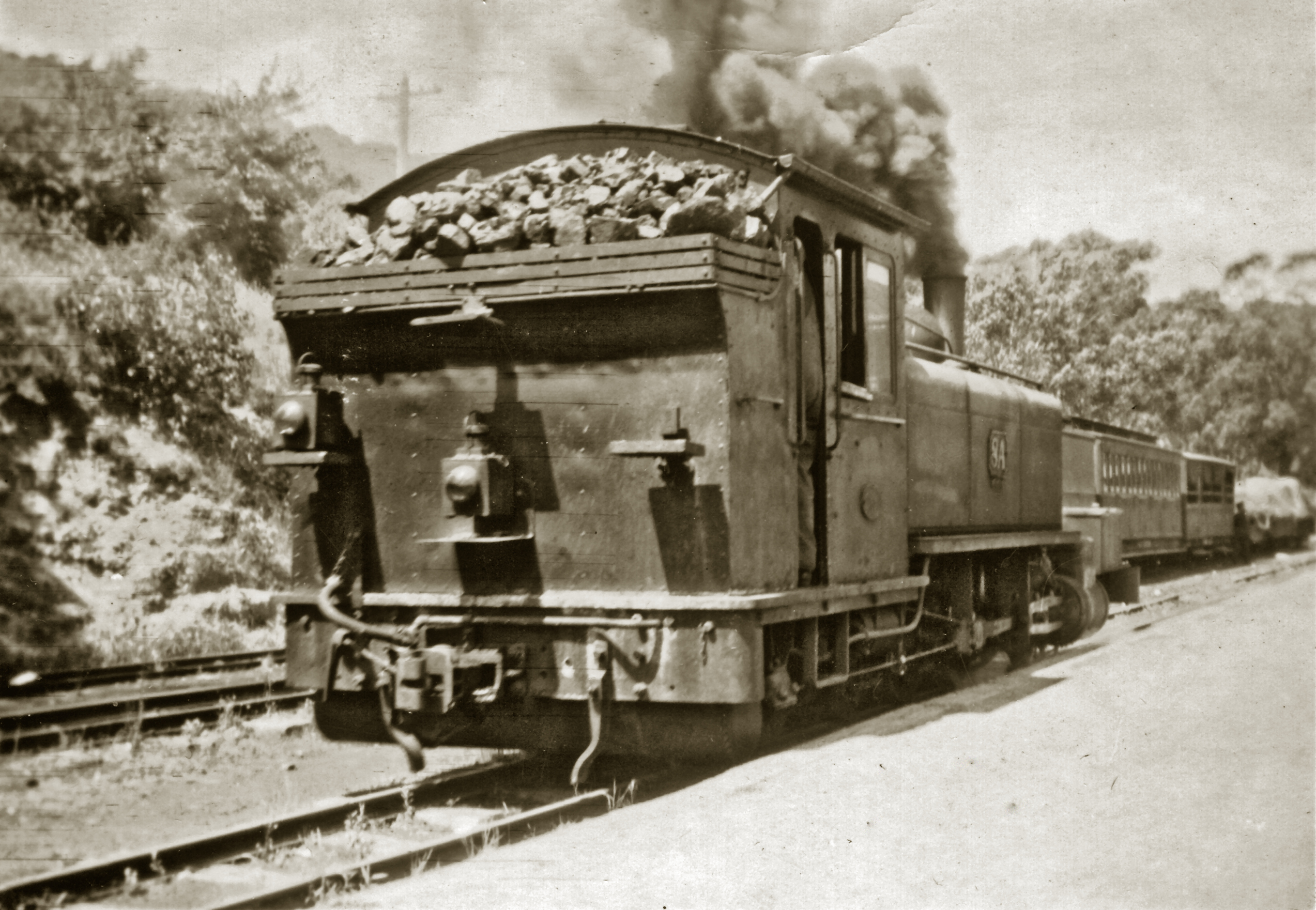
Upper Ferntree Gully Locomotive, engine 8A c.1950

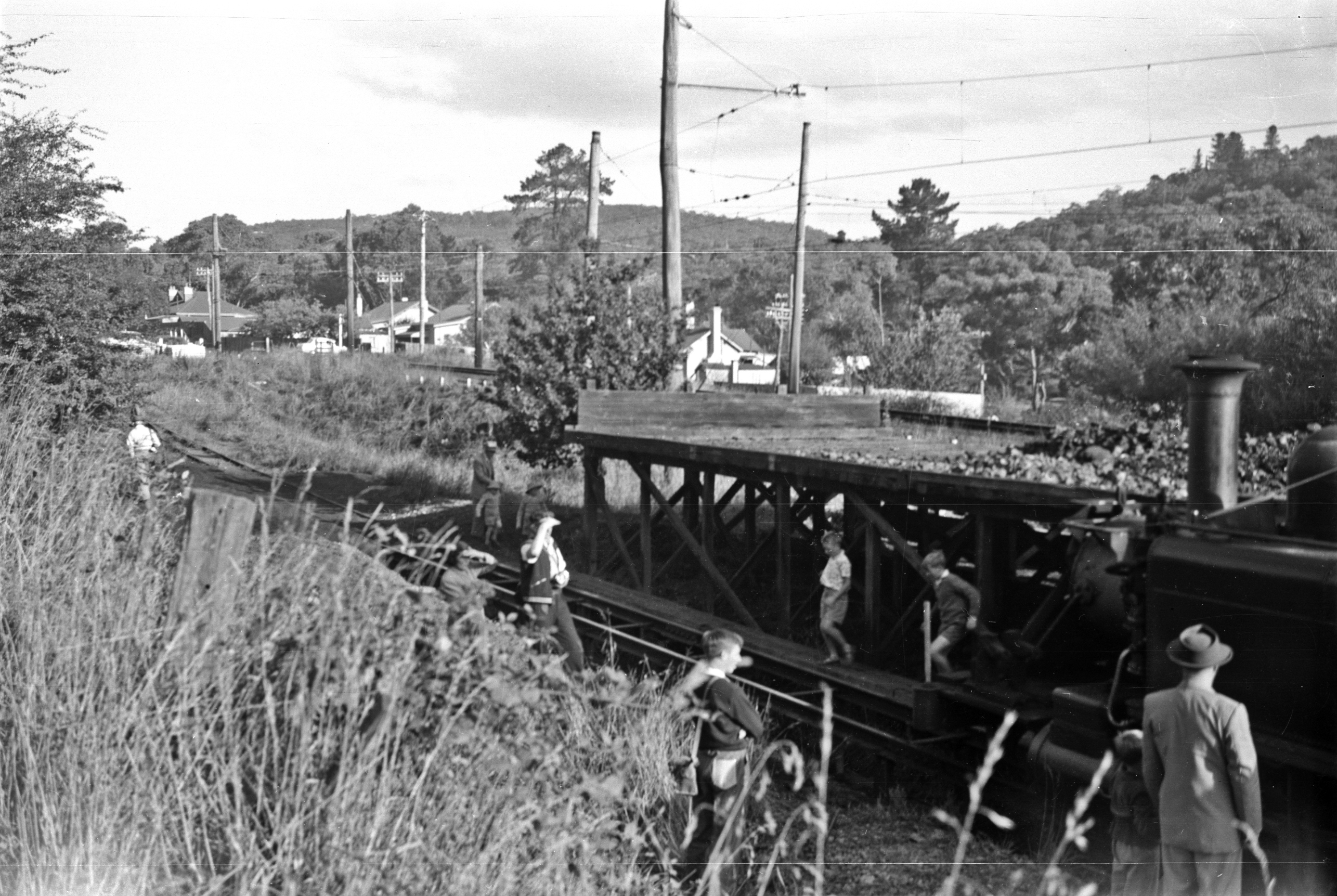
Upper Ferntree Gully coal stage, narrow gauge side, at up end of station

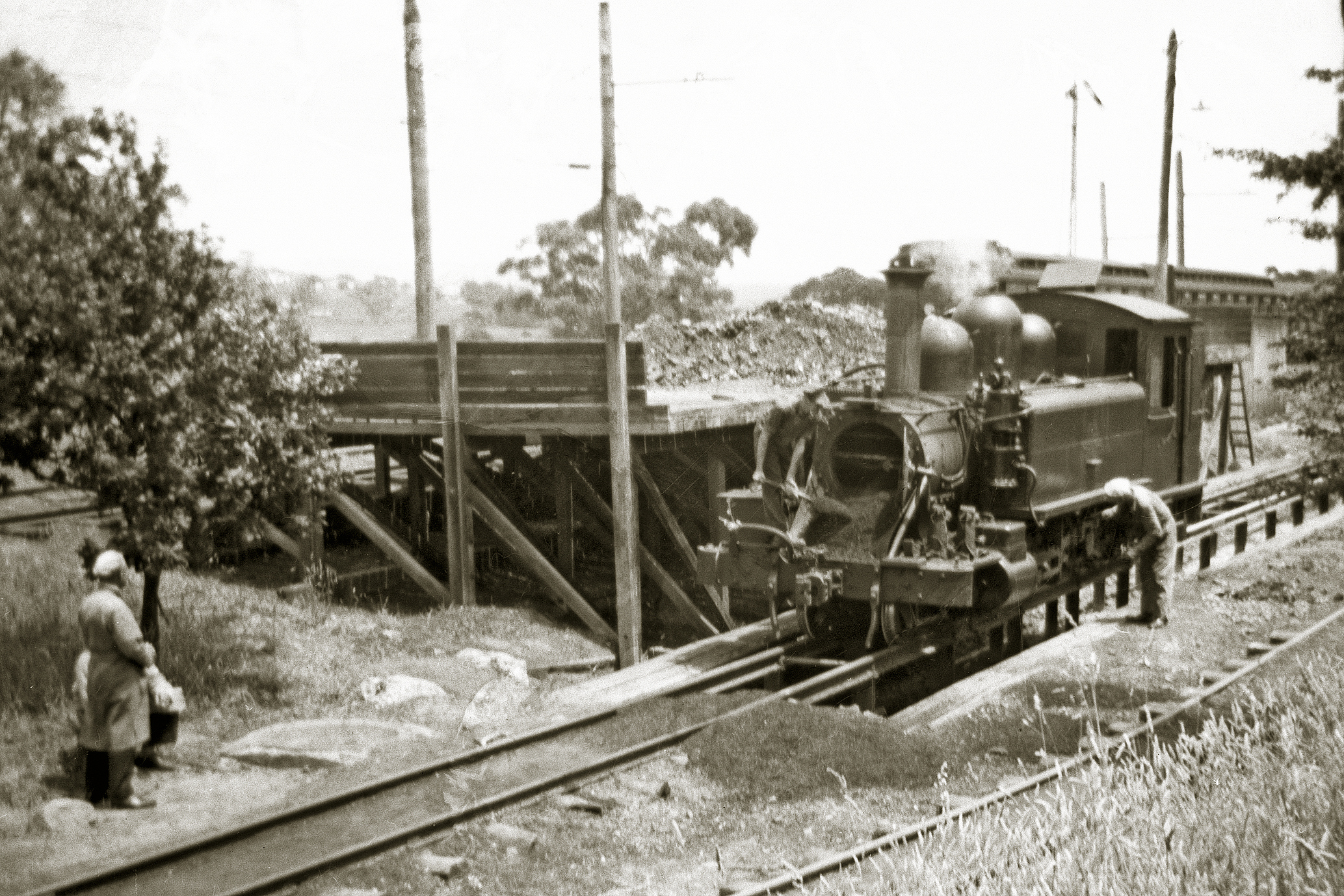
Upper Ferntree Gully coal stage, narrow gauge side, at up end of station, with engine 3A having its smokebox cleared out. The engine is identified by the plates missing (given the era) and the scar along the tankside from when it derailed in the mid 1900s.

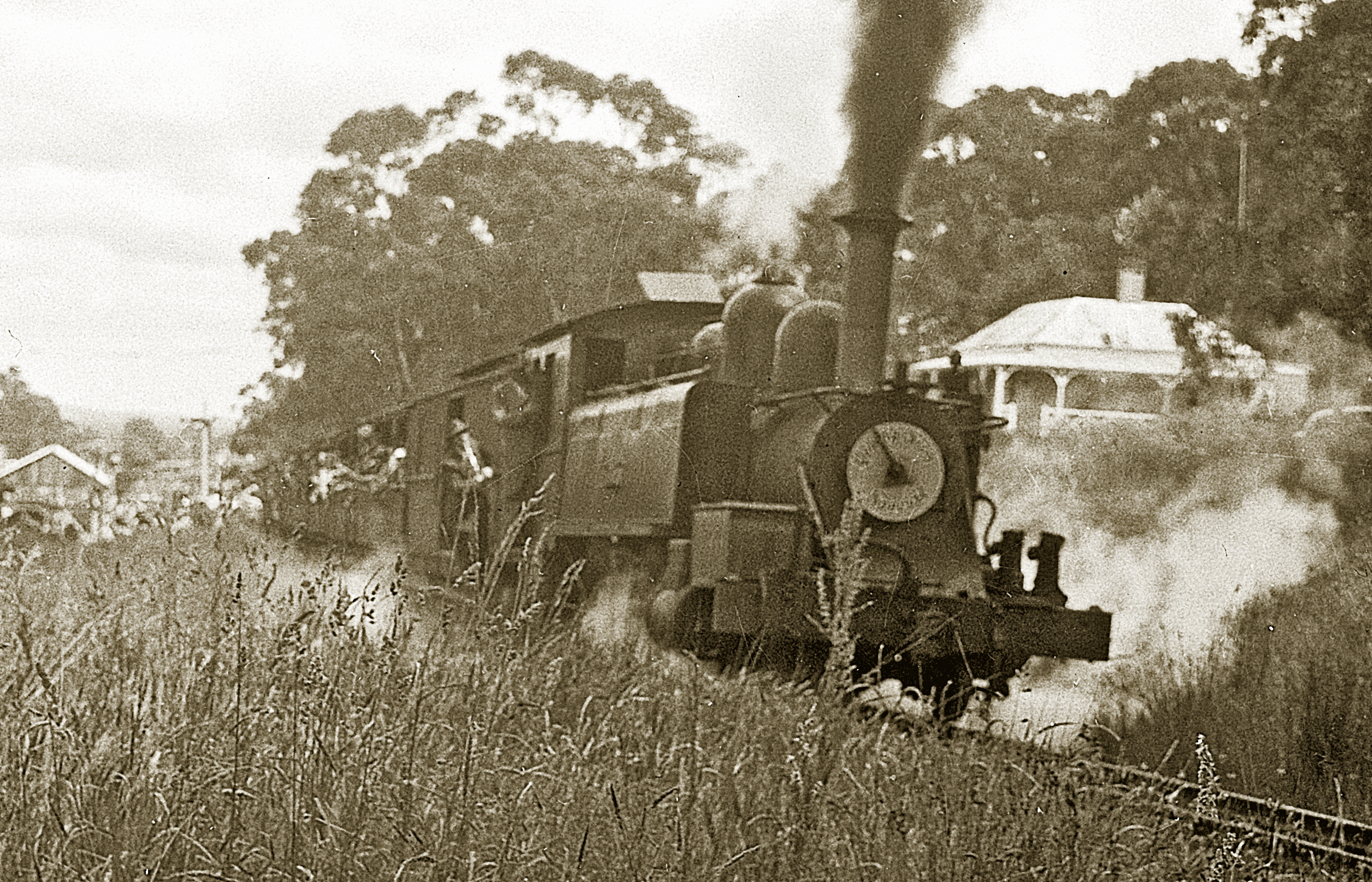
Engine 3A on one of the Young Sun specials

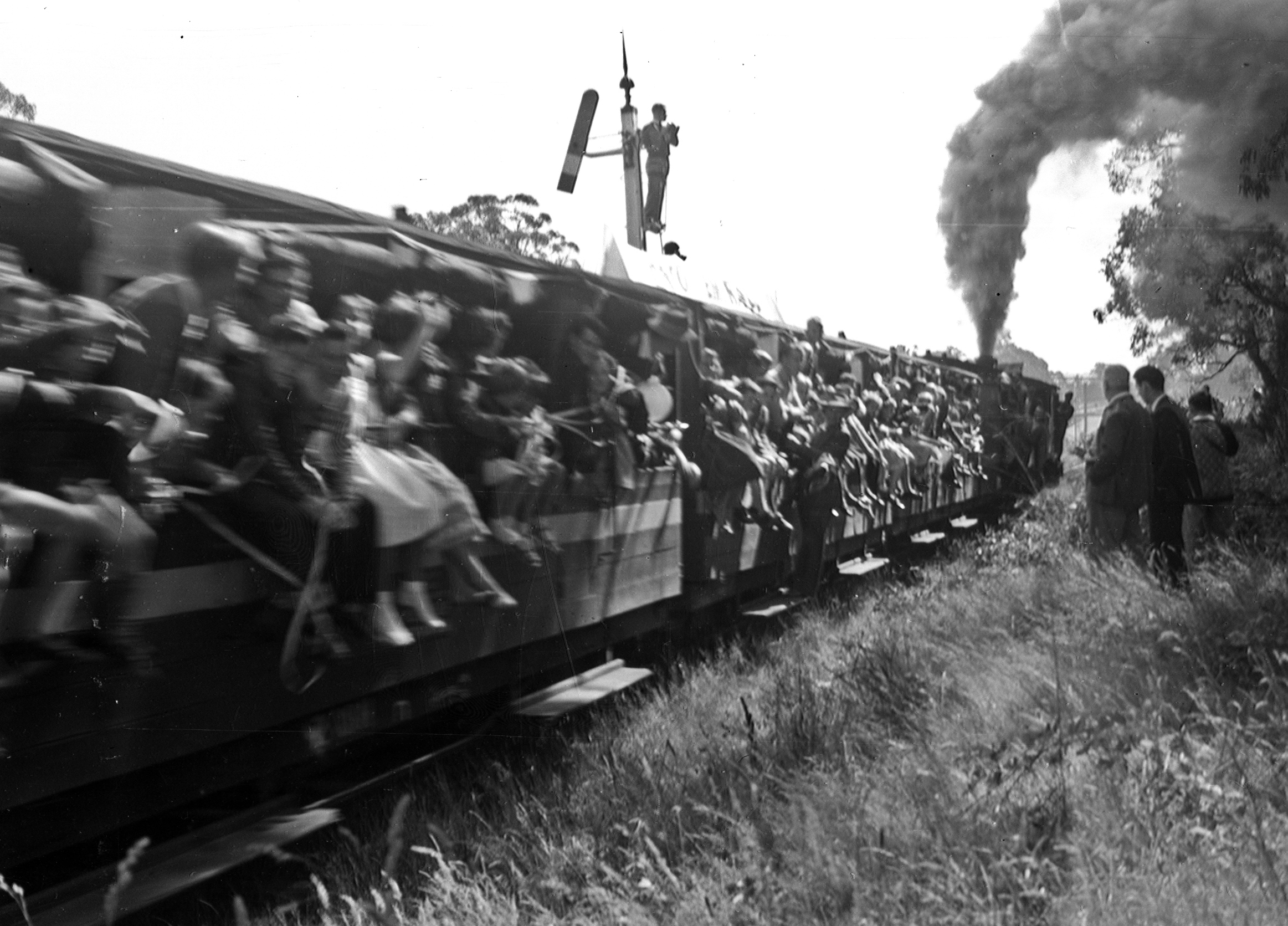
Tourist train arriving Upper Ferntree Gully, February 1958.

== Preservation ==
Following closure, a few farewell specials operated on the remaining usable section to Belgrave, and these proved very popular. On 1 October 1955, the Puffing Billy Preservation Society was formed by Harold Hewett to keep the railway running indefinitely. They operated trains to Belgrave until 1958 when services again ceased for conversion to a broad-gauge, electrified suburban line. The society started work on restoring the Belgrave to Lakeside section. Rover Scouts attending the 7th World Rover Moot held at Wonga Park assisted in the clearing of the line between Belgrave and Menzies Creek as part of the event's community service component. On 28 July 1962 trains resumed running between Belgrave and Menzies Creek.

Operations were extended over the remainder of the original line, opening to Emerald on 31 July 1965 and Lakeside on 18 October 1975 before reaching Gembrook, which was opened on 18 October 1998. The first trains to Gembrook carried children from the primary schools along the Belgrave–Gembrook corridor, two of which directly adjoin the railway and the remainder not more than a street away.

== See also ==
- Narrow gauge lines of the Victorian Railways
