= Selby railway station, Melbourne =

Railway station in Victoria, Australia

Selby
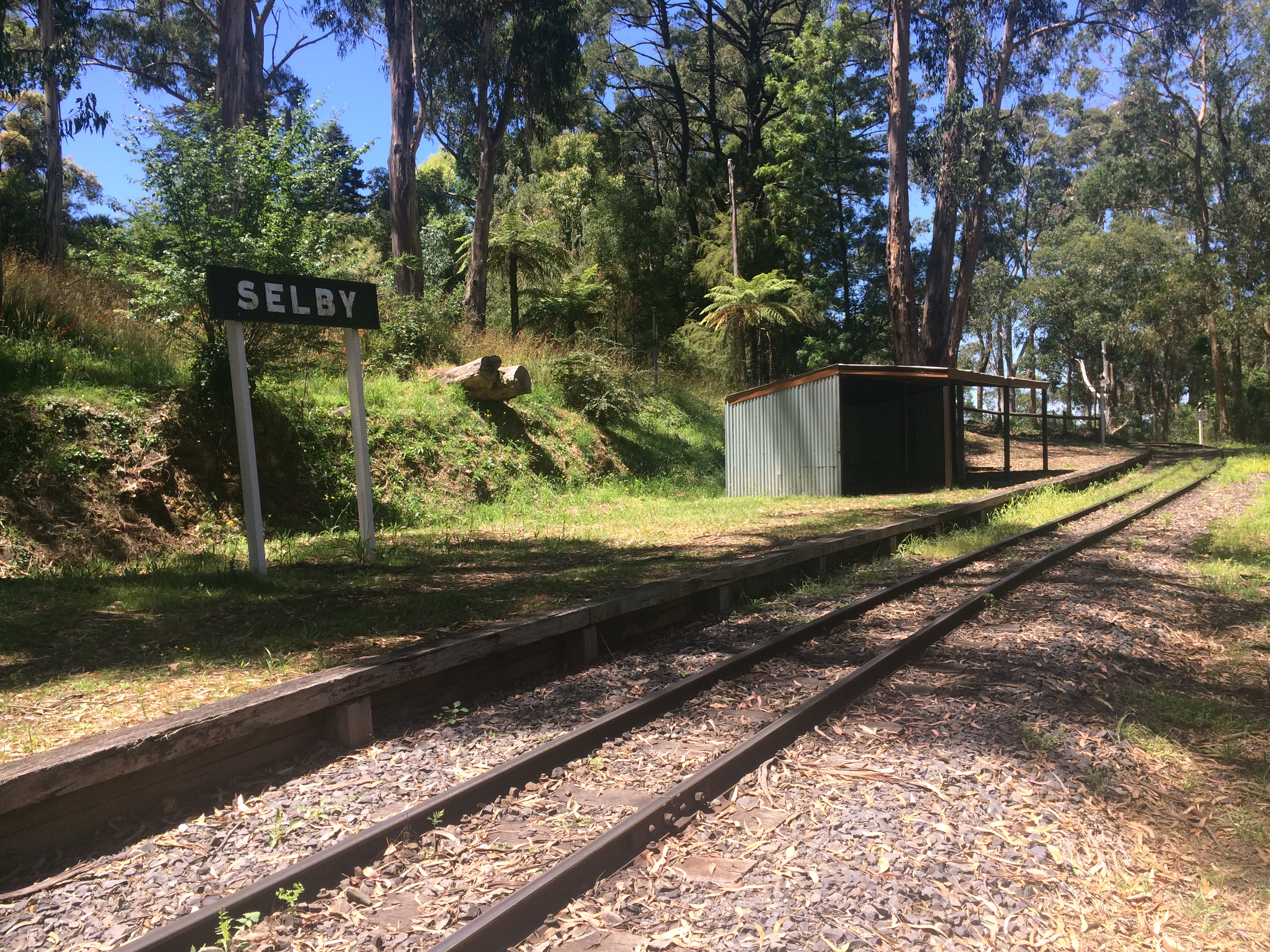
- Selby station and platform, January 2022.

General information
- Location: Selby VIC 3159; Australia
- Coordinates: 37°54′53″S 145°22′11″E
- Elevation: 230 m (755 ft)
- System: Puffing Billy Railway station
- Lines: Puffing Billy Railway; Gembrook (former)
- Distance: 43.98 km (27.33 mi) from Flinders Street
- Platforms: 1
- Tracks: 1

Other information
- Status: Unstaffed

History
- Opened: 19 March 1904; 122 years ago

Services
Preceding station	Puffing Billy Railway	Following station
Belgrave Terminus	Gembrook line	Menzies Creek towards Gembrook
Former services
Preceding station	VicRail	Following station
Belgrave towards Upper Ferntree Gully	Gembrook line	Menzies Creek towards Gembrook
List of closed railway stations in Melbourne
Location

Selby railway station is a narrow-gauge tourist heritage railway station operated by the Puffing Billy Railway in the outer eastern suburbs of Melbourne, Victoria, Australia. It opened on 19 March, 1904 as a minor stop on the Gembrook line. After the line's closure on 30 April, 1954, Selby reopened to passengers under the Puffing Billy on 21 July, 1962. It now consists of a short platform and corrugated iron waiting shelter. Trains usually do not stop in Selby but can if required.

== Description ==
Selby station is located in Selby, an outer eastern suburb of Melbourne, Australia, on its border with neighbouring suburb Belgrave. It is a short, steep walk downhill from Selby's central village and the Selby General Store on Belgrave–Gembrook Road. The station is one of few in Victoria not belonging to VicTrack. Instead, it is owned and operated by the Puffing Billy Railway Board, and is serviced by heritage steam locomotives on the Puffing Billy Railway. Selby is the second stop on the line, lying between Menzies Creek (down-line towards Gembrook) and the terminus in Belgrave.

Selby station, July 2023

Selby has a single side platform accommodating the single track passing through it. The contemporary platform surface is dirt, sometimes covered by grass or tree debris, with wooden edges maintaining separation from the tracks. A simple corrugated iron waiting shelter with wooden supports is in the centre of the platform, with wooden benches inside and a verandah cover projecting into the platform in front of it. The sign at the up end of the platform reads 'Selby'. The station is relatively inaccessible; the primary pedestrian access route to the platform is via a steep dirt path, which also leads to the pedestrian crossing over the tracks.

== History ==
The Gembrook line ran through the eventual site of Selby station when it initially opened on 18 December, 1900. By 1904, there was demand for a new stopping place in the area then called 'McMahons'. There was some debate over the new station's name, with many residents suggesting 'Black Hill' after a local topographical landmark. The Shire council and railway trust both proposed the name 'Selby's Siding' or simply 'Selby' after George W. Selby, a local landowner, retired councilor, and first chairman of the Ferntree Gully and Gembrook Railway Construction Trust, to whom the successful construction of the railway was partly credited. Selby opened and received a train for the first time on 19 March, 1904.

When it opened, the station consisted of a corrugated iron shelter shed incorporating a small office and parcels room. By the 1920s, a standard prefabricated portable building was added to address additional demand. Neither structure remains, with the contemporary shelter shed lacking the original's office room.

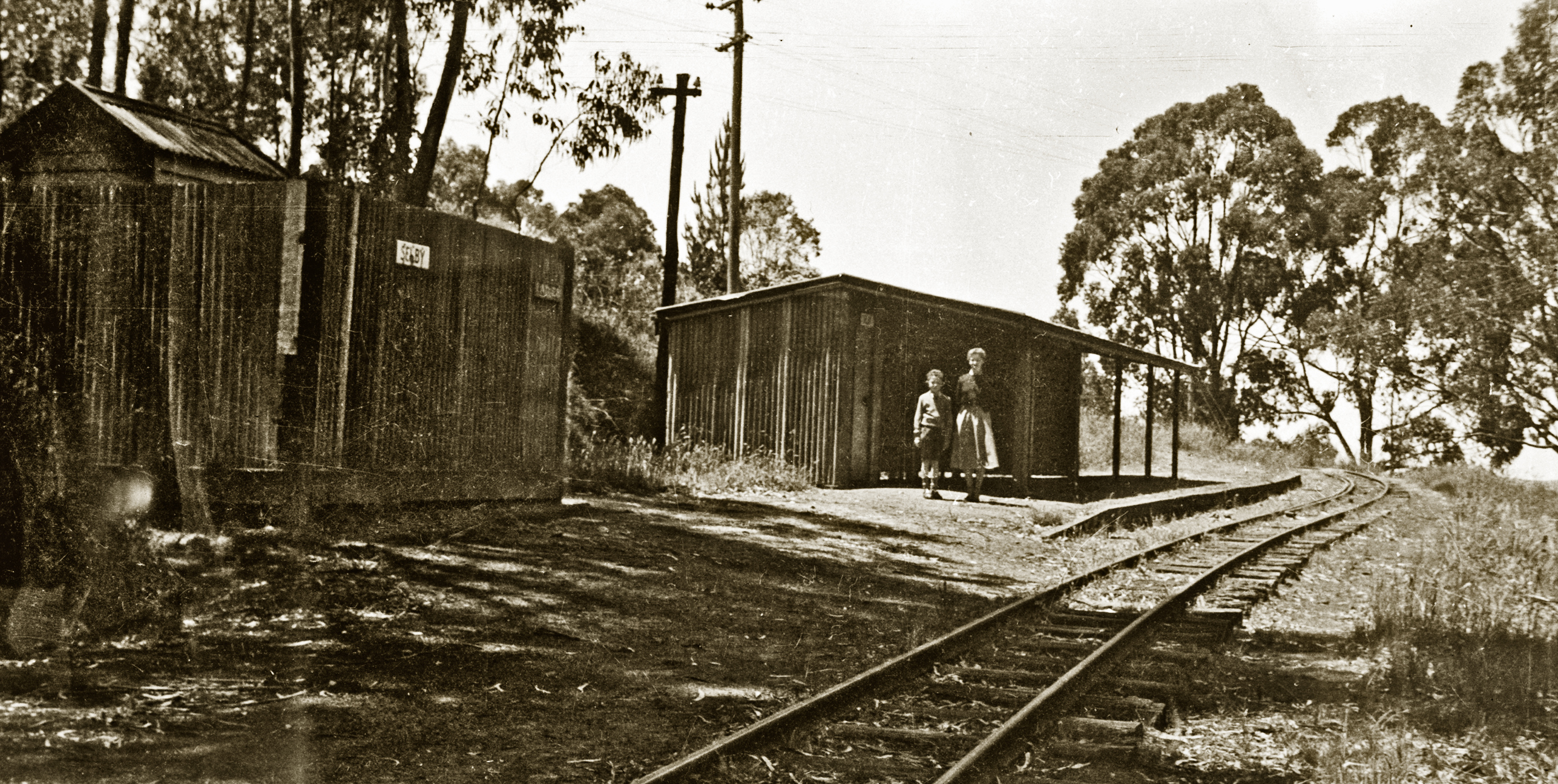
Selby station c. 1953-54; therefore shortly before the line's closure.

The station was subject to several problems, complains, and disputes through its operation. Within a year of its opening, residents of the Selby village complained that the railway department refused to deposit goods at Selby, despite it allegedly being "the place made for the purpose." The site chosen for the station proved more problematic, with several proposals made through the 1910s to relocate Selby station to "a more suitable site," on account of its steep grade and "impassable" roads. These proposals transformed into a heated debate by 1920 and 1921, as the Fern Tree Gully Shire Council proposed the removal of Selby station to a new site approximately 280 metres east ("14 chains eastward") to facilitate the construction of a goods siding at the new station. The debate generated many newspaper articles, alternate propositions, and public meetings, with many opposing the relocation in protest of their station's removal or on the basis of expense. The relocation never occurred, and the goods siding was never built.

The railway contributed significantly to the growth of Selby as a settlement through the 1910s and 20s. Land began to be subdivided around the present township from 1911, and by 1920 Selby was, according to The Dandenong Advertiser, "evidently coming into prominence as a holiday resort" with "every available train being packed to its utmost capacity" and land selling rapidly around the station. In 1919, Selby recorded 568 visiting passengers travelling outwards from the city—less than most of its fellow stations, but still notable for the smaller settlement. The Selby store was positioned at the station through its early existence, but relocated to the main road and village centre in 1922. By 1923, Selby was particularly popular with weekend travelers—moreso than Belgrave—and hosted many weekend cottages. By the end of the 1920s, outward passenger numbers had declined.

By the 1950s, the Gembrook line was causing continuous and growing financial losses, and had been unable to increase profits from post-war tourism. In 1953, a major landslide occurred between Selby and Menzies Creek station, finally bringing about the line's closure in April 1954. While trains from Upper Ferntree Gully to Belgrave resumed by 1955, Selby—one stop further, and on the Belgrave side of the landslip—remained closed. Instead, Selby station reopened to passenger traffic on 21 July, 1962, when the line from Belgrave to Menzies Creek was reopened as the Puffing Billy Railway. In the intervening years, Selby received a new shelter shed, a result either of the work of volunteers from the Puffing Billy Preservation Society or of the Citizen Military Forces' engineer's assistance in reopening the line, as announced in July 1959.

Selby station c. 1962, as a train arrives; therefore shortly after the station's reopening.

In October 1977, Selby station—with the rest of the line—was transferred to the ownership of the Emerald Tourist Railway Board, which in 2022 became the Puffing Billy Railway Board.

== Platforms and services ==
Selby has one platform. It is served by the Puffing Billy Railway, a heritage railway running steam locomotives as a tourist service. In ordinary circumstances, Puffing Billy tickets passing Selby can only be purchased as return journeys departing from and returning to Belgrave. As a tourist line, tickets are significantly more expensive than commuter public transit, and must be purchased in advance. The train does not typically stop at Selby, although this occasionally occurs in special circumstances and may be arrangeable.

== Transport links ==
The Charles St/Belgrave-Gembrook Road bus stop a short walk from Selby station is serviced by one route operated by Ventura Bus Lines, under contract to Public Transport Victoria:

- 695 : Belgrave – Gembrook
