= Menzies Creek railway station =

Railway station in Victoria, Australia

Menzies Creek
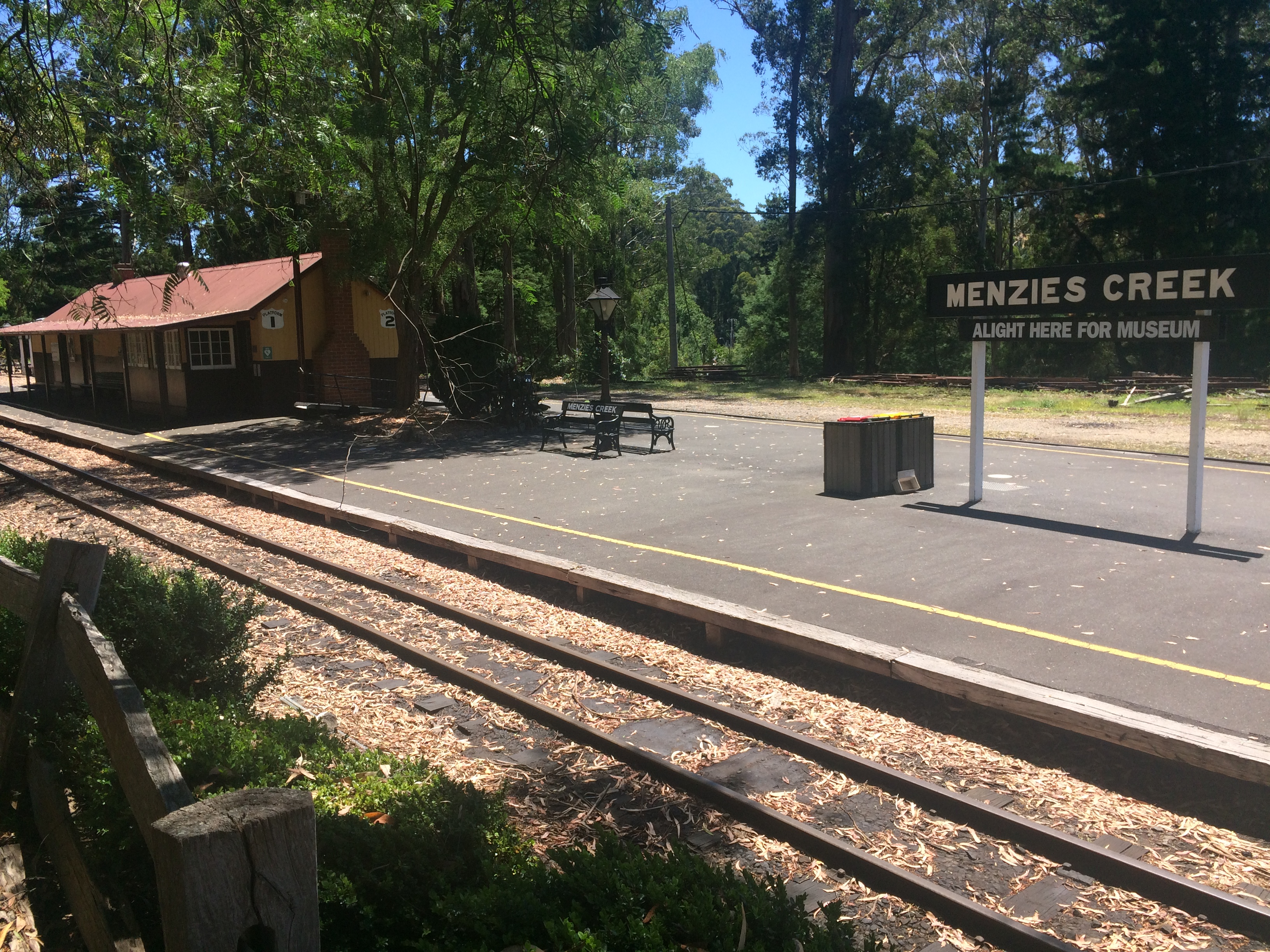
- Menzies Creek station and platform, January 2022.

General information
- Coordinates: 37.92071°S 145.40560°E
- Lines: Puffing Billy Railway; Gembrook railway line (former)
- Distance: 47.76 km (29.68 mi) from Flinders Street
- Platforms: 2
- Tracks: 3

Other information
- Status: Staffed

History
- Opened: 1900
- Closed: 1954
- Rebuilt: 1962
- Former names: Aura

Services
Preceding station	Puffing Billy Railway	Following station
Selby towards Belgrave	Gembrook line	Clematis towards Gembrook
Location

Menzies Creek railway station, formerly known as Aura railway station, is located on the Puffing Billy Railway in the town of the same name.

== History ==
It was opened with the line on 18 December 1900. It was named after an early settler John Menzies. On 5 December 1904 it was renamed Aura, after the estate of the Shire President. The station reverted to its previous name on 4 July 1947. Throughout this period, the Post Office kept the name of the town as Menzies Creek which it remains to this day.

When the station was operating under the Victorian Railways it had a loop siding, a standard portable station building, and a goods shed. As the original station building had long been demolished, a replacement building of reclaimed Victorian Railways' "portables" was built in the 1980s. In 1990 the station buildings was moved to its current position as an island platform during a construction exercise undertaken by combat engineers of the 7th Field Engineer Regiment (Australian Army Reserve).

== Platforms and layout ==
Menzies Creek has an island crossing platform with a track on each side (1 and 2 Road), a loop siding (3 Road) where Goods wagons are stored. And a Undergear Inspection track, leading onto a headshunt ('A' Siding) to the Museum Siding. 3 Road and 'A' Siding points are manually operated by McKenzie and Holland Small Point Levers, both of which are Annett locked.

== Facilities ==
The station now is home to the Aura Tearooms, and Puffing Billy Narrow Gauge Museum.

== Gallery ==
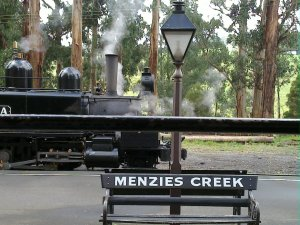
Station platform with "Menzies Creek" bench

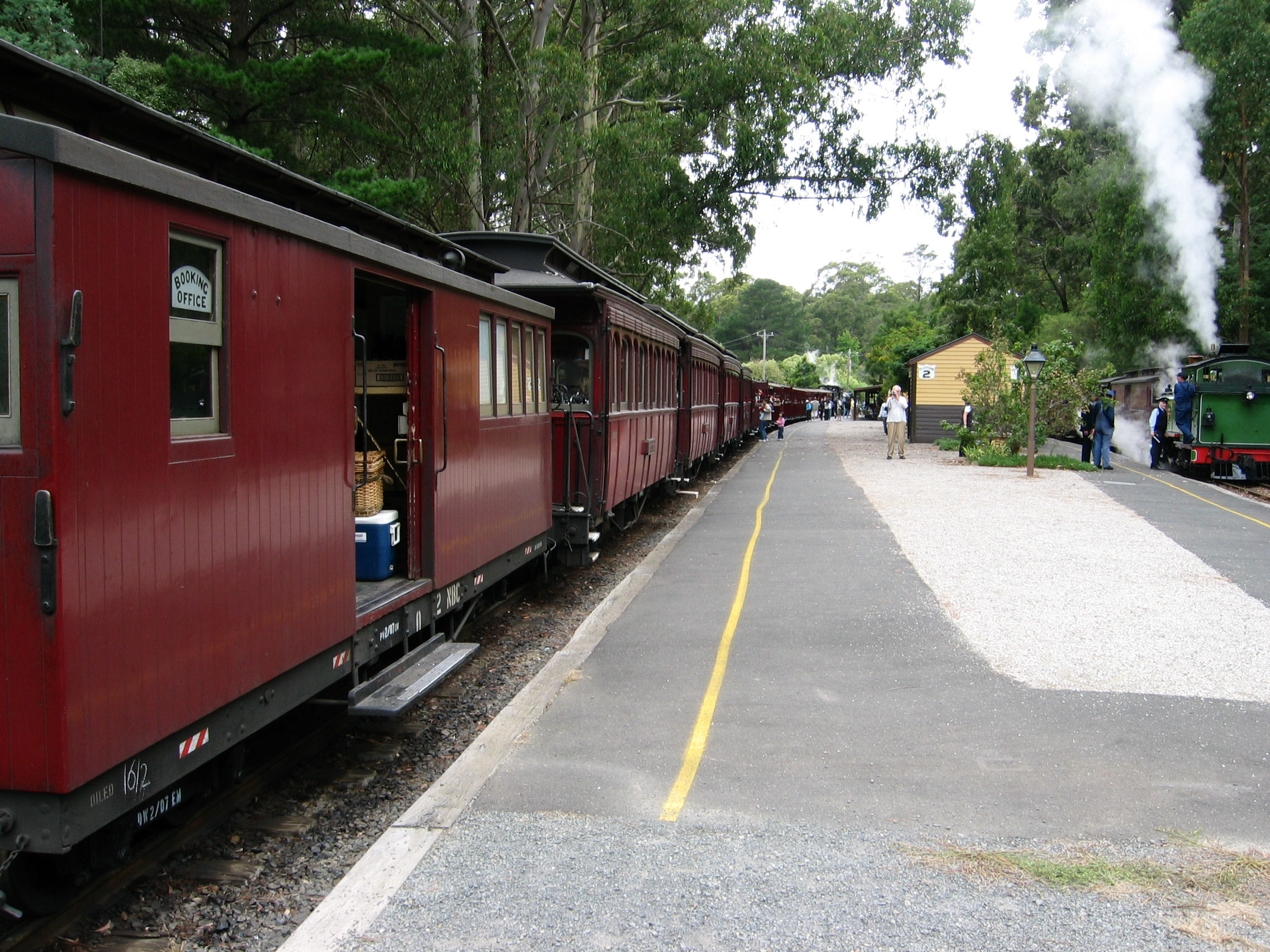
Trains cross at the station
