= G42 =

G42, G-42 or G.42 may refer to:

- BMW 2 Series (G42), the second generation of the BMW subcompact executive coupé
- HMS Lincoln (G42), a United Kingdom Royal Navy destroyer
- SMS G42, an Imperial German Navy torpedo boat
- G42 Shanghai–Chengdu Expressway in China
- Victorian Railways G class locomotive number
- Glock 42 pistol
- G42 (company), an Emirati artificial intelligence company
