= Victorian Railways NA class =

Class of Australian locomotives

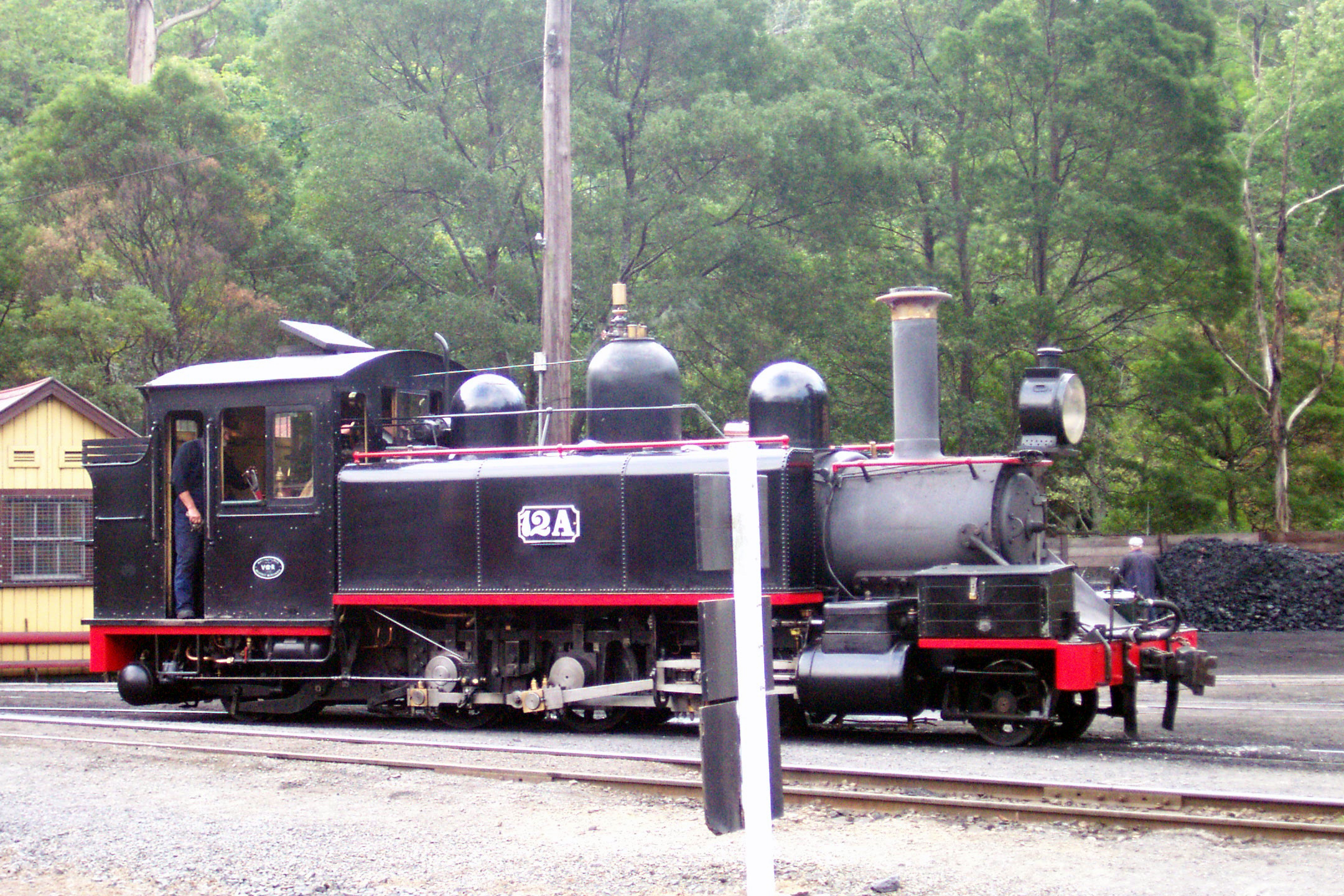
- NA locomotive 12A at Belgrave on the Puffing Billy Railway 2005.
Type and origin
- Power type: Steam
- Designer: Baldwin Locomotive Works
- Builder: Baldwin Locomotive Works (2); VR Newport Workshops (15)
- Model: BLW simple: 10-20¼-D1; BLW compound: 10-13-26¼-D1 (Note: BLW compound should have been 13-24¼-D1-24)
- Build date: 1898–1915
- Total produced: 17
Specifications
- Configuration
  - Whyte: 2-6-2T
  - UIC: 1′C1′ t
- Driver: 2nd coupled axle, flangeless
- Gauge: 2 ft 6 in (762 mm)
- Leading dia.: 24.25 in (0.62 m)
- Driver dia.: 36 in (0.91 m)
- Trailing dia.: 24.25 in (0.62 m)
- Minimum curve: 3 chains (60.35 m)
- Wheelbase
  - Engine: 21 ft 10 in (6.65 m)
- Length
  - Over couplers: 30 ft 10 in (9.40 m)
- Width: 8 ft 3 in (2.51 m)
- Height: 10 ft 10 in (3.30 m)
- Frame type: Bar frames
- Axle load: 1: 9.455 long tons (9.607 t; 10.590 short tons); 2: 9.3 long tons (9.4 t; 10.4 short tons)
- Adhesive weight: 1: 25.65 long tons (26.06 t; 28.73 short tons); 2: 25.95 long tons (26.37 t; 29.06 short tons)
- Empty weight: 1: 27.9 long tons (28.3 t; 31.2 short tons); 2: 28.45 long tons (28.91 t; 31.86 short tons)
- Loco weight: 1: 34.35 long tons (34.90 t; 38.47 short tons); 2: 34.9 long tons (35.5 t; 39.1 short tons)
- Fuel type: Coal
- Fuel capacity: Initially 1.5 long tons (1,524.07 kg), later 1.75 long tons (1,778.08 kg) then 2 long tons (2,032.09 kg) with hungry boards.
- Water cap.: Initially 600 US gal (2,271.25 L), later 750 US gal (2,839.06 L) or 780 US gal (2,952.62 L)
- Firebox
  - Type: Round-top
- Boiler
  - Type: Parallel
- Boiler pressure: 1 only: 160 psi (1.10 MPa); 2-17: 180 psi (1.24 MPa)
- Heating surface
  - Firebox: 9.03 ft^{2} (0.8 m^{2})
  - Total surface: 524 ft^{2} (48.7 m^{2})
- Cylinders: 2
- Cylinder size: 1, 3, 5-17: 13 in × 18 in (330 mm × 457 mm)
- High-pressure cylinder: 2 & 4: 9 1/2 in × 18 in (241 mm × 457 mm)
- Low-pressure cylinder: 2 & 4: 16 in × 18 in (406 mm × 457 mm)
Performance figures
- Tractive effort: 1: 10,816 lbf (48.1 kN); 2: 12,168 lbf (54.1 kN); 3-17: 12,170 lbf (54.1 kN) at 80% of boiler pressure
Career
- Delivered: 1898
- First run: September 1898
- Preserved: 3A, 6A, 7A, 8A, 12A, 14A
- Current owner: Puffing Billy Railway
- Disposition: 6 preserved, 11 scrapped
- All data above from Speed Limit 20 Plus unless otherwise marked.

The Victorian Railways NA class is a 2-6-2T built for their four 2 ft 6 in (762 mm) gauge branch lines.

== History ==
In the mid-1890s the Victorian Railways were considering construction of narrow gauge railways around the state in order to reduce construction costs. These were originally intended to be built to a gauge of 2 ft (610 mm), and quotations were obtained from an assortment of British locomotive engineering companies who advised delivery times of 11 to 18 months. Before construction had started the specification changed to 2 ft 6 in (762 mm), and the Baldwin Locomotive Works in the United States was awarded a tender for two engines to be supplied at a cost of £3,880 supplied the first two 2-6-2Ts, as well as a range of spare parts. The engines were a new design for Baldwin, based on prior work but with enough changes that whole new drawings were necessary.

These two engines were delivered on the Amana in August 1898, and numbered 1A and 2A. Both were placed in service for construction of the Wangaratta to Whitfield line in the North East of Victoria in September 1898. Correspondence originally referred to the engines as "Narrow Gauge A" class; this later changed to "^{N}A", although with a few exceptions in the early preservation era this code was never reflected on the engines themselves. The spare parts from the Baldwin Locomotive Works were used to construct locomotives 3A and 4A at Newport Workshops in 1900 for the Upper Ferntree Gully to Gembrook Line, with further examples of the class entering service up to the last, number 17A, in 1915. Engines 2 and 4 used Vauclain compound high- and low-pressure cylinders, while the rest of the class used simple expansion cylinders.

== Details ==
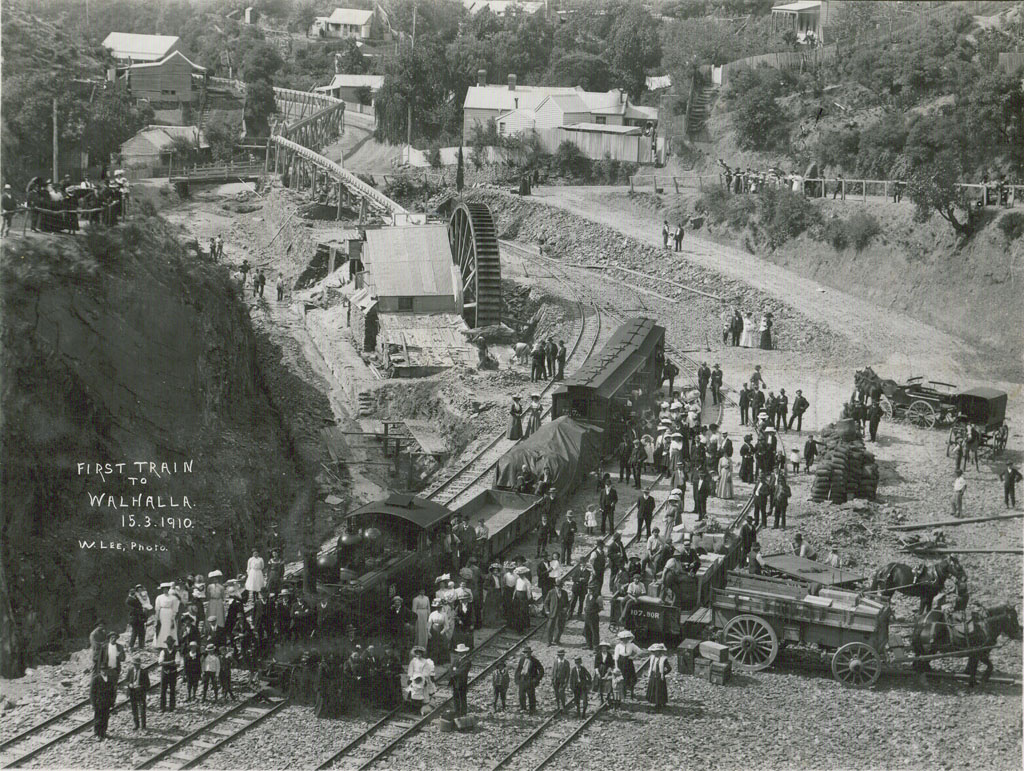
9A at Walhalla in 1910

The engines brought with them the full range of Baldwin standard design features, including a fully-enclosed cab with side doors, sliding windows on the sides, hinged windows on the front, smaller windows at the rear above the coal bunker, and a roof ventilator; but the cabs were small enough that a different type of shovel was needed for the fireman, smaller than the usual type.

The boiler and firebox were lagged (insulated) with magnesia sections, and the outer boiler shell was steel with brass boiler bands. The small cab necessitated use of a 12 in (30 cm) shovel blade, in lieu of the normal 18 in (46 cm) shovel blade. Thus, the average shovelfull of coal was reduced from 10 lb (4.5 kg) to only 5.5 lb (2.5 kg), and the engines required around 3.5 to 5 scoops of coal per minute. The small firebox grate resulted in a significant quantity of coal passing through the firebox unburnt, being ejected as cinders.

The saturated (unsuperheated) steam at 180 psi (1,200 kPa) reached temperatures of 379 °F (193 °C), but by the time the steam had reached the cylinders the temperature would have dropped by at least 120 °F (49 °C), with some water condensing in the system. In the Compound engine design the loss was only around 75 °F (24 °C). The engines were also less likely to pull cinders from the firebox through the chimney when working hard.

Above the boiler were dual sand domes either side of the central steam dome, pop-type safety valves. The boiler was fed by a pair of Sellers "Monitor" injectors, which drew from the side tanks. On the original engines the tanks had a capacity of 600 US gal (2,271.25 L) total, but this was later increased to 780 US gal (2,952.62 L). It is not clear whether 3A and 4A started with lower-capacity tanks or not. (Note: The engine card for locomotive 4A shows a tank capacity of 750 US gal (2,839.06 L).) These were the first Victorian engines fitted with double blast pipes of 2 in (51 mm) diameter, excepting 8A (and possibly 12A) which had a single 3.1 in (79 mm) diameter blast pipe.

The engines used outside bar frames with extended axles for the wheel cranks, Stephenson's valve gear between the frames, and for the Simple engines, actuated flat D valves above the cylinders actuated by rocker arms. To work around sharp curves the centre driving wheels were flangeless, and the five axles were grouped in two sets of compensated springs (leading two, rear three). The front and rear trucks had side movement controlled by a system of levers, and the leading and trailing wheels were of a wrought iron spoked design. Additionally, the engine cabs had a roof ventilator, a horizontal throttle arm set up for right-hand-drive (the inverse of normal Victorian practice), and a hand reverse lever. They were fitted with large wooden cowcatchers at each end, extending some distance beyond the couplers. The extended smokeboxes featured horizontal-grid spark arrestors and high blast pipes. Steam admission to gauges, the Westinghouse pump and the cylinders was controlled through a Nathan pattern sightfeed displacement type lubricator, mounted above the firebox. There was also a steam manifold that fed auxiliary systems like the compressor and the pair of Friedmann Minotr no.5 live steam injectors.

Engines 1A and 2A were delivered to Victoria in 1898 with Baldwin builders numbers 15936 and 15937 displayed on the sides of the smokebox. Engine 2A also featured plates on the cylinders indicating adoption of the Vauclain patent design. The two engines were built for and delivered to the Wangaratta to Whitfield railway, with 1A being used on construction trains from 1 September 1898 and 2A following shortly before the line opened. The following engines 3A and 4A were built at Newport Workshops in 1900 for use on the Upper Ferntree Gully to Gembrook line, with their construction using parts provided by Baldwin as spares for the earlier two locomotives. These engines were copies of 1A and 2A respectively, except that they featured higher water tanks for increased capacity and large oil lamps at each end for night running; both these features became standard elements for the class later on.

Engines 5A to 17A were built at Newport Workshops over the following sixteen years, with the final unit entering service on 4 April 1916. Each of these engines were identical to 3A, which had been built with a 180psi boiler, and in 1915 engine 1A was certified to operate at the higher pressure. The Newport-built locomotives all had cabside builders plates.

In 1920 parts were made for two more NAs — 18A and 19A — but due to a downturn in traffic the order was cancelled, and the parts were used as spares on the other NAs. By the mid-1920s these small locomotives were not able to handle the increasing traffic, and two G class Garratt locomotives were purchased to supplement the fleet on the heavily patronized Walhalla and Beech Forest Lines.

The locomotives weigh 36.58 long tons (37.17 t; 40.97 short tons) and produce a tractive effort of 12,170 lbf (54.1 kN), allowing them to haul loads of 90 long tons (91 t; 100 short tons) up grades of 1 in 30 (3.33%). Numbers 6A, 7A, 8A, 12A, and 14A have been restored and operate on the Puffing Billy Railway, and 3A is also on the Puffing Billy Railway, currently plinthed in a dismantled state in the Lakeside Discovery Centre. The remaining locomotives have all been scrapped.

Cave et al. claims that engine 2A was later converted from the Vauclain compound system to a simple expansion cylinder arrangement, but there is no evidence to back up the claim. The other Victorian compound engines, the broad gauge V class, were converted.

=== Design Alterations ===
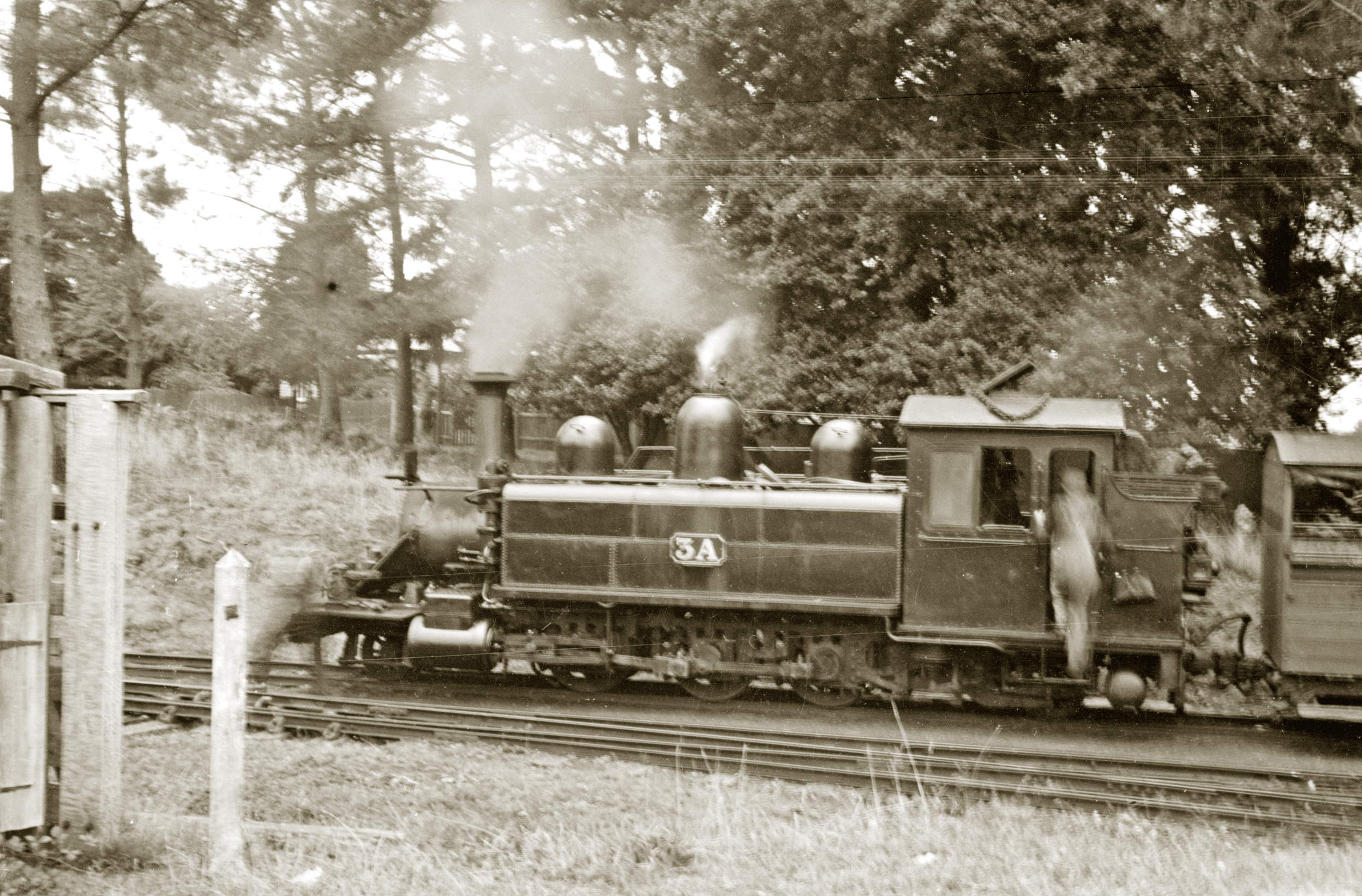
3A at Emerald c.1940s; note scar alongside the water tank.

Following 1A and 2A, engines 3-5 (and possibly 6) had large wooden cowcatchers fitted, which were replaced with shorter steel pilots each end around 1904. In late 2024 6A was restored to service with a wooden cowcatcher similar in style to the originals, but retaining its automatic couplers; an extension block was fitted between the frame and the coupler to give sufficient clearance to adjacent vehicles.

Cave et al. (2002) says that engines 1A and 3A were delivered with the air compressor pumps fitted ahead of the driver-side tank, while 2A and 4A to 17A had these on the fireman-side tank, with 1A and 3A later modified to match. Speed Limit 20 Plus (2017) says that 1A had the air pump fitted inside the fireman's side of the cab, but this was later moved to the front of the fireman-side tank and that position was made standard on later engines. Additionally, there is an early photo of engine 3A with the air pump on either side of the front of the tanks; the consensus is that the photo was mirror-flipped and that the correct position was always the fireman-side, not the driver-side tank.

The weight distribution of 1A was originally of concern to the Victorian Railways, with only 2.55 long tons (2.59 t; 2.86 short tons) on the leading axle; the weight was later redistributed to 3.75 long tons (3.81 t; 4.20 short tons). The locomotive history card for engine 2A shows alternate leading axle box sizes of 4 in × 6.5 in (102 mm × 165 mm) compared to the rest of the class, which featured 4 in × 7 in (102 mm × 178 mm) journals for both the leading and trailing axles.

The class NA was in use by 1904, though with some brief exceptions in the early preservation era this was never reflected on the engine number plates.

The two Baldwin and first five Newport locomotives had been fitted with self-cleaning systems in the smokeboxes, with ash removal via covers either side of the smokebox; the front of the smokebox was sealed with ten clamps. The Baldwin engines did not have smoke box ash ejectors.

The first seven engines were not fitted with speed recorders when they entered service, but two significant derailments caused by overspeed - the first on the Beech Forest line on 10 October 1904, which resulted in engine 3A rolling on its side and needing a complete rebuild, and the second of engine 4A near Belgrave on 28 January 1906, which resulted in 40 passenger injuries - made the fitting necessary. Initially, speed recorders were fitted under the cabs, and these were later replaced with Flaman speed recorders mounted in the cabs behind the crews. These latter recorders were operated by a shaft and bevelled gears linked to the connecting rods of the wheel closest to the driver's position. The equipment was oiled weekly, and drivers were required to confirm each trip that the recorder was measuring accurately based on the times between mile posts; one example given was that a speed of 20 mph (32 km/h) between two mileposts should take three minutes. Drivers had to sign the speed recorder's paper roll at the start of every single trip (e.g. twice on return trips), and on the Narrow Gauge every trip's chart was forwarded separately to the Superintendent of Goods Train Service.

On entry to service the earliest engines had a toolbox provided under the smokebox door, but this was later moved to the front of the driver's side cylinder. The original design had the smokebox door secured by a series of clamps, with ports either side of the smokebox used for cleaning the spark arrestor grids. However, recommendations from the Royal Commission on Locomotive Spark Arrestors in 1902 led to the provision of the two-handle screw dart system for the smokebox door in lieu of the side ports; and an ash chute was provided later to protect the exposed leading bogie axle during smokebox emptying.

On 16 March 1925 engine 8A was delivered to Newport Workshops, and over the next three weeks it was modified to use a then-experimental new exhaust system; the external difference being a new, tapered stovepipe style chimney. This modification, known as the Illinois Central design, proved successful though not particularly valuable on smaller engines, and proved a useful lesson in advance of the 1930s program to fit Modified Front Ends to the Victorian Railways' broad gauge fleet of mainline steam locomotives. Drawings from March 1926 describe the alteration as including the blastpipe lowered to 11.5 in (29 cm) above the base of the smokebox, with a 3.25 in (8.3 cm) cap inside a 12.5 in (32 cm) high tapered mesh cone under the chimney. The spark arresting grills and baffles were altered. The new chimney was 3 ft 2 in (97 cm), 9.75 in (24.8 cm) at the base and 13 in (33 cm) at the top, with a decorative ring rivetted on. 9A and 12A were also fitted with new chimneys, in 1947 and 1948 respectively, but this was not correlated with internal design alterations. 6A was fitted with a similar system in preservation, but without external changes to preserve its outward heritage appearance. The equipment was fitted between 2001 and 2017, then moved over to 14A as detailed below.

The two Garratt locomotives introduced in 1926 generally provided about twice the haulage power of the NA engines, and had to be fitted with stronger couplers in lieu of chopper couplers, so the rolling stock had to be upgraded to suit. This was around the same time that the goods fleet codes were simplified, e.g. ^{N}M^{M} to NM for cattle wagons. The two Baldwin engines were not fitted with the upgraded couplers. As of June 1924 the intent was to make use of a predecessor to the c.1930s standard Russian Willison couplers, but the supplier was unable to deliver and so the following year automatic M.C.B. coupler equipment was ordered.

In preparation for the delivery of the Garratt locomotives all stock on the Colac-Crowes and Moe-Walhalla lines was prioritised for upgrade, at a rate of about sixteen vehicles at Newport Workshops per week, in parallel with normal maintenance requirements. Because the stock was required in service and could not be stored pending a complete line conversion, a transition coupler was developed with a thicker shank to enable trains of combinations of various coupler types to operate in the interim. Those two lines' fleets were completed by the end of 1926, with the rest of the fleet (except engines 1A and 2A at Whitfield) upgraded over the following years. With the original chopper couplers the brake pipes between wagons ran diagonally below the connected couplers, but for clearance reasons the pipe connection was rerouted to above the couplers.

Removal of the chopper couplers made double-heading of NA locomotives viable, and a trial was run in 1937 on the Walhalla line with the steel cowcatchers removed for clearance. When this trial was deemed successful double-heading was permitted as a rule, though initially restricted to engines 9A, 12A and 17A until the other engines were modified.

Finally, all remaining members of the class had their pilots removed from both ends and replaced with guard irons, to enable double-heading of trains on the Beech Forest and Walhalla lines.

=== Performance ===
An analysis of the performance of the NA class engines is provided in Newsrail, December 1975, with a second article in March 1976. Some data examples from those articles include;

==== Experimental data ====
Date	Engine	Load	Section	rpm (Note: Locomotive wheel rotations per minute and train speed were estimated by counting the exhaust beats.)	Final speed	Tractive effort	Power at rail	Notes
24 December 1951	8A	8 vehicles, 48 LT (49 t) (gross 82 LT (83 t))	1-in-30 approaching Upwey	123	13.2 mph (21.2 km/h)	6,700 lbf (30 kN)	235 hp (175 kW)	Engine recently ex workshops
16 April 1952	8A	10 vehicles, 75 LT (76 t) (gross 109 LT (111 t))	1-in-30 approaching Upwey	78	8.4 mph (13.5 km/h)	8,950 lbf (39.8 kN)	200 hp (150 kW)	
19 August 1972	6A	10 vehicles, 70 LT (71 t) (gross 104 LT (106 t))	Effective 1-in-40 downside Belgrave	94	10.0 mph (16.1 km/h)	6,550 lbf (29.1 kN)	175 hp (130 kW)	Cut-off 5 notches back from full gear; (Note: Full gear is 7 notches from mid gear to block.) 35 5.5 lb (2.5 kg) shovelfulls of coal in 10 minutes
17 August 1974	14A	11 vehicles, 72 LT (73 t) (gross 106 LT (108 t))	Effective 1-in-40 downside Belgrave	100	10.7 mph (17.2 km/h)	6,700 lbf (30 kN)	190 hp (140 kW)	Cut-off 5 notches back from full gear; 30 5.5 lb (2.5 kg) shovelfulls of coal in 6 minutes
4 October 1975	7A	11 vehicles, 76 LT (77 t) (gross 110 LT (110 t))	Mileposts 27–28, average 1-in-40	103	11.0 mph (17.7 km/h)	6,930 lbf (30.8 kN)	203 hp (151 kW)	Cut-off 4 notches back from full gear
4 October 1975	7A	11 vehicles, 76 LT (77 t) (gross 110 LT (110 t))	Mileposts 28-28.25, average 1-in-48	121	13.0 mph (20.9 km/h)	5,900 lbf (26 kN)	204 hp (152 kW)	Cut-off 4 notches back from full gear
4 October 1975	7A	11 vehicles, 76 LT (77 t) (gross 110 LT (110 t))	Mileposts 31.5-31.75, average 1-in-31	93	10.0 mph (16.1 km/h)	8,700 lbf (39 kN)	232 hp (173 kW)	Cut-off 3 notches back from full gear
4 October 1975	12A	5 vehicles (ballast train), 76 LT (77 t) (gross 110 LT (110 t))	Mileposts 31.5-31.75, average 1-in-31	93	10.0 mph (16.1 km/h)	8,700 lbf (39 kN)	232 hp (173 kW)	Cut-off 2 notches back from full gear
3 January 1976	6A	10 vehicles, 61 LT (62 t) (gross 95 LT (97 t))	Mileposts 27–28, average 1-in-40	102	10.9 mph (17.5 km/h)	6,000 lbf (27 kN)	175 hp (130 kW)	Cut-off 4 notches back from full gear
3 January 1976	6A	10 vehicles, 61 LT (62 t) (gross 95 LT (97 t))	Mileposts 31.5-31.75, average 1-in-31	101	10.8 mph (17.4 km/h)	7,500 lbf (33 kN)	216 hp (161 kW)	Cut-off 3 notches back from full gear
3 January 1976	6A	10 vehicles, 66 LT (67 t) (gross 100 LT (100 t))	Mileposts 33.75-32.25, average 1-in-40	110	11.8 mph (19.0 km/h)	6,300 lbf (28 kN)	198 hp (148 kW)	Cut-off 5 notches back from full gear
3 January 1976	6A	10 vehicles, 66 LT (67 t) (gross 100 LT (100 t))	Up direction approaching Menzies Creek, average 1-in-43	160	17.2 mph (27.7 km/h)	5,900 lbf (26 kN)	270 hp (200 kW)	Cut-off 5 notches back from full gear
26 January 1976	12A	10 vehicles, 66 LT (67 t) (gross 100 LT (100 t))	Mileposts 29-29.5, average 1-in-43	117	12.5 mph (20.1 km/h)	5,900 lbf (26 kN)	197 hp (147 kW)	Cut-off 5 notches back from full gear
26 January 1976	12A	10 vehicles, 66 LT (67 t) (gross 100 LT (100 t))	Mileposts 31.5-31.75, average 1-in-31	112	12.0 mph (19.3 km/h)	7,900 lbf (35 kN)	253 hp (189 kW)	Cut-off 4 notches back from full gear

The above table and figures assumed engine weights of 34 LT (35 t) (noting that the location of timing would mean the engines' coal bunkers and water tanks should be near full), and train weights based on an NBH carriage being 7 LT (7.1 t) including 32 passengers, or 5 LT (5.1 t) empty; though on quiet days the carriages might have been close to empty, and in holiday season as many as 64 passengers, many of whom were children, were known to be "jammed in". Rolling resistance was assumed as 7 lb/LT (3.1 kg/t), and air resistance at speeds below 15 mph (24 km/h) as negligible.

==== Trial sites ====
The measurements at Upwey was straight but a 1 in 30 slope, for 82 lb/LT (37 kg/t). The Belgrave measurements are between mileposts 26MP and 27MP; at the time of the article being written the Belgrave narrow gauge station had not yet been levelled, so the line was an almost constant 1 in 44 downhill with curves to equate to 1 in 40; this gave an effective additional rolling resistance of 63 lb/LT (28 kg/t).

Later test sites included a half-mile section approaching Menzies Creek, between MP30.5 and MP30, the quarter-mile 1 in 31 uphill slope for Down trains arriving at Emerald station, and the mile-long stretch from Lakeside home signal towards the crest approaching Kilvington Drive near Emerald. The latter section includes 1.8 mi (2.9 km) of uphill gradient averaging 1-in-42, but with the curvature this is treated as equivalent to at least 1-in-40, and the locomotives cannot use momentum to ascend the grade if they've started from Lakeside.

==== Results and recommendations ====
For 6A's trial at Menzies Creek on 6 January 1976, the engine arrived at the base of the gradient at 19 mph (31 km/h) and reached the top two minutes later at 17.2 mph (27.7 km/h). In that time the engine cut-off was left at 5 notches from full, but the throttle was opened from half to full. This achieved the highest recorded 270 hp (200 kW) at rail, but was not sustainable as steam consumption was faster than production and water ingress to the boiler. 12A also gave a particularly efficient performance approaching Emerald towards Lakeside on 26 January 1976, cresting the grade at 12 mph (19 km/h), though the boiler pressure dropped from 170 to 140 psi (1,170 to 970 kPa), generating 253 hp (189 kW) at rail, the best result on that slope. The latter performance was attributed to a difference in blast pipe diameter, which reduced fuel consumption per power unit generated.

Notably, in the above trials both 6A and 12A operated better in the reverse direction, with one notch shorter cut-off generatuing a harder and more even exhaust beat; this indicated better valve timing and steam expense. The author, Abbott, suggested that running the NAs with the funnel facing Melbourne would result in reduced operating expenses. At the time Emerald did not have its turntable, so the only way to turn the engines would have been with a pair of hired cranes to lift and spin them, or by mounting an engine on flat transfer wagon 129Q then turning the whole wagon at a regular locomotive turntable, for example the one at Jolimont Workshops, about 40 kilomteres away. This was moot at the time anyway, because the necessary flat wagon was occupied by engine 8A in storage at Ballarat North Workshops. In practice engines did occasionally run with the funnels facing Melbourne in the 1990s and early 2000s, possibly to reduce uneven wheel wear rather than for fuel consumption reasons.

The coal consumption estimates of 6 to 8 lb/hp (3.6 to 4.9 kg/kW)/hour were noted to be quite high, compared to an expected figure of 4 to 6 lb/hp (2.4 to 3.6 kg/kW)/hour. The NAs were therefore consuming as much as 1,150 to 1,650 lb (520 to 750 kg)/hour of coal. In the second article a record of fuel consumption had been obtained, noting the use of coal from Muswellbrook, New South Wales. The specifications of the coal given were: 3,4% moisture, 7.1% ash, 37.4% volatile matter, swelling index 1, ash softening 2,590 °F (1,420 °C), ash fusion 2,840 °F (1,560 °C), calorific value 13,190 BTU/lb (30,700 kJ/kg). The coal was noted as good quality but dependent on a specific firing method, with small quantities added at regular intervals to maintain air flow and avoid production of thick, black smoke (which represented wasted energy).

The average run between Belgrave and Menzies Creek at the time would consume coal at an average rate of about three shovelfulls per minute, or 1,000 lb (450 kg) per hour, with higher values when travelling uphill countered by gaps when rolling downhill. The consumption average across five tests was 61 shovels used over 20 to 25 minutes, equivalent to 89 pounds per mile (25 kg/km), 920 lb (420 kg)/hour, or 102 lb/ft^{2} (500 kg/m^{2}) of firebox grate area per hour. Other tests undertaken between Lakeside and Emerald required 30% more fuel, in sets of up to three scoops at a time and at shorter intervals.

Abbott judged that the Puffing Billy engines, given the low speed, high tractive effort work they were doing, would have been better equipped with a firebox grate area of about 12 ft^{2} (1.1 m^{2}) instead of only 9 ft^{2} (0.84 m^{2}). This would have reduced the fuel burning rate to around 75 to 95 lb/ft^{2} (370 to 460 kg/m^{2}) of grate space per hour. He also noted that, because of the small blast pipe diameter, about a quarter of the fuel used was only partially burned and ended up as ash in the smokebox. The suggested solution was to try widening the 2 inches (51 mm) diameter nozzles of the blast pipe to as much as 2.2 inches (56 mm), a size better suited for the 13 inches (330 mm) cylinder bore.

With the creation of the Emerald Tourist Railway Board in 1977, and subsequent dedicated maintenance facilities at Belgrave, the performance and reliability of the NA class engines further improved. On 1 October 1978 6NA was noted as running faster, and using less coal, on the run from Belgrave to Menzies Creek. On that run the engine, hauling an estimated 105 LT (107 t) on a 1-in-40 slope, covered the one-mile section between mileposts 27 and 28 in 4 minutes 20 seconds, an average speed of 13.9 mph (22.4 km/h) despite two track maintenance restrictions of maximum 5 miles per hour (8.0 km/h) each. The complete run from Belgrave to Menzies Creek required 54 shovelfulls of coal over 19 minutes, a total of about 300 pounds (140 kg). The cutoff was noted as five notches back initially, and later six notches back (one off from mid-gear, equivalent to neutral position). The boiler pressure was maintained at 170 to 175 psi (1,170 to 1,210 kPa) and no black smoke was observed, indicating good combustion. The estimated tractive erffort over the 1-in-40 section was 6,650 lbf (29.6 kN), working out as 246 hp (183 kW) at rail. The next goals set were to reduce coal consumption, and to achieve 250 hp (190 kW) at rail; these were speculated to be possible with the blastpipe caps opened out from 2.375 in (60.3 mm) to 2.75 in (70 mm).

==== Improved performance of 8A ====
When 8A returned to service on 31 July 1982, it retained its altered exhaust system that had been installed in the 1920s to provide superior performance. As noted elsewhere the design was based on research at the University of Illinois in the 1920s, and featured a low blast pipe nozzle with a diameter of 3.25 in (83 mm) and a tapered funnel, in lieu of the other engines' twin 2.125 in (54.0 mm) nozzles.

The engine was known to be a good steamer as a result, with less back pressure in the cylinders and therefore more energy available for motion. In preservation the engine was described as having "a hard even exhaust, something different from the old Baldwin type front ends, and more towards the deep throaty note of the later A2s with Edgar Brownbills MFE [Modified Front End] of 1936."

A series of data collection was performed on 24 April 1984, with the engine hauling 12 vehicles. The official weight of the train would have been 91 LT (92 t), but with only partial loading due to inclement weather it was estimated as 70 to 27 LT (71 to 27 t). This, combined with the weight of the engine, made for a total weight of 104 to 109 LT (106 to 111 t); the range of results is given below in the tractive effort and power at rail columns. The engine speedometer was reporting higher speeds than actually achieved, by about 15%, so speed estimates were based on the rotation of driving wheel cranks of around 41 to 42 cycles in 15 second intervals.

Section	Gradient	Average grade curve resistance	Final speed	Tractive effort	Power at rail	Commentary
Mileposts 27 to 28	Average 1 in 40	63 lbf/LT (0.28 N/kg)	15.5 mph (24.9 km/h)	6,550 to 6,850 lbf (29.1 to 30.5 kN)	271 to 284 hp (202 to 212 kW)	Cut off 6 notches back from full gear (8 notches to mid gear). Firing rate, 20 fires of 3 scoops each, estimated at 6 lb (2.7 kg) per scoop, net 60 lb/mi (17 kg/km). Throttle open 1/3 to half. Water level 3 studs.
Milepost 31.25 to Emerald crossing	Average 1 in 31	79 lbf/LT (0.35 N/kg)	11.3 mph (18.2 km/h)	8,200 to 8,600 lbf (36 to 38 kN)	247 to 259 hp (184 to 193 kW)	Cut off 5 notches on 1 in 31 slope.
Lakeside to Emerald crossing	Average 1 in 43	59 lbf/LT (0.26 N/kg)	13.3 mph (21.4 km/h)	6,150 to 6,450 lbf (27.4 to 28.7 kN)	218 to 228 hp (163 to 170 kW)	Standing start from Lakeside, time to crossing east of Emerald station. Time for 1.9 mi (3.1 km) was 8 minutes 32 seconds. Slow speed for 0.25 mi (0.40 km) from Lakeside due to curve speed restriction, then full power.
Mileposts 33.5 to 32.5	Average 1 in 40	63 lbf/LT (0.28 N/kg)	16.4 mph (26.4 km/h)	6,550 to 6,850 lbf (29.1 to 30.5 kN)	286 to 299 hp (213 to 223 kW)	Locomotive speedometer consistently showed 20 mph (32 km/h). No black smoke noted.

The method for calculating Rail Horsepower was given as:

$RHP = \frac{(te)(v)}{375}$

where

- te is tractive effort in pounds-force
- v is the speed in m.p.h.

and the sum of curve and rolling resistance was taken as 7 lb/LT (3.1 kg/t), so the actual 1 in 40 slope was treated as creating 56 lb/LT (25 kg/t), in addition to the curve resistance of 63 lb/LT (28 kg/t).

All up, the engine's record of over 30 hp/sq ft (240 kW/m^{2}) firebox grate space put it among the best-performing, non-superheated steam locomotives, with potential for a further 10% improvement speculated.

=== Liveries ===
Locomotives 1A and 2A were most likely delivered in Light Ivy Green and Gold, to Baldwin Style 292. The first four Newport engines would have been painted in Victorian Railways' standard two-tone Brunswick Green with black and white lining, then 7A was the first to enter service painted in the new Canadian Red and Brown livery with white lining. This scheme was simplified over time to an unlined deep red, and from 1921 all Victorian Railways engines were painted all-over black.

In the early 1950s a number of steam engines around the state started to pick up red lining, buffer beams, handrails and other elements as engine crews and maintenance staff saw fit, and by the time of the final Young Sun specials in 1958 both 6A and 7A had been given red buffer beams, handrails above the tanks and a red strip along the running boards. 7A additionally featured straw lining around the cabside windows and doorways. The engines remained in this condition while stored at Newport Workshops. Notably, these changes were made separately rather than as a defined plan; a photo of 7A circa 1957 shows the straw lining, red buffer beam, number plate and headlight surround, but no lining of the running boards. On return to Belgrave in 1962 and refurbishment 7A had lost its red-painted headlight, red-relief, brass serif number plates, and the straw lining was removed by 1964.

== In Service ==
=== Construction of the Narrow Gauge lines ===
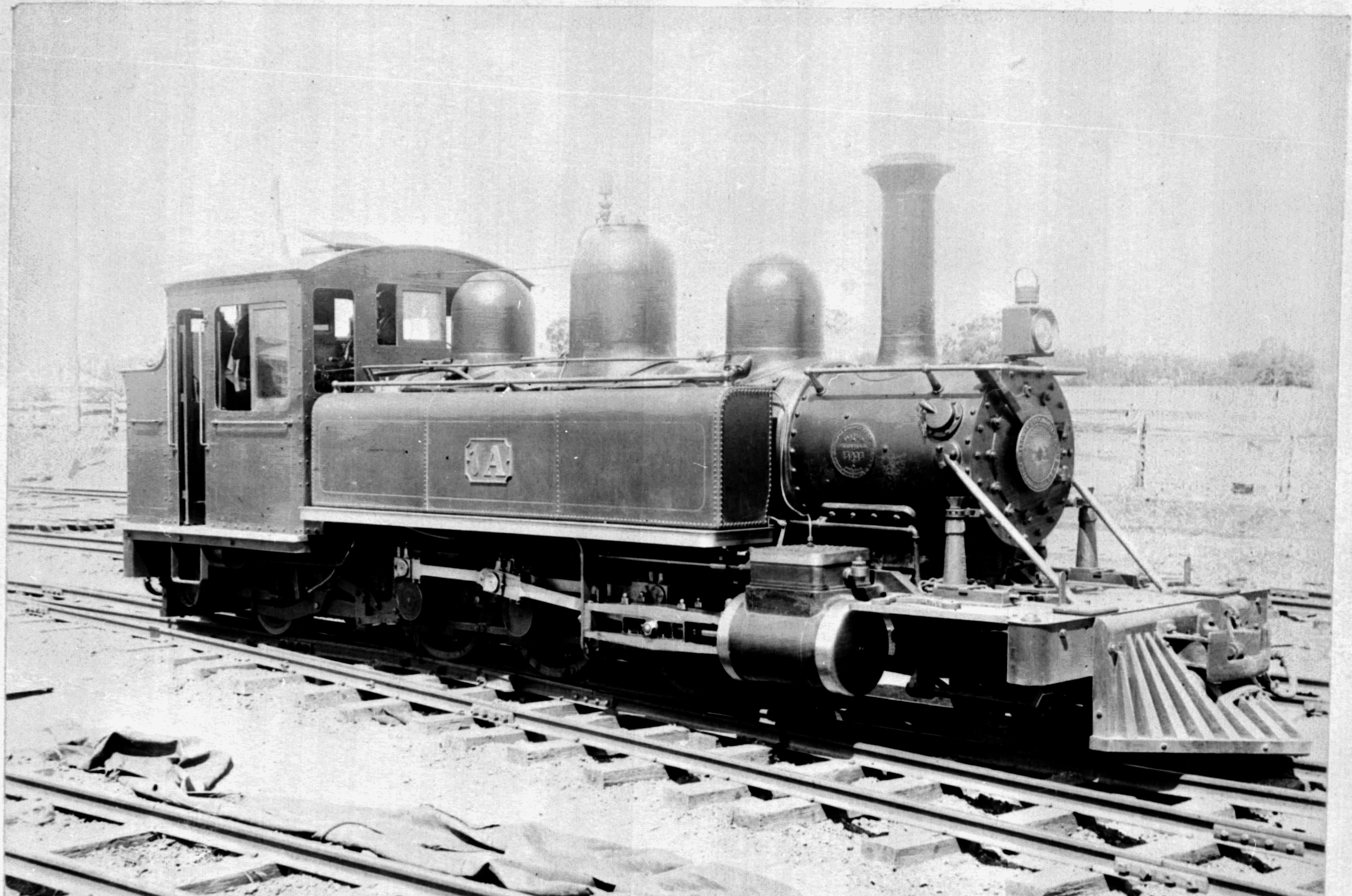
Victorian Railways locomotive 1A at Wangaratta in 1902.

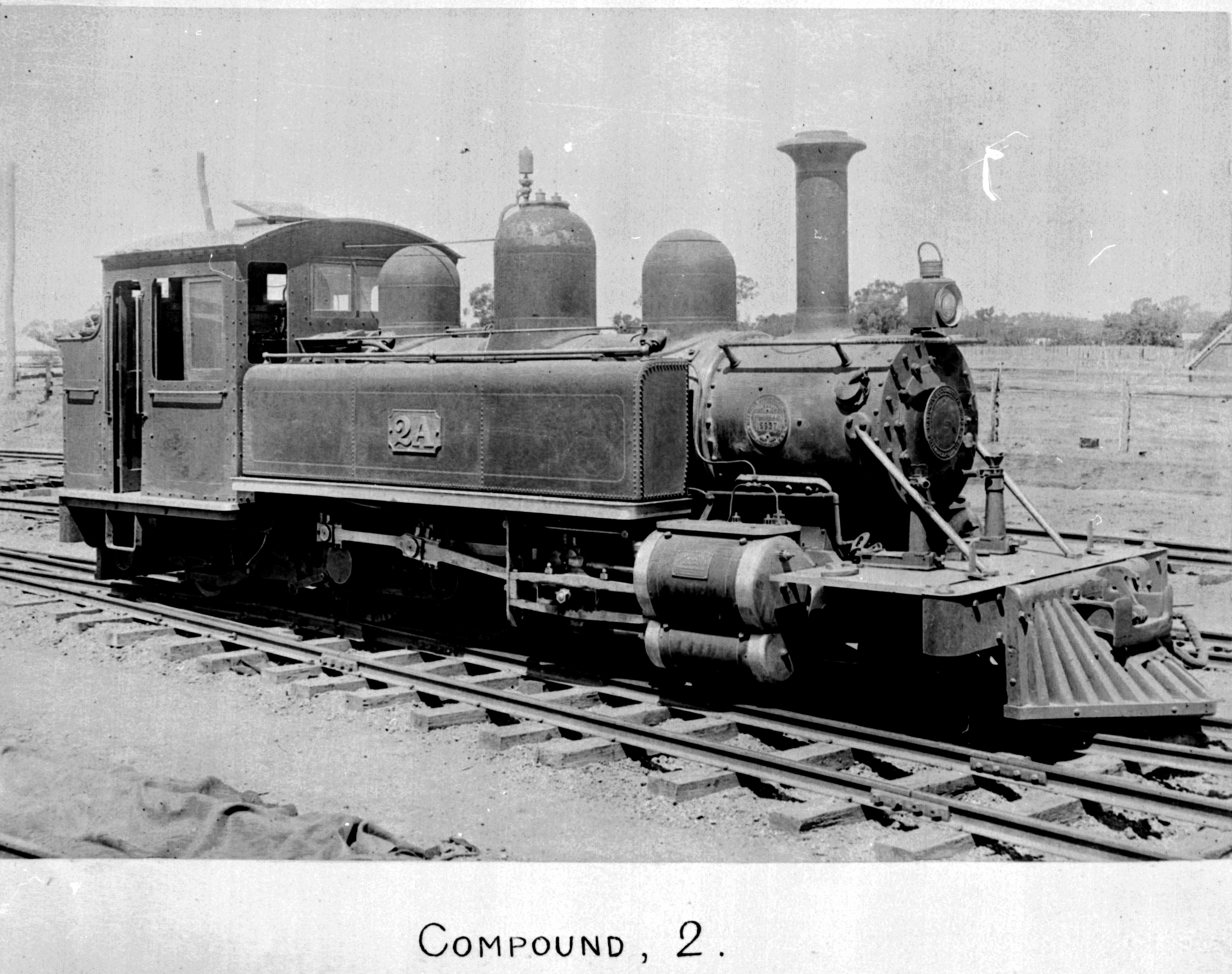
Victorian Railways locomotive 2A at Wangaratta in 1902.

After engines 1A and 2A entered service on the Whitfield line, and 3A and 4A on the Gembrook line, the next pair to enter service were 5A and 6A on the Beech Forest line. 2A is thought to have operated the first train to Whitfield, and 4A was known to have worked the first Gembrook line train.

This deployment of engines 1-6A remained until July 1901. By February 1902, 3A had moved from the Gembrook line to the Beech Forest line, and 5A from Beech Forest to Gembrook by the end of that year. Construction of the Walhalla line started in May 1904, and by February 1905 engine 1A had been moved from Wangaratta to Moe to assist with construction work; 7A then entered service at Wangaratta in its place.

However, the Walhalla line was slow to proceed due to limitations on available funding and complexity of terrain, so by January 1906 1A had left Moe for Colac. A month later, 3A was cascaded from Colac to Upper Ferntree Gully, then in April 4A was shifted from Upper Ferntree Gully to Wangaratta.

1A was returned to Moe for construction trains in November 1907, and joined by 4A from Wangaratta in May 1909, and 9A newly built in January 1910 as the only engine to enter service there. 10A began operation on the line from Colac around the same time the extension from Beech Forest to Crowes opened, followed by 12A, 13A, 14A and 16A, while 11A, 15A and 17A started at Upper Ferntree Gully.

=== Introduction of the Garratts, withdrawal of the Baldwins, and the Great Depression ===
Immediately before the Garratt locomotives entered service, Compound engines 2A and 4A were based at Whitfield, 1A, 6A, 7A, 8A and 11A were allocated to Upper Ferntree Gully, 5A, 9A, 14A, 16A and 17A were at Colac and 10A, 12A, 13A and 15A were at Moe. It is not clear where 3A was.

G41 was introduced at Colac in June 1926, followed by 16A and 17A both departing. When G42 started operating at Moe in July 1926, 13A was transferred from Moe to Whitfield as the third engine on that line. 1A was transferred from Upper Ferntree Gully to Newport Workshops in March 1929, followed by 2A from Wangaratta shortly thereafter, and both engines were scrapped. These were followed in 1933 by 10A and 16A from Upper Ferntree Gully, and 4A from Wangaratta. 16A would see a brief revival at Moe in November 1935 before it and 4A were scrapped in 1936, though 10A remained at Newport until being broken up in 1945. The cab of 16A was recycled on engine 5A, resulting in that unit showing incorrect cabside builders plates for the rest of its operating life.

At the time the Garratts were introduced, it was noted that the two NA engines on the Whitfield line were not interchangeable with the rest of the fleet; at the time these were the two Compound engines.

=== World War II and aftermath ===
Even with G41 and G42 in service the NAs were still the backbone of the VR Narrow Gauge Lines right up until the 1950s, when the demand for rail services reduced. 17A was withdrawn from Moe in 1950, followed by 9A (Moe), 11A (Colac) and 15A (Wangaratta) in 1953, 8A (Upper Ferntree Gully), 12A (Moe) and 13A (Wangaratta) in 1954, and 3A from Upper Ferntree Gully in 1955. 5A was withdrawn from Colac at the end of 1957, and 6A and 7A were retired following closure of the Upper Ferntree Gully to Belgrave (formerly Gembrook) line at the end of 1957 for conversion to broad gauge. Those two engines were stored at Newport Workshops, finally being joined by 14A from Colac in April 1962. The two Garratts were withdrawn in July the same year.

Engine 8A had been the last to run the full length of the Gembrook line, returning prior to the landslide between Belgrave and Menzies Creek that resulted in the initial closure of the line. The same engine was used on a works train later that month to visit the site of the landslide and assess options, but the Victorian Railways chose not to repair the track. The engine was condemned and stored at Upper Ferntree Gully on 1 September 1954, then in January 1955 it, along with some passenger and all goods stock, was moved from there to Newport Workshops. Later in 1955 the engine was donated as playground equipment to Beaumaris, Victoria, followed by 3A to Portsea, Victoria in 1960. As of April 1962, engines 6A, 7A, 12A and 14A were all stored at Newport Workshops.

Over the course of the engines' operating lives under the Victorian Railways, the engines were shifted around in a cascading system to put each through the Workshops on an as-needed basis. However, not every locomotive would run on each of the four narrow gauge lines. For example, 2A only ever ran on the Whitfield line, while 5A, 8A-11A, 16A-17A never did, and 4A never ran on the Beech Forest and Crowes line. (Note: Engines 3A, 5A, 6A, 7A, 10A, 14A and 17A each have a portion of time unaccounted for. This was most likely workshop time, but may represent times the engines were allocated to other locations. For 5A, 6A and 7A this is only about a month each; 10A is a full year from late 1916 to late 1917. 3A is missing data for about six months in late 1909 to mid 1910 and a further period from mid 1925 to early 1928; 14A is missing late 1929 to early 1932, and 17A is missing mid 1926 to mid 1929.)

A number of engines only spent brief periods on one or more lines, covering for other locomotives undergoing maintenance or periods of high traffic, e.g. around public holidays; for instance 11A was only on the Moe line briefly around January 1941. Of the six engines that still survive today, 14A spent only a fraction of its career on the Gembrook line (about 5%, with 70% on the Crowes line, and roughly 10% each on the Walhalla and Whitfield lines), while 8A worked on the Gembrook line for over 80% of its service life with the Victorian Railways (the balance split across Crowes and Walhalla). All six preserved locomotives (along with 13A) were based at Colac in October 1914; 3A left for Moe in December 1914, but the other five remained until June 1915. (Note: Data in the source lists assorted monthly totals, excluding return workshop trips; percentages are derived from that dataset.)

== Maintenance ==
The Victorian Railways' locomotive maintenance schedule specified types of exams by letter, e.g. "A", "B", "C", "D" and "E" exams, sometimes with number suffices, or combined.

NA class locomotives were required to undergo an "A" exam every month if they had not run at least 1,500 miles (2,400 km). The "A" exam required checking the wheels, tyres, axles and frames, flange lubricators and turbo generators, as well as lubricating of the intermediate (radial type) buffers.

At 3,000 miles (4,800 km) intervals or every two months (Note: AB exams were every six weeks for broad gauge engines) an "AB" exam was conducted, checking the axles and cranks, whole of the brake system including blocks, hangers, brackets and reservoirs, and dismantling the feed valve for cleaning; the engine frame and cylinder castings would also be checked for cracks, and the coupled axlebox clearances would be checked with feelers and the wedges adjusted if necessary. The boiler would be reviewed with tubes examined, stays and fusible plugs checked and replaced if necessary, brick arch, baffle plate and firehole door among other elements would be reviewed; if the brick arch was removed then the stays it was resting on would be hammer-tested as well. The ashpan operating gear and smokebox seal and spark arrestors would also be checked, along with the main steam pipe and boiler mountings like the injectors being removed for inspection and cleaning. All oil trimmings would be replaced, and the sanding gear resecured if necessary.

The "ABC" exam was at 12,000 miles (19,000 km) or annual intervals (9,000 miles (14,000 km) for the Garratt and S Class pacific locomotives), with all the above checked plus additional reviews of the braking system pipework and feed systems, hand brakes, cylinder rods, pistons and cocks, motion and valve gear, boiler safety valves, gauges calibrating and brackets resecured, and excessive smoke box carbon buildup would be burned out.

The "ABCD" exam was at 24,000 miles (39,000 km) or biannual intervals (18,000 miles (29,000 km) for the Garratt and S Class pacific locomotives), with all the above checked plus the drawgear (couplers and connections) being checked. The "ABCE" exam was at 36,000 miles (58,000 km) or four year intervals (27,000 miles (43,000 km) for the Garratt and S Class pacific locomotives), and added the eccentric valve gear and axlebox inspections along with axlebox wool rolls and the engine brake pipes being completely replaced.

Finally, the "ABCDE" exam was at 72,000 miles (116,000 km), without a timeline specified (54,000 miles (87,000 km) for the Garratt and S Class pacific locomotives), and required the engine to be lifted from its wheels (or placed over a drop pit to lower the wheels from the axleboxes), with all associated fittings reviewed and renewed as necessary.

== Preservation ==
As of January 2021, the Puffing Billy Railway operates NA class locomotives 6A, 7A, 8A, 12A, and 14A. The Railway also has engine 3A as a static display.

=== 3A ===
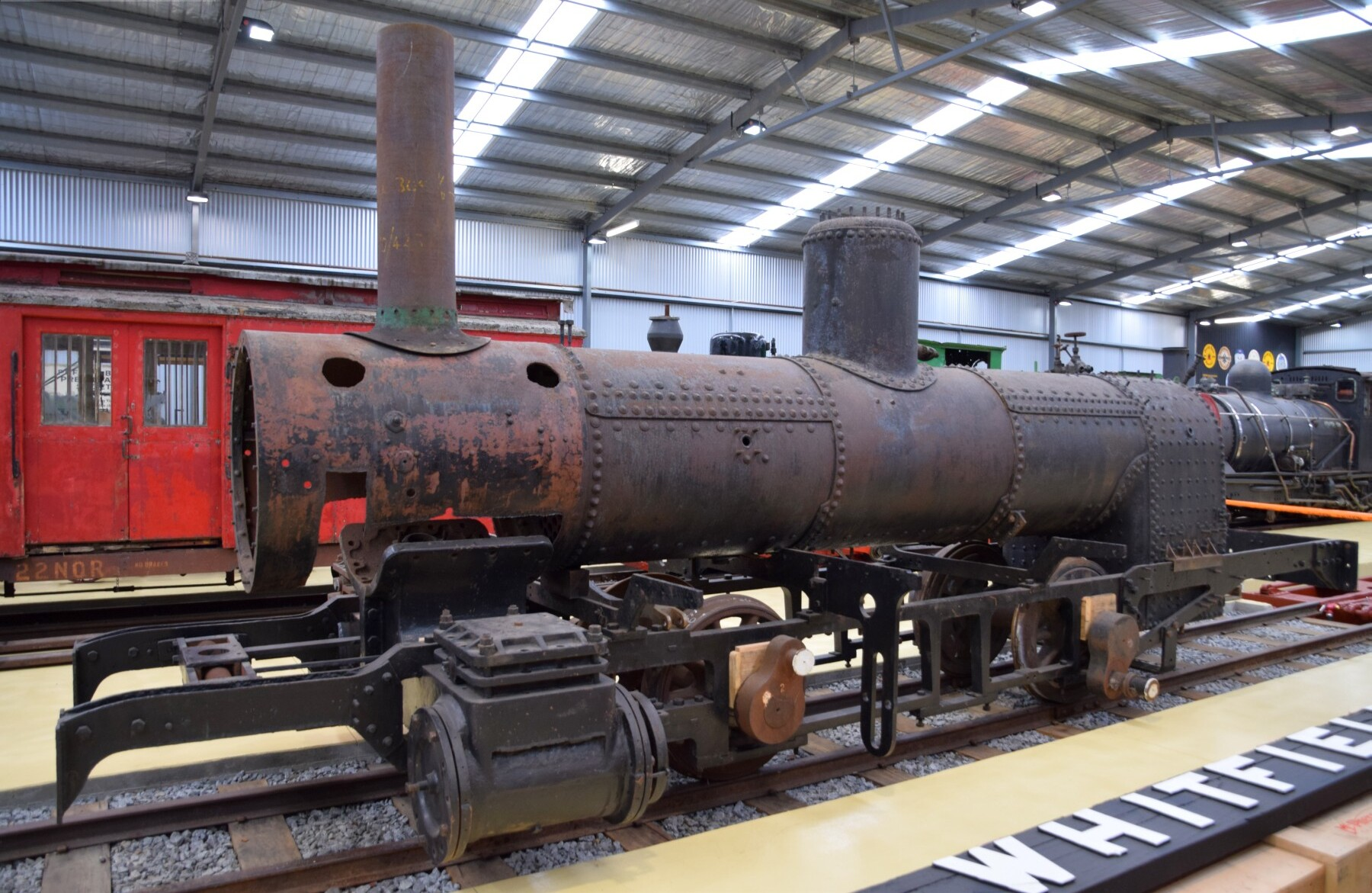
3A frames at Menzies Creek museum

This engine was withdrawn from service at Upper Ferntree Gully in 1955 and written off in November that year, although it was still intact at Newport Workshops in 1960. It was sold in 1960 to the Lord Mayor's Camp at Portsea where it remained on static display until 1977 when it was brought to Belgrave for eventual restoration.

The engine frames are currently located in Lakeside Discovery Centre on display, having previously been adjacent to flat wagon 129Q in the Menzies Creek museum.

=== 6A ===
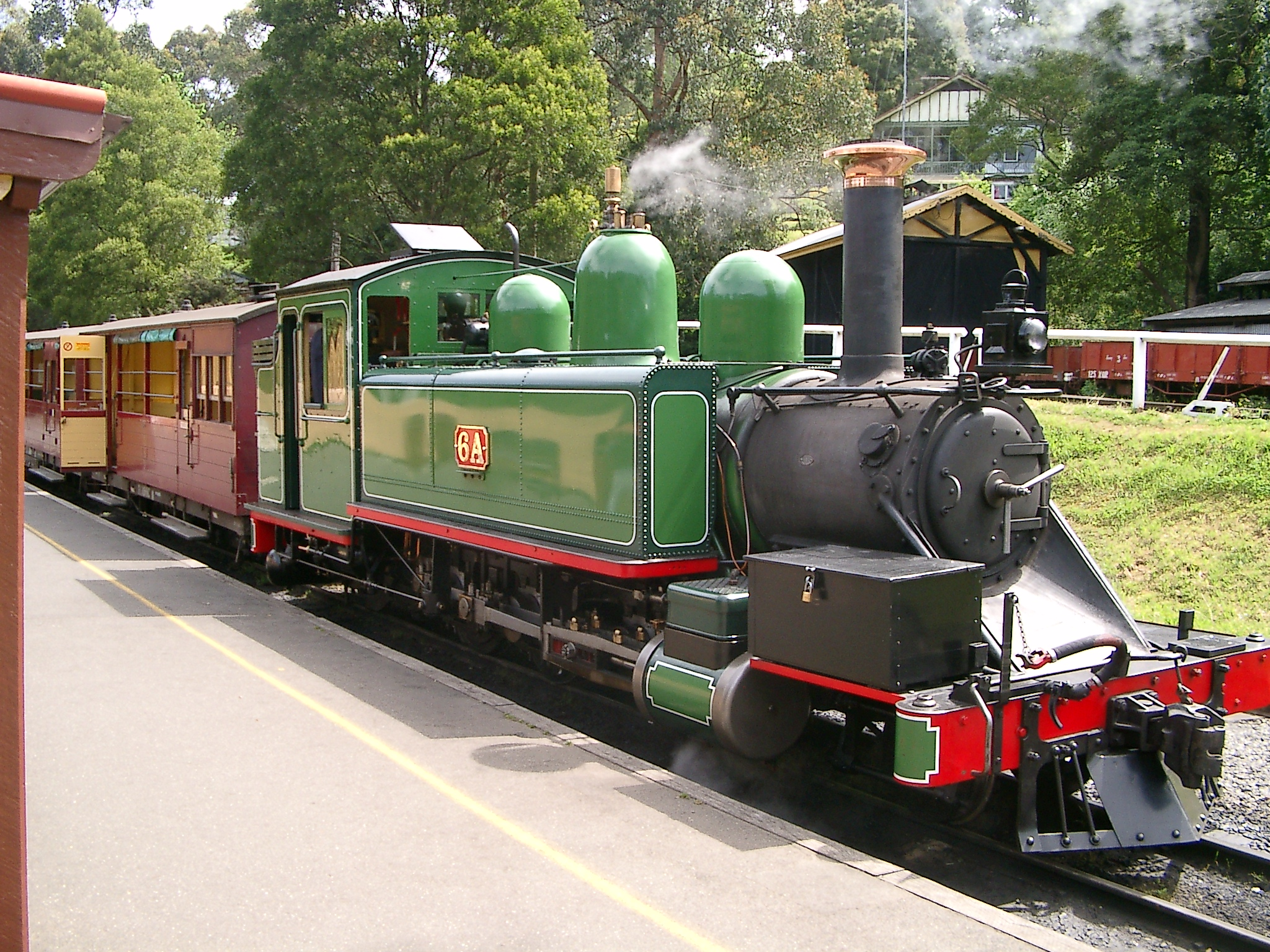
6A at Belgrave

6A arrived at the Puffing Billy Railway in June 1962, and was in use on regular service trains until January 1980, when it was withdrawn due to boiler problems. It returned to traffic on 13 December 1980 but was withdrawn again in September 1983 due to a condemned boiler and moved to the Menzies Creek Steam Museum for storage on 30 November that year. In April 1988 it returned to Belgrave for axle box repairs, but the following month its boiler was removed and was put into storage at the rear of the running shed along with 12A.

In October 1997 restoration of 6A commenced, led by the workshop's leading hand fitter Ron Gunn. Restoration progressed until March 2001 when the all steel welded boiler from 14A was fitted into 6A's frames. One of the modifications made under the direction of Nigel Day was the fitting of a new lempor exhaust system similar to L.D. Porta's design for South African Railways' Class 26 3450 the Red Devil. The system allows the exhaust steam to go through the funnel through four flues then up the funnel. A sleeve inside the funnel was also fitted for a quieter exhaust beat. These modifications made the engine extremely efficient, reliable and powerful. The locomotive was also painted in a more historically accurate Victorian Railways two-tone green livery with removable hungry boards on the bunker, a tapered steam dome, dummy ash ejectors on the smoke box, small builders plates, and double row of rivets on the water tanks.

From here on it became a high priority to have 6A available for the 2001/2002 Christmas holiday season, which was going to be the first time the Puffing Billy Railway required four locomotives to operate trains. On 17 December 2001, 6A moved under its own power for the first time in 18 years. After a couple of test trips over the following the 3 days 6A officially re-entered service on 22 December. Exactly a month later the Minister for Transport Peter Batchelor officially recommissioned 6A. It has been in regular operation ever since, mainly operating the Gembrook service. Between November 2016 and March 2019 6A was also used on Day out with Thomas weekends at Gembrook, alongside DH59 and 0-4-0 Peckett Sir John Grice in Thomas disguise.

In December 2017 the Lempor was removed and fitted to 14A. 6A was taken out of traffic in March 2019 for a D exam and Overhaul and as of January 2021 is awaiting new boiler tubes prior to reassembly.

=== 7A ===
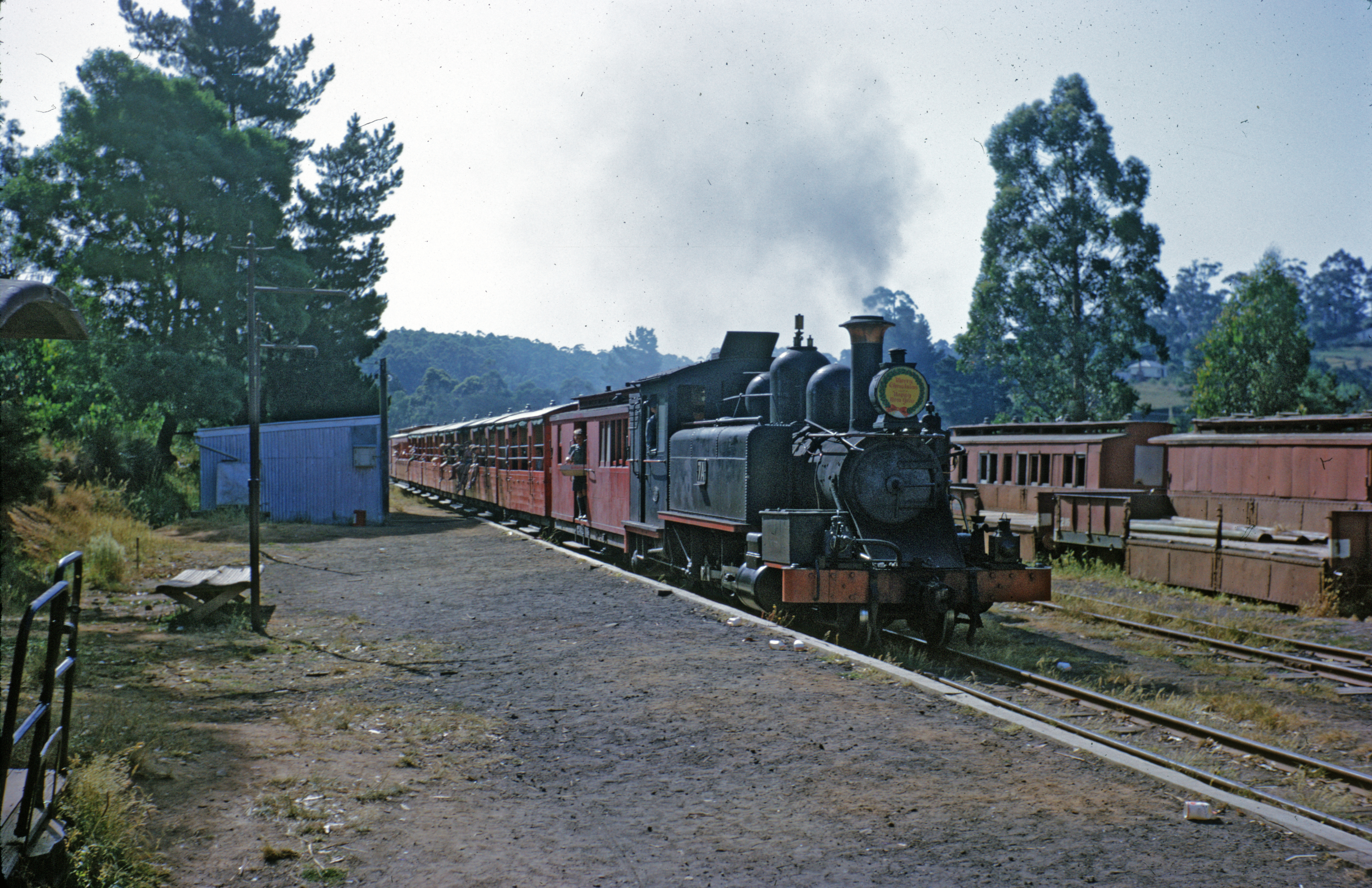
7A at Menzies Creek, circa 1962

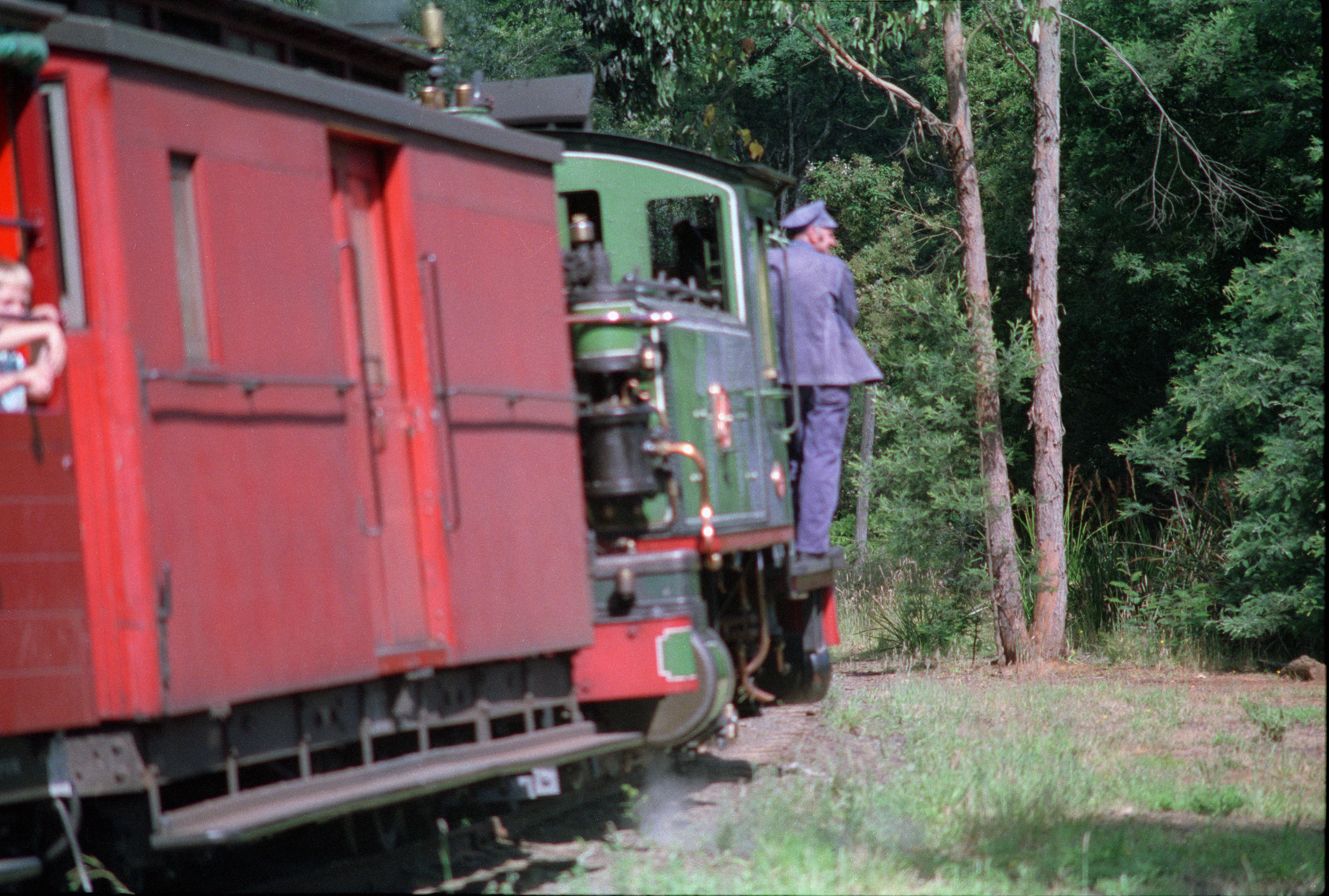
7A at Nobelius, 1988

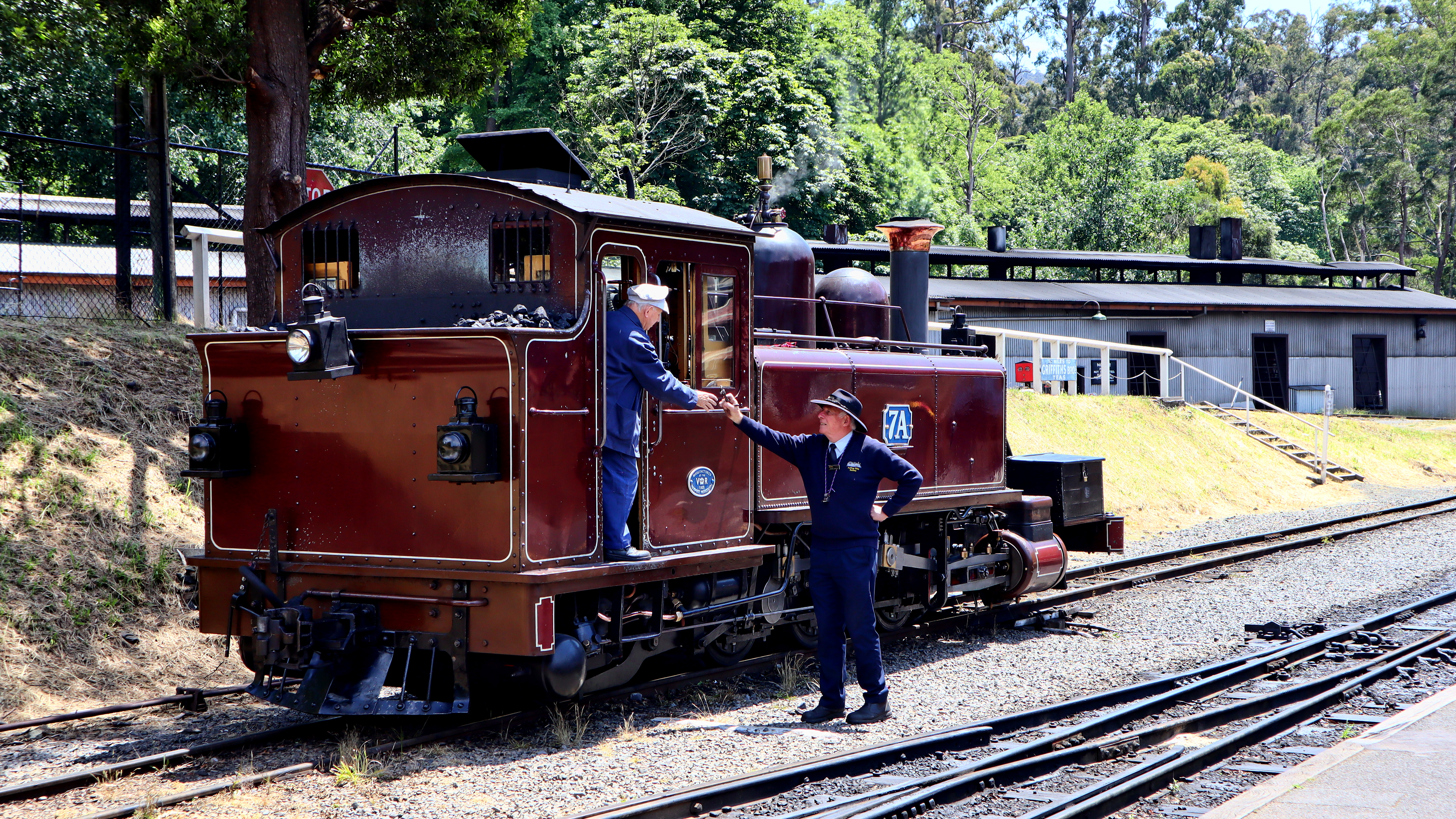
7A at Belgrave

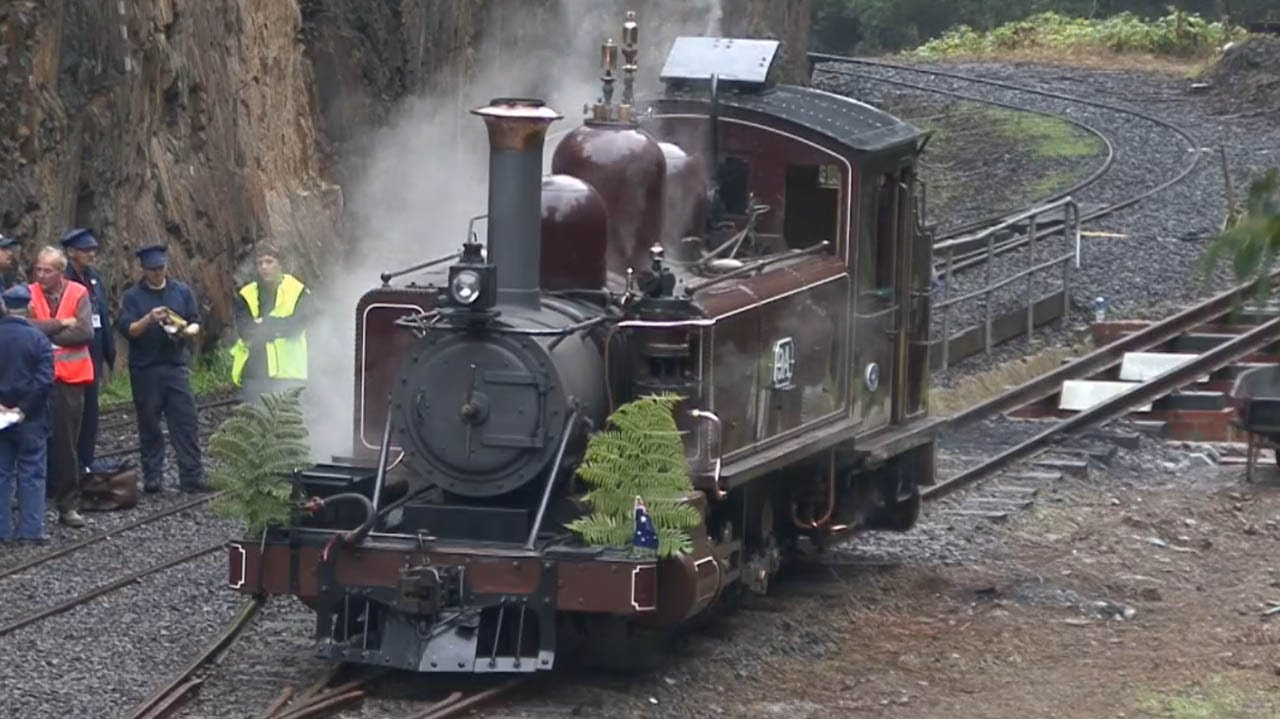
7A wearing 9A plates at Walhalla in 2010

7A was the first engine to arrive at the railway in March 1962; it hauled the reopening train to Menzies Creek on 28 July that year, and reopening to Lakeside in October 1975. In 1979 7A was repainted two tone green. In the mid-1990s it was turned to run bunker first towards Belgrave to equalize wear on the tires following a minor overhaul and repaint. On 18 December 2000 it hauled the special centenary recreation train to Gembrook and its return trip, celebrating 100 years since the opening of the Upper Ferntree Gully to Gembrook Railway. In June 2005 7A was turned again to equalize wear before returning to facing Gembrook just after its 100th Birthday in August 2005.

In April 2006 it was taken out of service for a full overhaul and repaint into a more historically accurate Canadian Pacific Red and Chocolate. It returned to traffic in December 2007. In May 2010 7A was sent by road to the Walhalla Goldfields Railway to celebrate the line's centenary. 7A is currently in regular traffic having been briefly stored for 9 months due to the COVID-19 pandemic, after which it hauled the reopening train on 28 November 2020.

=== 8A ===
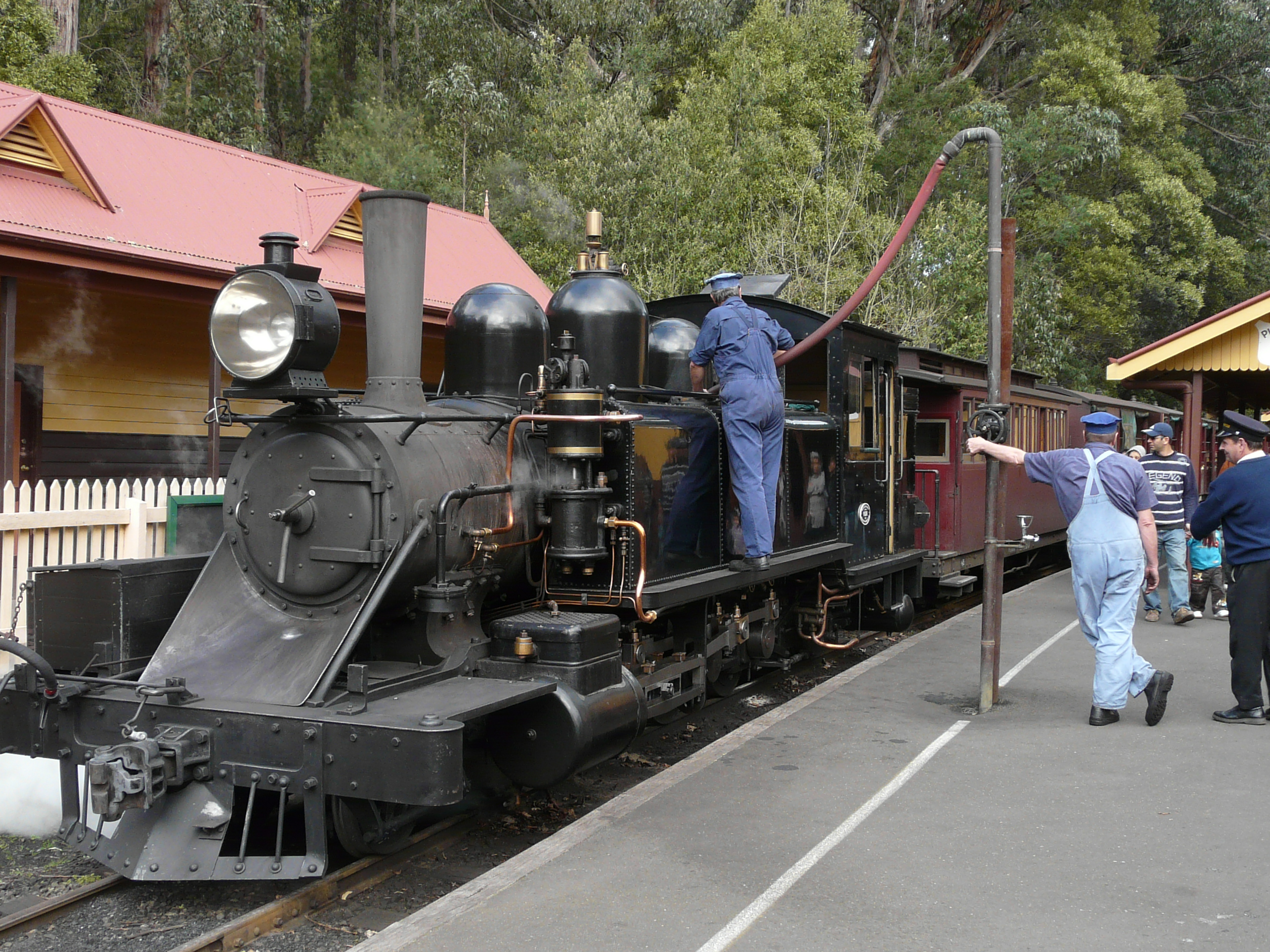
8A at Lakeside; note the different style of chimney

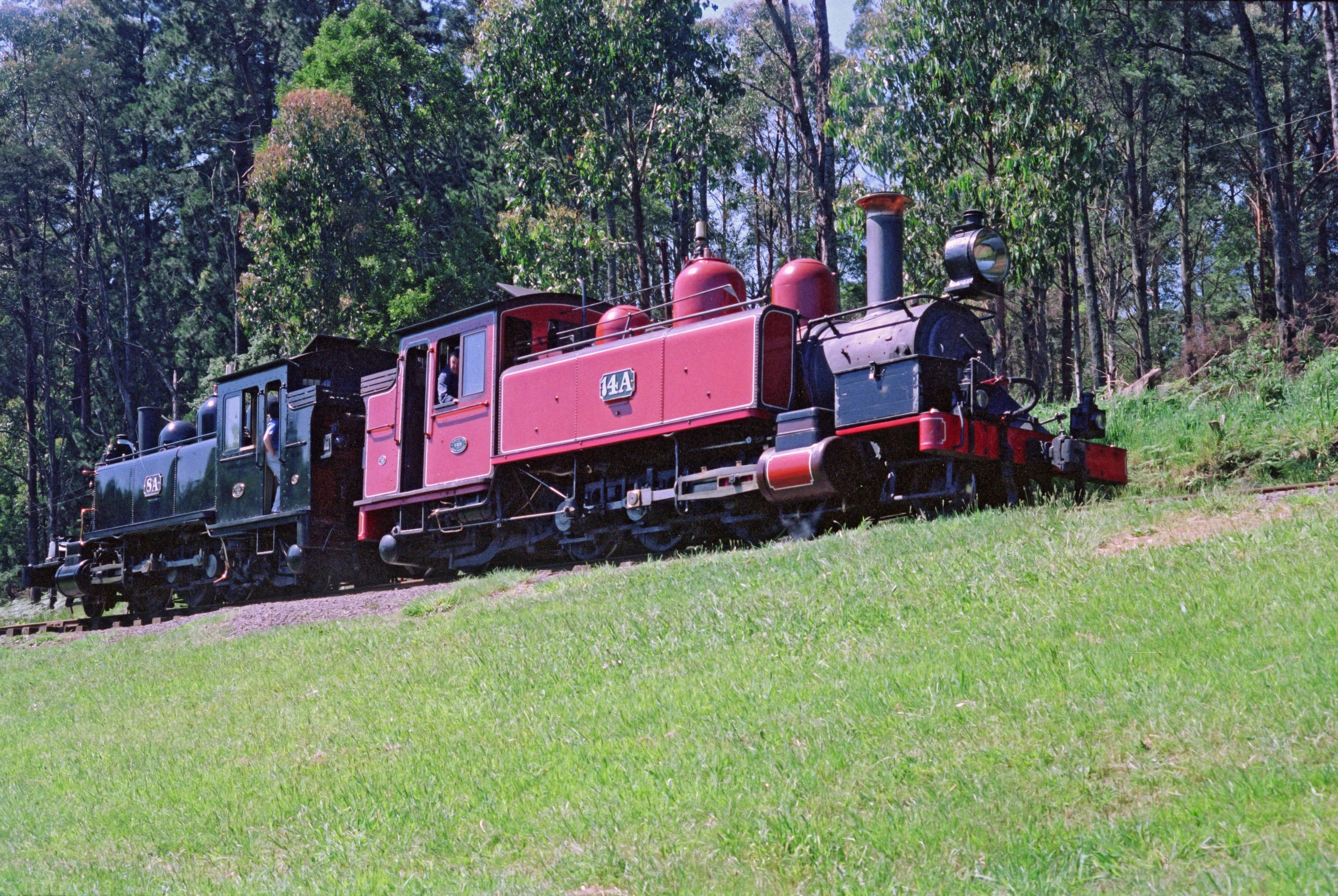
NA class locomotives Nos 14A (red) and 8A (black) at Lakeside, 1988, facing opposite directions.

8A was placed on a plinth in a children's playground in the suburb of Beaumaris near Sandringham in 1955. In 1970 the Puffing Billy Preservation Society purchased and removed the engine first to Newport Workshops, then to Emerald in 1976. In the intermediate period the engine, sans boiler cladding and some other fittings, was stored on top of transfer wagon 129Q outside Ballarat North Workshops. In 1977 restoration of the engine began at Belgrave and was completed in 1982, becoming the backbone of the fleet for the following 20 years.

In 1987 the engine was the first NA to be turned on the newly installed turntable in Emerald to test out wheel wear with the locomotive facing towards Belgrave. In 1988 regular driver Ron Picking fitted a former VR N class five chime whistle to the top of the drivers side water tank. In October 1998 8A became the first NA along with 12A to venture to Gembrook since 2 August 1953 hauling a public shakedown special.

In May 2002 8A was withdrawn from service and given a thorough overhaul, returning to service in October 2006. In June 2019 8A was quickly taken out of service due to issues with the main steam delivery pipes; these were found to have expired and since the railway was experiencing a loco shortage new external steam delivery pipes were fitted instead as a temporary measure. The locomotive is currently in regular traffic.

=== 12A ===
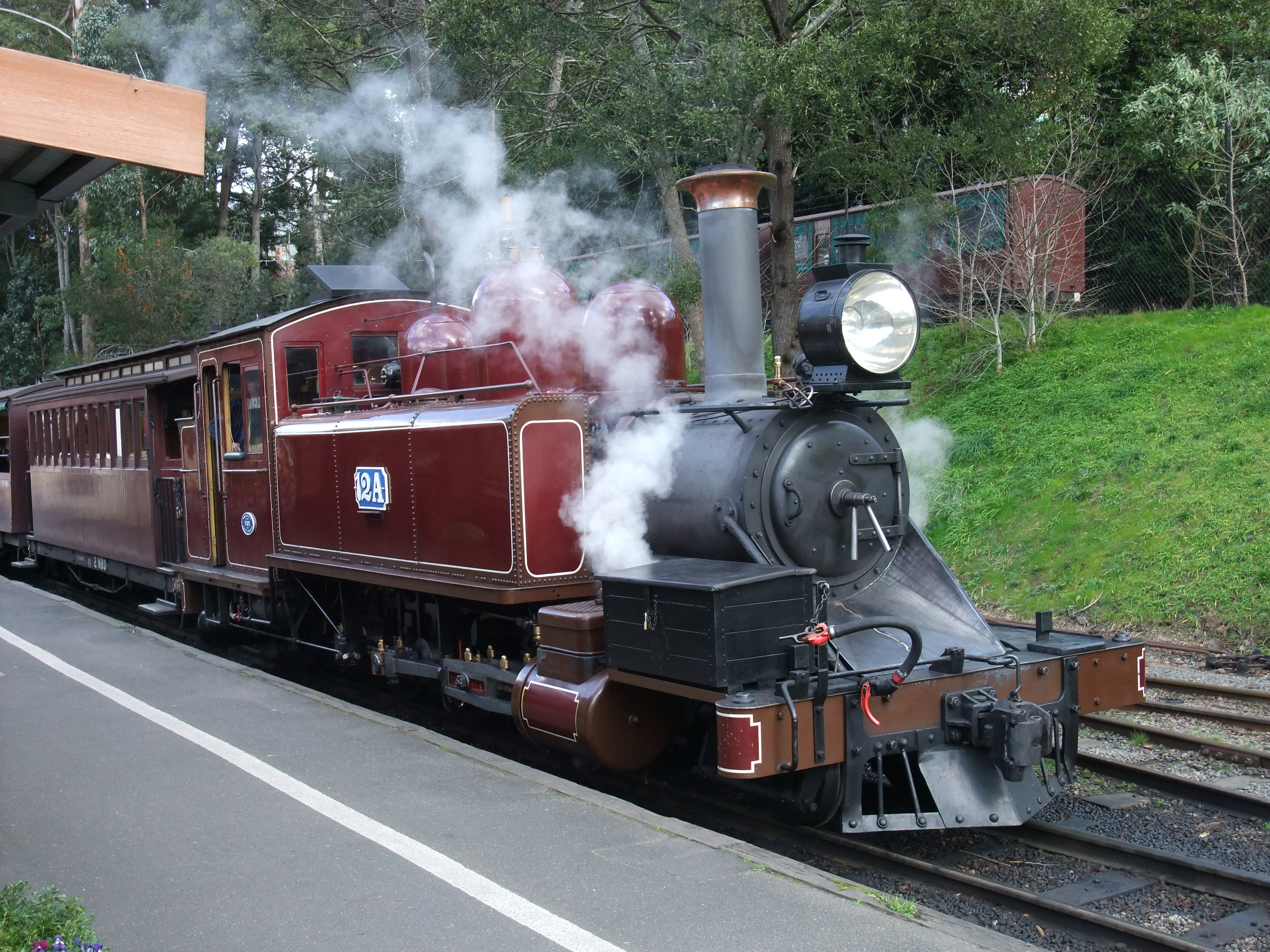
12A at Belgrave

12A returned to service after an overhaul at Newport in 1973, and was in regular service supplementing the other trafficable NAs at the time. In 1981 12A was used in the ABC television series Come Midnight Monday, where it was named Wombat. In 1982, it was totally worn out and withdrawn from traffic.

In 1985 it was placed in storage at the rear of the workshop headshunt in a dismantled state along with 6A until 1990 when it was moved into the workshop for restoration and overhaul. It returned to service in March 1993 in all-over black livery. In 1998 12A joined 8A with the first passenger train to Gembrook in early October, and then the first regular Gembrook Service on Monday 19 October. In June 2004, 12A was dirtied up for a special 1950s style Mixed train to Gembrook.

After a D exam it returned to traffic in March 2005, this time in black with red highlighting to commemorate 50 years of the Puffing Billy Preservation Society. In early October 2005, once the celebrations were completed, 12A was taken out of service pending a major overhaul. In December that year it was placed in storage at the Menzies Creek Museum. 10 months later, in October 2006 it was moved under its own steam back to Belgrave for its overhaul. In 2008, a group of apprentices painted the side tanks and cab of the locomotive Canadian Pacific red and chocolate. The overhaul was finally completed in 2013, with the loco returning to service in September of that year. As of January 2021 it is currently undergoing a D exam.

=== 14A ===
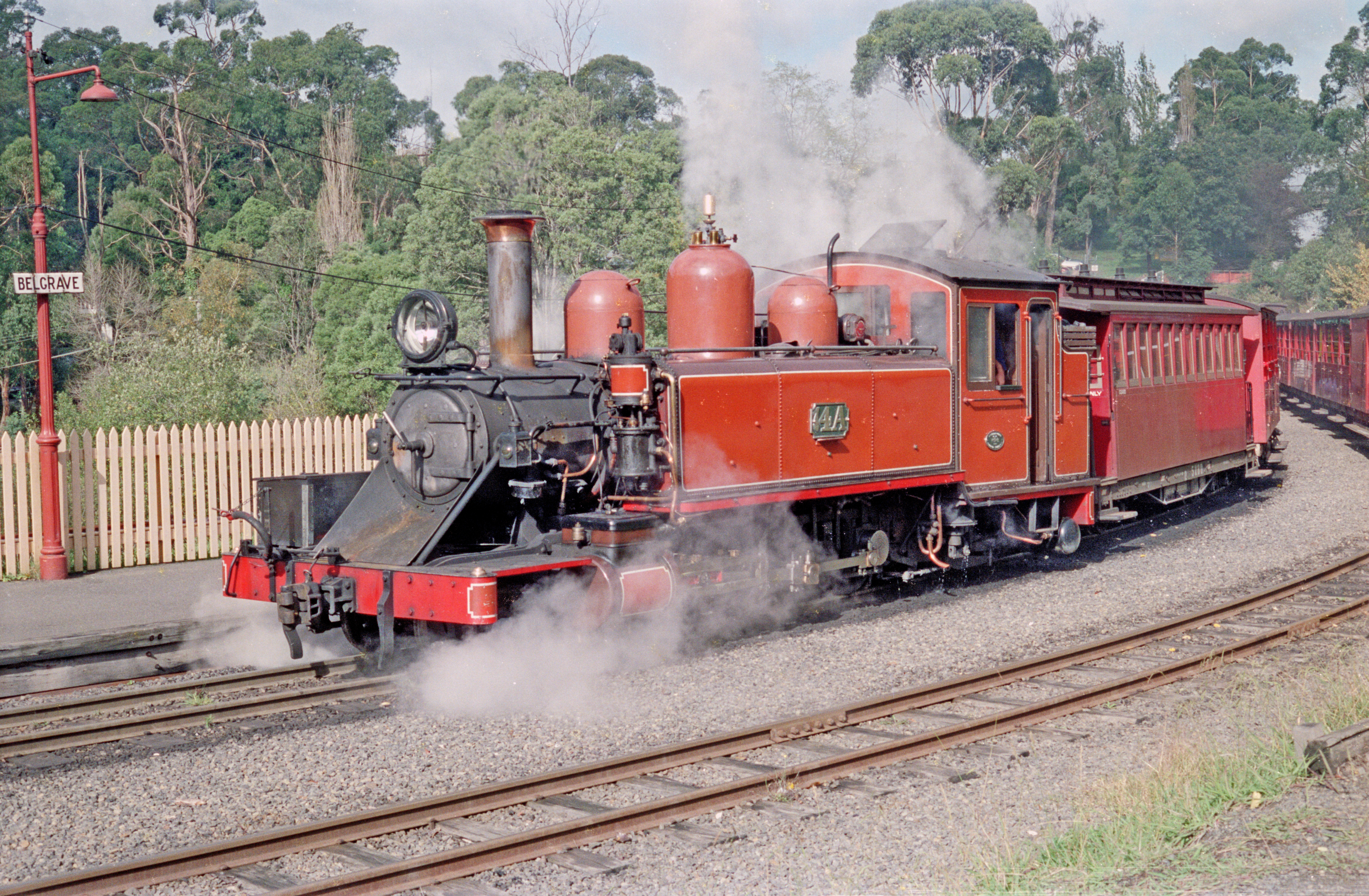
14A in bright red at Belgrave station in 1987

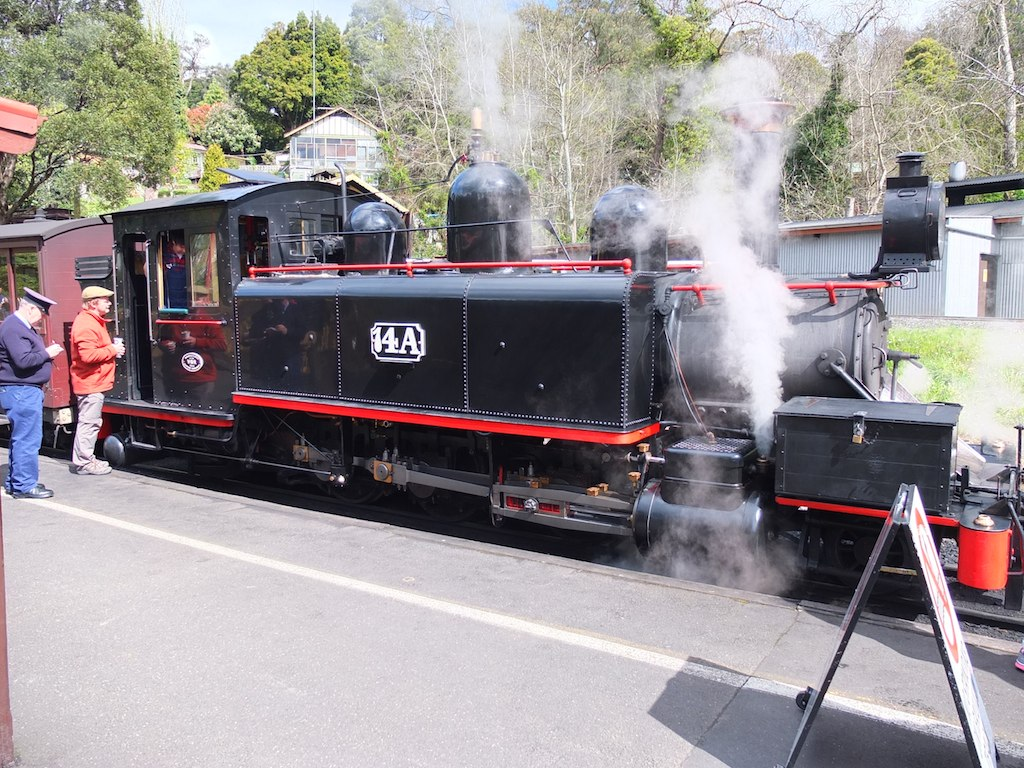
14A in black with red lining, September 2012

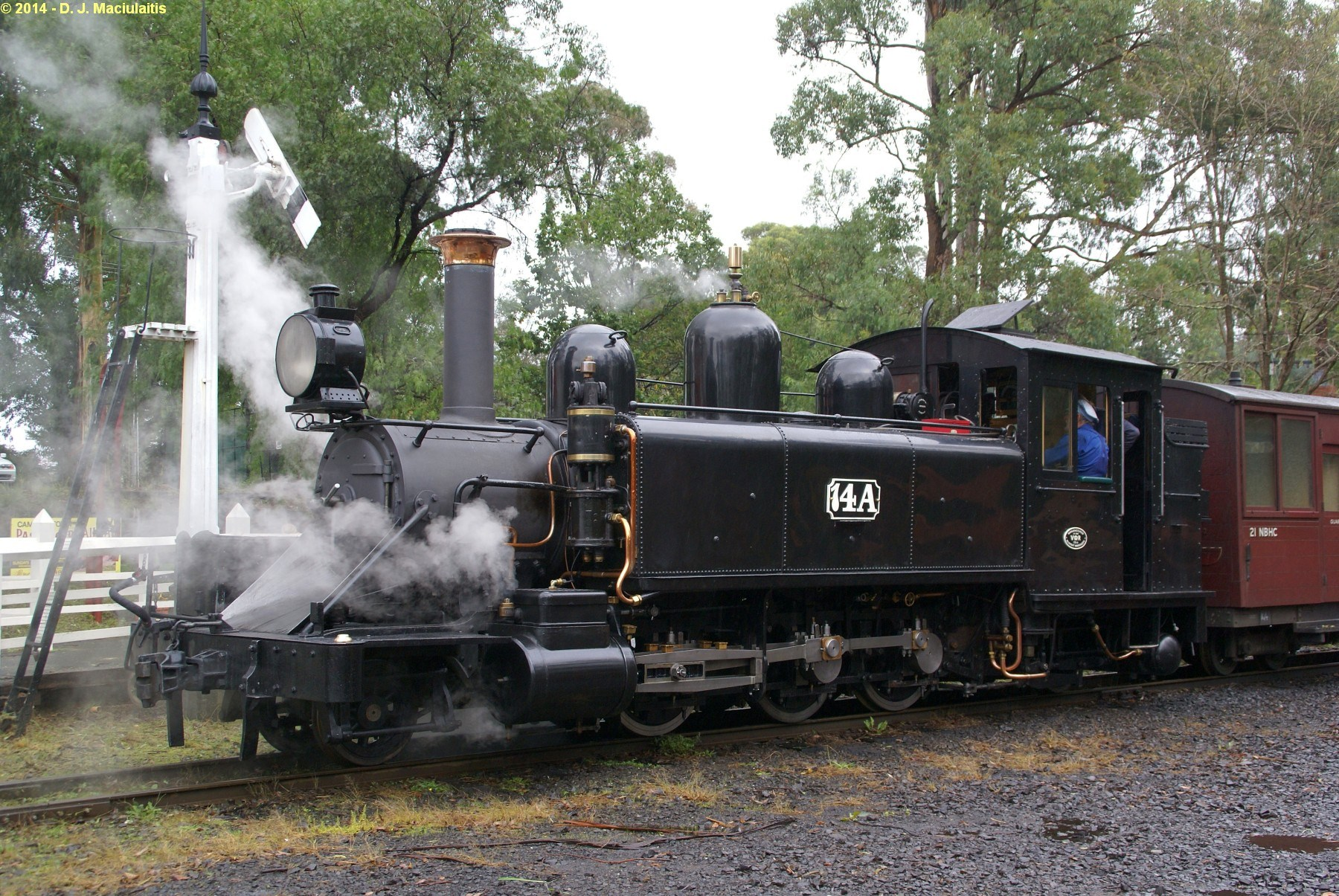
14A at Menzies Creek, painted black, 10 May 2014

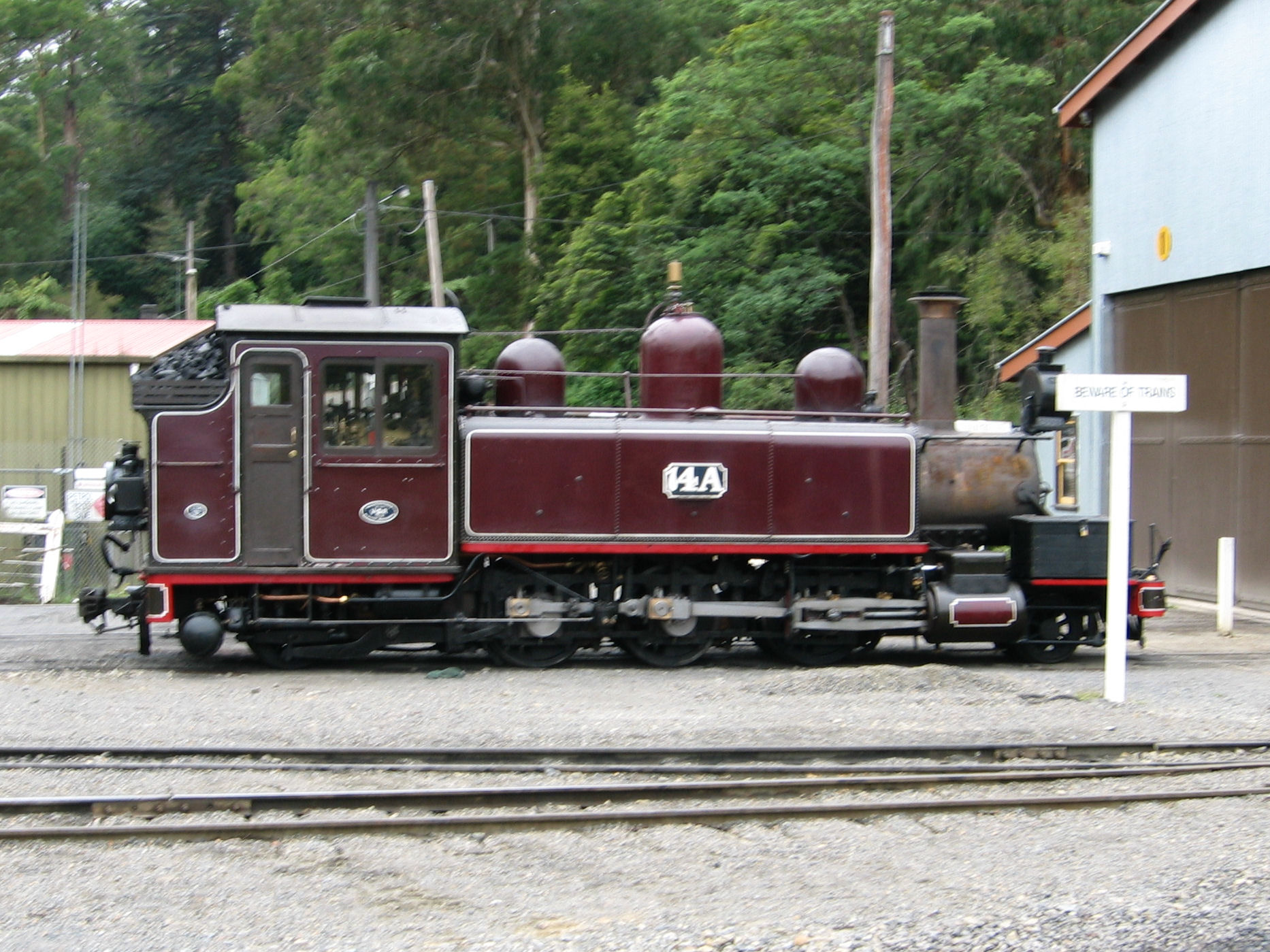
14A in crimson livery, stabled at Belgrave

14A had been transferred from Colac to Newport for repaint and repairs in the first week of April 1962, then arrived at Belgrave in 1965 after a repaint and repairs at Newport. In April 1974, it was taken for an unauthorised joyride to Selby at around midnight. It was intercepted by police and volunteers at Long Pockitt Lane. Later that same year 14A got fitted with electric headlights taken off ex-APC Fyansford Garratt No 2. Three years later on 1 October 1977, 14A along with 12A hauled the first train under the ownership of the Emerald Tourist Railway Board.

In 1979 14A was repainted in Canadian Pacific Red and Chocolate, a colour it bore into the early 1990s. In 1988 the Electric Headlights from No 2 were removed and the engine was fitted with standard VR Headlights. In 1995 it was repainted in a more accurate version of the CP Red Colour Scheme, and in 1998 it hauled the first official train to Gembrook in 45 years on 18 October. During a D exam from April to December 2004, 14A was fitted with a cowcatcher on the front bufferbeam, something which it hadn't had since the early 1940s.

In May 2006 it was placed on standby duties to prolong its serviceable life as it was due for a heavy overhaul. In July 2008 it was taken out of traffic and given top priority for its overhaul, and it was returned to traffic in March 2009 in all over black livery with its front cowcatcher being removed. For the next few years it became the backbone of operations on the Puffing Billy Railway until April 2017 when it was placed out of service for a D exam; during this D exam 14A was selected to be the engine fitted with oil firing to allow it to operate on the Lakeside Gembrook section in summer. The locomotive also received the Lempor exhaust system out of 6A in November 2017 for better performance. In March 2018 it began running test trains and it was officially placed back in traffic on 18 October 2018. It is currently in traffic.

== Fleet details ==
Engine	Builder's No.	Entered service	Withdrawn	Scrapped	Notes
1	15937	1 September 1898	11 February 1929	4 March 1929	Entered service on Whitfield line; withdrawn from Walhalla line
2	15938	1 September 1898	11 February 1929	4 March 1929	Entered service on Whitfield line, never operated on any other line.
3		4 June 1900	29 November 1955		Entered service on Gembrook line
4		13 June 1900	1933	26 September 1936	Entered service on Gembrook line; withdrawn from Whitfield line
5		23 March 1901		4 July 1958	Entered service on Beech Forest line
6		18 July 1901	1 October 1977		Entered service on Beech Forest line; last engine of class to enter service painted Brunswick Green
7		6 May 1905	1 October 1977		First engine of class to enter service painted Canadian Red
8		2 March 1908	28 January 1955		
9		8 January 1910		15 April 1954	
10		17 June 1911		18 May 1945	
11		18 November 1911		19 October 1953	
12		23 December 1912	1 October 1977		
13		25 June 1914		5 September 1958	
14		25 June 1914	1 October 1977		
15		30 March 1915		5 May 1954	
16		30 June 1915	1933	29 June 1936	
17		4 April 1916		26 September 1953	
18		Never built			
19		Never built			

== Replicas ==
A 10 1/4 in (260 mm) gauge replica of a NA class locomotive was built in 1993 for use on the Isle of Mull Railway. The engine, named "Victoria", was built by the Mouse Boiler Works, using drawings provided by the Puffing Billy Railway. It operated on the Isle of Mull until the railway's closure in 2011, and is currently operating on the Rudyard Lake Steam Railway.
