= Victorian Railways G class =

Steam locomotives introduced in 1925

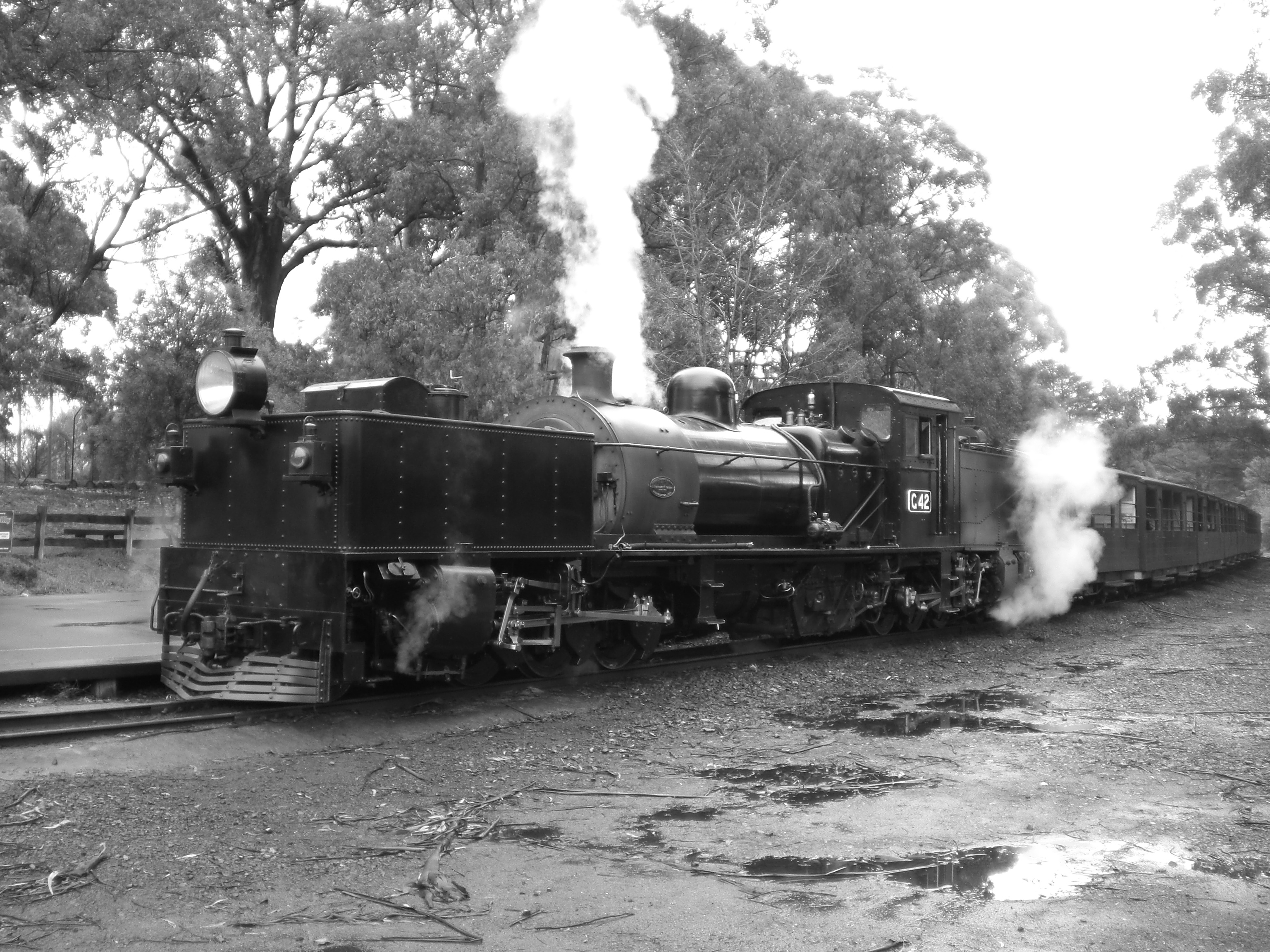
- G42 at Puffing Billy Railway in August 2007
Type and origin
- Power type: Steam
- Builder: Beyer, Peacock & Company
- Serial number: 6267–6268
- Build date: 1925
Specifications
- Configuration
  - Whyte: 2-6-0+0-6-2
- Gauge: 2 ft 6 in (762 mm)
- Leading dia.: 24.25 in (0.616 m)
- Driver dia.: 36 in (0.914 m)
- Wheelbase: 44 ft 6 in (13.56 m)
  - Engine: 12 ft 3 in (3.73 m) per engine unit
  - Drivers: 6 ft 9 in (2.06 m) per engine unit
- Pivot centres: 24 ft 9 in (7.54 m)
- Length
  - Over couplers: 49 ft 10 in (15.19 m)
- Width: 9 ft 1 in (2.77 m)
- Height: 10 ft 8 in (3.25 m)
- Frame type: Outside
- Axle load: 9.45 long tons (9.60 t; 10.58 short tons)
- Adhesive weight: 55.35 long tons (56.24 t; 61.99 short tons)
- Loco weight: 69 long tons (70 t; 77 short tons)
- Fuel type: Coal
- Fuel capacity: 3.5 long tons (3.6 t; 3.9 short tons)
- Water cap.: 1,250 imp gal (5,700 L; 1,500 US gal) front unit 430 imp gal (2,000 L; 520 US gal) rear unit 1,680 imp gal (7,600 L; 2,020 US gal) total
- Firebox
  - Grate area: 22.6 sq ft (2.10 m^{2})
- Boiler
  - Type: Belpaire firebox
- Boiler pressure: 180 psi (1.24 MPa)
- Heating surface
  - Firebox: 99 sq ft (9.2 m^{2})
  - Tubes and flues: 951 sq ft (88.4 m^{2})
  - Total surface: 1,230 sq ft (114 m^{2})
- Superheater
  - Type: Melesco
  - Heating area: 180 sq ft (17 m^{2})
- Cylinders: 4
- Cylinder size: 13 1/4 in × 18 in (337 mm × 457 mm)
- Valve gear: Walschaerts
- Train brakes: Westinghouse Air Brakes
- Safety systems: Flaman Speed Recorder
- Couplers: M.C.B. auto-couplers
Performance figures
- Tractive effort: 23,690 lbf (105.38 kN) at 75% pressure 26,850 lbf (119.43 kN) at 85% pressure
Career
- Operators: Victorian Railways, Puffing Billy Railway
- Number in class: 2
- Numbers: 41-42
- Preserved: 42
- Current owner: Puffing Billy Railway
- Above data is from Speed Limit 20 Plus.

The Victorian Railways G class is a class of steam locomotives built for the Victorian Railways 2 ft 6 in gauge branch lines by Beyer, Peacock & Company. They were introduced in 1926 to increase train sizes and reduce losses on these lines. Their tractive effort was comparable to the most powerful branch line locomotives on the Victorian Railways 5 ft 3 in (1,600 mm), the K class.

== Origins ==
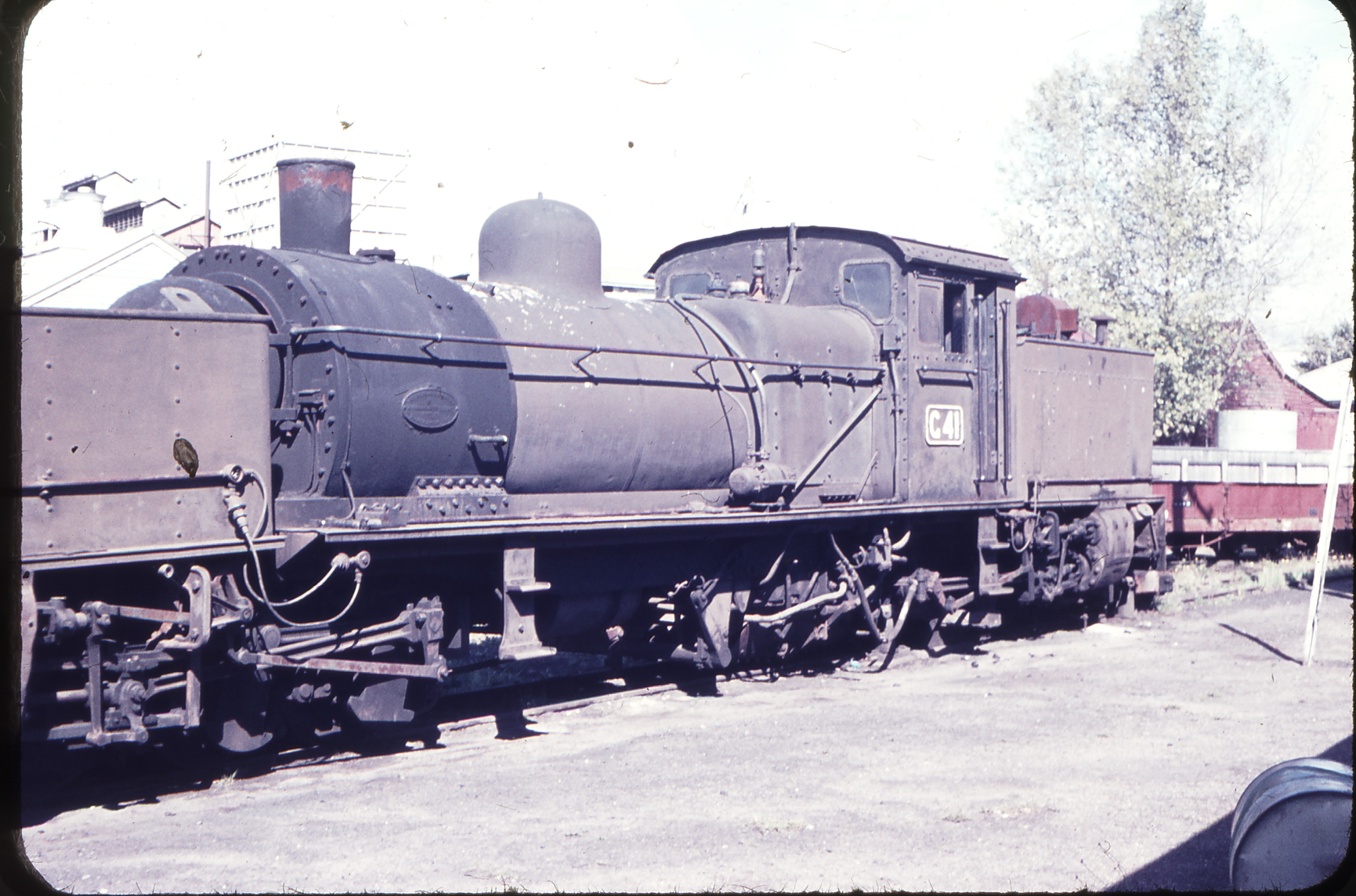
G41 stored at Colac in 1962

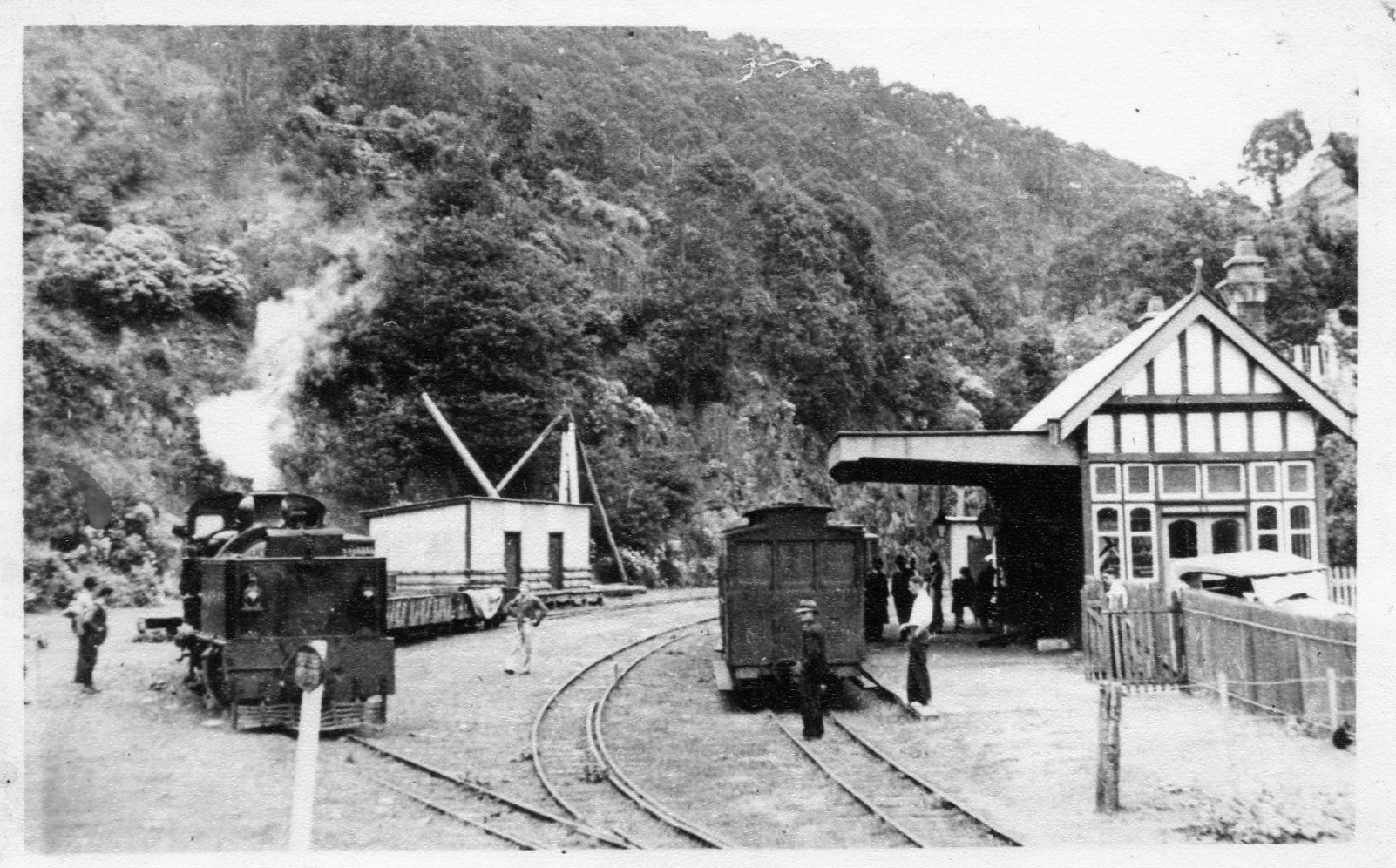
G42 at Walhalla station in 1926

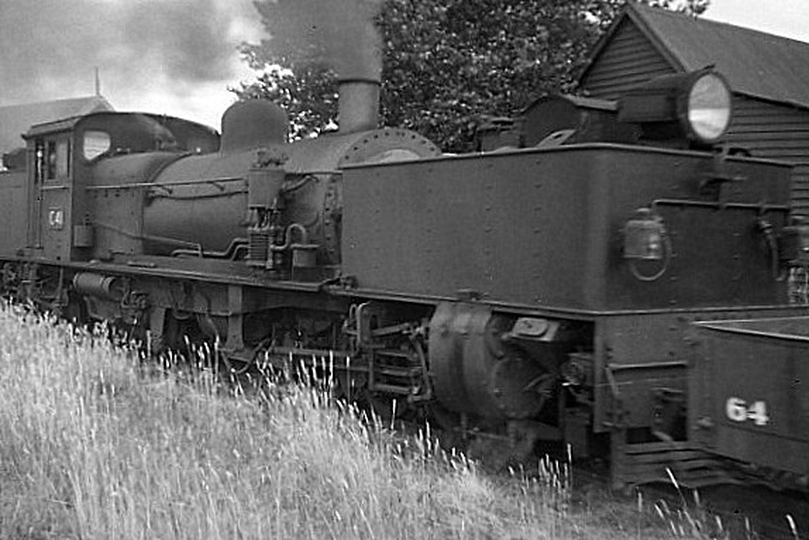
G41 Shunting NQR wagons at Colac 1959

The design was based on the earlier M and Ms class Garratts constructed for the Western Australian Government Railways. That design had been amongst the earliest of the Garratts, and first entered service in 1911. The major modification was the use of outside frames to allow for the reduction of gauge from 3 ft 6 in (1,067 mm) to 2 ft 6 in (762 mm). The design proved durable as two further examples were built for the Australian Portland Cement 3 ft 6 in (1,067 mm) gauge railway at Fyansford in the 1930s.

The two locomotives were built in 1925 with builders numbers 6267 and 6268 respectively and shipped to Australia, arriving at Newport Workshops in March 1926. G41 entered service on 5 June 1926, followed by G42 on 28 June 1926. On delivery, the Victorian Railways noted they expected an annual saving of £12,123 per year, and that therefore the savings would pay for the cost of the engines within two years.

Sometime after the engines were introduced it was found the cab of G42 was too short for one of the Walhalla drivers, Bob Rumpff, who was about 6 ft 1 in (1.85 m) tall, so the cab roof was raised to stop him injuring his head. The cab of G41 was similarly raised for standardisation, and the alteration was referred to as "Rumpff's Roof". Matching the design of the NA locomotives and the infrastructure on the narrow gauge lines, the Garratts were built with right-hand drive.

Unlike other locomotives and rolling stock, a special instruction was issued for the Garratts that when coupling, both the engine and wagon coupler jaws had to be in the open position rather than only one or the other, to prevent damage to the engine drawbars.

By September 1926 the estimated annual cost saving had increased from £12,123 in June to £12,173. The first two engines were purchased from overseas because this allowed their entry to service at least fifteen months earlier than if Newport had been given the task of construction, and the imported engines were £10,924 cheaper than local construction, essentially making the second engine free. However, a policy decision had been made that further Garratt engines would be built at Newport Workshops, contingent on a £2,750 royalty fee being paid to Beyer, Peacock & Co.

Between the superheated boiler, more than double the firebox grate area and more than 2.5 times the total heating surface, and four cylinders, a Garratt engine was 40 percent more fuel efficient than the NA class engines. Additionally, the increased water capacity allowed two water stops on the line between Colac and Beech Forest to be eliminated. The only noted negative was that the two engine units had to be set forward or reverse by one reversing wheel, which when combined with increased train lengths made the operation of Mixed trains less appealing.

== Working lives ==
The locomotives were allocated numbers G41 and G42. G41 was put to work on the Colac to Beech Forest and Crowes line, while G42 was placed on the Moe to Walhalla railway. The locomotives stayed on these lines, returning to Newport Workshops for heavy repairs when necessary.

Introduction of the Garratt locomotives allowed significantly longer and heavier trains to operate. Capacity on the Colac - Crowes line was as below, e.g. a single NA locomotive could haul 16 vehicles or a maximum of 85 tons (including the weight of the wagons) between Colac and Barongarook. In 1922 the line had a daily return service scheduled for the whole length, plus another one on Mondays and Thursdays between Beech Forest and Colac, and a number of other trains built into the schedule if required. By 1933, between the introduction of the Garratt and reduction in traffic due to the depression, this had fallen to three trains per week Colac to Beech Forest, only two of those continuing to Crowes, plus a postal motor in the opposite direction to the steam train.

Crowes loads	DOWN				UP			
Section	NA		Garratt		NA		Garratt	
Colac	Read downwards				16	120	20	255 long tons (259 t; 286 short tons)
Barongarook	16	85 long tons (86 t; 95 short tons)	20	200 long tons (200 t; 220 short tons)	16	120	20	270 long tons (270 t; 300 short tons)
Gellibrand	16	136 long tons (138 t; 152 short tons)	20	200 long tons (200 t; 220 short tons)	14	120	20	270 long tons (270 t; 300 short tons)
Beech Forest	13	70 long tons (71 t; 78 short tons)	20	140 long tons (140 t; 160 short tons)	14	120	20	255 long tons (259 t; 286 short tons)
Wyelangta	14	90 long tons (91 t; 100 short tons)	20	180 long tons (180 t; 200 short tons)	14	120	20	255 long tons (259 t; 286 short tons)
Crowes	14	120 long tons (120 t; 130 short tons)	20	255 long tons (259 t; 286 short tons)	Read upwards			

Similarly, train capacity increased significantly when G42 was introduced on the Walhalla line:

Walhalla loads	NA locomotives				Garratt			
	Mixed		Goods		Mixed		Goods	
Moe to Erica	10	60 long tons (61 t; 67 short tons)	14	80 long tons (81 t; 90 short tons)	18 or 22	180 long tons (180 t; 200 short tons) or 140 long tons (140 t; 160 short tons)	24	60 long tons (61 t; 67 short tons)
Erica to Walhalla	10	60 long tons (61 t; 67 short tons)	12	80 long tons (81 t; 90 short tons)	12	60 long tons (61 t; 67 short tons)	24	60 long tons (61 t; 67 short tons)
Walhalla to Erica	10	55 long tons (56 t; 62 short tons)	12	70 long tons (71 t; 78 short tons)	12	60 long tons (61 t; 67 short tons)	24	60 long tons (61 t; 67 short tons)
Erica to Moe	10	110 long tons (110 t; 120 short tons)	16	110 long tons (110 t; 120 short tons)	18	60 long tons (61 t; 67 short tons)	24	60 long tons (61 t; 67 short tons)

Introduction of the Garratt locomotives with their M.C.B. couplers required transition of the rest of the narrow gauge fleet from the earlier "Chopper" style couplers to match. The Garratts could not have been fitted with the earlier type of coupler, because their extra power would have exceeded the force those were designed to withstand.

The engines ran more or less unaltered until 1941, when G41 had its chimney replaced with a "stove-pipe" style unit, and G42 in 1955. In 1958 both engines were fitted with electric generators and lighting, including front and rear headlights, marker lights and cab interior lighting. The cowcatchers were later removed from G42.

G42 was noted for its absence (due to regular rostered maintenance at Newport Workshops) on the "Return to Walhalla" Australia Day special trains on the Walhalla line, which forced the first operation of double-headed NA class locomotives beyond Erica.

A typical journey worked by G42 on the Moe to Erica mixed train was recorded by Ted Downs in 1954, with numerous photographs in "A day in the life of G 42" (P.B.P.S. 2001).

After the closure of the Walhalla line in 1955 G42 was moved west to Colac, where it worked the line in conjunction with G41. Both engines were used on special excursion trains from 1959 to 1962, using eight NBH carriages which had previously operated on the Gembrook line.

In the final months of the line G41 was out of use, having been cannibalised for parts (including its chimney) to keep G42 working. G42 hauled the last regular train on the Colac line on 27 June 1962, and the last tour train on 30 June 1962. The engine, and the line, were both taken out of service because that was when G42's boiler certificate was due to expire.

== Maintenance ==
The Victorian Railways' locomotive maintenance schedule specified types of exams by letter, e.g. "A", "B", "C", "D" and "E" exams, sometimes with number suffices, or combined.

NA class locomotives were required to undergo an "A" exam every month if they had not run at least 1,500 miles (2,400 km). The "A" exam required checking the wheels, tyres, axles and frames, flange lubricators and turbo generators, as well as lubricating of the intermediate (radial type) buffers.

At 3,000 miles (4,800 km) intervals or every two months (Note: AB exams were every six weeks for broad gauge engines) an "AB" exam was conducted, checking the axles and cranks, whole of the brake system including blocks, hangers, brackets and reservoirs, and dismantling the feed valve for cleaning; the engine frame and cylinder castings would also be checked for cracks, and the coupled axlebox clearances would be checked with feelers and the wedges adjusted if necessary. The boiler would be reviewed with tubes examined, stays and fusible plugs checked and replaced if necessary, brick arch, baffle plate and firehole door among other elements would be reviewed; if the brick arch was removed then the stays it was resting on would be hammer-tested as well. The ashpan operating gear and smokebox seal and spark arrestors would also be checked, along with the main steam pipe and boiler mountings like the injectors being removed for inspection and cleaning. All oil trimmings would be replaced, and the sanding gear resecured if necessary.

The "ABC" exam was at 12,000 miles (19,000 km) or annual intervals (9,000 miles (14,000 km) for the Garratt and S Class pacific locomotives), with all the above checked plus additional reviews of the braking system pipework and feed systems, hand brakes, cylinder rods, pistons and cocks, motion and valve gear, boiler safety valves, gauges calibrating and brackets resecured, and excessive smoke box carbon buildup would be burned out.

The "ABCD" exam was at 24,000 miles (39,000 km) or biannual intervals (18,000 miles (29,000 km) for the Garratt and S Class pacific locomotives), with all the above checked plus the drawgear (couplers and connections) being checked. The "ABCE" exam was at 36,000 miles (58,000 km) or four year intervals (27,000 miles (43,000 km) for the Garratt and S Class pacific locomotives), and added the eccentric valve gear and axlebox inspections along with axleboxe wool rolls and the engine brake pipes being completely replaced.

Finally, the "ABCDE" exam was at 72,000 miles (116,000 km), without a timeline specified (54,000 miles (87,000 km) for the Garratt and S Class pacific locomotives), and required the engine to be lifted from its wheels (or placed over a drop pit to lower the wheels from the axleboxes), with all associated fittings reviewed and renewed as necessary.

== Disposal and preservation ==
After closure of the narrow gauge line from Colac, the whole of G42 and the engine units of G41 were removed to Newport Workshops, while the boiler unit of G41 was sent to Ballarat North Workshops and scrapped in 1962. The engine units of G41 were scrapped in October 1964, though the number plates, whistle and headlights were recovered and are housed at the Menzies Creek Museum. G42 was purchased from the Victorian Railways in July 1964 by the Puffing Billy Preservation Society, being transferred by rail to Belgrave in January 1968 and arriving at the Menzies Creek Steam Museum on 10 February 1968. The museum also acquired one of the Australian Portland Cement Garratts along with an unused spare boiler.

In 1978 a decision was made to restore G42, with an appeal for funds opening in June 1979 and the task completed in April 2004. The spare boiler from Australian Portland Cement was used instead of G42's original boiler as this had had its copper inner fire-box and boiler tubes removed by the V.R. before sale to the Puffing Billy Preservation Society in 1963. G42 was withdrawn from service in February 2009 pending a "D" exam as part of the Puffing Billy Railway's regular maintenance program. On 16 August 2009, G42 returned to service for one day only to celebrate "100 years of the Garratt locomotive design" with a special to Cockatoo and return before returning to storage pending the mentioned "D" exam.

On 12 December 2010, G42 moved under its own steam after extensive repairs including turning more than 1 in (25 mm) from the wheel tyres. It was put to a test with a difficult shunt of 20 cars into different roads. The locomotive was then used on the "Green time table" service which otherwise calls for the double heading of NA class locomotives on one of the trips, enabling its greater hauling capacity to substitute for the two NAs.

As of April 2023, G42 is on display in the Menzies Creek Museum "for a period of at least five years".
