= Narrow-gauge lines of the Victorian Railways =

Early to mid 1900s railway system in Victoria, Australia

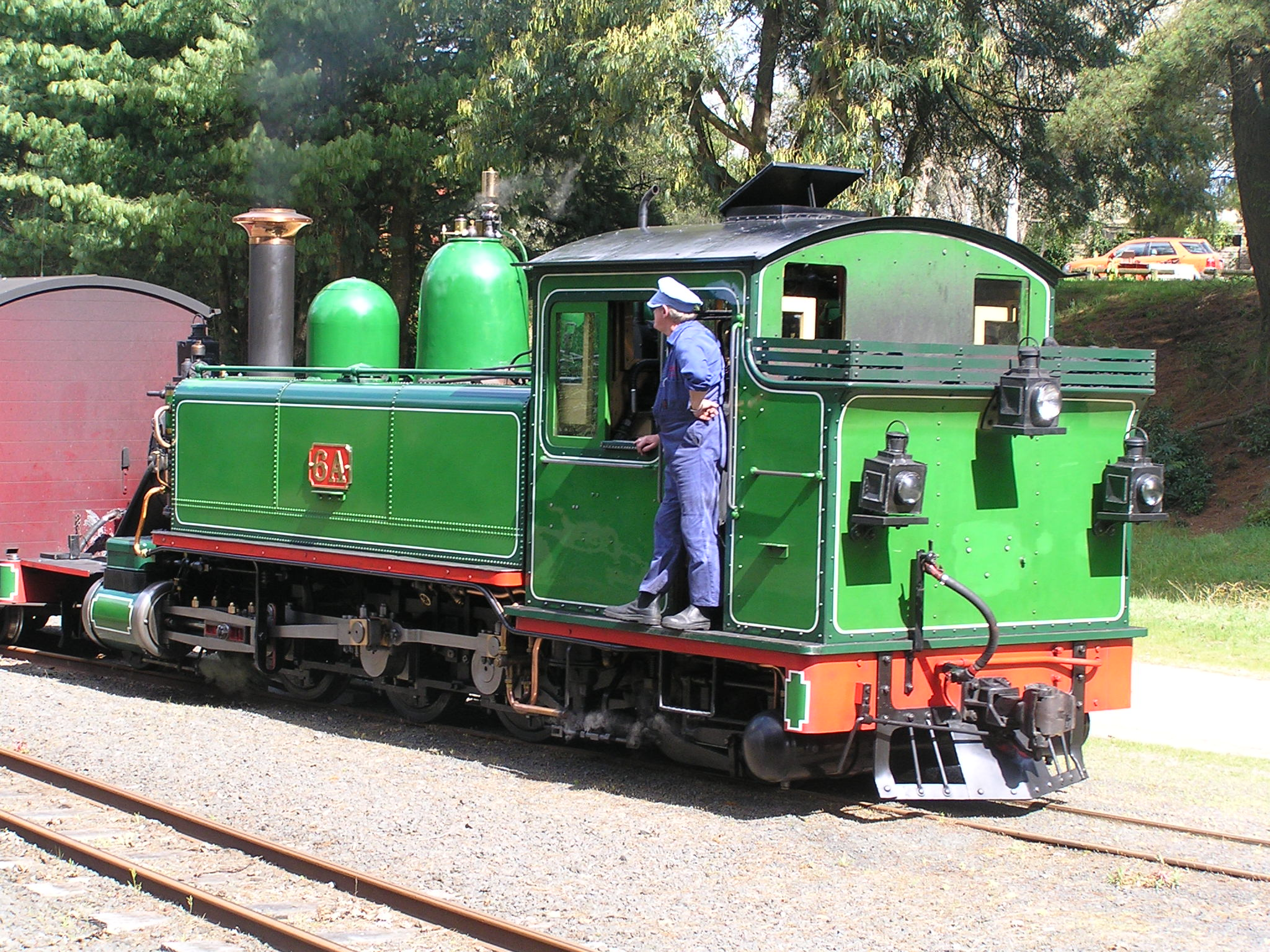
NA class locomotive 6A, preserved on the Puffing Billy Railway in the original green livery used by the Victorian Railways until 1903. Photographed at Gembrook in 2006.

The former Victorian Railways, the state railway authority in Victoria, Australia, built a number of experimental 2 ft 6 in (762 mm) narrow-gauge lines around the beginning of the 20th century. Although all were closed by the early 1960s, parts of two have been reopened as heritage railways.

== Background ==
A depression in the early 1890s brought a halt to the rapid expansion of railways in Victoria. Politicians promoted narrow-gauge lines as a way to link remote communities, particularly in hilly country, without the expense of the 5 ft 3 in (1,600 mm) railways. Railway officials opposed them, citing the inconvenience and expense of a break-of-gauge.

The Parliamentary Standing Committee on Railways examined 14 regions for potential railways:

1. Bass River District: Without recommending a specific route, the Committee considered a narrow gauge line through the Bass River district to exploit timber resources along the river, coal deposits around Kilcunda and farming around Wonthaggi, eventually recommending examination a low cost broad gauge option. Instead the Wonthaggi railway line was built as broad gauge in 1910.
2. Beech Forest District: From Colac to Beech Forest.
3. Carrajung District: From Traralgon to Alberton via Carrajung.
4. Gembrook District: From Ferntree Gully to Gembrook.
5. Gunbower and Cohuna District: From Rochester or Elmore to Gunbower or Cohuna. Instead the Cohuna railway line was built as broad gauge in 1915.
6. King River District: From Wangaratta to Whitfield.
7. McDonald's Track District: From Nyora or Monomeith to Thorpdale. The broad gauge Strzelecki railway line partly covered this district in 1922.
8. Mitta Mitta River District: From Tallangatta to Eskdale.
9. Moondarra and Walhalla District: From Moe to Walhalla.
10. Orbost and Snowy River District: An isolated line from Cunninghame to Orbost as an alternative to proposed extension of the broad gauge Gippsland line from Bairnsdale to Orbost via Bruthen. Instead the broad gauge line was extended to Orbost in 1916.
11. Poowong East District: From Drouin or Warragul to Korumburra via Poowong.
12. Tolmie District: The Committee stated that the suggested line to Whitfield must, at some future time, be extended to Tolmie and Mansfield.
13. Upper Murray District: Tallangatta to Cudgwea and Towong, or from Bethanga to Walwa. Instead the broad gauge railway from Tallangatta was extended to Cudgewa between 1916 and 1921.
14. Wandin and Warburton District: From Croydon to Warburton.

In considering the McDonald's Track and Poowong East Districts together, the committee also examined shorter routes from the existing Thorpdale railway line and Mirboo North railway line to Leongatha.

The Committee recommended that four experimental lines be built. They were:

- Croydon to Warburton
- Wangaratta to Whitfield
- Upper Ferntree Gully to Gembrook
- Colac to Beech Forest

The Warburton line was built in broad gauge, however authority was given for the construction of the other three lines. Subsequently, a further two lines were built, the Moe to Walhalla line, and an extension from Beech Forest to Crowes.

Initial plans were for the railways to be constructed in 2 ft (610 mm) gauge, but following correspondence with British railway engineer Everard Calthrop, amongst others, a change was made to 2 ft 6 in (762 mm) gauge.

None of the lines constructed ever made a profit. Freight rates were the same for broad and narrow-gauge railways, despite higher direct costs. Most of the loadings were goods such as timber, potatoes and lime, which were charged at a low rate. Most freight was outbound, so many trains travelled towards the terminals almost empty. And despite originating the traffic, the lines were only credited with a portion of the freight charge. The amount credited to the lines did not cover the cost of running trains, and the more traffic the larger the loss. However, particularly in the 1920s, the traffic generated by the narrow-gauge lines was appreciated by the railways and the lines survived for up to 60 years before closure.

== Operations ==
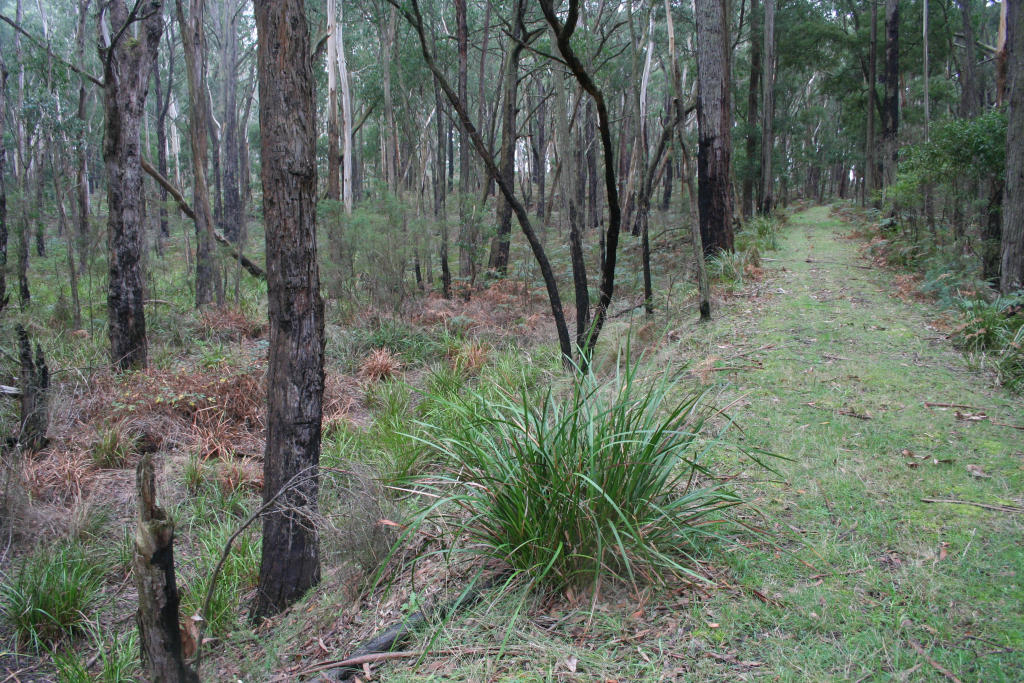
Embankment on the Colac – Beech Forest line

=== Alignments ===
A number of studies were made of overseas narrow-gauge railways such as the Darjeeling Himalayan Railway in India and the Ffestiniog Railway in Wales. An initial decision to build the lines in 2 ft (610 mm) gauge was changed to 2 ft 6 in (762 mm) gauge for the Victorian lines. This gauge was being adopted on other lines in the British Empire at this time, such as the Kalka-Shimla Railway and the Sierra Leone Government Railway. The railways were constructed using 60 lb/yd (29.8 kg/m) rail, initially obtained from broad-gauge lines that were being upgraded. A maximum grade of 1 in 30 (3.33%) was adopted, while the minimum radius of curves was 2 chains i.e. 132 feet (40 m).

=== Safeworking ===
Apart from a couple of experiments with other systems, all lines were operated by the Staff and Ticket method of safeworking, as was standard Victorian Railways practice for this system.

=== Loading gauge ===
The maximum dimensions for rolling stock, when loaded, on the narrow gauge lines was 9 ft 6 in (2.90 m) from the railhead at the centreline, decreasing to 9 ft (2.7 m) at the sides; the maximum width was 6 ft (1.8 m) up to 1 foot 9 inches (0.53 m) from the wagon floor (3 ft 9.75 in (1.1621 m) from the railhead), with an extra 6 inches (150 mm) either side permitted above that height.

=== Vehicle weights ===
In 1916, 1926 and 1939 (among other years), weights for various train consist arrangements were published. The assumption was that each passenger carriage would weigh an additional 2 long tons (2.0 t) when fully loaded.

Weight (plus goods load)	Empty, on goods train	On Passenger or Mixed train
NC	7.5 long tons (7.6 t)	7.5 long tons (7.6 t)
NAB, NB with lavatory	9 long tons (9.1 t)	11 long tons (11 t)
NB saloon	7 long tons (7.1 t)	9 long tons (9.1 t)
NB compartment	9 long tons (9.1 t)	11 long tons (11 t)
NBC	8 long tons (8.1 t)	10 long tons (10 t)
NBH	5 long tons (5.1 t)	7 long tons (7.1 t)
NQR with canopy and seats	6 long tons (6.1 t)	8 long tons (8.1 t) by 1916; 7 long tons (7.1 t) by 1926
NQR / NQ	4 long tons (4.1 t)	4 long tons (4.1 t)
NUU / NU	7 long tons (7.1 t)	7 long tons (7.1 t)
NMM / NM	7.5 long tons (7.6 t)	7.5 long tons (7.6 t)
NTT / NT	7.5 long tons (7.6 t)	7.5 long tons (7.6 t)
NH	8 long tons (8.1 t)	8 long tons (8.1 t)
NQ 61, 72, 74, 79, 80 (sheep frame)	5 long tons (5.1 t) by 1926; 6 long tons (6.1 t) by 1939	5 long tons (5.1 t) by 1926; 6 long tons (6.1 t) by 1939

== Locomotives and rolling stock ==
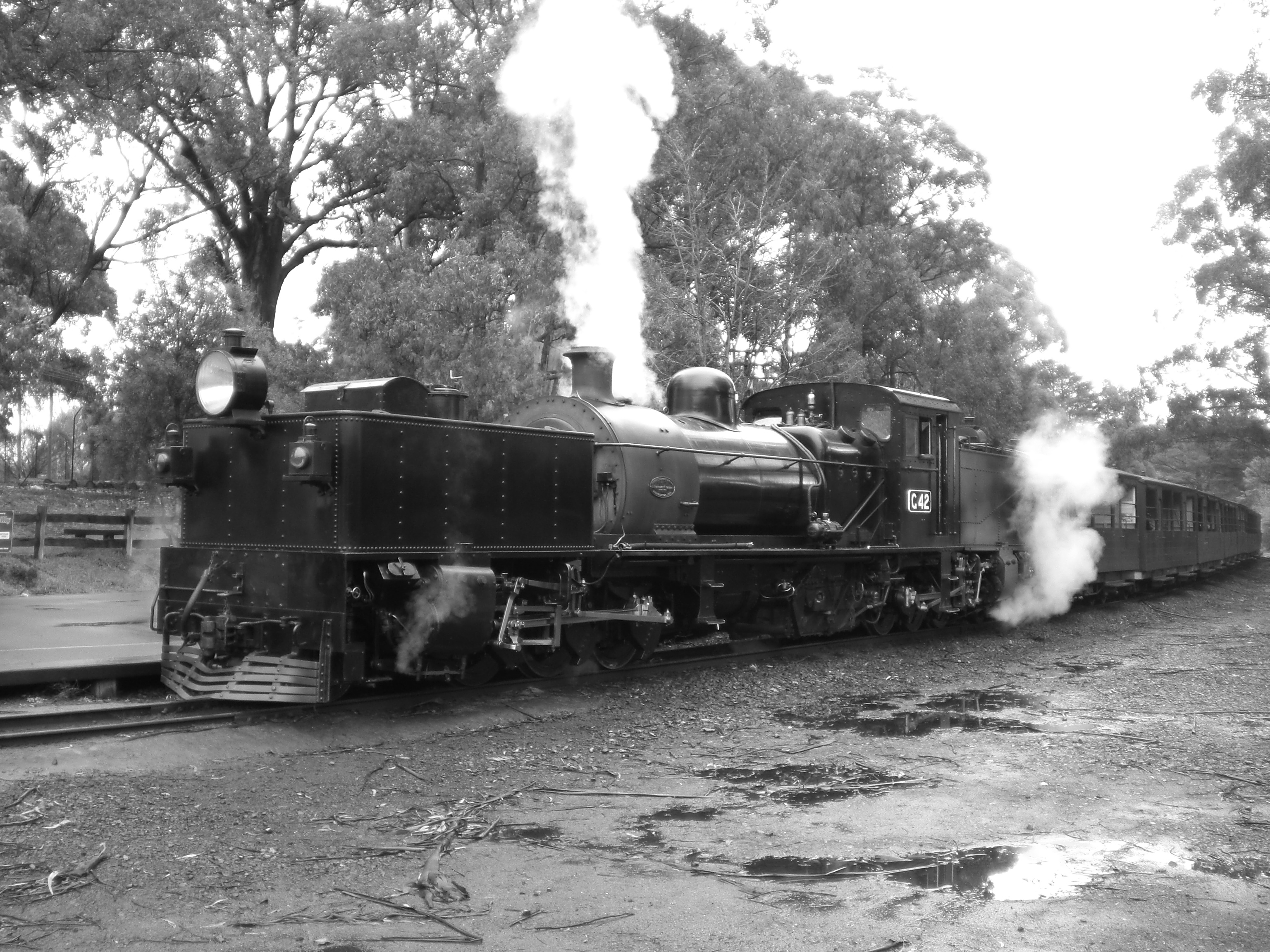
Restored Garratt G42 on the Puffing Billy Railway

Seventeen 2-6-2T locomotives and two Garratt locomotives, plus a range of passenger and goods vehicles, were built to operate on the narrow-gauge lines. Six of the locomotives, including one of the Garratt locomotives, as well as at least one example of each type of rolling stock, have been restored to working order on the Puffing Billy Railway.

Apart from light maintenance that could be done locally, the locomotives and rolling stock were maintained at the Victorian Railways' Newport Workshops in the suburbs of Melbourne, requiring the transport of the vehicles by broad-gauge flat wagons. The locomotives and other vehicles would be moved around the various narrow-gauge lines as appropriate, so that no equipment was dedicated to particular lines. However the G class Garratts were only used on the Crowes and Walhalla lines, while the NBH excursion coaches remained on the Gembrook line while that line was in operation.

=== Parameters ===
The trains were all fitted with Westinghouse air brakes and, originally, with chopper couplers. In the mid-1920s the couplers were replaced with small MCB, or "knuckle" couplers.

=== Locomotives ===
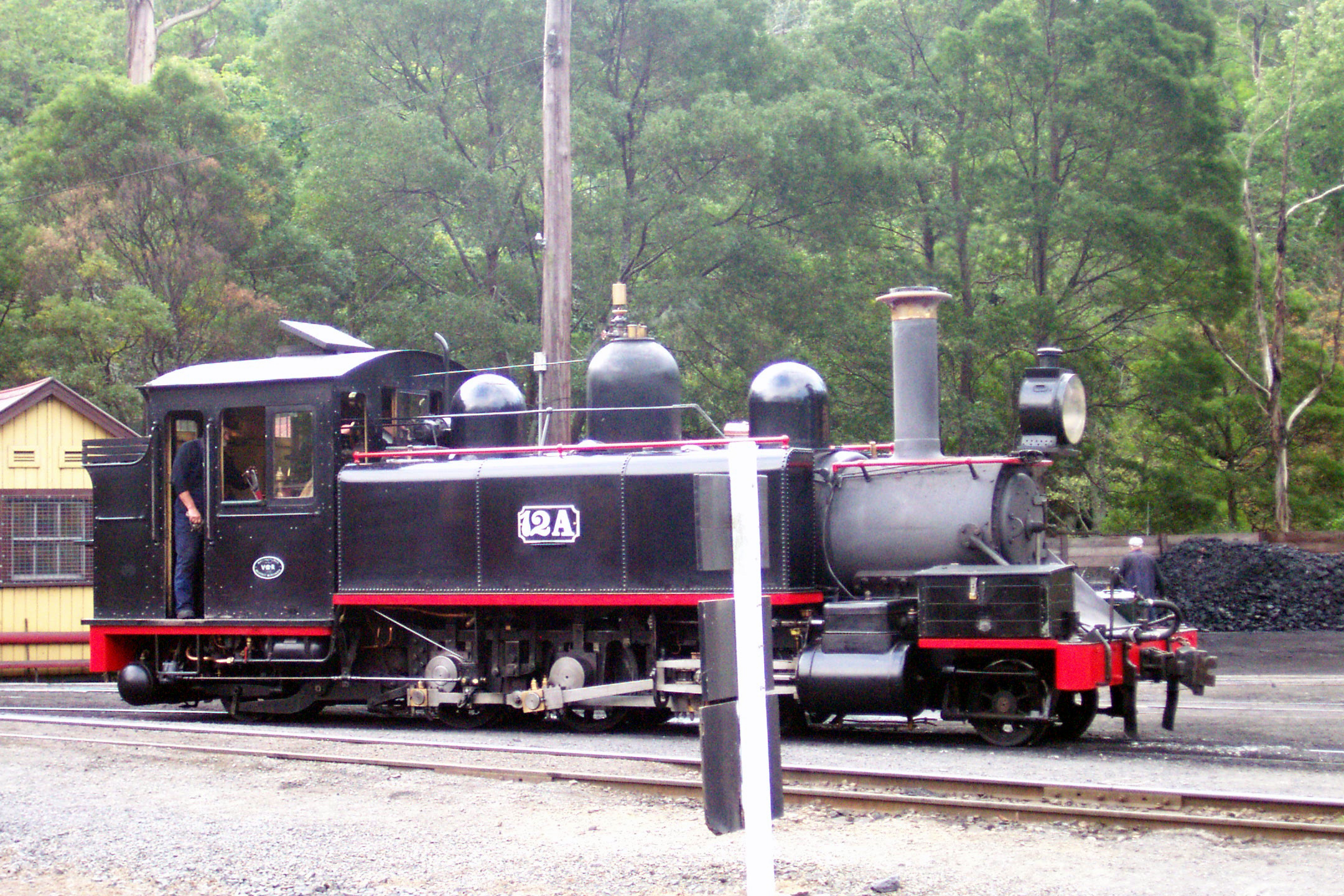
NA locomotive No. 12, in the Black with Red livery used in the early preservation era, at Belgrave on the Puffing Billy Railway.

Baldwin Locomotive Works in the United States supplied the first two 2-6-2T locomotives, as well as parts for a further two locos. One each of the supplied locos and the parts kits was a simple loco, and the other a compound. The new class was classed "A", however confusion with the broad-gauge A, AA and A2 classes led to them being referred to as narrow-gauge A class for a short while, with a prefix "N" being applied to written records, making it the NA class. Victorian Railways' Newport Workshops assembled the parts to give an additional two locos, and subsequently built a further 13 of the simple cylinder version. The last one, number 17, was built in 1915.

The locomotives weigh 36 long tons (36.6 t; 40.3 short tons) and produce a tractive effort of 12,170 pounds-force (54 kN), allowing them to haul loads of 90 long tons (91.4 t; 100.8 short tons) up grades of 1 in 30 (3.33%). Nos. 6, 7, 8, 12, and 14 have been restored and operate on the Puffing Billy Railway, and No. 3 is also on the Puffing Billy Railway, awaiting eventual restoration. The remaining locomotives have all been scrapped.

By the mid-1920s, traffic was growing with up to 7 trains a day on the Beech Forest line. To decrease train mileage and therefore costs, two G class Garratt locomotives were purchased from Beyer, Peacock & Company in England. Weighing 69 tons (70.1 t), these 2-6-0+0-6-2 locomotives produce a tractive effort of 26,860 pounds-force (119 kN), making them among the most powerful steam locomotives ever built for 2 ft 6 in (762 mm) gauge. They were designated as the "G" class and given the numbers 41 and 42, and entered service in 1926. G41 spent its entire life on the Crowes line, whilst G42 was originally allocated to the Walhalla line, then transferred to the Crowes line, and is currently running on the Puffing Billy Railway. G41 was scrapped, after having been extensively cannibalised for parts to keep G42 running in the last years of the Crowes line.

=== Rolling stock ===
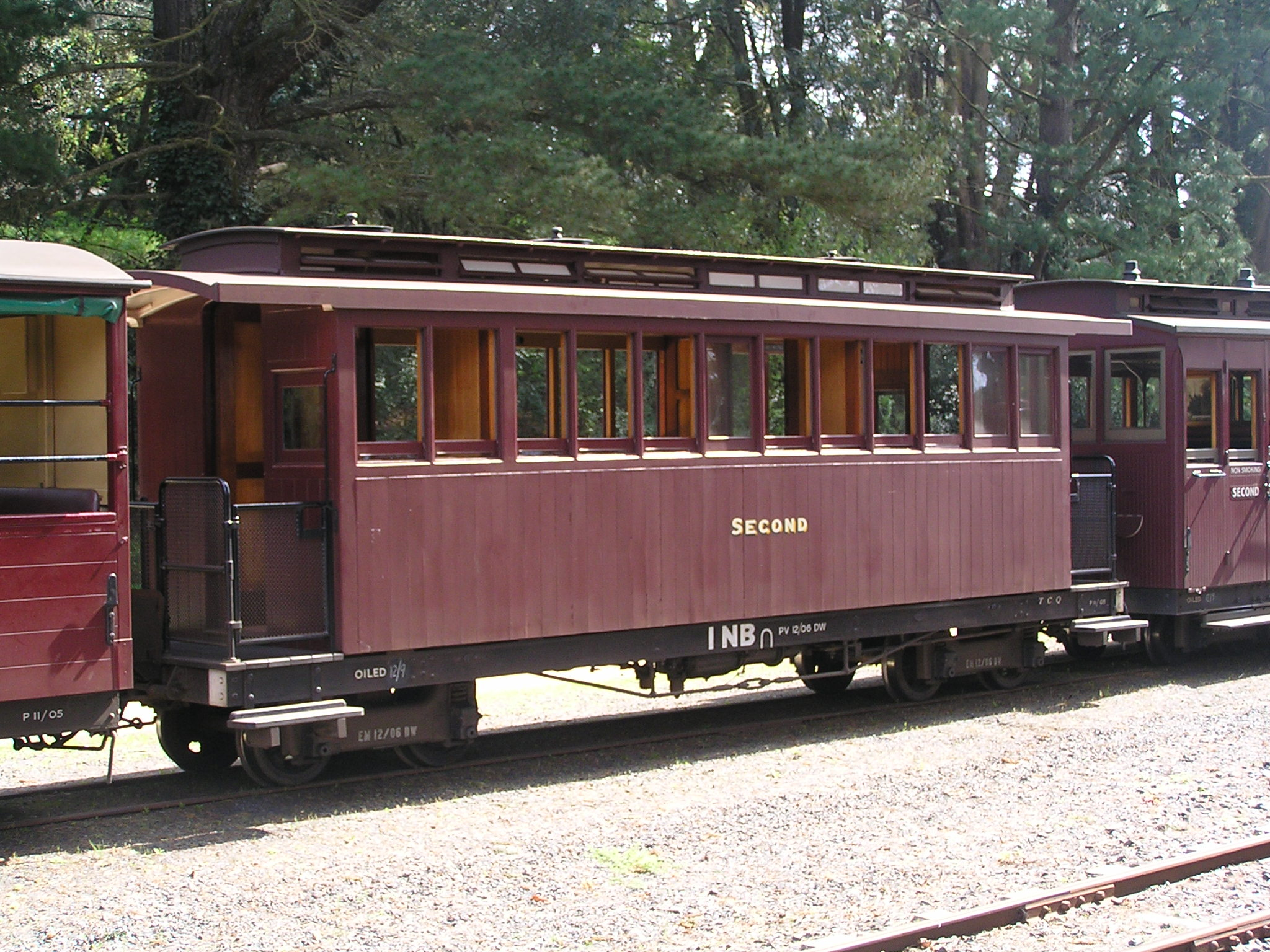
1NB, the first passenger carriage used on the Victorian narrow gauge, preserved on the Puffing Billy railway and restored to 1910 condition

A range of passenger and goods vehicles were also built at Newport or by contractors. While most Victorian Railways broad-gauge goods vehicles of the time were 4 wheel trucks, all the narrow-gauge rolling stock were bogie vehicles and most were built on a standard underframe.

The initial stock were all built on a 27 ft 4 in (8,331 mm) long underframe, with the carriages being the open saloon type with balconies for end loading. Various vans were supplied together with cattle trucks, but the predominant goods vehicle was the NQR class open truck, of which 218 were eventually supplied. Later some 31 ft 4 in (9,550 mm) side opening carriages were built to cope with increasing traffic. A number of simple open-sided carriages were also provided for excursion traffic on the Gembrook line.

=== Transfer between workshops and lines ===
Initially, rolling stock delivered from Newport Workshops was loaded on regular flat wagons, secured in place and railed to loading points at Wangaratta, Upper Ferntree Gully, Colac and Moe, unloaded, tested and brought into use.

Locomotive transfers were somewhat more complex. For the first thirty years or so, the process for transferring the NA class locomotives between sites required a pair of custom diamond-frame bogies with extended centre pins. The locomotives would be lifted by cranes (at Newport) or pushed along the loading ramps while supported by jacks (at the outer depots). While suspended the locomotive bogies were removed, and the broad gauge bogie king pins were installed in the leading truck swivel pin hole and the trailing truck's centre control pin hole. The cowcatchers, chopper couplers and whistle were all removed (the latter due to loading gauge limits), and temporary wooden headstocks were fitted to the locomotives with screw couplers and buffers for coupling to adjacent I or QR type wagons (which would also carry assorted tools and fittings, including the leading and trailing trucks). In this state the narrow gauge locomotive was functionally a regular goods wagon, through-piped with Westinghouse air brake but without its own brakes.

At Newport Workshops there was only limited space for shunting, so when an engine's maintenance was complete it had to be lifted from the short local length of narrow gauge track by crane onto its transfer bogies. At the terminal station the engine would be jacked up, with a timber support structure placed under the driving wheels as a safety precaution while the broad gauge bogies were disconnected and removed. Then the engine would be lowered onto the narrow gauge trucks, and when complete all the assorted suspension systems, cowcatchers and other fittings would be reconnected and restored. The engine was then lit up and given a test run in the yard; on completion the new engine would enter service on the line, and another engine scheduled for maintenance would take its place in the return trip to Newport.

Trains including locomotives for transfer were restricted to 20 to 30 mph (32 to 48 km/h) and accompanied by a repair crew in case of an incident en route, while the rest of the team followed on the next morning's passenger train to the same destination.

==== Q129 ====
Q129 is a 5 ft 3 in (1,600 mm) broad gauge wagon built in June 1926, initially to transfer the Garratt locomotives' engine units (Note: The Garratt boiler unit was transferred separately, loaded by cranes in a QB well wagon.) from Newport to Colac and Moe, and later used for the NA class engines as well.

The wagon was of a skeletal design, with raised beams 2 ft 6 in (762 mm) apart specifically for the transport of the Victorian Railways' narrow gauge locomotives. To facilitate this, the vehicle was fitted with hinged buffers at both ends which could be lowered out of the way, allowing the deck "rails" to meet the raised ramps at each of the transfer sites. The deck of the wagon was lower than a normal flat truck, to ensure that the whole of a loaded narrow gauge engine would be within the broad gauge dimension limits. Anchors were provided to clamp the load in position, and chains and shackles were also used.

Q129 was long enough to take both the engine units of a Garratt, or one NA class locomotive. The sequence of disassembling, transferring and reassembling a Garratt engine took about three days.

The vehicle was condemned in 1979 and sold to the Emerald Tourist Railway Board. It has since been cosmetically restored and is now a static display inside Menzies Creek Museum display shed. While the wagon was originally fitted with standard barframe bogies, it was later refitted with bogies recovered from the tender of locomotive V499.

It is now preserved at the Menzies Creek Steam Museum adjacent to Menzies Creek railway station on the Puffing Billy Railway.

=== Maintenance ===
A range of trollys and tricycles were prepared for the narrow gauge lines, similar to the broad gauge equivalents but adapted to the narrower track gauge and with an "N" prefix added to their codes. These vehicles were used for maintenance and also for postal services if required by the Postal Department and local Postmaster, on behalf of the Postmaster General.

There were four classes of trollys, A, B, C^{1} and C^{2} types, with N-suffixes for the narrow gauge equivalents. The A Type Heavy Trolly did not have a narrow gauge equivalent; the Medium Trolly B_{N} was about 6 ft (1.8 m) long and rode on cast iron wheels at 3 ft 4 in (1.02 m) spacing. The Light Trolly C^{1}_{N} type ("Old Pattern") rode on five-spoked, cast-iron wheels at 2 ft 6 in (0.76 m) centres and was a little over 5 ft (1.5 m) long, while the new pattern C^{2}_{N} had wooden wheels with steel tyres at 2 ft (0.61 m) centres and the platform between the wheels was 3 ft (0.91 m) long.

Tricycles were designed with the outrigger guiding wheel on an adjustable brace, and the wheel flange was intended to be placed about a quarter-inch from the rail. The types were E, F, and G, or E_{N}, F_{N} and G_{N} for narrow gauge, respectively types with teeth gearing, chain gearing, or chain gearing plus a cord to the brake handle respectively.

By 1939 additional types of maintenance vehicles had been introduced, the Sheffield and Casey Jones "K" and the Casey Jones "KS" and "NKS". By this time, mail services had a maximum load for a B type single-cylinder trolley (Note: By 1939 the spelling had changed from "trolly" to "trolley".) of 3 long hundredweight (150 kg) inclusive of the weight of the driver; for the KS and NKS it was 6 long hundredweight (300 kg), and for the K type 10 long hundredweight (510 kg) The loading was to be distributed to minimise the weight on the outrigger wheel, and had to be prioritised in order of letters first, parcels, daily newspapers and finally weekly newspapers, if there was insufficient capacity.

== Lines ==
=== Wangaratta to Whitfield ===
The first line, from Wangaratta to Whitfield, was unlike the other lines in that it was built through mostly flat, open, agricultural country, following the King River. The 30.5-mile (49.1 km) line was built as a narrow-gauge line because it was thought that it might be extended into the mountainous country to the south, but this extension never happened. The line was opened in March 1899, and was the first line to close, in October 1953. The line relied mostly on local agricultural traffic, and opened with a daily mixed train. By the 1930s this had been reduced to a weekly goods service, and stayed at this level until the railway closed. There was only one lineside industry, a dairy at Moyhu, and the majority of stations were nameboards at road crossings.

==== List of stations ====
- Wangaratta (Junction station with broad gauge.)
- Targoora
- Laceby
- Oxley
- Skehan
- Docker
- Byrne
- Moyhu
- Angleside
- Claremont
- Dwyer
- Edi
- Hyem
- King Valley
- Jarrott
- Pieper
- Whitfield

=== Upper Ferntree Gully to Gembrook ===
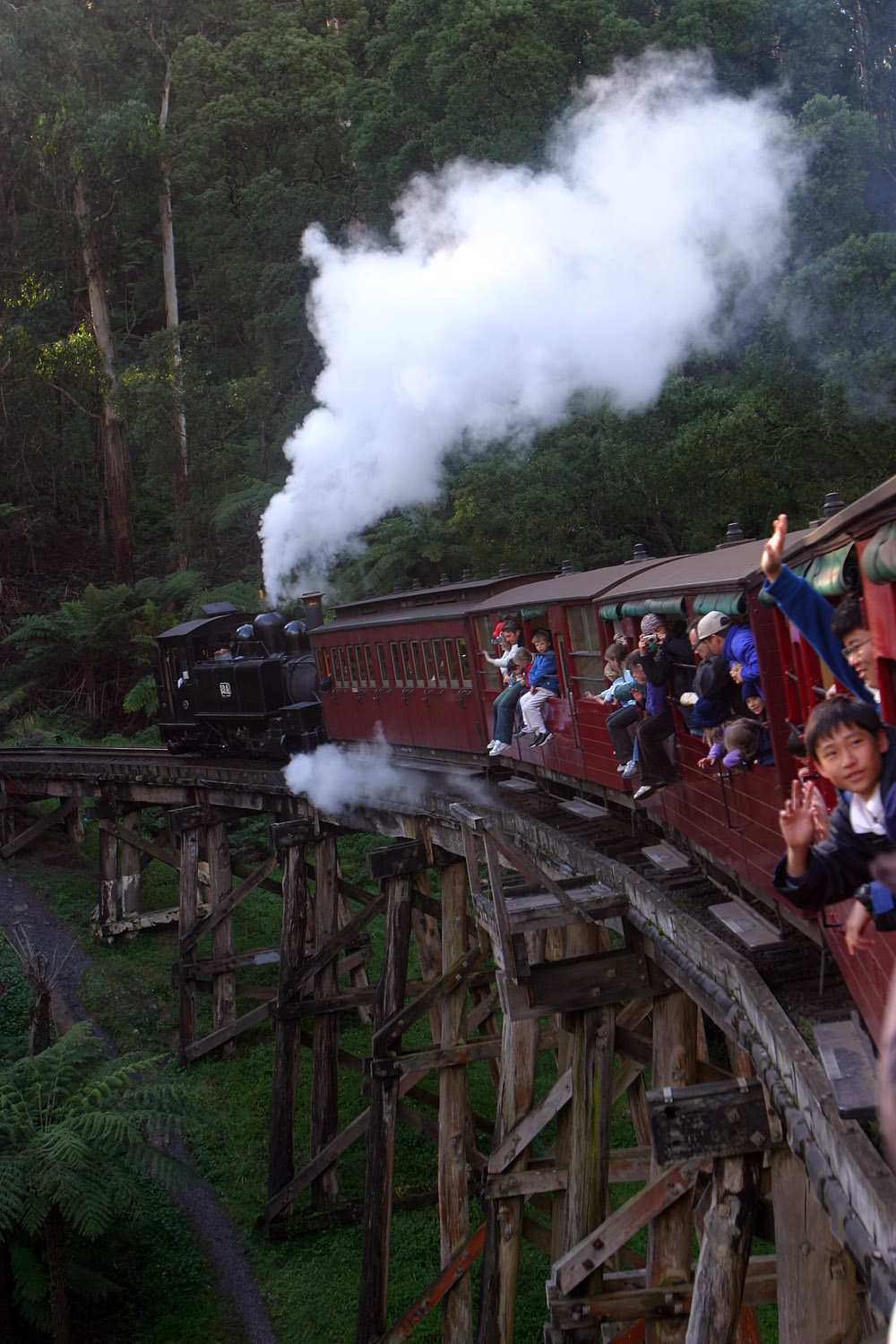
The Monbulk Creek trestle bridge remains a feature of the Gembrook line

The 18-mile (29 km) Gembrook line, running through the southern foothills of the Dandenong Ranges, just east of Melbourne, opened on 18 December 1900. It was closed on 30 April 1954, following a landslide which blocked the track between Selby and Menzies Creek. However, the Puffing Billy Preservation Society was formed in 1955 and, with the co-operation of the Victorian Railways, began to operate tourist services over the remaining usable section of the line between Upper Ferntree Gully and Belgrave stations.

Those services came to an end in 1958 when the line was closed to allow conversion of the track to a broad-gauge electric line, as an extension of the suburban railway system of Melbourne. Through the efforts of the Puffing Billy Preservation Society, the landslide was bypassed, and the remainder of the narrow-gauge line from Belgrave to Gembrook was progressively restored, with trains on the line operating daily for tourists. The railway is now administered by the Emerald Tourist Railway Board.

The Gembrook line always had a much higher passenger loading than the other narrow-gauge lines. The break-of-gauge station of Upper Ferntree Gully was a terminus for Melbourne suburban electric trains, so the line was popular with day-trippers and weekend visitors from Melbourne. Fifteen special excursion carriages, classed NBH, were built to cater for the tourist traffic. Travelling through a region with rich soils and high rainfall, agricultural products such as potatoes formed much of the freight traffic. Over the years, Nobelius Nurseries dispatched thousands of fruit trees from a packing shed located on the company's own siding between Emerald and Nobelius stations. Sawn timber was also an important item of freight, and sidings were located at Gembrook to serve several private 3 ft (914 mm) and 3 ft 6 in (1,067 mm) gauge tramways that brought the timber down from the surrounding hills.

==== List of stations ====
- Upper Ferntree Gully (Junction station with broad gauge.)
- Upwey
- Tecoma
- Belgrave
- Selby
- Menzies Creek
- Clematis
- Emerald
- Nobelius
- Lakeside (Emerald Lake)
- Wright
- Cockatoo
- Fielder
- Gembrook

=== Colac to Beech Forest and Crowes ===
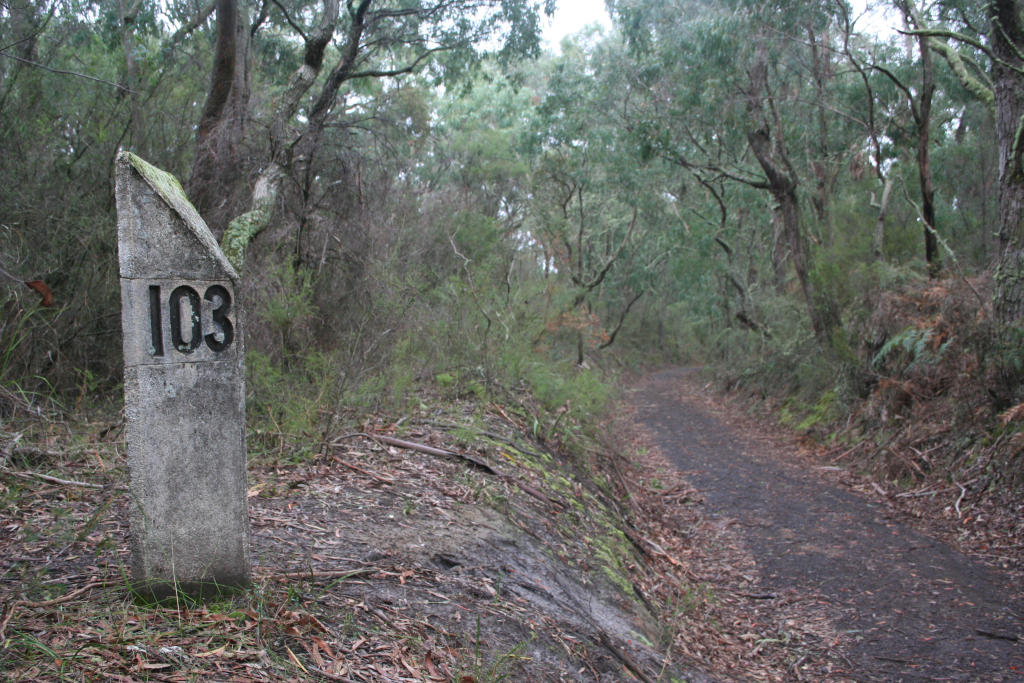
Cutting and 103-mile (166 km) post on the Colac – Beech Forest line

The third line to open was in the Otway Ranges in southwest Victoria. The line from Colac to Beech Forest opened in March 1902, and it was extended to Crowes in June 1911. Nearly 44 miles (70.8 km) long, this was the longest of the narrow-gauge lines. It was also the last to close, finally succumbing in June 1962, although the line had been truncated in 1954.

Both the Colac and Crowes lines entered Beech Forest yard from the same end, creating a junction. Trains had to be turned to run down the Crowes branch and a balloon loop was provided at the other end of the yard. A tennis court occupied the land within the loop. Crowes, the terminus of the line, was the most southerly railway station on the Australian mainland.

The primary traffic was sawn timber and firewood, with many sawmills located adjacent to the railway, or accessed by short tramways. Seasonally heavy potato traffic and a lime kiln added to revenue. Traffic grew to require up to 7 trains a day each way by the mid-1920s. The introduction of the Garratt locomotive allowed a new timetable with two trains each way between Colac and Beech Forest, and a third train each way to Gellibrand. The Crowes branch saw a single mixed train daily. The arrival of the Great Depression and competition from motor vehicles saw traffic decline to a point where only one train each way operated over the line three days a week. Increased wartime loadings saw traffic increase to two trains each way daily, however this improvement was only temporary. By the time the railway closed, the timetable listed only one train each way a week, and most of the traffic was pulpwood.

The line opened using the Staff and Ticket method of safeworking. However Train Section Orders were adopted between 1927 and 1939, after which Staff and Ticket working was resumed.

==== List of stations ====
- Colac (Junction station with broad gauge)
- Eliminyt
- Tulloh
- Coram
- Barongarook
- Birnam
- Kawarren
- Lovat
- Gellibrand
- Banool
- Wimba
- Dinmont
- Ditchley
- Beech Forest (Terminus until 1911)
- Buchanan
- Ferguson
- Weeaproinah (Terminus from 1955)
- Kincaid
- Wyelangta
- Stalker
- Macknott
- Lavers Hill
- Crowes

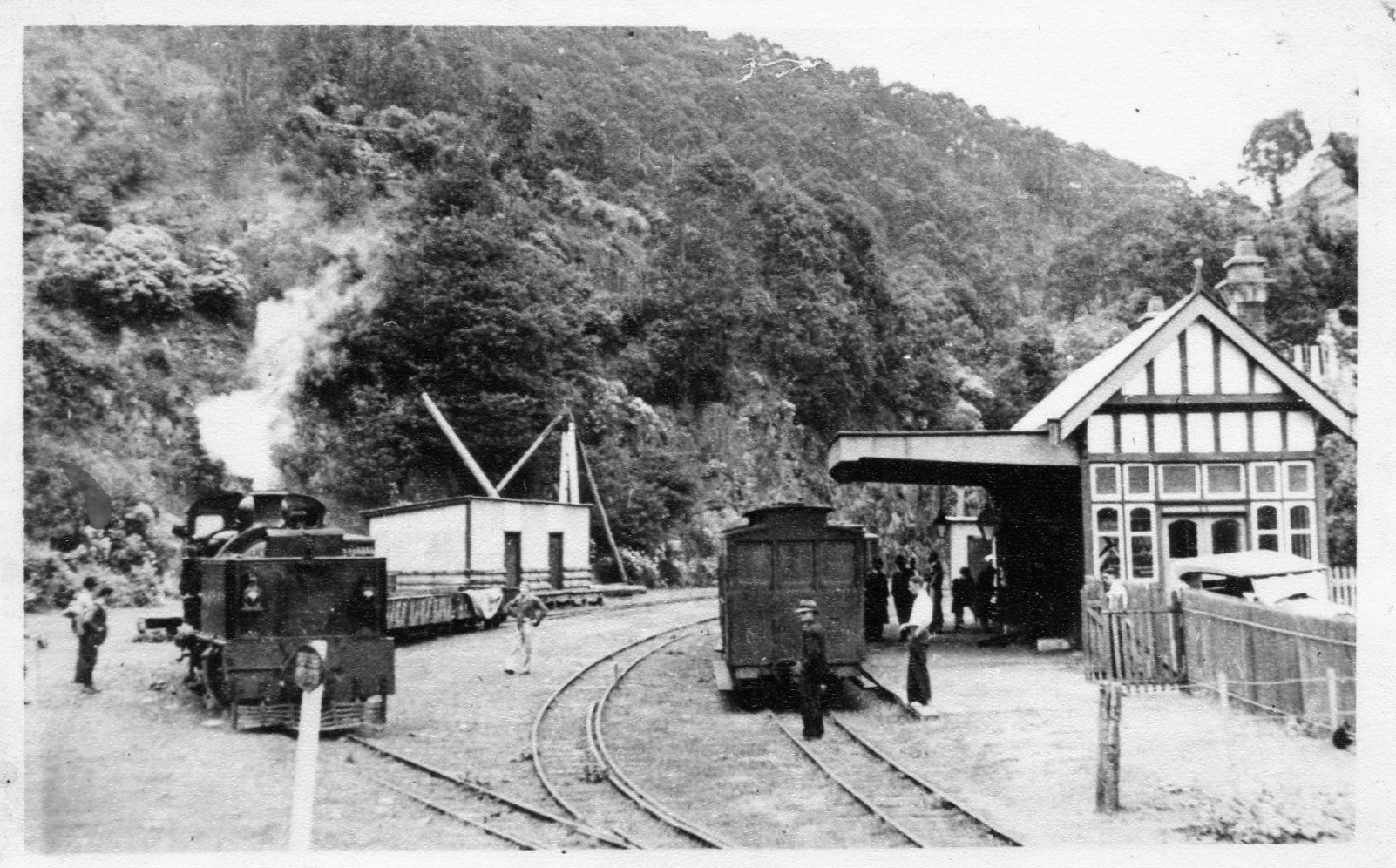
Historic photo of Walhalla railway station ~1926

=== Moe to Walhalla ===
The last of the narrow-gauge lines to open was the 26-mile (41.8 km) line to the gold mining town of Walhalla, in 1910. Walhalla had a history of gold mining dating back to the 1870s, and was one of the largest towns in Gippsland. Local residents had long lobbied for a railway, as all goods had to be brought in by bullock cart over rough terrain. However, the gold mine in Walhalla closed in 1914, and the town quickly fell into steep decline. It was reputed that the major source of traffic from Walhalla were the houses of residents leaving the town.

The line did pick up significant traffic from sawmills in the area, some of which had their own sidings. A connection was made with the Tyers Valley Tramway at Collins siding, between Watson and Erica. While the tramway used the same gauge as the railway, there was no physical connection, timber being transhipped by hand. A temporary connection had to be put in place to move locomotives to and from the tramway. A small copper mine and two lime kilns near Platina provided additional traffic. A series of "Back to Walhalla" days in the 1930s caused the railways to put on special passenger trains for these occasions, and such was the demand some were double-headed.

The line was truncated to Platina in 1944 then to Erica in 1952, before finally closing in 1954. The section of the line from Thomson to Walhalla has been rebuilt and now operates as the Walhalla Goldfields Railway.

==== List of stations ====
- Moe (Junction station with broad gauge.)
- Gooding
- Temporary Station Site
- Tyers River
- Gould
- Moondarra
- Watson
- Erica (Terminus from 1952)
- Murie
- Platina (Terminus from 1944)
- Thomson (Temporary terminus, closed with opening of Walhalla)
- Walhalla

== Welshpool to Port Welshpool horse-drawn tram ==
Unlike the other lines, the 3-mile (4.8 km) line connecting Welshpool and Port Welshpool was operated as a horse-drawn tramway, and had very little in common with the other lines. This line, also known as the Welshpool Jetty line, was opened in 1905 and closed in 1941.
