= Victorian Railways narrow-gauge freight vehicles =

Range of Australian rolling stock

Unlike the broad-gauge, the Victorian Railways' 2 ft 6 in (762 mm) narrow-gauge network never had four-wheeled wagons or trucks in regular service (aside from a handful of trollies). Instead, a single design of 249 underframes was constructed, with identical structure, bogies, couplers and brake equipment. Different bodies were provided on these frames for each purpose. The most common, by far, was the convertible flat/open truck with over 200 examples built (and more in the preservation era), with a total of 31 other trucks built for livestock, louvre vans, insulated and boxcar types.

All the earliest vehicles were issued to service without the "N" prefix to indicate narrow gauge; this was appended later. In an incident report dated 24 December 1898 the narrow gauge open wagons were still being referred to as "QR" rather than ^{N}QR. Codes for each type were equivalent to the broad gauge system, e.g. the open wagons were classed "QR". By 1910 the ^{N} superscript prefix was being added, e.g. ^{N}QR. From 1926 all of the goods stock which had triple-letter classification were simplified to double-letter classification (e.g. ^{N}M^{M} became NM), though some ^{N}QR wagons were not recoded to NQ until much later. However, as late as 1931 occasional references were still made to, for instance, "narrow gauge QR trucks".

In more recent years, the Emerald Tourist Railway Board has started a process of reclassifying all previously double-letter classified goods stock back to the original identities. This is in recognition of the adopted Era of Significance for the Railway, which covers period 1900–1930, during which time they mostly had the double letter coding.

The same frame design was later used for the second generation of ^{N}BH passenger carriages, after the first had been converted from ^{N}QR flat/open trucks.

== Convertible flat/open trucks—^{N}QR ==
Flat and open trucks
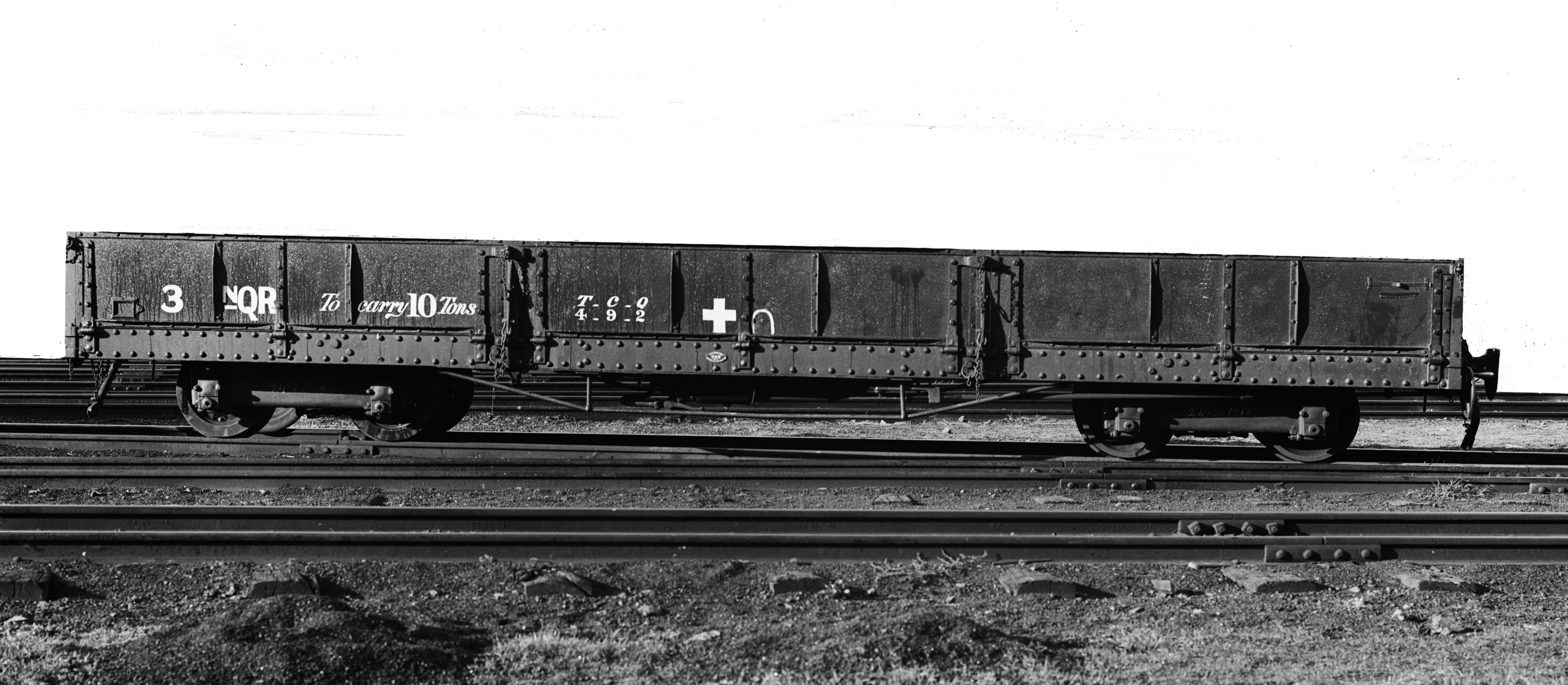
- Narrow gauge open wagon 3^{N}QR
- Manufacturers: Victorian Railways at Newport Workshops, and Puffing Billy Railway at Emerald Carriage Workshops
- Number under construction: 1898–1913, 1997–1998
- Number built: 223
- Number preserved: 25
- Number scrapped: 198
- Design code: ^{N}QR, later NQ
- Fleet numbers: 1-223
- Capacity: 10 long tons (10 t), later increased to 11 long tons (11 t)
- Operators: Victorian Railways, later Puffing Billy Railway

Specifications
- Car body construction: Steel
- Car length: 25 ft 2 in (7.67 m)
- Width: 6 ft 3.25 in (1.9114 m)
- Height: 3 ft 9.75 in (1.1621 m)
- Floor height: 2 ft 0.75 in (0.6287 m)
- Doors: 3 drop each side; thirty fitted with sliding doors in ends and three trap doors in floor
- Wheel diameter: 21 in (530 mm)
- Wheelbase: 20 ft 3 in (6.17 m)
- Maximum speed: 20 mph (32 km/h)
- Weight: 3 long tons 10 cwt (3.6 t), later increased to 4 long tons 14 cwt (4.8 t)
- Bogies: Fox
- Braking system: Westinghouse Air Brake
- Coupling system: Chopper, later 3/4-scale M.C.B. autocouplers
- Track gauge: 2 ft 6 in (762 mm)

The ^{N}QR class of trucks were the staple of the Victorian Railways' narrow gauge fleet. 218 examples were constructed between 1898 and 1914, designed as an open wagon with removable end panels as well as three drop-down but removable doors either side. When assembled into the open wagon format these wagons were designed to have the same capacity (weight and volume) as a normal broad gauge four-wheel open truck, to make load transferring easier at the interchange stations—Colac, Wangaratta, Upper Ferntree Gully and Moe.

The goods truck code had been derived from the conceptually similar broad-gauge QR trucks, which had removable sides to permit various types of loading. Previously, "Q" had been used for bogie flat wagons and "R" for bogie open trucks.

Some of the original trucks were apparently provided with end sliding doors and three trapdoors in the floors, but these elements were not retained in future builds; it is known that thirty wagons in the number series 1-70 inclusive had these features, so it could have been the first thirty delivered for construction of the Whitfield line. The trap doors are shown on diagrams as each being in line with the pillars between the side drop-doors, two on one side of the wagon and the third on the opposite side, parallel with one of the door pillars while the other only had a solid floor.

Letters and numbers were originally painted only on the end bulkheads and doors and the side doors, both of which could be removed as traffic dictated, and this made vehicle identification difficult until these details were transferred to the underframes of each truck. The superscript "N" changed to regular script in the goods vehicle recoding following the auto coupler conversion in 1926.

Some of these trucks were fitted with seats and frameworks supporting shelter to cater for holiday traffic on the Gembrook and Walhalla lines. In particular, NQR trucks 114 and 140 were identified as having screw-type hand brakes fitted in addition to normal air brakes, permitting their use in lieu of brake vans—but only in the Up direction, and only for holiday traffic. Over the years, a number of NQRs were provided with removable wood and steel frameworks with canvas roof canopies and side curtains, and internal seating to supplement the rest of the passenger stock during busy holiday periods. Vehicles known to have been so-fitted include 86NQ and 172NQ. Puffing Billy has re-created these in modified form for emergency capacity. Five more NQRs, numbered 219–223, were built between 1990 and 1992 initially for passenger use so were fitted with the removable frames.

=== Special loads ===
Special arrangements were specified for various forms of irregular timber loading.

==== Sheep ====
Speed Limit 20 Plus notes that six wagons were modified with low level roofs to serve for sheep transport; photos confirm that 79NQ was one of these, but various working time table extracts from 1926 and 1939 identify a group of five wagons - 61, 72, 74, 79 and 80NQ - which were 1 LT (1.0 t) heavier than the rest of the fleet. These frameworks may have been cut-down versions of the holiday traffic canvas roof frameworks provided for high demand holiday passenger traffic.

==== Telegraph poles and piles ====
Telegraph poles and bridge piles of lengths 26 to 30 feet (7.9 to 9.1 m) would be loaded across three NQ wagons, the outer two with an end removed and the middle as a flat wagon only, so the extra timber length would extend in each case towards the middle of the set. In this case the timbers would be supported on a 3 by 2 in (76 by 51 mm) hardwood bolster at the outer bogie and a 9 by 4.5 in (230 by 110 mm) bolster, probably an old sleeper, at the inner bogie, to slant the timber upwards towards the middle. The weight distribution was also important, with a specified maximum weight of half the truck's weight capacity on each.

For longer timber in the range 30 to 35 ft (9.1 to 10.7 m), the instruction was that shorter timbers had to be on the outside and top, with longer timbers closer to the centreline of each wagon. Additionally, the maximum weight was reduced to 9.75 long tons (9.91 t) per truck. If all the timbers were piles 35 ft (11 m) long they had to be placed with the thicker end at the outside of each triple-wagon set, with the load secured to that end. At the inner ends the piles were to be lashed together, but not to either the loaded or safety truck, and the maximum load was reduced to 9.25 long tons (9.40 t) per truck.

For loads 35 to 52 ft (11 to 16 m) a bolster with capacity 4 long tons (4.1 t) was to be constructed on each floor of a coupled set of flat wagons, with the load suspended between them; the position of the bolsters varied with the length of the load. Loads of up to 72 ft (22 m) would be suspended on bolsters on the outer two of a triple-truck set, with loads (excluding the bolsters) per truck of 5 long tons (5.1 t) up to 61 ft (19 m), otherwise the maximum was reduced back down to 4 long tons (4.1 t). For these longest loads the piles had to be loaded in opposing directions, with the large end of one adjacent to the thin end of the other, and no more than two piles per triple-set of trucks could be carried. The width of the load was limited to 34 in (860 mm) at the ends, with the bolsters placed just inside the inner bogies of the outer two trucks. If the load was the maximum length of 78 ft (24 m), the bolsters would be centred on each of the outer two trucks, the maximum load per bolster was still 4 long tons (4.1 t), and the maximum load width was 48 inches (1,200 mm) at each end.

Special instructions were also provided for single, larger logs per truck. Up to two 12 ft (3.7 m) or shorter logs, maximum 5 long tons (5.1 t) each, could be loaded into a single truck. Between 12 and 16 ft (3.7 and 4.9 m) the limit was one log up to 4 long tons (4.1 t), then from 16 to 24 ft (4.9 to 7.3 m) the limit was 10 long tons (10 t). In each case the log/s would be suspended on "Special Chock Bolsters" which had a curve cut out in the centre to keep the logs in the middle of the wagon, and support blocks had to be placed either side of every bogie to support the wagon while it was being loaded.

==== Bags of chaff ====
Other maximum loads were 174 bags of chaff per NQ wagon, in tiers with some transverse and some lengthwise in the wagon with a general trapezoidal shape. The layers, from bottom, were 30, 32, 34, 32, 30 and 16 bags.

==== Firewood ====
Firewood of lengths up to 1 ft (0.30 m) would be loaded to a height of 2 ft 8 in (0.81 m) above the floor of the truck, slightly above the water-level. This was treated as 7 long tons (7.1 t), and secured by arranging some of the load in two layers as a fence around the inside perimeter of the truck to keep the rest of the load in place.

If firewood was in 2 ft (0.61 m) lengths then it was to be loaded in three rows of transverse stacks along the wagon floor with six stays each end of each wagon; if it was only running within the same narrow gauge line it was being loaded on, it could go up to 3 ft (0.91 m) tall (6.75 long tons (6.86 t), but if it was going to be transhipped the maximum height was reduced to 2 ft 8 in (0.81 m) (6 long tons (6.1 t)) to match the capacity of the broad gauge wagons at the interchange stations.

For firewood of lengths 3 to 3.5 ft (0.9 to 1.1 m) long most of the timber was to be loaded transverse along one side of the wagon with two stays at each end, with the balance parallel to the other side with 14 stays along the side, to a height of 3 ft 11 in (1.19 m). This was to be treated as a load of 7.5 long tons (7.6 t) for accounting and train weight purposes. The same principle applied for longer timber, just with fewer stays on the longitudinally-loaded side of the wagon. A full wagon with timber up to 4 ft 6 in (1.37 m) long, at the maximum height 4 ft 8 in (1.42 m), would be charged and treated as 9 long tons (9.1 t), and 5 ft (1.5 m) to 5 ft 2 in (1.57 m) tall would be 10 long tons (10 t).

==== Sawn timber ====
Whitfield line train with timber loaded flat and angled.

Sawn timber loaded into NQ trucks had to be arranged with alternating short and long lengths if possible, to maintain an even weight distribution across the truck's floor. If the timber was too long to make full use of a single truck's weight limit, then some of the timber would be butted up against one end of the truck and the rest would be loaded at an angle in the other end, pointing up towards the middle.

==== Rough-cut timber ====
For timber that was roughly cut, for example fence droppers, pickets, shingles, fodder boards and battens, billets, palings and so on, the timber would be arranged similarly to longer firewood lengths with some transverse and some perpendicular, and a small portion - as little as possible - of the timber would be loaded vertically. This load was considered equivalent to 8.5 long tons (8.6 t), and loaded to 2 feet 10 inches (0.86 m) normally, or 3 feet 6 inches (1.07 m) for "split staves for case making" specifically.

=== ^{N}BH Excursion carriages ===
In April 1919 ^{N}QR wagons 31, 33, 36, 38, 39 and 46 were rebuilt into the first of the ^{N}BH passenger carriages, numbered 1 through 6 respectively and used for second-class passenger holiday traffic by adding seats, a removable roof on poles and tarps for wagon sides and doors.

=== Flat wagons—^{N}Q ===
From 1926 the class was relettered from ^{N}QR to ^{N}Q, reflecting their use more often than not as flat wagons rather than open wagons. Most of the class then remained in service until the early 1950s, when the four VR lines closed and mass scrappings of narrow-gauge stock began. The last NQR was withdrawn in 1958.

On 9 September 1954 six NQ wagons, nos 94, 100, 102, 153, 169 and 208, were sold from Moe station to the Forests Commission. Coincidentally, the quantity of six wagons matches the number taken from Gould station to Moe after the last official train operated on 25 June 1954; the transfer was made by engine 7A and van 7NBC on 29 June 1954.

In 1965 the Victorian Railways transferred a set of two NC vans, three NU wagons and four NQ wagons, one of which (NQ149) was fitted with a water tank, to Upper Ferntree Gully, from which they were handed over to the Preservation Society, in order to assist with the extension and reopening to Emerald station.

Puffing Billy Railway currently has ^{N}QRs 135 and 219–223 inclusive, fitted with seats and a canopy, and ^{N}QR 146 without a canopy. All seven have a capacity of 28 passengers, and a weight of 6 long tons (6.1 t; 6.7 short tons). In goods service are ^{N}QR wagons 21, 29, 91, 186 and 216 with a capacity of 11 long tons (11.2 t; 12.3 short tons) and a tare weight of 5 long tons (5.1 t; 5.6 short tons); and ^{N}QR 21 can be fitted with seats if necessary to match the configuration of ^{N}QR 146.

Additional NQR wagons 220 and 221 entered service on 21 December 1990, built by the Puffing Billy Railway at Emerald Carriage Workshops over the preceding four months, entering service pre-fitted with passenger canopies and seating. They were followed by NQR 222 and 223.

==== NWT ====
Additionally, ^{N}Q 149 is fitted with a water tank that can hold 9,000 litres (2,000 imperial gallons; 2,400 US gallons) of water; this tank was fitted by the Victorian Railways at Newport Workshops in 1965 as an alternate water supply for Emerald station in case the local supply was unavailable during the pre-reopening test trips. It was rated as weighing 6 long tons (6.1 t) when empty, or 14 long tons 18 cwt (15.1 t) when full.

This vehicle has a tare weight of 6 long tons (6.1 t; 6.7 short tons) and a loading capacity of 10 long tons (10.2 t; 11.2 short tons), due to the water tank. As of 2007 the vehicle was listed by VicTrack as being fitted with its water tank and fire-fighting equipment.

==== Current fleet ====
The Railway also possesses untraffickable trucks: ^{N}Q 19 is configured for pulpwood, and open ^{N}QRs 59, 92, 103, 125, 142, 151, 153 and 203. There are also five off-register ^{N}QR wagons, numbers 23, 26, 94, 110 and 169. All of these have a tare weight of 5 long tons (5.1 t; 5.6 short tons) and a loading capacity of 11 long tons (11.2 t; 12.3 short tons).

In the period 2009 to 2017, wagons NQ149 and NQR29 were restored to service.

VicTrack reports on heritage rolling stock in and associated with Victoria, dated 2001 and 2007, both indicate NQ trucks 19 and 142 owned by the Emerald Tourist Railway Board, along with NQR trucks 21, 91, 92, 103, 125, 135, 146, 151, 186, 216, 219-223 inclusive, and NWT149 fitted with fire-fighting equipment; and NQR trucks 29, 94, 164 and 169 privately owned.

Additionally, the latter document notes that NQR87 was owned by "Shires and Councils" as a general category rather than any one specifically, and that plenty of underframe exchanges have happened between rolling stock used on the Puffing Billy Railway. According to that, the underframes of NQR100 and NQR208, privately owned, were used in the construction of 21NBH and 20NBH respectively, and many other vehicles have had their underframes swapped or transplanted at various times.

=== Gallery of NQR variants ===
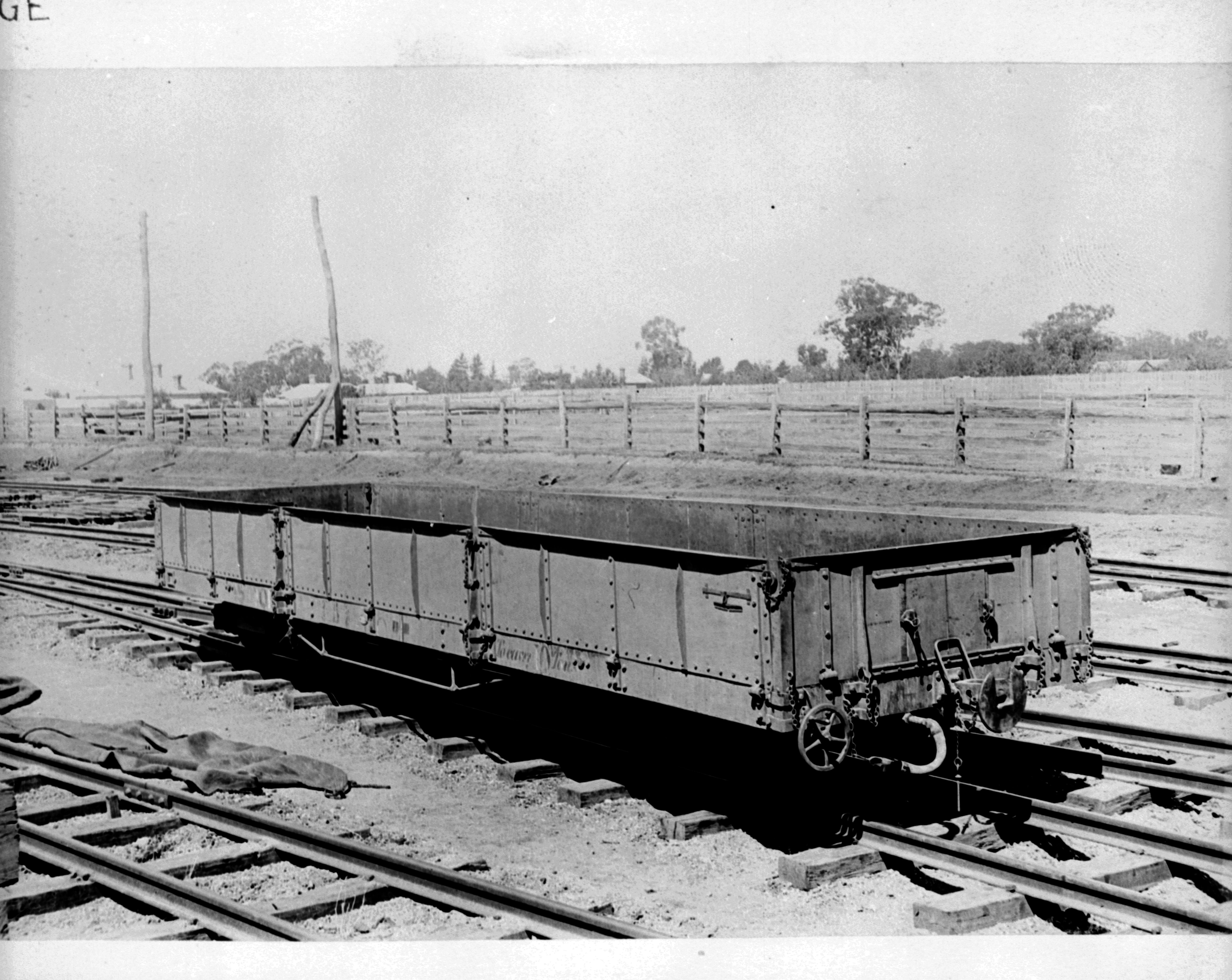
NQR with end doors at Wangaratta

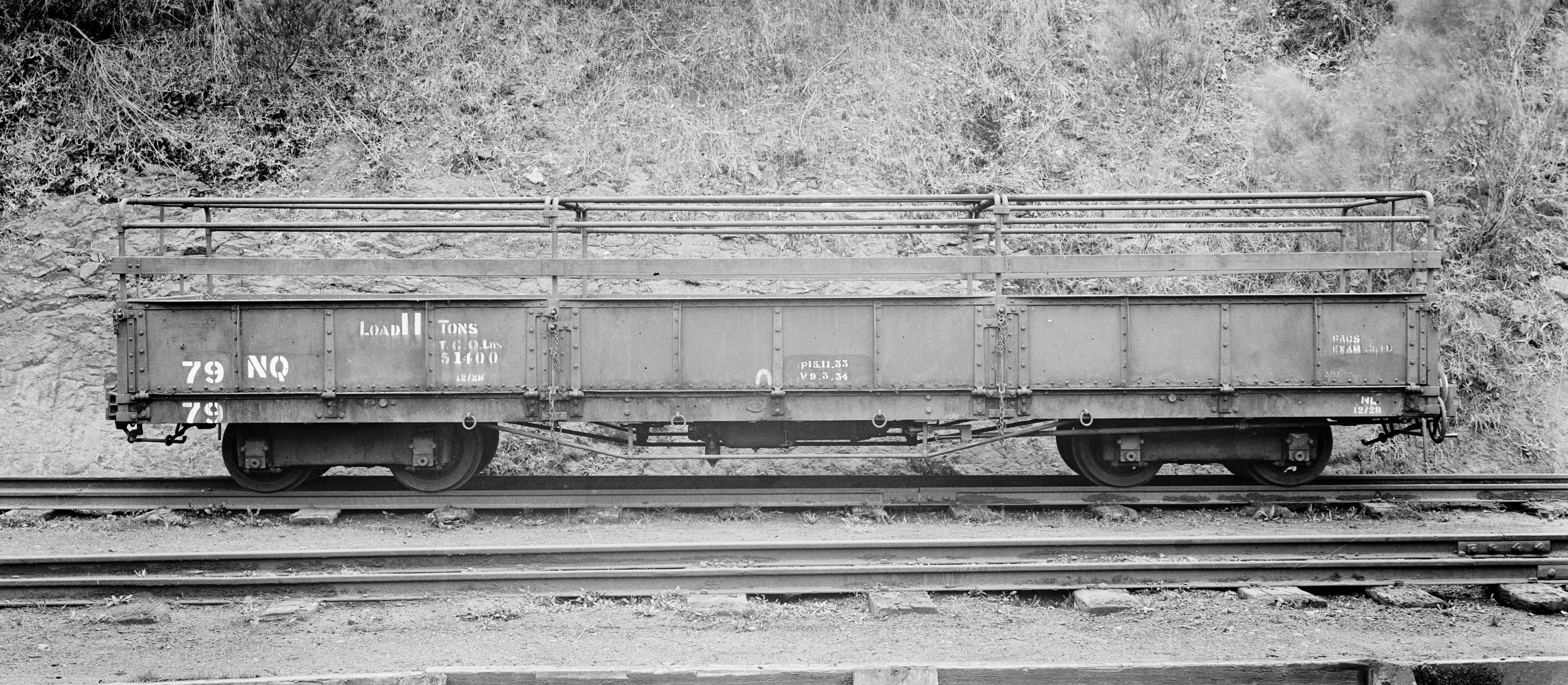
79NQ Upper Ferntree Gully modified for sheep transport - doors closed

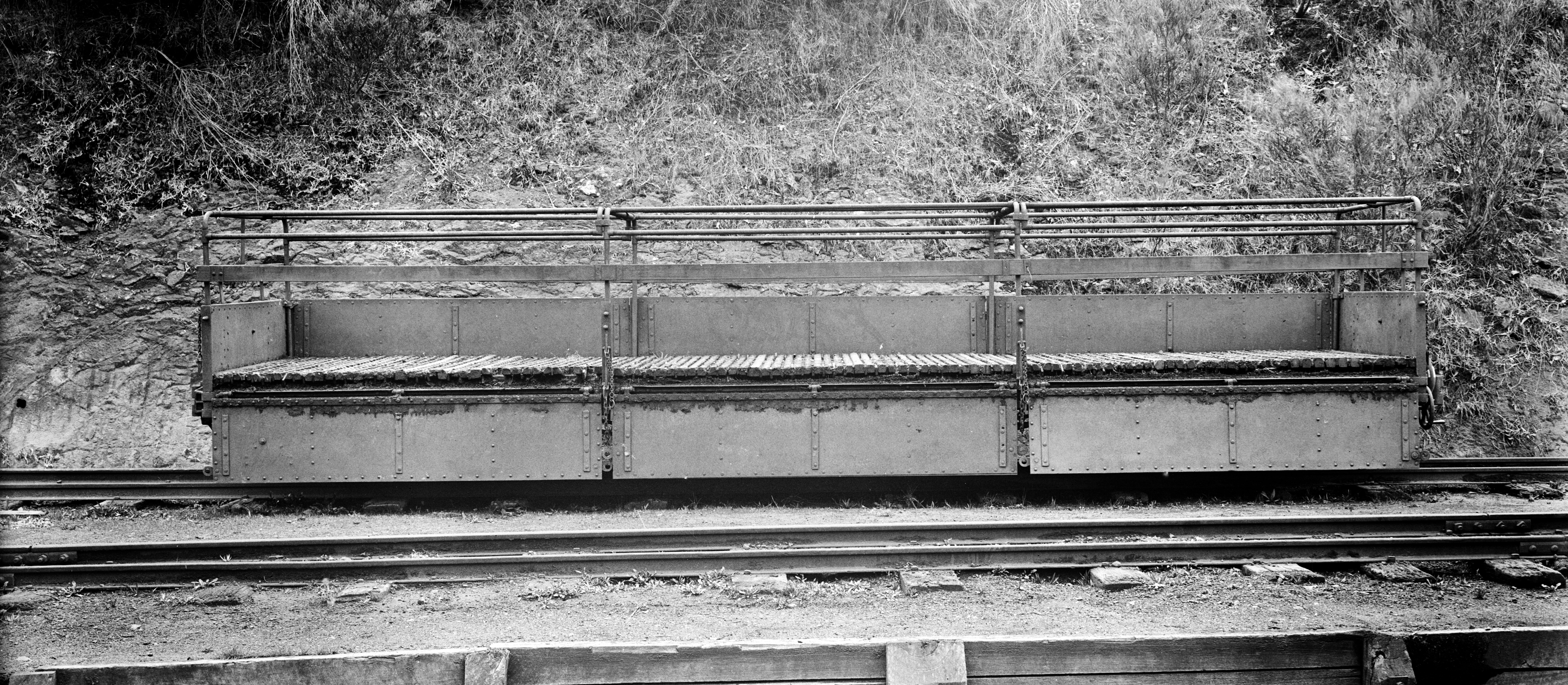
79NQ Upper Ferntree Gully modified for sheep transport - doors open

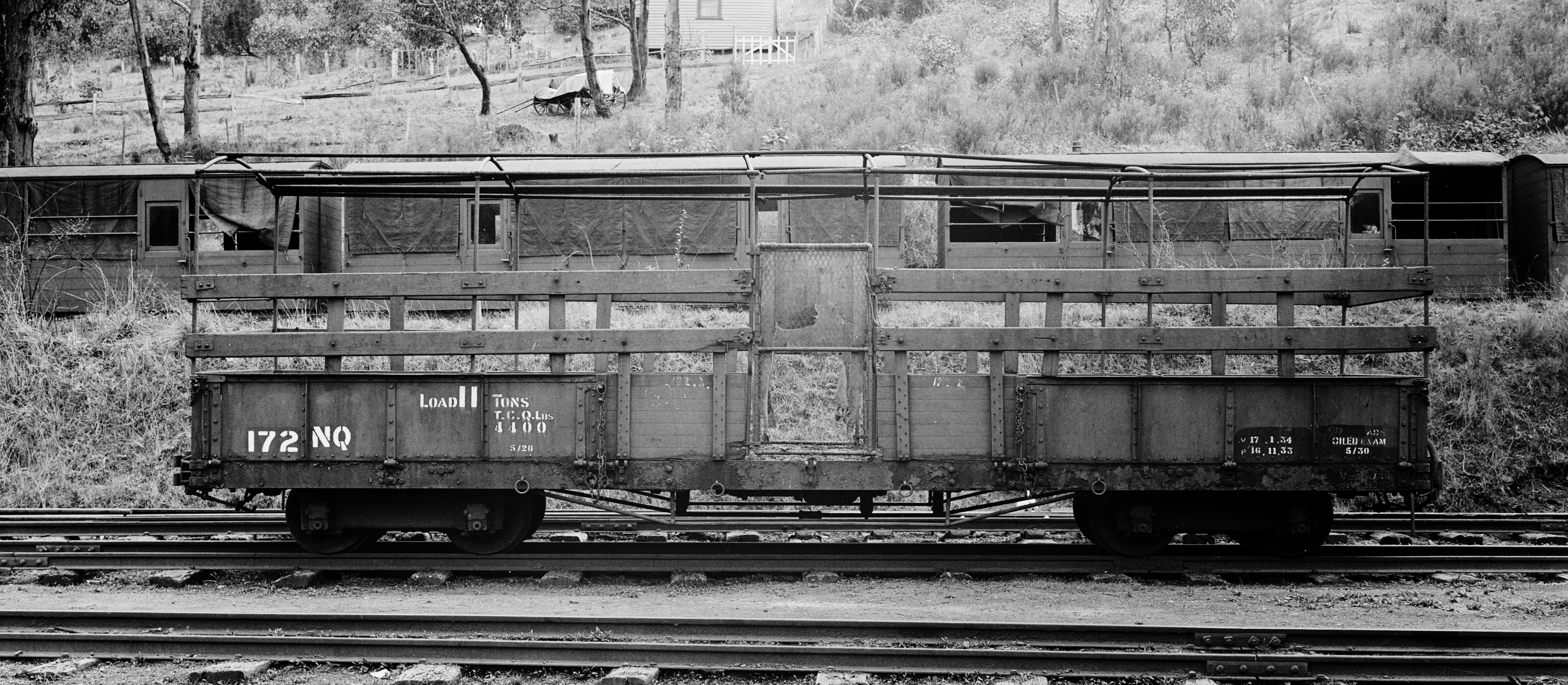
172NQ Upper Ferntree Gully framework for excursion traffic canvas, later used for sheep traffic. 86NQ was similarly modified.

== Cattle trucks—^{N}M^{M}, later NM ==
Cattle trucks
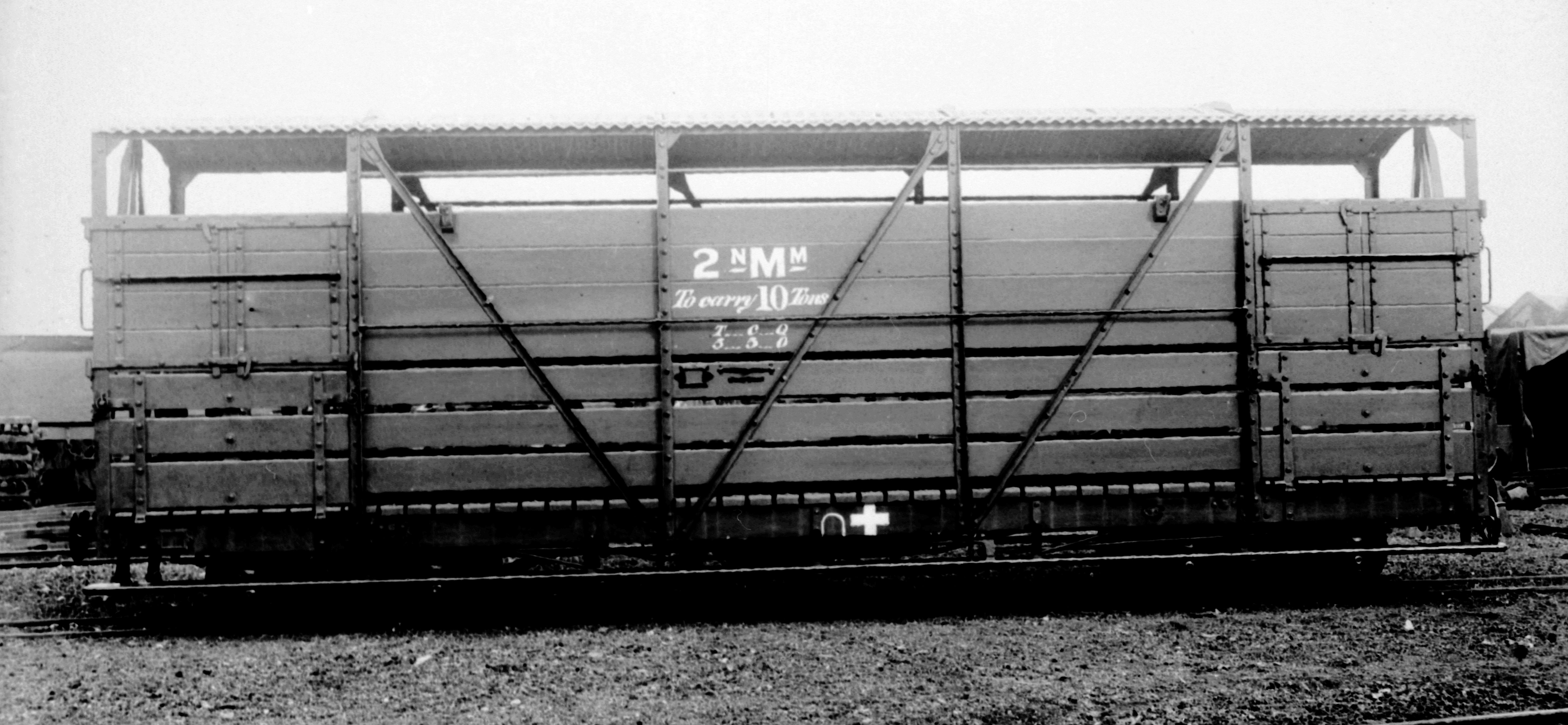
- Cattle wagon 2^{N}M^{M}
- Manufacturer: Victorian Railways at Newport Workshops
- Number under construction: 1899–1918
- Number built: 15
- Number preserved: 2
- Number scrapped: 13
- Design code: ^{N}M^{M}, later NM
- Fleet numbers: 1-15
- Capacity: 10 long tons (10 t), later increased to 11 long tons (11 t)
- Operators: Victorian Railways, later Puffing Billy Railway

Specifications
- Car body construction: Steel framework and wooden sides and ends
- Car length: 25 ft (7.6 m)
- Width: 6 ft (1.8 m)
- Height: 9 ft 7.25 in (2.9274 m)
- Floor height: 2 ft 0.75 in (0.6287 m)
- Doors: One combined drop and double-swing door in each corner
- Wheel diameter: 21 in (530 mm)
- Wheelbase: 20 ft 3 in (6.17 m)
- Maximum speed: 20 mph (32 km/h)
- Weight: 6 long tons 4.75 cwt (6.338 t), later increased to 8 long tons 2 cwt (8.2 t)
- Bogies: Fox
- Braking system: Westinghouse Air Brake
- Coupling system: Chopper, later 3/4-scale M.C.B. autocouplers
- Track gauge: 2 ft 6 in (762 mm)

This class consisted of 15 vehicles. Construction started in 1899, but the first ^{N}MM did not enter service until 1903. After this the rest of the class followed slowly, with the last of the class not entering service until 1917. They looked similar to the MM cattle trucks, despite being built 25 years earlier. The trucks ere fitted with four doors in the corners, each of which comprised a lower half that dropped down to form a ramp and an upper half made of two outward-swinging panels. The curved roof was corrugated iron. Full-length footboards were originally fitted on each side, but these and some handrails were later removed. Additionally, most of the fleet had an internal partition fitted later, to split the wagon capacity into two equal compartments.

As part of the late 1920s recoding, the class was altered to NM. Around the same time, all but the class leader had autocouplers fitted (1 NM was not converted until 1941).

In the mid-1920s there was a derailment on the Moe–Walhalla line. In the consist were NM vehicles. It was determined that the derailment was caused by "spooked" horses in an NM vehicle. The vehicle was coupled next to an NA tank engine which was running bunker first. The smoke from the funnel apparently was the reason for the distress. After this investigation, the ends of all the NM class were progressively boarded up.

As the narrow-gauge lines were closed, the trucks were sold off. Most were scrapped; 13 ^{N}MM is used by Puffing Billy on wood trains, and 6 NM was recently rescued from a farm and is currently in storage awaiting restoration.

== Louvre trucks—^{N}U^{U}, later NU ==
Louvre trucks
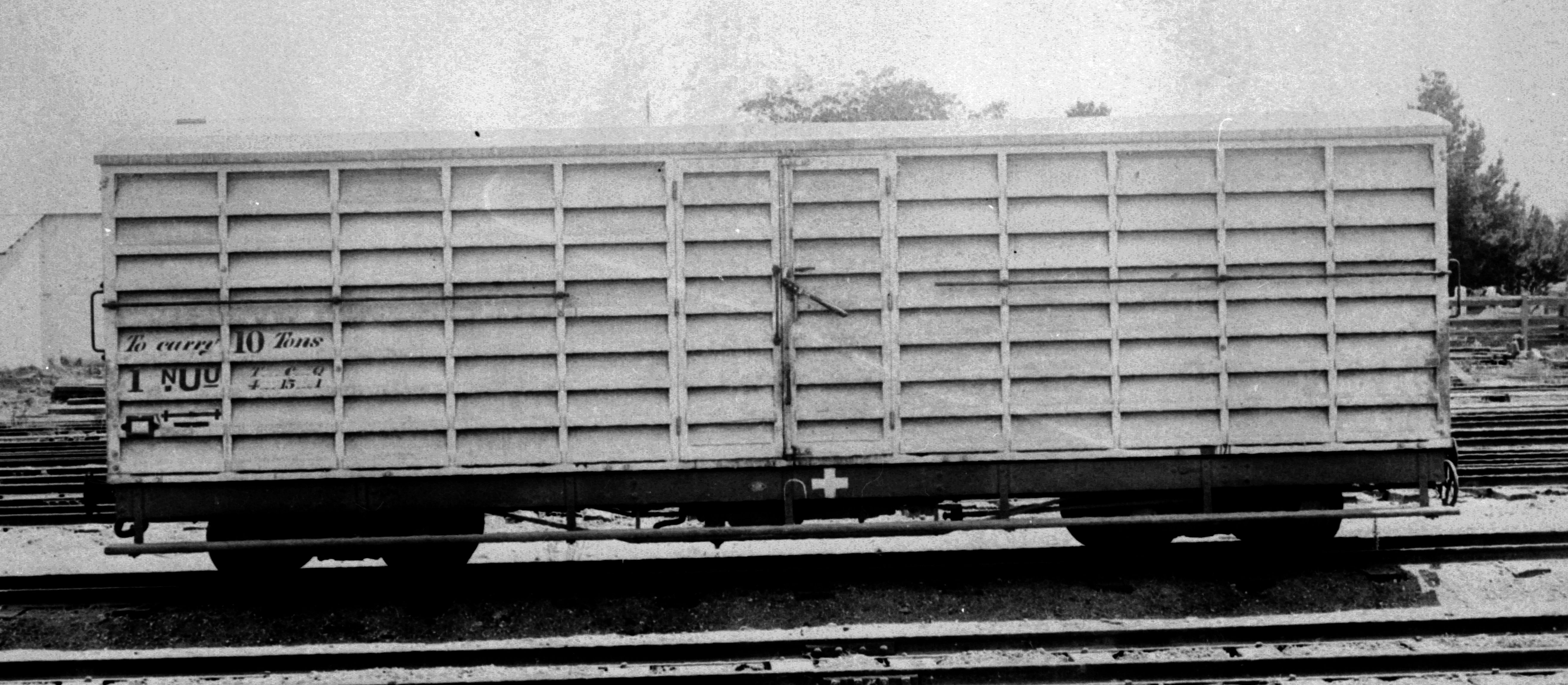
- Louvre van 1^{N}U^{U}
- Manufacturer: Victorian Railways at Newport Workshops
- Number under construction: 1899–1911
- Number built: 14
- Number preserved: 6
- Number scrapped: 8
- Design code: ^{N}U^{U}, later NU
- Fleet numbers: 1-14
- Capacity: 10 long tons (10 t), later increased to 11 long tons (11 t). 841.68 ft^{3} (23.834 m^{3})
- Operators: Victorian Railways, later Puffing Billy Railway

Specifications
- Car body construction: Wood
- Car length: 25 ft 2 in (7.67 m)
- Width: 6 ft (1.8 m)
- Height: 9 ft 7.25 in (2.9274 m)
- Floor height: 2 ft 0.75 in (0.6287 m)
- Doors: Double-leaf wood louvre doors, each side of centre
- Wheel diameter: 21 in (530 mm)
- Wheelbase: 20 ft 3 in (6.17 m)
- Maximum speed: 20 mph (32 km/h)
- Weight: 4 long tons 15.25 cwt (4.839 t), later increased to 7 long tons 2.75 cwt (7.252 t)
- Bogies: Fox
- Braking system: Westinghouse Air Brake
- Coupling system: Chopper, later 3/4-scale M.C.B. autocouplers
- Track gauge: 2 ft 6 in (762 mm)

The standard louvred truck design for the Victorian narrow-gauge lines, the ^{N}UU vehicles, were constructed in three batches; the first seven from 1899 to 1901, an eighth in 1906 and the last six in 1911, for a total class of fourteen. They looked very similar to the U trucks of the broad-gauge. These trucks were painted white until approximately 1910, as shown in two photographs of NUU 1. Given construction dates, it is likely that van 8^{N}U^{U} entered service painted brown, and the same is probable for vans 9-14.

Later in service life the full-length footboards were removed and replaced with shorter versions just at the central door opening.

=== NU ===
In 1926 the class was relettered to simply NU, with no changes to numbers.

NU 4 was scrapped in 1938, but otherwise the class remained intact until the Whitfield line closed at the end of 1953, when a number were sold off. Speed Limit 20 Plus lists 2, 7, 8, 11 and 12NU, while Vincent shows three separate sale contracts, first for 8NU on 21 December 1953, then 2, 5, 7, 11 and 12NU on 18 January 1954, and 9NU also in January 1954 but undated. Speed Limit 20 Plus further notes that 8NU and 11NU were sold to the Shire of Oxley as storage units in the council depot at Moyhu; 11NU was subsequently shifted to Wangaratta, and was destroyed by fire in 1978. 2NU was sold to the Whitfield General Store, and has since been preserved at Erica on the former Walhalla line. 8NU was donated to the predecessor of the Walhalla Goldfields Railway, though it has since been forward to Puffing Billy. Speed Limit 20 Plus records 7NU and 11NU, circa 2017, being stored at Moyhu pending preservation; the latter is most likely 12NU, as Vincent notes 7NU and 12NU stored at Moyhu pending preservation in January 1994.

Nos. 6 and 1 were scrapped in 1957 and 1958 respectively, while in 1954 van 13, isolated at Cockatoo, was recorded as being sold to the Puffing Billy Preservation Society. In 1977, the remaining vans 3, 10 and 14 were handed over to the Emerald Tourist Railway Board, and removed from Victorian Railways records. The Puffing Billy Railway now possesses vans 3, 8, 10, 13 and 14.

=== NW ===
Between 1972 and 1977, 10 NU was lettered as 10 NW, indicating its use as a workmen's sleeper.

== Covered truck with explosives accommodation—^{N}PH, later NH ==
Covered truck with explosives accommodation
- Manufacturer: Victorian Railways at Newport Workshops
- Number under construction: 1910
- Number built: 1
- Number preserved: 1
- Design code: ^{N}PH, later NH
- Fleet numbers: 1
- Capacity: 10 long tons (10 t), later increased to 11 long tons (11 t). Short compartment 354 ft^{3} (10.0 m^{3}), long compartment 449 ft^{3} (12.7 m^{3})
- Operator: Victorian Railways

Specifications
- Car body construction: Wood
- Car length: 25 ft 2 in (7.67 m)
- Width: 6 ft 3 in (1.91 m)
- Height: 8 ft 8.25 in (2.6480 m)
- Floor height: 2 ft 0.75 in (0.6287 m)
- Doors: Pairs of double doors either side of each compartment
- Wheel diameter: 21 in (530 mm)
- Wheelbase: 20 ft 3 in (6.17 m)
- Maximum speed: 20 mph (32 km/h)
- Weight: 6 long tons 7 cwt (6.5 t), later increased to 7 long tons 15 cwt (7.9 t)
- Bogies: Fox
- Braking system: Westinghouse Air Brake
- Coupling system: Chopper, later 3/4-scale M.C.B. autocouplers
- Track gauge: 2 ft 6 in (762 mm)

In June 1910, it was decided that a truck for the transportation of explosives would be useful for the Moe-Walhalla line, which served a gold-mining town; the rail line had been built from Moe to provide a faster means of transportation than bullock teams from the sailing boats from Melbourne to Port Albert/Sale via Heyfield.

NPH 1 was built on the standard design of underframe as most other narrow-gauge stock, but because it was not anticipated that explosives traffic would require use of the entire wagon, it was partitioned to give 4 long tons (4.1 t; 4.5 short tons) capacity for explosives, while the remaining 6 tons was for general goods. Unlike the NU and NT classes, this meant that the van had four double doors total. Internally the van was 5 ft 7.5 in (1.715 m) at the sides, while the curved roof gave an internal height at the centre of 6 ft 0.5 in (1.842 m).

However, in late March 1911 the wagon had been converted to entirely general goods use, with the partition removed and a recoding to NH 1, the "H" in the class being a reference to the broad-gauge H covered trucks then in use. The vehicle was allowed to carry 10 tons of general goods. At the time of the modification its eight iron-plate doors (four sets of double, outwards-swinging doors) were replaced with louvred doors similar to those of the ^{N}U^{U} vans.

It gained autocouplers in 1928. After the Whitfield line was closed in late 1953 it was sold, along with a number of NU Louvre vans, to the scrap dealer Coulston & Hyder. The van was then onsold to the Shire of Oxley as a storage unit in the council depot at Moyhu. 1NH was donated to the Puffing Billy Railway in 1968 and placed in the Menzies Creek museum. As of 2009 the van was recorded as on the Puffing Billy Railway's rolling stock register, but in an untrafficable condition.

== Insulated truck—^{N}T^{T}, later NT ==
Insulated truck
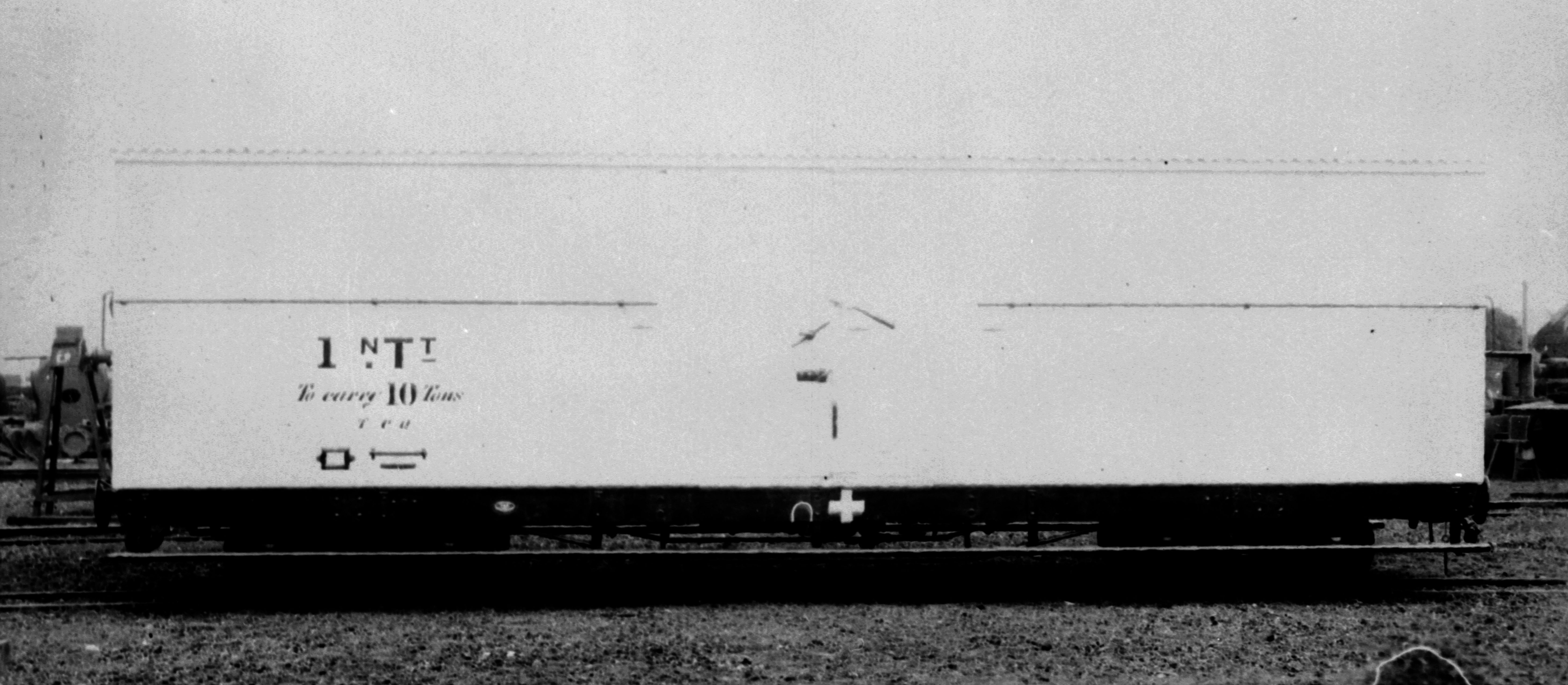
- Narrow gauge van 1^{N}T^{T} at Newport Workshops
- Manufacturer: Victorian Railways at Newport Workshops
- Number under construction: 1899
- Number built: 1
- Number preserved: 1
- Design code: ^{N}T^{T}, later NT
- Fleet numbers: 1
- Capacity: 10 long tons (10 t), later increased to 11 long tons (11 t). 750.76 ft^{3} (21.259 m^{3})
- Operator: Victorian Railways

Specifications
- Car body construction: Wood, vertically planked inside and outside, insulated with cow hair.
- Car length: 25 ft 2 in (7.67 m)
- Width: 6 ft 3 in (1.91 m)
- Height: 8 ft 8.25 in (2.6480 m)
- Floor height: 2 ft 0.75 in (0.6287 m)
- Doors: Double doors either side
- Wheel diameter: 21 in (530 mm)
- Wheelbase: 20 ft 3 in (6.17 m)
- Maximum speed: 20 mph (32 km/h)
- Weight: 5 long tons 19.75 cwt (6.084 t), later increased to 7 long tons 7.75 cwt (7.506 t)
- Bogies: Fox
- Braking system: Westinghouse Air Brake
- Coupling system: Chopper, later 3/4-scale M.C.B. autocouplers
- Track gauge: 2 ft 6 in (762 mm)

In October 1899 a single insulated truck, ^{N}T^{T} 1, was built for the transportation of goods that needed to be kept cold, such as raw meat and dairy products. Like the ^{N}U^{U} trucks, it was painted white from new, being repainted the standard venetian red of goods stock from about 1910. Its walls were 5 1/4 inches (130 mm) thick, reducing the interior space, and insulated with cow hair. Internally the van was 5 feet 7 inches (1.70 m) at the sides, and 5 feet 11 inches (1.80 m) at the centreline.

The truck was originally intended for the Whitfield line, but instead entered service on the Gembrook line in 1903. The truck was relettered to simply NT in 1926. It later made its way to the Crowes line, before finally being transferred to Whitfield in 1948. It was photographed abandoned at Whitfield railway station, abandoned with an NU van after that line closed, though it must have been there since the bushfires in February 1952 when locomotive-hauled services ceased beyond Moyhu. At some point the full-length footboards were replaced with shorter units the same as fitted to the NU louvre vans.

It was retained on the rolling stock register through 1958, but its whereabouts were unknown until a decade later when it was discovered in a scrap metal yard in Maribyrnong; it was then donated to the Puffing Billy Railway, and found its way to the Menzies Creek museum. In September 2008 it was removed from the museum and shunted via Belgrave to Emerald for restoration, as a static storage facility at Belgrave associated with the Luncheon and Night trains.

Today, 1NT is used at Belgrave station for storage.

== Workshop Transfer wagon Q129 ==
Q129 is a 5 ft 3 in (1,600 mm) broad gauge skeletal flat wagon built in June 1926, initially to transfer the Garratt locomotives' engine units (Note: The Garratt boiler unit was transferred separately, loaded by cranes in a QB well wagon.) from Newport to Colac and Moe, and later used for the NA class engines as well. It is now preserved at the Menzies Creek Steam Museum adjacent to Menzies Creek railway station on the Puffing Billy Railway.

== Preservation era ==
Under the Emerald Tourist Railway Board, a range of rolling stock from other systems in Australia have been acquired and regauged for use on the Puffing Billy Railway to cater for the increased demand.

The primary example of goods vehicle is the acquisition from the Tasmanian Government Railways of a number of ballast hopper trucks. QG3 was the first to be converted for narrow gauge use, with an "N" prefix added when it entered service in 1972. In 2003 the truck's identity was altered to be consistent with Victorian Railways goods coding practise, with the new code of ^{N}N^{N}1 representing the pre-1926 style. The N prefix is for "narrow" gauge, and the suffix indicating that it is a bogie wagon much like NUU, NTT, etc. above. However, unlike those examples, it is likely that the Victorian Railways would have retained the "NNN" code instead of simplifying to "NN", because there was already a broad-gauge ballast vehicle of that classification.

A second ex-TGR QG wagon has since entered service on Puffing Billy as ^{N}N^{N}2, formerly Tasmanian Railways ballast hopper QG18.
