= McDevitt railway station =

Former railway station in Victoria, Australia

McDevitt

General information
- Line: Crowes
- Platforms: 1
- Tracks: 1

Other information
- Status: Closed

History
- Opened: 1904
- Closed: 1961

McDevitt was a railway station and later stopping place near Colac, Victoria, Australia. It was located on the now dismantled Victorian Railways narrow gauge Crowes railway line. The first McDevitt station opened in 1904 and was 24 mile 55 chains (39.75 km) from Colac. The original station closed in 1930 and was replaced by a simple passenger shelter 6 chains (120 m) closer to Beech Forest. It closed with the closure of the Colac to Beech Forest section of the line in 1962.

There are no remains today. A portion of the railway reservation is now part of the Old Beechy Rail Trail.

== External sources ==
- Government railways in Australia of less than 1067 mm gauge
