= Gellibrand railway station =

Former railway station in Victoria, Australia

Gellibrand

General information
- Coordinates: 38°31′19″S 143°32′21″E
- Line: Crowes
- Platforms: 1
- Tracks: 4

Other information
- Status: Closed

History
- Opened: 1902
- Closed: 1962
Location

Gellibrand was a railway station on the now-dismantled Victorian Railways narrow gauge Crowes railway line, 17 miles 20 chains (27.75 km) from Colac, Victoria. It had a single low-level platform with three tracks. A fourth one was added in 1923. The station closed in 1962, along with the Colac to Beech Forest section of the line.

The station yard and a portion of the railway reservation is now part of the Old Beechy Rail Trail. The original station building survives, which is used to display historical information.

== External sources ==
- Government railways in Australia of less than 1067 mm gauge
