= Temporary station site railway station =

Former railway station in Victoria, Australia

Coordinates: 38°4′42″S 146°20′5″E

Temporary Station Site

General information
- Line: Walhalla
- Platforms: 1
- Tracks: 1

Other information
- Status: Closed

History
- Opened: 1905
- Closed: 1906

Services
Preceding station	Disused railways	Following station
Gooding	Walhalla line	Siding
	List of closed railway stations in Victoria	
Location

Temporary Station Site was a railway station on the Walhalla narrow gauge line in Gippsland, Victoria, Australia. The station was never officially opened or named, it was used during the construction of the railway. It consisted of the main line and two loop lines, with a possible dead-end siding for ballast loading.
