= Gould railway station =

Former railway station in Victoria, Australia

Coordinates: 38°4′8″S 146°21′31″E

Gould

General information
- Operator: Victorian Railways
- Line: Walhalla
- Platforms: 1
- Tracks: 2

Other information
- Status: Closed

History
- Opened: 3 May 1910
- Closed: 26 June 1954

Services
See Walhalla later Erica line Timetable
Preceding station	Disused railways	Following station
Tyers River	Walhalla line	Moondarra
	List of closed railway stations in Victoria	
Location

Gould was a railway station on the Walhalla narrow gauge line in Gippsland, Victoria, Australia. The station was opened in 1910 and consisted of a station platform and a 2 goods sidings.A water tower was located here.
