= Banool railway station =

Former railway station in Victoria, Australia

Coordinates: 38°38′39″S 143°33′07″E

Banool

General information
- Line: Crowes
- Platforms: 1
- Tracks: 3

Other information
- Status: Closed

History
- Opened: 1902
- Closed: 1962
- Former names: Moorbanool
Location

Banool was a stopping place and railway station located on the now dismantled Victorian Railways narrow gauge Crowes railway line. It opened in 1902 as Moorbanool and was renamed Banool in November 1904. Originally built with 3 tracks, one was removed in 1923. It closed with the closure of the Colac to Beech Forest section of the line in 1962.

Today all that remains is the original Railway Station signage. A portion of the original railway reservation is now part of the Old Beechy Rail Trail.

== External sources ==
- Government railways in Australia of less than 1067 mm gauge
- Railpage Australia - Discussion on riding the Old Beechy Rail Trail
