= Tyers River railway station =

Former railway station in Victoria, Australia

Tyers River

General information
- Line: Walhalla
- Platforms: 1
- Tracks: 1

Other information
- Status: Closed

History
- Opened: 3 May 1910
- Closed: 1916

Services
| Preceding station | Disused railways | Following station |
|---|---|---|
| Siding | Walhalla line | Gould |
| | List of closed railway stations in Victoria | |

Tyers River was a railway station on the Walhalla narrow gauge line in Gippsland, Victoria, Australia. The station was located just 885m from Gould Station.

In 1916, the station was closed due to lack of patronage.
