= Dinmont railway station =

Former railway station in Victoria, Australia

Dinmont

General information
- Coordinates: 38.61225°S 143.5645°E
- Line: Crowes
- Platforms: 1
- Tracks: 2

Other information
- Status: Closed

History
- Opened: 1902
- Closed: 1961
- Former names: Weeaproinah
Location

Dinmont was a stopping place and railway station in Victoria, Australia. It was located on the now dismantled Victorian Railways narrow gauge Crowes railway line. It opened in 1902 as Weeaproinah and was renamed in 1912 with the opening of Weeaproinah on the Beech Forest – Crowes section of the line. It closed with the closure of the Colac to Beech Forest section of the line in 1962.

Today all that remains is the original water tank. A portion of the railway reservation is now part of the Old Beechy Rail Trail.

== External sources ==
- Government railways in Australia of less than 1067 mm gauge
