= Gooding railway station =

Former railway station in Victoria, Australia

Coordinates: 38°08′08″S 146°16′17″E

Gooding

General information
- Line: Walhalla
- Platforms: 1
- Tracks: 1

Other information
- Status: Closed

History
- Opened: 3 May 1910
- Closed: 26 June 1954

Services
Preceding station	Disused railways	Following station
Moe	Walhalla line	Temporary Station Site
	List of closed railway stations in Victoria	
Location

Gooding was a railway station on the Walhalla narrow gauge line in Gippsland, Victoria, Australia. The station was opened in 1910 and was the lowest altitude station on the line. The station consisted of a platform area and a name board.

The station was named after the Gooding family, who owned a farm in the area. Prior to 1910, the Goodings' farm had been a stopping place for coaches traveling towards Walhalla, this coach traffic ceasing after the railway opened. With the construction of the railway, the Railways Commission of Victoria allotted the area a siding at a point where the line crossed the Walhalla Road, which was named Gooding Station. Passengers who wished to board the train could do so by signalling the train driver to stop and take them aboard. Similarly, passengers wishing to disembark could also do so by arrangement with the train's crew.
