= Moondarra railway station =

Former railway station in Victoria, Australia

Coordinates: 38°1′24″S 146°21′33″E

Moondarra

General information
- Line: Walhalla
- Platforms: 1
- Tracks: 2

Other information
- Status: Closed

History
- Opened: 3 May 1910
- Closed: 26 June 1954

Services
Preceding station	Disused railways	Following station
Gould	Walhalla line	Watson
	List of closed railway stations in Victoria	
Location

Moondarra (originally named Pearson) was a railway station on the Walhalla narrow gauge line in Gippsland, Victoria, Australia. The station was opened in 1910, consisting of a "waiting shed" and a goods siding. For a time a tramway also operated from the station, which opened in March 1937 and closed during the 1940s.
