= Crowes railway station =

Former railway terminus in Australia

Crowes
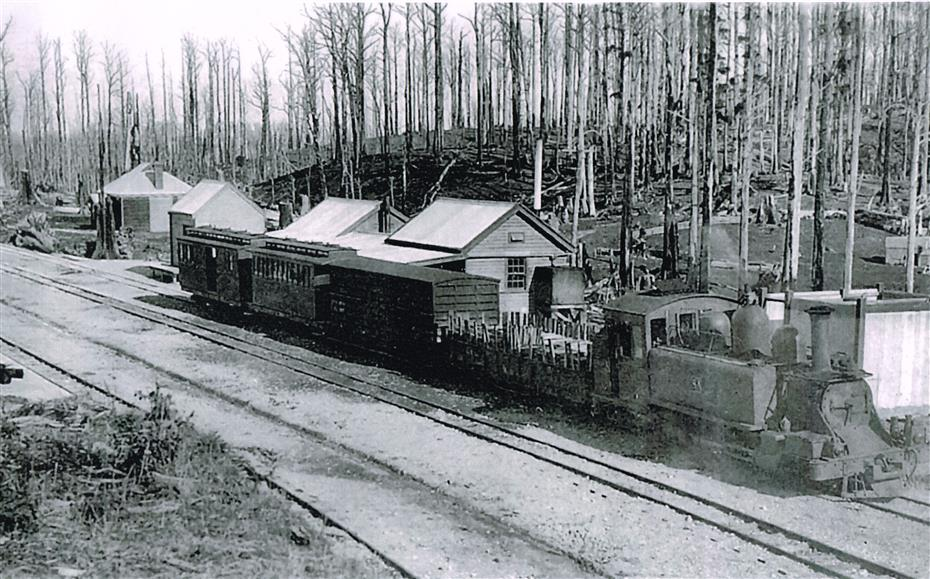
- Crowes Station in 1912, soon after opening

General information
- Line: Crowes
- Platforms: 1
- Tracks: 3

Other information
- Status: Closed

History
- Opened: 1910
- Closed: 1954

Crowes was a railway station located in the Otway Ranges. It is noted for having been the southernmost railway terminus in mainland Australia.

== History ==
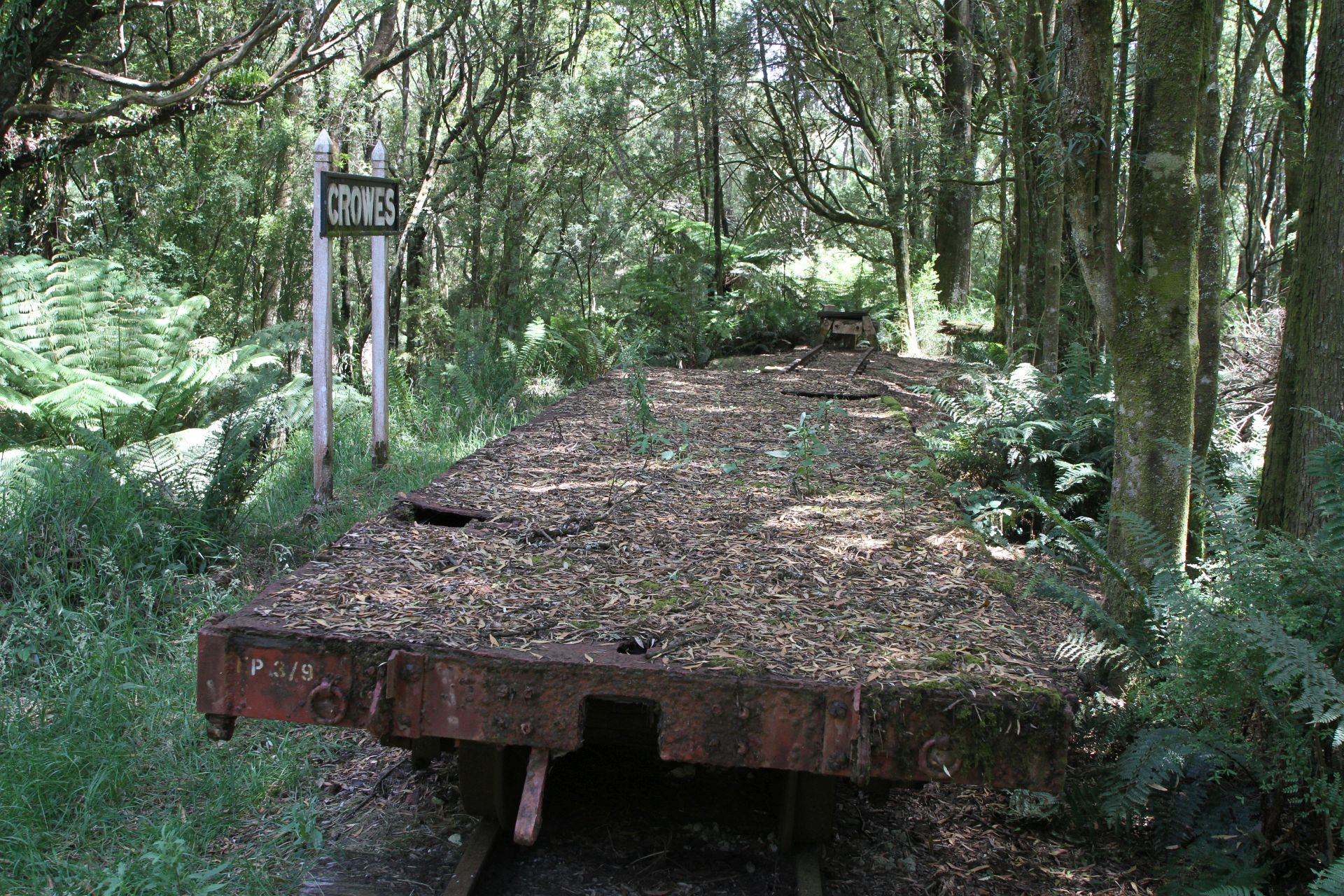
Preserved wagon and buffer stop mark the site today

Crowes station was opened on 20 June 1911, as part of the extension of the Colac to Beech Forest Narrow-gauge railway.

It consisted of a platform track and two loop sidings, with No. 3 Road servicing a pig race and a ramped goods platform. A four-chain curve beyond the yard ended with a standard narrow-gauge buffer stop in front of a huge tree stump.

At the up end of the yard, an Annett-locked loco siding facing the yard had two ash pits, a water stand-pipe and an engine shed. Two timber station buildings, separated by a waiting shelter, provided passenger and staff accommodation. A van-goods shed was located at the down end of the platform.

In 1934, bushfires destroyed the station buildings and engine shed. A 12' x 20' "portable" station building was provided to replace the earlier ones, but it only housed bunks for the train crew staying overnight.

The pig race and goods platform were removed in 1940, whilst No. 2 Road was removed in 1941.

Today a short section of track, buffer stop, station nameboard and an NQR wagon mark the station site.

== Services ==
The station's purpose and namesake was a local landowner who utilised the railway to ship timber and potatoes. The station rarely saw a regular passenger service, especially in its decline, due to low utilisation and isolation. Mixed trains often served the few passengers that ventured to Crowes, but they were inconvenient as goods trucks had to be shunted at each station, drastically increasing travel time.

The 1920s in particular were a boom period for the production of timber in the area.

== Proposed future extensions ==
There were proposals for the line to be further extended as far as Princetown on the Great Ocean Road, with surveys being carried out as far as Wangerrip, or "Colac Tree Station".
