= Whitfield railway station =

Former railway station in Australia

Whitfield
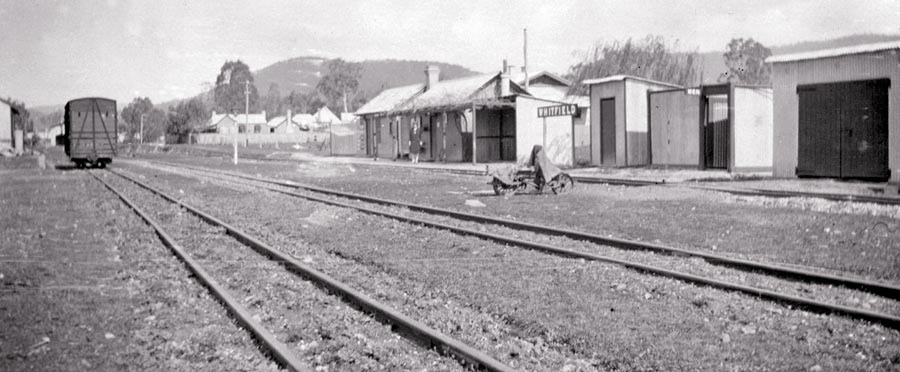

General information
- Coordinates: 36°45′47″S 146°24′48″E
- Line: Whitfield
- Platforms: 1
- Tracks: 3

Other information
- Status: Closed

History
- Opened: 1899
- Closed: 1953

Services
Preceding station	Disused railways	Following station
Pieper	Whitfield railway line	Terminus
	List of closed railway stations in Victoria	
Location

Whitfield Railway station was the terminus railway station for the Whitfield railway line. It was opened in 1899 and closed in 1953. It was the most distant narrow gauge railway station from Melbourne in Victoria.

== Infrastructure ==
The station had a moderately long passenger platform, small goods yard, goods shed, ticket office and locomotive shed.
