= Crowes railway line =

Former railway line in Victoria, Australia

Coordinates: 38°41′23″S 143°22′3″E

Crowes railway
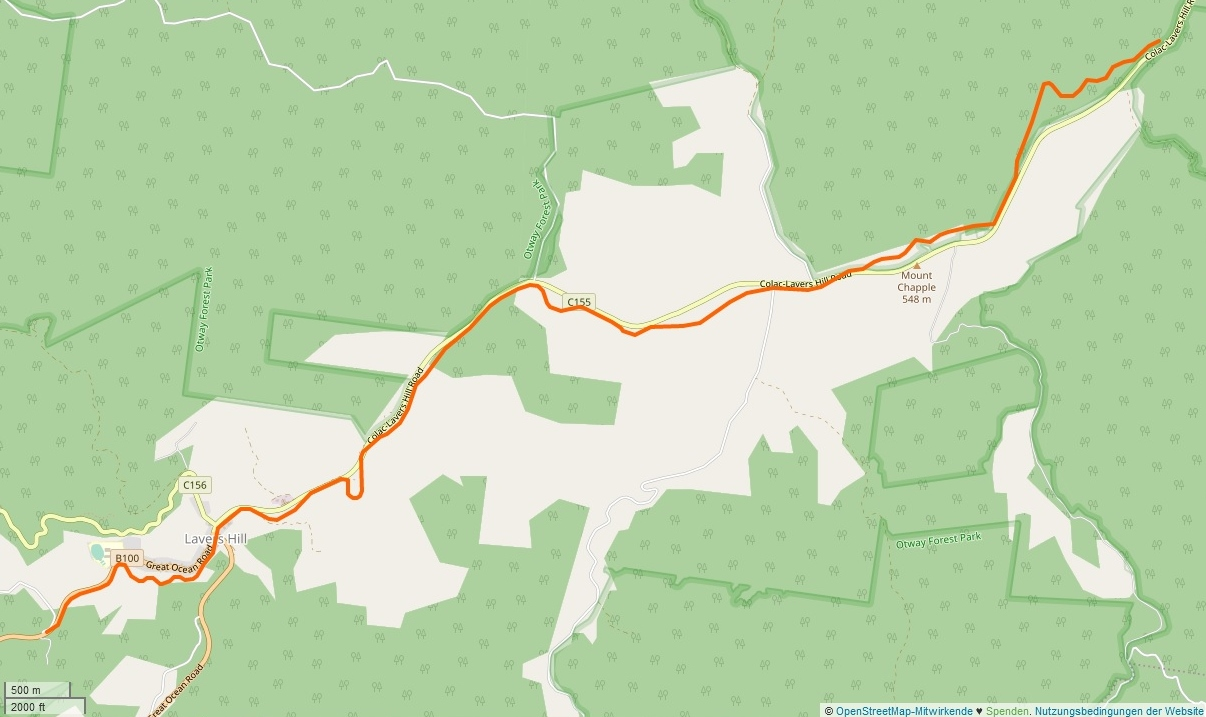

Overview
- Status: Abandoned
- Stations: 23

Service
- Type: Vic

History
- Opened: 1 March 1902 (to Beech Forest); 20 June 1911 (to Crowes)
- Closed: 11 December 1954 (Ferguson to Crowes) (Ferguson-Weeaproinah reopened January 1955); 30 June 1962 (Colac to Weeaproinah)

Technical
- Line length: 44 mi (71 km)
- Number of tracks: Single track
- Track gauge: 2 ft 6 in (762 mm)

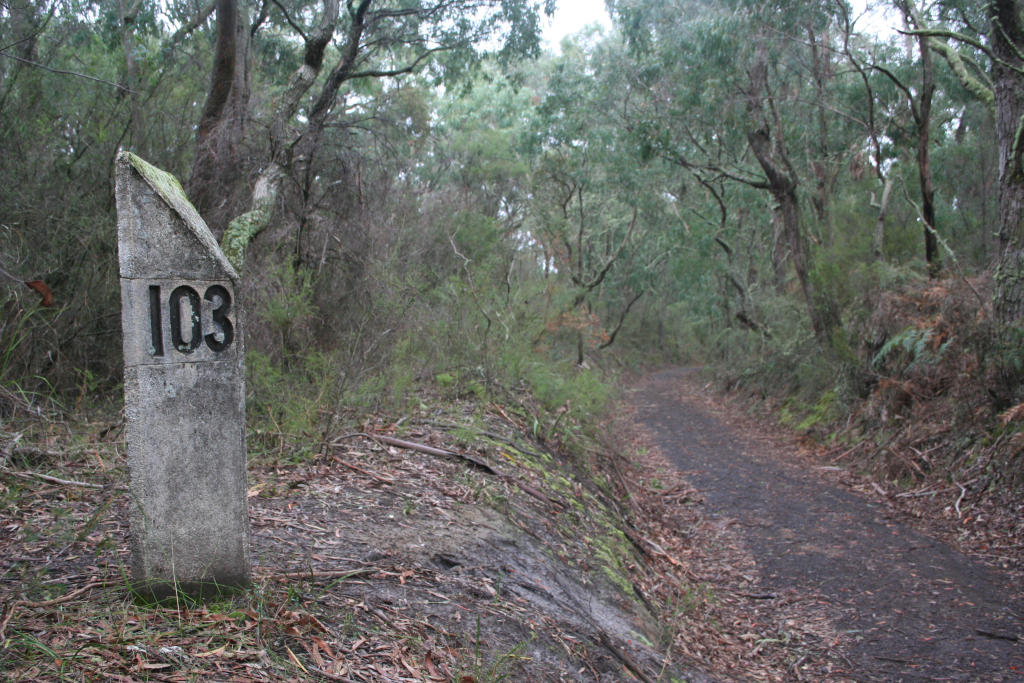
Cutting and 103 mile (166 km) post on the line

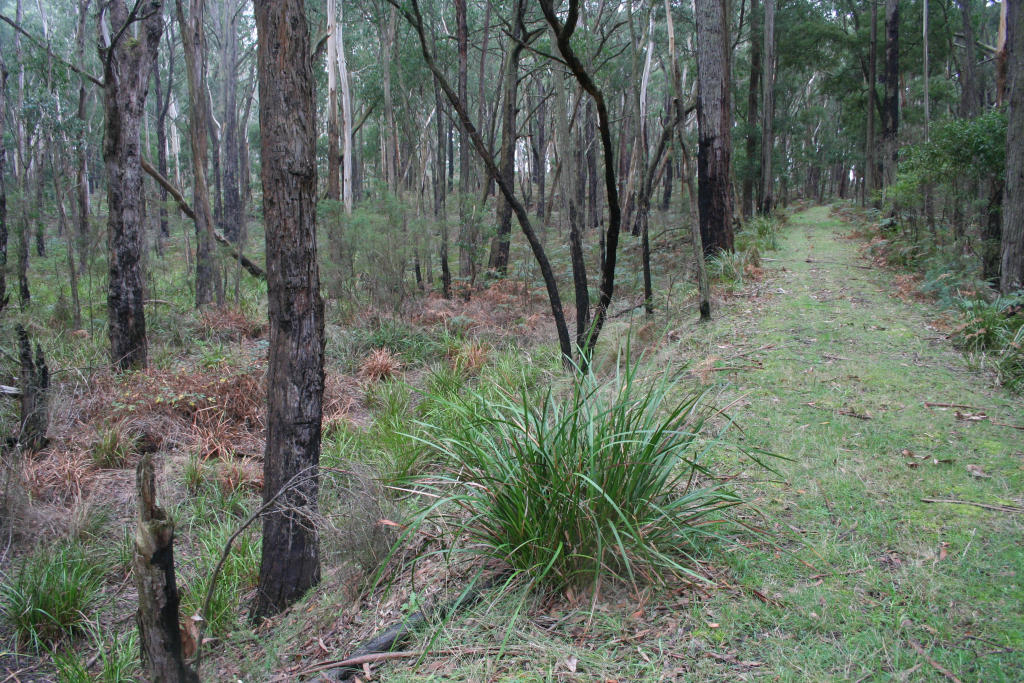
Remnants of an embankment near Barongarook

The Crowes railway line was a 2 ft 6 in (762 mm) narrow gauge railway located in the Otway Ranges in south-western Victoria, Australia, running from the main line to Port Fairy at Colac to Beech Forest and later to Crowes.

It was the third of four narrow gauge lines of the Victorian Railways, opening to Beech Forest in March 1902, and extended to Crowes in June 1911. Nearly 44 miles (71 km) long, it was the longest of the narrow gauge lines. It was also the last to close, finally succumbing in June 1962, although the line had been truncated back to Ferguson railway station in December 1954, only to be reopened to Weeaproinah in January 1955.

Sections of the route have been developed as the Old Beechy Rail Trail.

== Operation ==
Both the Colac and Crowes lines entered Beech Forest yard from the same end, creating a junction. Trains had to be turned to run down the Crowes branch and a balloon loop was provided at the other end of the yard. A tennis court occupied the land within the loop. Crowes, the terminus of the line, was the most southerly railway station on the Australian mainland.

The primary traffic was sawn timber and firewood, with many sawmills located adjacent to the railway, or accessed by short tramways. Seasonally heavy potato traffic and a lime kiln added to revenue. Traffic grew to require up to seven trains a day each way by the mid-1920s. The introduction of the G class Garratt locomotive allowed a new timetable with two trains each way between Colac and Beech Forest, and a third train each way to Gellibrand. The Crowes branch saw a single mixed train daily. The onset of the Great Depression, and competition from motor vehicles, saw traffic decline to a point where only one train each way operated over the line three days a week. Increased wartime loadings saw traffic increase to two trains each way daily, but that was only temporary. By the time the railway closed, the timetable listed only one train each way a week, and most of the traffic was pulpwood.

The line opened using the staff and ticket method of safeworking. Train section orders were adopted between 1927 and 1939, after which staff and ticket working was resumed.

== Planned extensions ==
There were proposals for the line to be further extended as far as Princetown on the Great Ocean Road, with surveys being carried out as far as Wangerrip, or "Colac Tree Station".
